= 2014 Men's U20 Volleyball European Championship =

24th edition of the Men's Junior European Volleyball Championship

2014 CEV U20 Volleyball European Championship
Tournament details
- Host country: Slovakia/Czech Republic
- Dates: August 29 to September 06
- Teams: 12
- Venues: 2 (in 2 host cities)

Final positions
- Champions: Russia (18th title)

Tournament awards
- MVP: Pavel Pankov (RUS)

The 2014 CEV U20 Volleyball European Championship was the 24th edition of the Men's Junior European Volleyball Championship, organised by Europe's governing volleyball body, the CEV. It was held in Nitra and Brno from 29 August to 6 September 2014.

Russia won their 18th title in the tournament by defeating Poland. Pavel Pankov was elected the Most Valuable Player.

== Participating teams ==
- Host
  - Czech Republic
  - Slovakia
- Qualified through 2014 Men's U20 Volleyball European Championship Qualification
  - Russia
  - Poland
  - Romania
  - Slovenia
  - France
  - Bulgaria
  - Turkey
  - Serbia
  - Belgium
  - Italy

== Venues ==
Pool I	Pool II and Final round
Nitra, Slovakia	Brno, Czech Republic
City Hall	Sportovní hala Vodova
Capacity:	Capacity: 3,000

== Preliminary round ==
- All times are Central European Summer Time (UTC+02:00)

Qualified for the semifinals
Qualified for the 5th–8th semifinals

=== Pool I ===
Pos	Team	Pld	W	L	Pts	SW	SL	SR	SPW	SPL	SPR	Qualification
1	Russia	5	4	1	13	14	3	4.667	405	305	1.328	Semifinals
2	France	5	4	1	11	12	5	2.400	364	315	1.156	Semifinals
3	Italy	5	4	1	11	14	7	2.000	469	414	1.133	5th–8th place
4	Serbia	5	2	3	5	6	12	0.500	369	423	0.872	5th–8th place
5	Bulgaria	5	1	4	4	6	12	0.500	370	415	0.892	
6	Slovakia	5	0	5	1	2	15	0.133	297	402	0.739	

Date	Time		Score		Set 1	Set 2	Set 3	Set 4	Set 5	Total	Report
29 Aug	15:00	Russia	3–0	France	25–14	25–13	25–15			75–42	Report
29 Aug	17:30	Slovakia	0–3	Bulgaria	21–25	20–25	17–25			58–75	Report
29 Aug	20:00	Italy	3–0	Serbia	25–22	25–23	25–19			75–64	Report
30 Aug	15:00	Bulgaria	0–3	France	17–25	17–25	15–25			49–75	Report
30 Aug	17:30	Slovakia	0–3	Italy	15–25	16–25	16–25			47–75	Report
30 Aug	20:00	Serbia	0–3	Russia	19–25	23–25	17–25			59–75	Report
31 Aug	15:00	Italy	3–2	Bulgaria	20–25	25–23	21–25	25–15	15–13	106–101	Report
31 Aug	17:30	Russia	3–0	Slovakia	25–11	25–19	25–14			75–44	Report
31 Aug	20:00	France	3–0	Serbia	25–8	25–19	25–16			75–43	Report
2 Sep	15:00	Italy	3–2	Russia	25–22	23–25	22–25	25–20	15–13	110–105	Report
2 Sep	17:30	Slovakia	0–3	France	18–25	16–25	11–25			45–75	Report
2 Sep	20:00	Bulgaria	1–3	Serbia	25–23	21–25	26–28	23–25		95–101	Report
3 Sep	15:00	France	3–2	Italy	12–25	25–22	20–25	25–22	15–9	97–103	Report
3 Sep	17:30	Russia	3–0	Bulgaria	25–14	25–19	25–17			75–50	Report
3 Sep	20:00	Serbia	3–2	Slovakia	25–20	25–20	23–25	14–25	15–13	102–103	Report

=== Pool II ===
Pos	Team	Pld	W	L	Pts	SW	SL	SR	SPW	SPL	SPR	Qualification
1	Poland	5	5	0	14	15	3	5.000	448	348	1.287	Semifinals
2	Slovenia	5	3	2	8	10	9	1.111	417	422	0.988	Semifinals
3	Czech Republic	5	2	3	8	10	9	1.111	428	413	1.036	5th–8th place
4	Turkey	5	2	3	8	12	11	1.091	483	505	0.956	5th–8th place
5	Romania	5	2	3	5	7	12	0.583	410	426	0.962	
6	Belgium	5	1	4	2	4	14	0.286	367	429	0.855	

Date	Time		Score		Set 1	Set 2	Set 3	Set 4	Set 5	Total	Report
29 Aug	15:00	Belgium	3–2	Turkey	25–19	25–27	25–20	22–25	15–13	112–104	Report
29 Aug	17:30	Czech Republic	2–3	Romania	25–14	20–25	13–25	25–23	12–15	95–102	Report
29 Aug	20:00	Slovenia	1–3	Poland	15–25	17–25	25–20	16–25		73–95	Report
30 Aug	15:00	Romania	0–3	Turkey	21–25	21–25	22–25			64–75	Report
30 Aug	17:30	Czech Republic	3–0	Slovenia	25–21	25–20	25–20			75–61	Report
30 Aug	20:00	Poland	3–0	Belgium	25–17	25–18	25–13			75–48	Report
31 Aug	15:00	Slovenia	3–1	Romania	26–24	25–22	23–25	25–15		99–86	Report
31 Aug	17:30	Belgium	0–3	Czech Republic	24–26	21–25	23–25			68–76	Report
31 Aug	20:00	Turkey	2–3	Poland	15–25	28–26	26–24	13–25	9–15	91–115	Report
2 Sep	15:00	Slovenia	3–0	Belgium	25–22	25–16	25–20			75–58	Report
2 Sep	17:30	Czech Republic	2–3	Turkey	19–25	25–18	25–22	23–25	13–15	105–105	Report
2 Sep	20:00	Romania	0–3	Poland	13–25	22–25	24–26			59–76	Report
3 Sep	15:00	Turkey	2–3	Slovenia	22–25	25–21	22–25	25–22	14–16	108–109	Report
3 Sep	17:30	Belgium	1–3	Romania	21–25	26–24	21–25	13–25		81–99	Report
3 Sep	20:00	Poland	3–0	Czech Republic	25–19	29–27	33–31			87–77	Report

== Final round ==
- All times are Central European Summer Time (UTC+02:00)

=== 5th–8th place ===
Semifinals
Italy	3
Turkey	0
Serbia	1
Czech Republic	3

5th place
Italy	3
Czech Republic	0
7th place
Turkey	3
Serbia	2

==== 5th–8th semifinals ====
Date	Time		Score		Set 1	Set 2	Set 3	Set 4	Set 5	Total	Report
5 Sep	12:30	Italy	3–0	Turkey	26–24	25–22	25–20			76–66	Report
5 Sep	17:30	Serbia	1–3	Czech Republic	24–26	25–16	22–25	21–25		92–92	Report

==== 7th place match ====
Date	Time		Score		Set 1	Set 2	Set 3	Set 4	Set 5	Total	Report
6 Sep	10:00	Turkey	3–2	Serbia	25–21	29–27	22–25	23–25	15–11	114–109	Report

==== 5th place match ====
Date	Time		Score		Set 1	Set 2	Set 3	Set 4	Set 5	Total	Report
6 Sep	12:30	Italy	3–0	Czech Republic	25–14	25–14	25–22			75–50	Report

=== Final ===
Semifinals
Russia	3
Slovenia	0
Poland	3
France	1

Final
Russia	3
Poland	0
Third place
Slovenia	0
France	3

==== Semifinals ====
Date	Time		Score		Set 1	Set 2	Set 3	Set 4	Set 5	Total	Report
5 Sep	15:00	Russia	3–0	Slovenia	25–19	27–25	25–14			77–58	Report
5 Sep	20:00	Poland	3–1	France	25–19	21–25	25–19	25–21		96–84	Report

==== 3rd place match ====
Date	Time		Score		Set 1	Set 2	Set 3	Set 4	Set 5	Total	Report
6 Sep	15:00	Slovenia	0–3	France	22–25	21–25	19–25			62–75	Report

==== Final ====
Date	Time		Score		Set 1	Set 2	Set 3	Set 4	Set 5	Total	Report
6 Sep	17:30	Russia	3–0	Poland	25–16	25–16	28–26			78–58	Report

== Final standing ==
Rank	Team
1st place, gold medalist(s)	Russia
2nd place, silver medalist(s)	Poland
3rd place, bronze medalist(s)	France
4	Slovenia
5	Italy
6	Czech Republic
7	Turkey
8	Serbia
9	Romania
10	Bulgaria
11	Belgium
12	Slovakia

2014 Men's CEV U20 European champions

Russia
18th title

12–man Roster
Evgenii Andreev, Azizbek Ismailov, Victor Poletaev, Kirill Ursov, Dmitrii Volkov, Pavel Pankov, Maxim Belogortcev, Ilia Vlasov, Andrey Surmachevskiy, Dmitriy Mostov, Ivan Vlasenko, Ivan Polianskii
Head coach
Sergey Shlyapnikov

== Individual awards ==
- Most valuable player
  - Pavel Pankov (RUS)
- Best scorer
  - Bartosz Bućko (POL)
- Best spiker
  - Toncek Stern (SLO)
- Best blocker
  - Maxim Belogortcev (RUS)
- Best server
  - Nohoarii Paofai (FRA)
- Best setter
  - Pavel Pankov (RUS)
- Best receiver
  - Tomasz Fornal (POL)
- Best libero
  - Kacper Piechocki (POL)
