= 2022 Men's U20 Volleyball European Championship =

28th edition of the Men's Junior European Volleyball Championship

Tournament details
- Host country: Italy
- Cities: Montesilvano; Vasto
- Dates: 17–25 September
- Teams: 12 (from 1 confederation)
- Venue: 2 (in 2 host cities)

Final positions
- Champions: Italy (4th title)
- Runners-up: Poland
- Third place: Bulgaria
- Fourth place: Belgium

Tournament awards
- MVP: (Italy) Alessandro Bovolenta
- Best Setter: (Poland) Kajetan Kubicki
- Best OH: (Italy) Luca Porro (Bulgaria) Aleksandar Nikolov
- Best MB: (Poland) Jakub Majchrzak (Italy) Nicolò Volpe
- Best OPP: (Poland) Tytus Nowik
- Best Libero: (Italy) Gabriele Laurenzano

Tournament statistics
- Matches played: 38
- Attendance: 15,830 (417 per match)

The 2022 Men's U20 Volleyball European Championship is the 28th edition of the Men's Junior European Volleyball Championship, organised by Europe's governing volleyball body, the CEV. The tournament is currently held in Montesilvano and Vasto, Italy from 17 to 25 September 2022. The top two teams of the tournament qualified for the 2023 FIVB Volleyball Men's U21 World Championship as the CEV representatives.

Players must be born on or after 1 January 2003.

== Qualification ==
Besides the host nation team, to become one of the Top 11 teams, the sides had to participate in various cycles of qualifications. First, teams competed in 1st Round Qualifiers. The first placed teams from each then proceeded to 2nd Round, where the first placed teams from each pool booked directly their ticket to the Final Round, while the eight best placed teams (not qualified to the Final Round) from the 2nd Round, qualified to the 3rd Round. In the 3rd Round, in each pool, the first placed team qualified to the Final Round, along with the best second placed team.

- Hosts
  - Italy
- Eleven qualified teams after 3 rounds of qualifiers
  - Belgium
  - Bulgaria
  - Czech Republic
  - Finland
  - France
  - Greece
  - Serbia
  - Slovenia
  - Slovakia
  - Poland
  - Portugal

== Pools composition ==
Pools are divided after the last round of qualifier.

Pool I	Pool II
Italy (Host)	Belgium
Poland	Czech Republic
Serbia	Portugal
Slovakia	Bulgaria
France	Finland
Slovenia	Greece

== Format ==
The two best teams from each pool will play at the semifinals 1–4, while the third and the fourth from each group qualify for semifinals 5–8. The winners from semifinals 1-4 proceed ahead to the Gold Medal Match, and the losers enter the battle for the Bronze.

== Venues ==
Pool I, Semifinals 1–4, Bronze and Gold Medal Match	Pool II, Semifinals 5–8
Montesilvano, Italy	Vasto, Italy
Palazzetto dello Sport Corrado Roma	Pala BCC VASTO
Capacity: 1,500	Capacity: 2,000

== Pool standing procedure ==
1. Number of matches won
2. Match points
3. Sets ratio
4. Points ratio
5. If the tie continues as per the point ratio between two teams, the priority will be given to the team which won the match between them. When the tie in points ratio is between three or more teams, a new classification of these teams in the terms of points 1, 2, 3 and 4 will be made taking into consideration only the matches in which they were opposed to each other.

Match won 3–0 or 3–1: 3 match points for the winner, 0 match points for the loser
Match won 3–2: 2 match points for the winner, 1 match point for the loser

== Preliminary round ==
- All times are Central European Summer Time (UTC+02:00).

=== Pool I ===
Pos	Team	Pld	W	L	Pts	SW	SL	SR	SPW	SPL	SPR	Qualification
1	Italy	5	4	1	13	14	3	4.667	412	331	1.245	Semifinals
2	Poland	5	4	1	11	12	6	2.000	410	363	1.129	Semifinals
3	Slovenia	5	3	2	9	11	8	1.375	417	412	1.012	5th–8th semifinals
4	France	5	2	3	6	8	12	0.667	440	450	0.978	5th–8th semifinals
5	Serbia	5	1	4	4	5	12	0.417	359	407	0.882	
6	Slovakia	5	1	4	2	5	14	0.357	377	462	0.816	

Date	Time	Venue		Score		Set 1	Set 2	Set 3	Set 4	Set 5	Total	Report
17 Sept	15:00	PSC	Serbia	3–0	France	27–25	25–22	25–23			77–70	Report
17 Sept	17:30	PSC	Poland	3–1	Slovakia	25–21	21–25	25–14	25–8		96–68	Report
17 Sept	20:00	PSC	Slovenia	0–3	Italy	25–27	18–25	16–25			59–77	Report
18 Sept	15:00	PSC	Serbia	0–3	Poland	21–25	17–25	17–25			55–75	Report
18 Sept	17:30	PSC	Slovakia	0–3	Slovenia	16–25	19–25	26–28			61–78	Report
18 Sept	20:00	PSC	France	3–2	Italy	21–25	18–25	25–23	25–23	15–13	104–109	Report
19 Sept	15:00	PSC	Slovenia	3–0	Serbia	25–18	25–22	25–11			75–51	Report
19 Sept	17:30	PSC	Poland	3–0	France	25–20	25–21	25–23			75–64	Report
19 Sept	20:00	PSC	Italy	3–0	Slovakia	25–20	25–15	25–17			75–52	Report
21 Sept	15:00	PSC	Poland	3–2	Slovenia	20–25	25–19	23–25	25–19	15–12	108–100	Report
21 Sept	17:30	PSC	France	3–1	Slovakia	25–17	25–15	18–25	29–27		97–84	Report
21 Sept	20:00	PSC	Serbia	0–3	Italy	22–25	19–25	19–25			60–75	Report
22 Sept	15:00	PSC	Slovenia	3–2	France	19–25	25–23	25–20	21–25	15–12	105–105	Report
22 Sept	17:30	PSC	Slovakia	3–2	Serbia	20–25	16–25	36–34	25–21	15–11	112–116	Report
22 Sept	20:00	PSC	Italy	3–0	Poland	25–18	26–24	25–14			76–56	Report

=== Pool II ===
Pos	Team	Pld	W	L	Pts	SW	SL	SR	SPW	SPL	SPR	Qualification
1	Belgium	5	4	1	11	13	6	2.167	457	430	1.063	Semifinals
2	Bulgaria	5	4	1	11	12	7	1.714	436	419	1.041	Semifinals
3	Czech Republic	5	3	2	9	10	8	1.250	424	401	1.057	5th–8th semifinals
4	Finland	5	2	3	6	10	12	0.833	484	475	1.019	5th–8th semifinals
5	Portugal	5	1	4	6	10	12	0.833	482	497	0.970	
6	Greece	5	1	4	2	4	14	0.286	372	433	0.859	

Date	Time	Venue		Score		Set 1	Set 2	Set 3	Set 4	Set 5	Total	Report
17 Sept	15:00	BCC	Portugal	2–3	Greece	23–25	25–19	28–26	22–25	10–15	108–110	Report
17 Sept	17:30	BCC	Czech Republic	3–1	Finland	25–15	19–25	25–19	25–22		94–81	Report
17 Sept	20:00	BCC	Bulgaria	0–3	Belgium	17–25	19–25	22–25			58–75	Report
18 Sept	15:00	BCC	Portugal	3–0	Czech Republic	25–21	27–25	25–20			77–66	Report
18 Sept	17:30	BCC	Finland	2–3	Bulgaria	30–28	17–25	25–20	23–25	9–15	104–113	Report
18 Sept	20:00	BCC	Greece	0–3	Belgium	19–25	23–25	24–26			66–76	Report
19 Sept	15:00	BCC	Bulgaria	3–1	Portugal	25–22	21–25	25–19	25–23		96–89	Report
19 Sept	17:30	BCC	Czech Republic	3–0	Greece	25–22	25–11	25–23			75–56	Report
19 Sept	20:00	BCC	Belgium	3–1	Finland	19–25	25–22	26–24	25–22		95–93	Report
21 Sept	15:00	BCC	Czech Republic	1–3	Bulgaria	25–15	20–25	18–25	23–25		86–90	Report
21 Sept	17:30	BCC	Greece	1–3	Finland	16–25	25–20	16–25	18–25		75–95	Report
21 Sept	20:00	BCC	Portugal	2–3	Belgium	27–25	22–25	25–23	24–26	12–15	110–114	Report
22 Sept	15:00	BCC	Bulgaria	3–0	Greece	25–17	25–21	29–27			79–65	Report
22 Sept	17:30	BCC	Finland	3–2	Portugal	21–25	25–20	25–27	25–14	15–12	111–98	Report
22 Sept	20:00	BCC	Belgium	1–3	Czech Republic	22–25	22–25	29–27	24–26		97–103	Report

== Final round ==
- All times are Central European Summer Time (UTC+02:00).

=== 5th–8th places ===
5th–8th semifinals
24 September – Vasto
Slovenia	3
Finland	1
24 September – Vasto
Czech Republic	2
France	3

5th place match
25 September – Vasto
Slovenia	2
France	3
7th place match
25 September – Vasto
Finland	3
Czech Republic	2

==== 5th–8th semifinals ====
Date	Time	Venue		Score		Set 1	Set 2	Set 3	Set 4	Set 5	Total	Report
24 Sept	17:30	BCC	Slovenia	3–1	Finland	25–21	25–21	23–25	25–17		98–84	Report
24 Sept	20:00	BCC	Czech Republic	2–3	France	23–25	19–25	25–12	25–20	8–15	100–97	Report

==== 7th place match ====
Date	Time	Venue		Score		Set 1	Set 2	Set 3	Set 4	Set 5	Total	Report
25 Sept	09:30	BCC	Finland	3–2	Czech Republic	30–32	25–21	25–23	23–25	15–10	118–111	Report

==== 5th place match ====
Date	Time	Venue		Score		Set 1	Set 2	Set 3	Set 4	Set 5	Total	Report
25 Sept	12:30	BCC	Slovenia	2–3	France	20–25	16–25	25–23	25–21	12–15	98–109	Report

=== Final four ===
Semifinals
24 Sept – Montesilvano
Italy	3
Bulgaria	1
24 Sept – Montesilvano
Belgium	0
Poland	3

Final
25 Sept – Montesilvano
Italy	3
Poland	2
3rd place match
25 Sept – Montesilvano
Bulgaria	3
Belgium	1

==== Semifinals ====
Date	Time	Venue		Score		Set 1	Set 2	Set 3	Set 4	Set 5	Total	Report
24 Sept	17:30	PSC	Italy	3–1	Bulgaria	23–25	25–17	25–18	25–20		98–80	Report
24 Sept	20:00	PSC	Belgium	0–3	Poland	20–25	17–25	15–25			52–75	Report

==== 3rd place match ====
Date	Time	Venue		Score		Set 1	Set 2	Set 3	Set 4	Set 5	Total	Report
25 Sept	17:30	PSC	Bulgaria	3–1	Belgium	25–17	25–19	19–25	25–17		94–78	Report

==== Final ====
Date	Time	Venue		Score		Set 1	Set 2	Set 3	Set 4	Set 5	Total	Report
25 Sept	20:00	PSC	Italy	3–2	Poland	25–19	25–19	24–26	17–25	15–6	106–95	Report

== Final standing ==
Rank	Team
1st place, gold medalist(s)	Italy
2nd place, silver medalist(s)	Poland
3rd place, bronze medalist(s)	Bulgaria
4	Belgium
5	France
6	Slovenia
7	Finland
8	Czech Republic
9	Portugal
10	Serbia
11	Slovakia
12	Greece

Qualified for the 2023 U21 World Championship

== Awards ==
- Most valuable player
  (Italy) Alessandro Bovolenta
- Best setter
  (Poland) Kajetan Kubicki
- Best outside spikers
  (Italy) Luca Porro
  (Bulgaria) Aleksandar Nikolov
- Best middle blockers
  (Poland) Jakub Majchrzak
  (Italy) Nicolò Volpe
- Best opposite spiker
  (Poland) Tytus Nowik
- Best libero
  (Italy) Gabriele Laurenzano

== Broadcasting and ticketing ==
Live streaming of matches are on Official YouTube Channel of Italian Volleyball Federation. EuroVolley TV will broadcast from semifinals on. Also, the organizer launched a platform for ticketing.

== See also ==
- 2022 Women's U19 Volleyball European Championship
