= 2016 Men's U20 Volleyball European Championship =

25th edition of the Men's Junior European Volleyball Championship

Tournament details
- Host country: Bulgaria
- Dates: 2–10 September
- Teams: 12
- Venues: 2 (in 2 host cities)

Final positions
- Champions: Poland (2nd title)

Tournament awards
- MVP: (Ukraine) Oleh Plotnytskyi

The 2016 CEV U20 Volleyball European Championship is the 25th edition of the Men's Junior European Volleyball Championship, organised by CEV. It will be played in Bulgaria from 2 to 10 September 2016.

Poland won the gold medals for a second time in the history of the competition after claiming the title 20 years ago.

== Participating teams ==
- Host Country
  - Bulgaria
- Qualified through 2016 Men's U20 Volleyball European Championship Qualification
  - Belarus
  - Czech Republic
  - France
  - Germany
  - Italy
  - Poland
  - Russia
  - Serbia
  - Slovenia
  - Turkey
  - Ukraine

== Pools composition ==
Pool I	Pool II
Bulgaria	Russia
Slovenia	Turkey
Poland	Serbia
France	Italy
Germany	Czech Republic
Ukraine	Belarus

== Venues ==
Pool I and Final round	Pool II
Plovdiv, Bulgaria	Varna, Bulgaria
Kolodruma	Palace of Culture and Sports
Capacity: 6,100	Capacity: 5,500

== Preliminary round ==
- All times are Eastern European Summer Time (UTC+03:00)

=== Pool I ===
Pos	Team	Pld	W	L	Pts	SW	SL	SR	SPW	SPL	SPR	Qualification
1	Poland	5	5	0	14	15	3	5.000	430	353	1.218	Semifinals
2	Ukraine	5	4	1	11	12	5	2.400	401	351	1.142	Semifinals
3	Bulgaria	5	3	2	9	11	8	1.375	431	405	1.064	5th–8th semifinals
4	Germany	5	2	3	5	6	12	0.500	385	419	0.919	5th–8th semifinals
5	France	5	1	4	6	9	12	0.750	446	472	0.945	
6	Slovenia	5	0	5	0	2	15	0.133	330	423	0.780	

Date	Time		Score		Set 1	Set 2	Set 3	Set 4	Set 5	Total	Report
2 Sep	15:00	France	2–3	Poland	25–20	25–22	15–25	22–25	11–15	98–107	Report
2 Sep	17:30	Bulgaria	2–3	Ukraine	28–26	25–22	23–25	26–28	9–15	111–116	Report
2 Sep	20:00	Germany	3–1	Slovenia	25–27	25–18	25–19	25–21		100–85	Report
3 Sep	15:00	Poland	3–0	Ukraine	25–21	25–20	25–18			75–59	Report
3 Sep	17:30	Slovenia	0–3	Bulgaria	18–25	15–25	18–25			51–75	Report
3 Sep	20:00	France	2–3	Germany	23–25	33–31	25–19	14–25	14–16	109–116	Report
4 Sep	15:00	Ukraine	3–0	Slovenia	25–18	25–11	25–19			75–48	Report
4 Sep	17:30	Bulgaria	3–2	France	25–23	22–25	25–23	19–25	15–10	106–106	Report
4 Sep	20:00	Germany	0–3	Poland	16–25	20–25	17–25			53–75	Report
6 Sep	15:00	France	0–3	Ukraine	15–25	19–25	24–26			58–76	Report
6 Sep	17:30	Germany	0–3	Bulgaria	23–25	17–25	17–25			57–75	Report
6 Sep	20:00	Poland	3–1	Slovenia	25–16	23–25	25–19	25–19		98–79	Report
7 Sep	15:00	Ukraine	3–0	Germany	25–18	25–22	25–19			75–59	Report
7 Sep	17:30	Bulgaria	0–3	Poland	22–25	22–25	20–25			64–75	Report
7 Sep	20:00	Slovenia	0–3	France	23–25	22–25	22–25			67–75	Report

=== Pool II ===
Pos	Team	Pld	W	L	Pts	SW	SL	SR	SPW	SPL	SPR	Qualification
1	Italy	5	5	0	13	15	5	3.000	454	408	1.113	Semifinals
2	Russia	5	4	1	12	14	6	2.333	462	396	1.167	Semifinals
3	Serbia	5	3	2	6	9	12	0.750	431	454	0.949	5th–8th semifinals
4	Turkey	5	2	3	8	11	9	1.222	431	408	1.056	5th–8th semifinals
5	Czech Republic	5	1	4	5	8	12	0.667	412	454	0.907	
6	Belarus	5	0	5	1	2	15	0.133	333	403	0.826	

Date	Time		Score		Set 1	Set 2	Set 3	Set 4	Set 5	Total	Report
2 Sep	15:00	Turkey	2–3	Serbia	25–21	15–25	18–25	25–13	13–15	96–99	Report
2 Sep	17:30	Belarus	0–3	Russia	13–25	19–25	16–25			48–75	Report
2 Sep	20:00	Czech Republic	1–3	Italy	22–25	25–20	21–25	20–25		88–95	Report
3 Sep	15:00	Turkey	3–0	Belarus	25–22	25–13	25–20			75–55	Report
3 Sep	17:30	Serbia	0–3	Italy	15–25	24–26	20–25			59–76	Report
3 Sep	20:00	Russia	3–2	Czech Republic	25–16	22–25	26–28	25–17	15–11	113–97	Report
4 Sep	15:00	Belarus	2–3	Serbia	23–25	25–17	21–25	25–21	11–15	105–103	Report
4 Sep	17:30	Czech Republic	0–3	Turkey	19–25	13–25	18–25			50–75	Report
4 Sep	20:00	Italy	3–2	Russia	22–25	16–25	26–24	25–12	15–13	104–99	Report
6 Sep	15:00	Belarus	0–3	Czech Republic	23–25	22–25	18–25			63–75	Report
6 Sep	17:30	Turkey	2–3	Italy	25–19	21–25	25–20	21–25	8–15	100–104	Report
6 Sep	20:00	Serbia	0–3	Russia	19–25	23–25	20–25			62–75	Report
7 Sep	15:00	Italy	3–0	Belarus	25–18	25–23	25–21			75–62	Report
7 Sep	17:30	Czech Republic	2–3	Serbia	25–20	20–25	20–25	25–23	12–15	102–108	Report
7 Sep	20:00	Russia	3–1	Turkey	25–27	25–19	25–18	25–21		100–85	Report

== Final round ==
- All times are Eastern European Summer Time (UTC+03:00)

=== 5th–8th place ===
Semifinals
9 September
Bulgaria	2
Turkey	3
9 September
Germany	3
Serbia	2

5th place
10 September
Turkey	3
Germany	1
7th place
10 September
Bulgaria	1
Serbia	3

==== 5th–8th semifinals ====
Date	Time		Score		Set 1	Set 2	Set 3	Set 4	Set 5	Total	Report
9 Sep	12:00	Germany	3–2	Serbia	26–28	25–21	18–25	25–17	15–7	109–98	Report
9 Sep	14:30	Bulgaria	2–3	Turkey	25–19	24–26	25–19	14–25	11–15	99–104	Report

==== 7th place match ====
Date	Time		Score		Set 1	Set 2	Set 3	Set 4	Set 5	Total	Report
10 Sep	10:00	Bulgaria	1–3	Serbia	25–20	23–25	23–25	21–25		92–95	Report

==== 5th place match ====
Date	Time		Score		Set 1	Set 2	Set 3	Set 4	Set 5	Total	Report
10 Sep	12:30	Turkey	3–1	Germany	18–25	25–15	25–15	25–23		93–78	Report

=== Final ===
Semifinals
9 September
Poland	3
Russia	1
9 September
Italy	2
Ukraine	3

Final
10 September
Poland	3
Ukraine	1
Third place
10 September
Russia	3
Italy	1

==== Semifinals ====
Date	Time		Score		Set 1	Set 2	Set 3	Set 4	Set 5	Total	Report
9 Sep	17:00	Poland	3–1	Russia	25–23	25–20	19–25	25–22		94–90	Report
9 Sep	19:30	Italy	2–3	Ukraine	12–25	26–24	25–15	24–26	13–15	100–105	Report

==== 3rd place match ====
Date	Time		Score		Set 1	Set 2	Set 3	Set 4	Set 5	Total	Report
10 Sep	15:30	Russia	3–1	Italy	23–25	25–21	25–17	25–18		98–81	Report

==== Final ====
Date	Time		Score		Set 1	Set 2	Set 3	Set 4	Set 5	Total	Report
10 Sep	18:00	Poland	3–1	Ukraine	29–27	25–21	21–25	25–12		100–85	Report

== Final standing ==
Rank	Team
1st place, gold medalist(s)	Poland
2nd place, silver medalist(s)	Ukraine
3rd place, bronze medalist(s)	Russia
4	Italy
5	Turkey
6	Germany
7	Serbia
8	Bulgaria
9	France
10	Czech Republic
11	Belarus
12	Slovenia

2016 Men's U20 European champions

Poland
2nd title

12–man roster
Bartosz Kwolek, Jakub Kochanowski, Łukasz Kozub, Szymon Jakubiszak, Jakub Ziobrowski, Damian Domagała, Dawid Woch, Mateusz Masłowski, Norbert Huber, Łukasz Rajchelt, Tomasz Fornal, Sławomir Busch
Head coach
Sebastian Pawlik

== Individual awards ==
- Most valuable player
  (Ukraine) Oleh Plotnytskyi
- Best setter
  (Italy) Riccardo Sbertoli
- Best outside spikers
  (Ukraine) Oleh Plotnytskyi
  (Poland) Bartosz Kwolek
- Best middle blockers
  (Russia) Aleksei Kononov
  (Italy) Gianluca Galassi
- Best opposite spiker
  (Poland) Jakub Ziobrowski
- Best libero
  (Bulgaria) Stanislav Dramov

== See also ==
- 2016 Women's U19 Volleyball European Championship
