= Turkey men's national under-21 volleyball team =

Turkey U21
- Association: Turkish Volleyball Federation
- Confederation: CEV

Uniforms
Home	Away	Third

FIVB U21 World Championship
- Appearances: 3 (First in 2013)
- Best result: 6th Place : (2013, 2015)

Europe U21 / U20 Championship
- Appearances: 14 (First in 1966)
- Best result: 4th Place : (1994, 2012)

The Turkey men's national under-21 volleyball team represents Turkey in international men's volleyball competitions and friendly matches under the age 21. The team is governed by the Turkish Volleyball Federation, a body that is an affiliate of the Federation of International Volleyball FIVB and also part of the European Volleyball Confederation CEV.

== Results ==
=== FIVB U21 World Championship ===
Champions Runners up Third place Fourth place

FIVB U21 World Championship
Year	Round	Position	Pld	W	L	SW	SL	Squad
(Brazil) 1977	Didn't qualify							
(United States) 1981	Didn't qualify							
(Italy) 1985	Didn't qualify							
(Bahrain) 1987	Didn't qualify							
(Greece) 1989	Didn't qualify							
(Egypt) 1991	Didn't qualify							
(Argentina) 1993	Didn't qualify							
(Malaysia) 1995	Didn't qualify							
(Bahrain) 1997	Didn't qualify							
(Thailand) 1999	Didn't qualify							
(Poland) 2001	Didn't qualify							
(Iran) 2003	Didn't qualify							
(India) 2005	Didn't qualify							
(Morocco) 2007	Didn't qualify							
(India) 2009	Didn't qualify							
(Brazil) 2011	Didn't qualify							
(Turkey) 2013		6th place	8	6	2			Squad
(Mexico) 2015		6th place	8	5	3			Squad
(Czech Republic) 2017		10th place	8	4	4			Squad
(Bahrain) 2019	Didn't Qualify							
(Italy) (Bulgaria) 2021	Didn't Qualify							
(Bahrain) 2023	Didn't Qualify							
(China) 2025		16th place	9	2	7			Squad
Total	0 Titles	4/23	33	17	16			

=== Europe U21 / 20 Championship ===
Champions Runners up Third place Fourth place

Europe U21 / 20 Championship
Year	Round	Position	Pld	W	L	SW	SL	Squad
(Hungary) 1966		12th place						Squad
(Soviet Union) 1969		16th place						Squad
(Spain) 1971	Didn't qualify							
(Netherlands) 1973		14th place						Squad
(West Germany) 1975	Didn't qualify							
(France) 1977		10th place						Squad
(Portugal) 1979	Didn't qualify							
(West Germany) 1982	Didn't qualify							
(France) 1984		11th place						Squad
(Hungary) 1986	Didn't qualify							
(Italy) 1988	Didn't qualify							
(West Germany) 1990		11th place						Squad
(Poland) 1992		10th place						Squad
(Turkey) 1994		4th place						Squad
(Israel) 1996	Didn't qualify							
(Czech Republic) 1998	Didn't qualify							
(Italy) 2000	Didn't qualify							
(Poland) 2002	Didn't qualify							
(Croatia) 2004	Didn't qualify							
(Russia) 2006	Didn't qualify							
(Czech Republic) 2008		11th place						Squad
(Belarus) 2010		12th place						Squad
(Denmark) / (Poland) 2012		4th place						Squad
(Czech Republic) / (Slovakia) 2014		7th place						Squad
(Bulgaria) 2016		5th place						Squad
(Netherlands) / (Belgium) 2018		12th place						Squad
(Czech Republic) 2020	Withdraw							
(Italy) 2022	Didn't qualify							
(Greece) / (Serbia) 2024		6th place						Squad
Total	0 Titles	15/29						

== Team ==
=== Current squad ===
The following is the Turkish roster in the 2017 FIVB Volleyball Men's U21 World Championship.

Head coach: Ali Kazım Hidayetoğlu

No.	Name	Date of birth	Height	Weight	Spike	Block	2017 club
2	Batuhan Avci	2 August 2000	1.96 m (6 ft 5 in)	72 kg (159 lb)	328 cm (129 in)	318 cm (125 in)	(Turkey) Beşiktaş Istanbul
3	Mustafa Cengiz	29 May 1998	2.01 m (6 ft 7 in)	85 kg (187 lb)	335 cm (132 in)	325 cm (128 in)	(Turkey) Arkas İzmir
4	Muzaffer Yonet	18 June 1997	1.90 m (6 ft 3 in)	70 kg (150 lb)	318 cm (125 in)	300 cm (120 in)	(Turkey) Arkas İzmir
5	Ogulcan Yatgin	28 April 1997	1.97 m (6 ft 6 in)	87 kg (192 lb)	320 cm (130 in)	309 cm (122 in)	(Turkey) Fenerbahçe Istanbul
6	Abdullah Cam (C)	30 March 1997	1.95 m (6 ft 5 in)	80 kg (180 lb)	316 cm (124 in)	300 cm (120 in)	(Turkey) Halkbank Ankara
9	Halil Ibrahim Kurt	16 February 1998	2.03 m (6 ft 8 in)	90 kg (200 lb)	323 cm (127 in)	311 cm (122 in)	(Turkey) Fenerbahçe Istanbul
10	Özgür Türkmen	22 January 1998	1.90 m (6 ft 3 in)	75 kg (165 lb)	325 cm (128 in)	312 cm (123 in)	(Turkey) Galatasaray Istanbul
12	Yunus Emre Tayaz	20 March 1998	2.01 m (6 ft 7 in)	95 kg (209 lb)	335 cm (132 in)	325 cm (128 in)	(Turkey) Bornova Anadolu Lisesi
13	Anil Durgut	25 June 1997	2.00 m (6 ft 7 in)	90 kg (200 lb)	328 cm (129 in)	313 cm (123 in)	(Turkey) Fenerbahçe Istanbul
15	Adis Lagumdzija	19 March 1999	2.04 m (6 ft 8 in)	96 kg (212 lb)	330 cm (130 in)	310 cm (120 in)	(Turkey) Galatasaray Istanbul
19	Oguzhan Dogruluk	1 January 1998	1.98 m (6 ft 6 in)	90 kg (200 lb)	325 cm (128 in)	310 cm (120 in)	(Turkey) Ziraat Bankası Ankara
20	Hüseyin Şahin	1 September 1998	1.86 m (6 ft 1 in)	80 kg (180 lb)	320 cm (130 in)	305 cm (120 in)	(Turkey) Arkas İzmir

== See also ==
  - Men's
- Turkey Men's national volleyball team
- Turkey Men's national volleyball team U23
- Turkey Men's national volleyball team U21
- Turkey Men's national volleyball team U19
  - Women's
- Turkey Women's national volleyball team
- Turkey Women's national volleyball team U23
- Turkey Women's national volleyball team U20
- Turkey Women's national volleyball team U18
