= Aleksandar Nikolov (volleyball) =

Bulgarian volleyball player (born 2003)

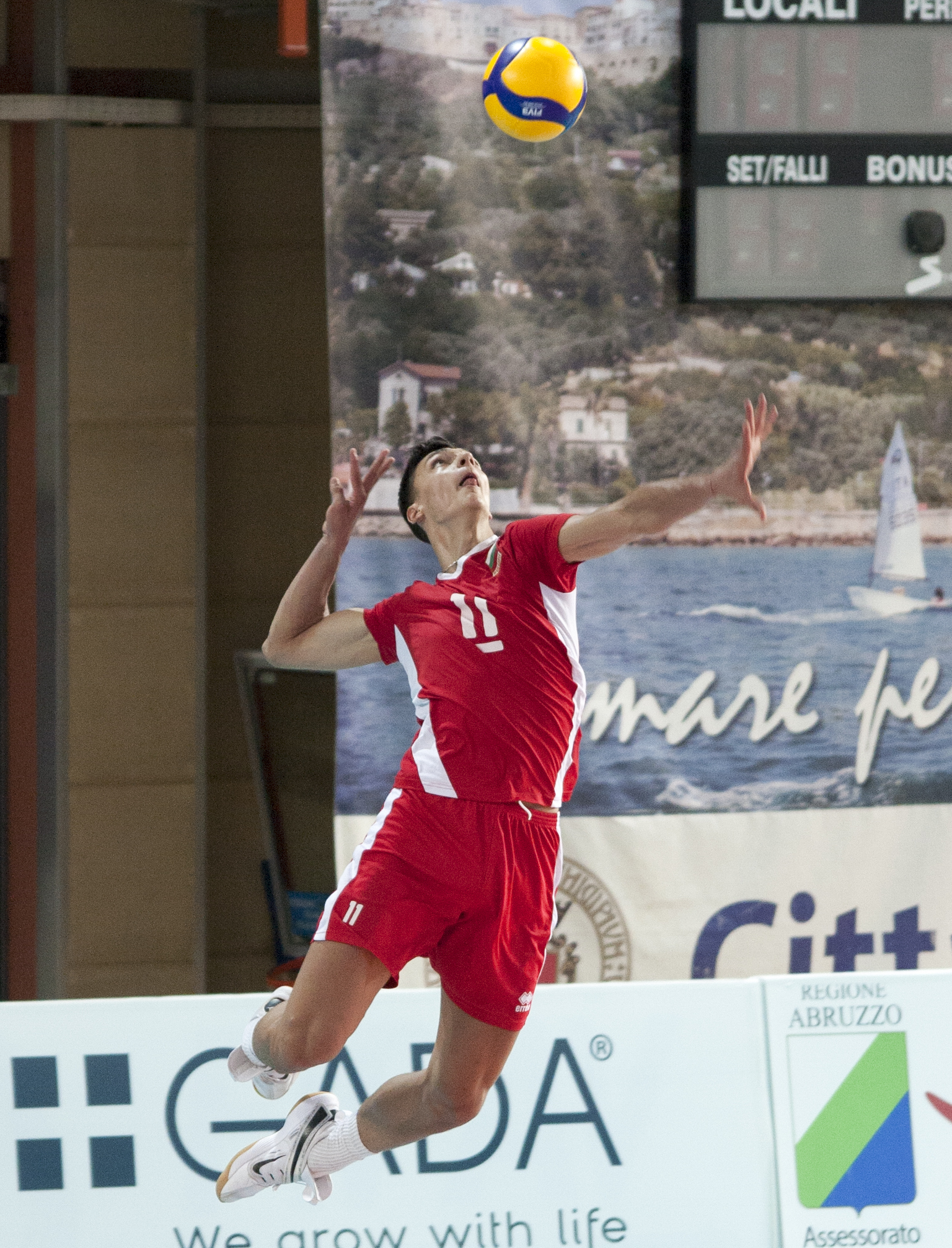
- Nikolov during the 2022 U20 European Championship

Personal information
- Full name: Aleksandar Vladimirov Nikolov
- Nickname: Aleks
- Nationality: Bulgarian
- Born: 30 November 2003 (age 22); Tours, France
- Height: 2.07 m (6 ft 9 in)
- Weight: 100 kg (220 lb)
- Spike: 352 cm (11 ft 7 in)
- Block: 333 cm (10 ft 11 in)
- Education: Long Beach State University

Volleyball information
- Position: Outside hitter
- Current club: Cucine Lube Civitanova
- Number: 11

Career
Years	Teams
2019–2021; 2021–2022; 2022–	Levski Sofia; Long Beach State; Cucine Lube Civitanova

National team
2020–2021; 2021–2023; 2021–	Bulgaria U19; Bulgaria U21; Bulgaria
Honours
Men's volleyball
Representing Bulgaria
FIVB World Championship
Silver medal – second place	2025 Philippines

Aleksandar Vladimirov Nikolov (Bulgarian: Александър Владимиров Николов; born 30 November 2003) is a Bulgarian professional volleyball player who plays as an outside hitter for Lega Pallavolo Serie A club Cucine Lube Civitanova and the Bulgaria national team.

== Career ==
=== Club ===
Nikolov started his club career at Levski Sofia in Bulgaria. He joined Long Beach State in 2021, leading the team to the 2022 NCAA national championship final where they lost to Hawaii. In his freshman year, Nikolov was named the National Player of the Year.

Following a successful first season at Long Beach, Nikolov signed for professional club Cucine Lube Civitanova in Italy.

=== National team ===
Nikolov has played for Bulgaria's various youth teams, leading his respective teams to several medal finishes at youth and junior world and European championships.

In 2021, Nikolov made his official debut with the senior men's national team.

== Personal life ==
Nikolov is the son of Vladimir and Maya Nikolov. Both parents played professional volleyball, with Vladimir playing nearly two decades with the Bulgarian national team. He was born in Tours, France, while his father was playing for the French club Tours VB.

Nikolov has three siblings, including fellow Bulgarian national team player Simeon Nikolov.

As of 2026, Nikolov is in a relationship with Serbian volleyball player Hena Kurtagić.

== Honours ==
=== College ===
- 2022 NCAA National Championship, with Long Beach State

=== Club ===
Continental

- 2023–24 CEV Champions League, with Cucine Lube Civitanova
- 2024–25 CEV Challenge Cup, with Cucine Lube Civitanova

Domestic

- 2022–23 Italian SuperLega, with Cucine Lube Civitanova
- 2024–25 Italian SuperLega, with Cucine Lube Civitanova
- 2024–25 Italian Cup, with Cucine Lube Civitanova

=== International ===
- 2019 CEV U16 European Championship
- 2021 FIVB U19 World Championship
- 2022 CEV U18 European Championship
- 2022 CEV U20 European Championship
- 2023 FIVB U21 World Championship
- 2025 FIVB World Championship

=== Individual awards ===
- 2021 FIVB U19 World Championship – Best outside spiker
- 2022 NCAA National Championship – All-tournament team
- 2022 CEV U20 European Championship – Best outside spiker
- 2023 FIVB U21 World Championship - Best scorer
- 2023 FIVB U21 World Championship - Best server
- 2025 FIVB World Championship - Best outside spiker and best scorer
- 2025 Volleyball World - #2 Best World Men Volleyball Player of the Year 2025
- 2026 FIVB Men's Volleyball Nations League - Best scorer
- 2026 FIVB Men's Volleyball Nations League - Best attacker
