= Russia men's national under-21 volleyball team =

Youth volleyball team representing Russia

Russia U21
- Association: Volleyball Federation Of Russia

Uniforms
Home	Away	Third

FIVB U21 World Championship
- Appearances: 15 (First in 1993)
- Best result: (gold) Champions (1995, 1999, 2005, 2011, 2013, 2015)
- www.volley.ru (in Russian)

The Russia men's national under-21 volleyball team represents Russia in international men's volleyball competitions and friendly matches under the age 21. It is ruled by the Russian Volleyball Federation, an affiliate of the International Volleyball Federation (FIVB) and of the European Volleyball Confederation (CEV).

In response to the 2022 Russian invasion of Ukraine, the International Volleyball Federation suspended all Russian national teams, clubs, and officials, as well as beach and snow volleyball athletes, from all events. The European Volleyball Confederation (CEV) also banned all Russian national teams, clubs, and officials from participating in European competition, and suspended all members of Russia from their respective functions in CEV organs.

== Results ==
=== FIVB U21 World Championship ===
Champions Runners-up 3rd place 4th place

FIVB U21 World Championship
Year	Round	Position	Pld	W	L	SW	SL	Squad
(Brazil) 1977	See Soviet Union							
(United States) 1981	See Soviet Union							
(Italy) 1985	See Soviet Union							
(Bahrain) 1987	See Soviet Union							
(Greece) 1989	See Soviet Union							
(Egypt) 1991	See Soviet Union							
(Argentina) 1993		5th place						Squad
(Malaysia) 1995		Champions						Squad
(Bahrain) 1997		3rd place						Squad
(Thailand) 1999		Champions						Squad
(Poland) 2001		Runners-up						Squad
(Iran) 2003		5th place						Squad
(India) 2005		Champions						Squad
(Morocco) 2007		Runners-up						Squad
(India) 2009		5th place						Squad
(Brazil) 2011		Champions						Squad
(Turkey) 2013		Champions						Squad
(Mexico) 2015		Champions						Squad
(Czech Republic) 2017		3rd place						Squad
(Bahrain) 2019		4th place						Squad
(Italy) (Bulgaria) 2021		Runners-up						Squad
Total	6 Titles	15/21						

=== Europe U21 / 20 Championship ===
Champions Runners-up 3rd place 4th place

Europe U21 / 20 Championship
Year	Round	Position	Pld	W	L	SW	SL	Squad
(Hungary) 1966	See Soviet Union							
(Soviet Union) 1969	See Soviet Union							
(Spain) 1971	See Soviet Union							
(Netherlands) 1973	See Soviet Union							
(West Germany) 1975	See Soviet Union							
(France) 1977	See Soviet Union							
(Portugal) 1979	See Soviet Union							
(West Germany) 1982	See Soviet Union							
(France) 1984	See Soviet Union							
(Hungary) 1986	See Soviet Union							
(Italy) 1988	See Soviet Union							
(West Germany) 1990	See Soviet Union							
(Poland) 1992	See Soviet Union							
(Turkey) 1994		Champions						Squad
(Israel) 1996		3rd place						Squad
(Czech Republic) 1998		Champions						Squad

Europe U21 / 20 Championship
Year	Round	Position	Pld	W	L	SW	SL	Squad
(Italy) 2000		Champions						Squad
(Poland) 2002		4th place						Squad
(Croatia) 2004		Champions						Squad
(Russia) 2006		Champions						Squad
(Czech Republic) 2008		3rd place						Squad
(Belarus) 2010		Champions						Squad
(Denmark) / (Poland) 2012		5th place						Squad
(Czech Republic) / (Slovakia) 2014		Champions						Squad
(Bulgaria) 2016		3rd place						Squad
(Netherlands) / (Belgium) 2018		Champions						Squad
(Czech Republic) 2020		Champions						Squad
(Italy) 2022	Disqualified							Squad
Total	9 Titles	14/28						

== Team ==
=== Current squad ===
The following is the Russian roster in the 2019 FIVB Volleyball Men's U21 World Championship.

Head coach: Andrey Nozdrin

No.	Name	Date of birth	Height	Weight	Spike	Block	2019 club
1	Ivan Kuznetcov	13 November 1999	2.01 m (6 ft 7 in)	88 kg (194 lb)	340 cm (130 in)	330 cm (130 in)	(Russia) Belogorie
2	Vitalii Dikarev	13 November 1999	2.08 m (6 ft 10 in)	95 kg (209 lb)	340 cm (130 in)	330 cm (130 in)	(Russia) Fakel NOVY URENGOY
3	Alexander Zakhvatenkov	26 December 1999	2.05 m (6 ft 9 in)	90 kg (200 lb)	340 cm (130 in)	330 cm (130 in)	(Russia) Belogorie
4	Artem Melnikov	28 June 1999	2.04 m (6 ft 8 in)	92 kg (203 lb)	340 cm (130 in)	330 cm (130 in)	(Russia) DINAMO-LO
5	Konstantin Abaev C	17 June 1999	1.92 m (6 ft 4 in)	82 kg (181 lb)	320 cm (130 in)	310 cm (120 in)	(Russia) LOKOMOTIV
7	Egor Sidenko	7 September 1999	1.98 m (6 ft 6 in)	86 kg (190 lb)	350 cm (140 in)	340 cm (130 in)	(Russia) Belogorie BELGOROD
8	Pavel Tetyukhin	22 October 2000	1.88 m (6 ft 2 in)	75 kg (165 lb)	310 cm (120 in)	300 cm (120 in)	(Russia) Belogorie
12	Maksim Sapozhkov	15 November 2000	2.1 m (6 ft 11 in)	97 kg (214 lb)	340 cm (130 in)	330 cm (130 in)	(Russia) Lokomotiv
14	Egor Krechetov	17 August 1999	1.88 m (6 ft 2 in)	79 kg (174 lb)	310 cm (120 in)	300 cm (120 in)	(Russia) VC Kuzbass
17	Denis Golubev	7 March 2000	1.83 m (6 ft 0 in)	73 kg (161 lb)	310 cm (120 in)	300 cm (120 in)	(Russia) Lokomotiv NOVOSIBIRSK
19	Anatolii Volodin	2 July 1999	1.91 m (6 ft 3 in)	85 kg (187 lb)	338 cm (133 in)	321 cm (126 in)	(Russia) Fakel NOVY URENGOY
20	Viktor Pivovarov	22 August 1999	1.99 m (6 ft 6 in)	87 kg (192 lb)	350 cm (140 in)	340 cm (130 in)	(Russia) Ural
