= 2014 Men's U20 Volleyball European Championship Qualification =

This is an article about qualification for the 2014 Men's U20 Volleyball European Championship.

== Qualification summary ==
- Belgium
- Bulgaria
- Czech Republic
- France
- Italy
- Poland
- Romania
- Russia
- Serbia
- Slovakia
- Slovenia
- Turkey

== Pool standing procedure ==
1. Number of matches won
2. Match points
3. Sets ratio
4. Points ratio
5. Result of the last match between the tied teams

Match won 3–0 or 3–1: 3 match points for the winner, 0 match points for the loser
Match won 3–2: 2 match points for the winner, 1 match point for the loser

== Direct qualification ==
Host countries, Czech Republic and Slovakia qualified for final round directly.

== First round ==
First round was held 3–5 January 2014. With there being 31 teams for this edition, only one 1st Round pool played with the 3 lowest ranked teams (according to the CEV U20 Men European Ranking List), where the 1st and 2nd placed teams qualified to the 2nd Round.

All times are local.

- Venue: National Volleyball Centre, Kettering, England

Pos	Team	Pld	W	L	Pts	SW	SL	SR	SPW	SPL	SPR	Qualification
1	Norway	2	2	0	6	6	0	MAX	153	103	1.485	Second round
2	England	2	1	1	3	3	3	1.000	134	122	1.098	Second round
3	Azerbaijan	2	0	2	0	0	6	0.000	88	150	0.587	

Date	Time		Score		Set 1	Set 2	Set 3	Set 4	Set 5	Total	Report
3 Jan	16:00	Norway	3–0	Azerbaijan	25–15	25–14	25–15			75–44	Report
4 Jan	16:30	Azerbaijan	0–3	England	18–25	9–25	17–25			44–75	Report
5 Jan	15:30	England	0–3	Norway	26–28	13–25	20–25			59–78	Report

== Second round ==
28 teams competed in seven 2nd Round tournaments consisting of 4 teams. These took place between 25 – 27 April 2014.

The 1st placed teams of each pool qualified directly for the Final Round. The 2nd placed teams of each Pool as well as the 3rd placed team with the best score among the 2nd Round Pools qualified for the 3rd Round.

Following Ukraine's withdrawal from the competition, Pool B featured only three teams. As a result, in order to determine the third placed team with the best score among the 2nd Round Pools, the result of all the matches played with the last placed team wouldn't be taken into account in pools with four participants. This means an updated final standing will be calculated accordingly so that the comparison among all third placed teams was done counting the same number of matches.

- Pools composition

Pool A	Pool B	Pool C	Pool D	Pool E	Pool F	Pool G
Russia	Poland	Romania	Slovenia	France	Bulgaria	Turkey
Estonia	Italy	Spain	Serbia	Belgium	Greece	Germany
Israel	Austria	Norway	Finland	Portugal	Netherlands	Croatia
Latvia		Denmark	Hungary	Sweden	England	Montenegro

All times are local.

=== Pool A ===
- Venue: Audentes Sports Hall, Tallinn, Estonia

Pos	Team	Pld	W	L	Pts	SW	SL	SR	SPW	SPL	SPR	Qualification
1	Russia	3	3	0	9	9	0	MAX	228	157	1.452	2014 European Championship
2	Estonia	3	2	1	4	6	7	0.857	276	276	1.000	Third round
3	Israel	3	1	2	4	5	6	0.833	229	240	0.954	
4	Latvia	3	0	3	1	2	9	0.222	202	262	0.771	

Date	Time		Score		Set 1	Set 2	Set 3	Set 4	Set 5	Total	Report
25 Apr	16:30	Latvia	2–3	Estonia	25–23	19–25	25–20	21–25	11–15	101–108	Report
25 Apr	19:00	Russia	3–0	Israel	25–18	25–15	25–20			75–53	Report
26 Apr	16:30	Estonia	3–2	Israel	25–16	25–27	25–22	19–25	15–7	109–97	Report
26 Apr	19:00	Latvia	0–3	Russia	15–25	16–25	14–25			45–75	Report
27 Apr	15:00	Israel	3–0	Latvia	29–27	25–18	25–11			79–56	Report
27 Apr	17:30	Estonia	0–3	Russia	26–28	15–25	18–25			59–78	Report

=== Pool B ===
- Venue: Pala Principi, Porto Potenza Picena, Italy

Pos	Team	Pld	W	L	Pts	SW	SL	SR	SPW	SPL	SPR	Qualification
1	Poland	2	2	0	6	6	1	6.000	175	140	1.250	2014 European Championship
2	Italy	2	1	1	2	4	5	0.800	197	193	1.021	Third round
3	Austria	2	0	2	1	2	6	0.333	141	180	0.783	

Date	Time		Score		Set 1	Set 2	Set 3	Set 4	Set 5	Total	Report
25 Apr	17:00	Austria	2–3	Italy	25–18	25–22	18–25	14–25	11–15	93–105	Report
26 Apr	17:00	Poland	3–0	Austria	25–20	25–14	25–14			75–48	Report
27 Apr	17:00	Italy	1–3	Poland	25–19	29–31	23–25	15–25		92–100	Report

=== Pool C ===
- Venue: Sala Polivalenta, Piatra Neamț, Romania

Pos	Team	Pld	W	L	Pts	SW	SL	SR	SPW	SPL	SPR	Qualification
1	Romania	3	3	0	8	9	3	3.000	281	234	1.201	2014 European Championship
2	Spain	3	2	1	7	8	3	2.667	245	218	1.124	Third round
3	Norway	3	1	2	3	3	7	0.429	205	228	0.899	
4	Denmark	3	0	3	0	2	9	0.222	218	269	0.810	

Date	Time		Score		Set 1	Set 2	Set 3	Set 4	Set 5	Total	Report
25 Apr	16:30	Denmark	0–3	Spain	20–25	17–25	14–25			51–75	Report
25 Apr	19:00	Romania	3–0	Norway	25–22	25–7	25–21			75–50	Report
26 Apr	16:30	Spain	3–0	Norway	25–20	25–18	25–21			75–59	Report
26 Apr	19:00	Denmark	1–3	Romania	23–25	25–23	23–25	18–25		89–98	Report
27 Apr	16:30	Norway	3–1	Denmark	25–14	25–20	21–25	25–19		96–78	Report
27 Apr	19:00	Spain	2–3	Romania	15–25	25–22	18–25	25–21	12–15	95–108	Report

=== Pool D ===
- Venue: Dunaújvárosi Sportcsarnok, Dunaújváros, Hungary

Pos	Team	Pld	W	L	Pts	SW	SL	SR	SPW	SPL	SPR	Qualification
1	Slovenia	3	2	1	5	7	6	1.167	287	261	1.100	2014 European Championship
2	Serbia	3	2	1	5	7	6	1.167	281	280	1.004	Third round
3	Finland	3	1	2	4	7	8	0.875	302	326	0.926	Third round
4	Hungary	3	1	2	4	6	7	0.857	288	291	0.990	

Date	Time		Score		Set 1	Set 2	Set 3	Set 4	Set 5	Total	Report
25 Apr	17:30	Serbia	3–1	Hungary	25–20	25–23	25–27	25–20		100–90	Report
25 Apr	19:30	Finland	2–3	Slovenia	25–22	26–24	22–25	19–25	5–15	97–111	Report
26 Apr	17:30	Hungary	3–1	Slovenia	25–20	25–19	10–25	25–19		85–83	Report
26 Apr	19:30	Serbia	3–2	Finland	25–16	25–15	16–25	18–25	18–16	102–97	Report
27 Apr	17:30	Hungary	2–3	Finland	26–28	25–17	25–22	23–25	14–16	113–108	Report
27 Apr	19:30	Slovenia	3–1	Serbia	25–18	18–25	25–19	25–17		93–79	Report

=== Pool E ===
- Venue: Pavilhao do, Castelo da Maia, Portugal

Pos	Team	Pld	W	L	Pts	SW	SL	SR	SPW	SPL	SPR	Qualification
1	France	3	3	0	8	9	2	4.500	266	222	1.198	2014 European Championship
2	Belgium	3	2	1	6	6	3	2.000	212	176	1.205	Third round
3	Portugal	3	1	2	3	5	8	0.625	271	291	0.931	
4	Sweden	3	0	3	1	2	9	0.222	203	263	0.772	

Date	Time		Score		Set 1	Set 2	Set 3	Set 4	Set 5	Total	Report
25 Apr	17:00	France	3–0	Belgium	25–22	25–22	25–18			75–62	Report
25 Apr	19:30	Portugal	3–2	Sweden	22–25	25–16	24–26	25–18	17–15	113–100	Report
26 Apr	15:00	Belgium	3–0	Sweden	25–11	25–18	25–22			75–51	Report
26 Apr	17:30	France	3–2	Portugal	23–25	25–23	25–17	26–28	17–15	116–108	Report
27 Apr	15:00	Sweden	0–3	France	21–25	11–25	20–25			52–75	Report
27 Apr	17:30	Belgium	3–0	Portugal	25–19	25–13	25–18			75–50	Report

=== Pool F ===
- Venue: Hristo Botev, Sofia, Bulgaria

Pos	Team	Pld	W	L	Pts	SW	SL	SR	SPW	SPL	SPR	Qualification
1	Bulgaria	3	3	0	8	9	2	4.500	254	220	1.155	2014 European Championship
2	Greece	3	2	1	7	8	3	2.667	256	237	1.080	Third round
3	Netherlands	3	1	2	3	3	6	0.500	187	214	0.874	
4	England	3	0	3	0	0	9	0.000	203	229	0.886	

Date	Time		Score		Set 1	Set 2	Set 3	Set 4	Set 5	Total	Report
25 Apr	17:00	Greece	2–3	Bulgaria	25–17	25–22	23–25	18–25	12–15	103–104	Report
25 Apr	19:30	Netherlands	3–0	England	25–21	26–24	25–19			76–64	Report
26 Apr	17:00	Bulgaria	3–0	England	25–22	25–23	25–23			75–68	Report
26 Apr	19:30	Greece	3–0	Netherlands	25–23	25–19	25–20			75–62	Report
27 Apr	16:00	Bulgaria	3–0	Netherlands	25–12	25–23	25–14			75–49	Report
27 Apr	18:30	England	0–3	Greece	26–28	23–25	22–25			71–78	Report

=== Pool G ===
- Venue: TVF SC Baskent Sports Hall, Ankara, Turkey

Pos	Team	Pld	W	L	Pts	SW	SL	SR	SPW	SPL	SPR	Qualification
1	Turkey	3	3	0	9	9	1	9.000	247	171	1.444	2014 European Championship
2	Germany	3	2	1	6	7	4	1.750	260	225	1.156	Third round
3	Croatia	3	1	2	3	4	6	0.667	198	227	0.872	
4	Montenegro	3	0	3	0	0	9	0.000	143	225	0.636	

Date	Time		Score		Set 1	Set 2	Set 3	Set 4	Set 5	Total	Report
25 Apr	15:00	Croatia	1–3	Germany	23–25	26–24	16–25	15–25		80–99	Report
25 Apr	18:00	Montenegro	0–3	Turkey	12–25	17–25	13–25			42–75	Report
26 Apr	17:00	Germany	3–0	Montenegro	25–13	25–17	25–18			75–48	Report
26 Apr	19:30	Croatia	0–3	Turkey	12–25	14–25	17–25			43–75	Report
27 Apr	15:00	Montenegro	0–3	Croatia	19–25	15–25	19–25			53–75	Report
27 Apr	18:00	Turkey	3–1	Germany	25–22	22–25	25–21	25–18		97–86	Report

=== Ranking of the third placed teams ===
Pos	Team	Pld	W	L	Pts	SW	SL	SR	SPW	SPL	SPR	Qualification
1	Finland	2	0	2	2	4	6	0.667	194	213	0.911	Third round
2	Portugal	2	0	2	1	2	6	0.333	158	191	0.827	
3	Israel	2	0	2	1	2	6	0.333	150	184	0.815	
4	Austria	2	0	2	1	2	6	0.333	141	180	0.783	
5	Croatia	2	0	2	0	1	6	0.167	123	174	0.707	
6	Netherlands	2	0	2	0	0	6	0.000	111	150	0.740	
7	Norway	2	0	2	0	0	6	0.000	109	150	0.727	

== Third round ==
The 3rd Round consisted of 2 tournaments of 4 teams and took place between 11 – 13 July 2014.

The 1st placed teams of each Pool as well as the 2nd placed team with the best score among the 3rd Round Pools qualified for the Final Round.

- Pools composition

Pool H	Pool I
Italy	Belgium
Germany	Serbia
Estonia	Finland
Spain	Greece

All times are local.

=== Pool H ===
- Venue: PalaRoma, Pescara, Italy

Pos	Team	Pld	W	L	Pts	SW	SL	SR	SPW	SPL	SPR	Qualification
1	Italy	3	3	0	8	9	4	2.250	316	242	1.306	2014 European Championship
2	Germany	3	1	2	4	5	6	0.833	236	249	0.948	
3	Estonia	3	1	2	3	5	6	0.833	213	256	0.832	
4	Spain	3	1	2	3	4	7	0.571	231	249	0.928	

Date	Time		Score		Set 1	Set 2	Set 3	Set 4	Set 5	Total	Report
11 Jul	16:00	Germany	3–0	Spain	25–19	25–17	25–18			75–54	Report
11 Jul	18:30	Italy	3–1	Estonia	24–26	25–8	25–13	25–14		99–61	Report
12 Jul	16:00	Spain	3–1	Estonia	25–12	25–20	21–25	25–20		96–77	Report
12 Jul	18:30	Germany	2–3	Italy	31–29	21–25	12–25	28–26	8–15	100–120	Report
13 Jul	16:00	Estonia	3–0	Germany	25–17	25–22	25–22			75–61	Report
13 Jul	18:30	Spain	1–3	Italy	15–25	25–22	19–25	22–25		81–97	Report

=== Pool I ===
- Venue: Sportsko Poslovni Centar, Ruma, Serbia

Pos	Team	Pld	W	L	Pts	SW	SL	SR	SPW	SPL	SPR	Qualification
1	Belgium	3	3	0	9	9	2	4.500	270	245	1.102	2014 European Championship
2	Serbia	3	2	1	6	7	3	2.333	240	208	1.154	2014 European Championship
3	Finland	3	1	2	3	3	6	0.500	199	219	0.909	
4	Greece	3	0	3	0	1	9	0.111	211	248	0.851	

Date	Time		Score		Set 1	Set 2	Set 3	Set 4	Set 5	Total	Report
11 Jul	16:30	Greece	1–3	Belgium	23–25	25–20	21–25	23–25		92–95	Report
11 Jul	19:00	Serbia	3–0	Finland	25–18	25–17	25–23			75–58	Report
12 Jul	16:30	Belgium	3–0	Finland	32–30	25–17	25–16			82–63	Report
12 Jul	19:00	Greece	0–3	Serbia	20–25	17–25	20–25			57–75	Report
13 Jul	16:30	Finland	3–0	Greece	28–26	25–16	25–20			78–62	Report
13 Jul	19:00	Belgium	3–1	Serbia	25–19	25–23	18–25	25–23		93–90	Report
