= 2016 Men's U20 Volleyball European Championship Qualification =

This is an article about qualification for the 2016 Men's U20 Volleyball European Championship.

== Qualification summary ==
- Belarus
- Bulgaria
- Czech Republic
- France
- Germany
- Italy
- Poland
- Russia
- Serbia
- Slovenia
- Turkey
- Ukraine

== Pool standing procedure ==
1. Number of matches won
2. Match points
3. Sets ratio
4. Points ratio
5. Result of the last match between the tied teams

Match won 3–0 or 3–1: 3 match points for the winner, 0 match points for the loser
Match won 3–2: 2 match points for the winner, 1 match point for the loser

== Direct qualification ==
Host country, Bulgaria, qualified for final round directly.

== First round ==
First round was held 7–9 January 2016. 6 teams competed in 2 first round tournaments consisting of 3 teams. The winners of each pools qualified for the second round.

- Pools composition

Pool 1	Pool 2
Norway	Belarus
Switzerland	England
Georgia	Kosovo

All times are local.

=== Pool 1 ===
- Venue: BBC Arena, Schaffhausen, Switzerland

Pos	Team	Pld	W	L	Pts	SW	SL	SR	SPW	SPL	SPR	Qualification
1	Norway	2	2	0	5	6	2	3.000	179	168	1.065	Second round
2	Switzerland	2	1	1	4	5	3	1.667	185	160	1.156	
3	Georgia	2	0	2	0	0	6	0.000	114	150	0.760	

Date	Time		Score		Set 1	Set 2	Set 3	Set 4	Set 5	Total	Report
7 Jan	19:30	Switzerland	3–0	Georgia	25–17	25–21	25–18			75–56	Report
8 Jan	19:30	Georgia	0–3	Norway	17–25	22–25	19–25			58–75	Report
9 Jan	18:00	Norway	3–2	Switzerland	25–20	27–29	11–25	25–22	16–14	104–110	Report

=== Pool 2 ===
- Venue: Hala Widowiskowo Sportowa, Chęciny, Poland

Pos	Team	Pld	W	L	Pts	SW	SL	SR	SPW	SPL	SPR	Qualification
1	Belarus	4	2	2	6	6	6	1.000	150	73	2.055	Second round
2	England	2	1	1	3	3	3	1.000	117	117	1.000	
3	Kosovo	2	0	2	0	0	6	0.000	73	150	0.487	

Date	Time		Score		Set 1	Set 2	Set 3	Set 4	Set 5	Total	Report
7 Jan	18:00	Belarus	3–0	Kosovo	25–6	25–10	25–15			75–31	Report
8 Jan	18:00	England	0–3	Belarus	19–25	8–25	15–25			42–75	Report
9 Jan	18:00	Kosovo	0–3	England	14–25	13–25	15–25			42–75	Report

== Second round ==
Second round was held 31 March – 3 April 2016. 28 teams competed in 7 pools of 4 teams. The winners of each pools qualified for final round. The 2nd placed teams of each pool and the best 3rd placed team qualified for the third round.

- Pools composition

Pool A	Pool B	Pool C	Pool D	Pool E	Pool F	Pool G
Russia	Italy	Turkey	Poland	France	Belgium	Serbia
Romania	Spain	Czech Republic	Germany	Austria	Slovenia	Greece
Israel	Portugal	Netherlands	Denmark	Slovakia	Finland	Estonia
Croatia	Sweden	Latvia	Hungary	Norway	Ukraine	Belarus

All times are local.

=== Pool A ===
- Venue: Dvorana Gimnasium, Rovinj, Croatia

Pos	Team	Pld	W	L	Pts	SW	SL	SR	SPW	SPL	SPR	Qualification
1	Russia	3	3	0	9	9	2	4.500	274	220	1.245	2016 European Championship
2	Romania	3	2	1	6	7	3	2.333	234	196	1.194	Third round
3	Croatia	3	1	2	3	4	6	0.667	213	229	0.930	
4	Israel	3	0	3	0	0	9	0.000	149	225	0.662	

Date	Time		Score		Set 1	Set 2	Set 3	Set 4	Set 5	Total	Report
31 Mar	15:00	Romania	1–3	Russia	14–25	22–25	26–24	22–25		84–99	Report
31 Mar	20:00	Croatia	3–0	Israel	25–16	25–18	25–20			75–54	Report
1 Apr	17:30	Russia	3–0	Israel	25–15	25–19	25–18			75–52	Report
1 Apr	20:00	Romania	3–0	Croatia	25–17	25–20	25–17			75–54	Report
2 Apr	15:00	Israel	0–3	Romania	7–25	15–25	21–25			43–75	Report
3 Apr	20:00	Russia	3–1	Croatia	25–21	25–14	25–27	25–22		100–84	Report

=== Pool B ===
- Venue: PalaVesuvio, Naples, Italy

Pos	Team	Pld	W	L	Pts	SW	SL	SR	SPW	SPL	SPR	Qualification
1	Italy	3	3	0	9	9	0	MAX	225	164	1.372	2016 European Championship
2	Spain	3	2	1	6	6	3	2.000	216	197	1.096	Third round
3	Portugal	3	1	2	2	3	8	0.375	231	257	0.899	
4	Sweden	3	0	3	1	2	9	0.222	201	255	0.788	

Date	Time		Score		Set 1	Set 2	Set 3	Set 4	Set 5	Total	Report
31 Mar	16:00	Portugal	0–3	Spain	18–25	31–33	17–25			66–83	Report
31 Mar	18:30	Italy	3–0	Sweden	25–15	25–14	25–17			75–46	Report
1 Apr	17:00	Spain	3–0	Sweden	25–20	25–19	25–17			75–56	Report
1 Apr	19:30	Portugal	0–3	Italy	18–25	19–25	23–25			60–75	Report
2 Apr	17:00	Sweden	2–3	Portugal	25–22	18–25	19–25	25–18	12–15	99–105	Report
2 Apr	19:30	Spain	0–3	Italy	19–25	18–25	21–25			58–75	Report

=== Pool C ===
- Venue: Ali Yucel Sports Hall, Tokat, Turkey

Pos	Team	Pld	W	L	Pts	SW	SL	SR	SPW	SPL	SPR	Qualification
1	Turkey	3	3	0	9	9	2	4.500	262	224	1.170	2016 European Championship
2	Czech Republic	3	2	1	6	6	4	1.500	235	198	1.187	Third round
3	Netherlands	3	1	2	3	4	6	0.667	198	233	0.850	
4	Latvia	3	0	3	0	2	9	0.222	224	264	0.848	

Date	Time		Score		Set 1	Set 2	Set 3	Set 4	Set 5	Total	Report
1 Apr	16:00	Latvia	1–3	Turkey	17–25	23–25	25–17	17–25		82–92	Report
1 Apr	18:30	Czech Republic	3–0	Netherlands	25–14	25–17	25–13			75–44	Report
2 Apr	15:00	Turkey	3–1	Netherlands	20–25	25–22	25–10	25–21		95–78	Report
2 Apr	17:30	Latvia	1–3	Czech Republic	25–21	13–25	19–25	22–25		79–96	Report
3 Apr	15:00	Turkey	3–0	Czech Republic	25–23	25–22	25–19			75–64	Report
3 Apr	17:30	Netherlands	3–0	Latvia	25–18	25–21	26–24			76–63	Report

=== Pool D ===
- Venue: Carl-von-Weinberg Halle, Frankfurt, Germany

Pos	Team	Pld	W	L	Pts	SW	SL	SR	SPW	SPL	SPR	Qualification
1	Poland	3	3	0	9	9	0	MAX	225	160	1.406	2016 European Championship
2	Germany	3	2	1	6	6	5	1.200	244	240	1.017	Third round
3	Denmark	3	1	2	3	4	6	0.667	228	220	1.036	Third round
4	Hungary	3	0	3	0	1	9	0.111	170	247	0.688	

Date	Time		Score		Set 1	Set 2	Set 3	Set 4	Set 5	Total	Report
1 Apr	16:00	Poland	3–0	Denmark	25–22	25–20	25–18			75–60	Report
1 Apr	18:30	Hungary	1–3	Germany	22–25	25–22	12–25	13–25		72–97	Report
2 Apr	16:00	Denmark	1–3	Germany	20–25	25–23	22–25	26–28		93–101	Report
2 Apr	18:30	Poland	3–0	Hungary	25–18	25–13	25–23			75–54	Report
3 Apr	15:00	Denmark	3–0	Hungary	25–19	25–18	25–7			75–44	Report
3 Apr	17:30	Germany	0–3	Poland	17–25	17–25	12–25			46–75	Report

=== Pool E ===
- Venue: Landessportzentrum Viva, Steinbrunn, Austria

Pos	Team	Pld	W	L	Pts	SW	SL	SR	SPW	SPL	SPR	Qualification
1	France	3	3	0	9	9	1	9.000	257	207	1.242	2016 European Championship
2	Slovakia	3	2	1	6	6	3	2.000	213	173	1.231	Third round
3	Norway	3	1	2	3	3	7	0.429	197	226	0.872	
4	Austria	3	0	3	0	2	9	0.222	215	276	0.779	

Date	Time		Score		Set 1	Set 2	Set 3	Set 4	Set 5	Total	Report
31 Mar	16:00	Austria	1–3	Norway	18–25	25–19	19–25	14–25		76–94	Report
31 Mar	18:30	Slovakia	0–3	France	22–25	18–25	23–25			63–75	Report
1 Apr	16:00	Norway	0–3	France	18–25	17–25	18–25			53–75	Report
1 Apr	18:30	Austria	0–3	Slovakia	21–25	14–25	13–25			48–75	Report
2 Apr	16:00	Norway	0–3	Slovakia	16–25	17–25	17–25			50–75	Report
2 Apr	18:30	France	3–1	Austria	25–15	23–25	34–32	25–19		107–91	Report

=== Pool F ===
- Venue: Sportna Dvorana, Nova Gorica, Slovenia

Pos	Team	Pld	W	L	Pts	SW	SL	SR	SPW	SPL	SPR	Qualification
1	Slovenia	3	3	0	8	9	3	3.000	295	254	1.161	2016 European Championship
2	Ukraine	3	2	1	6	7	4	1.750	258	238	1.084	Third round
3	Finland	3	1	2	3	5	8	0.625	298	316	0.943	
4	Belgium	3	0	3	1	3	9	0.333	242	285	0.849	

Date	Time		Score		Set 1	Set 2	Set 3	Set 4	Set 5	Total	Report
1 Apr	15:00	Belgium	2–3	Finland	25–20	29–31	25–21	24–26	10–15	113–113	Report
1 Apr	18:00	Slovenia	3–1	Ukraine	21–25	25–22	25–15	25–20		96–82	Report
2 Apr	15:00	Finland	0–3	Ukraine	17–25	27–29	19–25			63–79	Report
2 Apr	18:00	Belgium	0–3	Slovenia	17–25	16–25	17–25			50–75	Report
3 Apr	15:00	Ukraine	3–1	Belgium	25–19	22–25	25–19	25–16		97–79	Report
3 Apr	18:00	Finland	2–3	Slovenia	25–27	23–25	25–23	30–28	19–21	122–124	Report

=== Pool G ===
- Venue: Sportska Hala Vlade Divac, Vrnjačka Banja, Serbia

Pos	Team	Pld	W	L	Pts	SW	SL	SR	SPW	SPL	SPR	Qualification
1	Serbia	3	3	0	8	9	2	4.500	254	202	1.257	2016 European Championship
2	Belarus	3	2	1	5	8	7	1.143	310	309	1.003	Third round
3	Estonia	3	1	2	3	5	8	0.625	262	281	0.932	
4	Greece	3	0	3	2	4	9	0.444	244	278	0.878	

Date	Time		Score		Set 1	Set 2	Set 3	Set 4	Set 5	Total	Report
31 Mar	20:00	Estonia	3–2	Greece	18–25	22–25	25–14	25–21	15–8	105–93	Report
1 Apr	20:00	Serbia	3–2	Belarus	25–20	20–25	19–25	25–17	15–12	104–99	Report
2 Apr	17:30	Greece	2–3	Belarus	25–20	25–13	20–25	15–25	11–15	96–98	Report
2 Apr	20:00	Estonia	0–3	Serbia	11–25	20–25	17–25			48–75	Report
3 Apr	15:00	Belarus	3–2	Estonia	31–29	20–25	25–17	22–25	15–13	113–109	Report
3 Apr	17:30	Greece	0–3	Serbia	22–25	12–25	21–25			55–75	Report

=== Ranking of the third placed teams ===
Pos	Team	Pld	W	L	Pts	SW	SL	SR	SPW	SPL	SPR	Qualification
1	Denmark	3	1	2	3	4	6	0.667	228	220	1.036	Third round
2	Croatia	3	1	2	3	4	6	0.667	213	229	0.930	
3	Netherlands	3	1	2	3	4	6	0.667	198	233	0.850	
4	Finland	3	1	2	3	5	8	0.625	298	316	0.943	
5	Estonia	3	1	2	3	5	8	0.625	262	281	0.932	
6	Norway	3	1	2	3	3	7	0.429	197	226	0.872	
7	Portugal	3	1	2	2	3	8	0.375	231	257	0.899	

== Third round ==
Third round will be held 8–10 July 2016. 8 teams will compete in 2 pools of 4 teams. The winners and runners-up of each pools will qualify for the final round.

- Pools composition

Pool H	Pool I
Spain	Belarus
Germany	Czech Republic
Romania	Slovakia
Ukraine	Denmark

All times are local.

=== Pool H ===
- Venue: Polideportivo Pilar Fernandez, Valladolid, Spain

Pos	Team	Pld	W	L	Pts	SW	SL	SR	SPW	SPL	SPR	Qualification
1	Germany	3	3	0	9	9	1	9.000	248	208	1.192	2016 European Championship
2	Ukraine	3	1	2	4	6	7	0.857	282	288	0.979	2016 European Championship
3	Romania	3	1	2	3	4	7	0.571	247	261	0.946	
4	Spain	3	1	2	2	4	8	0.500	247	267	0.925	

Date	Time		Score		Set 1	Set 2	Set 3	Set 4	Set 5	Total	Report
8 Jul	17:00	Romania	0–3	Germany	15–25	27–29	19–25			61–79	Report
8 Jul	19:30	Spain	3–2	Ukraine	25–20	15–25	25–16	22–25	15–12	102–98	Report
9 Jul	17:00	Germany	3–1	Ukraine	25–17	25–21	19–25	25–23		94–86	Report
9 Jul	19:30	Romania	3–1	Spain	25–17	19–25	25–22	25–20		94–84	Report
10 Jul	17:00	Ukraine	3–1	Romania	25–23	25–23	23–25	25–21		98–92	Report
10 Jul	19:30	Germany	3–0	Spain	25–20	25–20	25–21			75–61	Report

=== Pool I ===
- Venue: Minsk Sports Palace, Minsk, Belarus

Pos	Team	Pld	W	L	Pts	SW	SL	SR	SPW	SPL	SPR	Qualification
1	Czech Republic	3	3	0	9	9	0	MAX	225	174	1.293	2016 European Championship
2	Belarus	3	2	1	5	6	6	1.000	255	275	0.927	2016 European Championship
3	Denmark	3	1	2	3	4	6	0.667	230	240	0.958	
4	Slovakia	3	0	3	1	2	9	0.222	234	255	0.918	

Date	Time		Score		Set 1	Set 2	Set 3	Set 4	Set 5	Total	Report
8 Jul	16:00	Slovakia	0–3	Denmark	23–25	19–25	26–28			68–78	Report
8 Jul	18:30	Belarus	0–3	Czech Republic	17–25	19–25	20–25			56–75	Report
9 Jul	16:00	Denmark	0–3	Czech Republic	18–25	20–25	21–25			59–75	Report
9 Jul	18:30	Slovakia	2–3	Belarus	22–25	22–25	25–20	25–17	13–15	107–102	Report
10 Jul	16:00	Czech Republic	3–0	Slovakia	25–20	25–23	25–16			75–59	Report
10 Jul	18:30	Denmark	1–3	Belarus	26–28	21–25	25–19	21–25		93–97	Report
