= Łukasz Rajchelt =

Polish volleyball player (born 1999)

Personal information
- Full name: Łukasz Rajchelt
- Nationality: Polish
- Born: February 12, 1999 (age 27) Łódź, Poland
- Height: 1.88 m (6 ft 2 in)
- Weight: 91 kg (201 lb)
- Spike: 328 cm (129 in)
- Block: 0 cm (0 in)

Volleyball information
- Position: Setter
- Current club: SMS PZPS Spała

Career
- Years: Team
- 2002– 2015–: KS Wifama Łódź; SMS PZPS Spała

National team
- Years: Team
- 2017 2016: Poland U19; Poland U21
- Updated on 2 July 2017

Łukasz Rajchelt (born 12 February 1999) is a Polish volleyball player, a member of Poland men's national under-19 volleyball team, U20 European Champion 2016.

== Career ==
=== National team ===
On September 10, 2016, he achieved title of the 2016 CEV U20 European Champion after winning 7 of 7 matches in tournament and beating Ukraine U21 in the finale (3-1).

== Sporting achievements ==
=== National team ===
- 2016 CEV U20 European Championship
