= 1996 Men's Junior European Volleyball Championship =

Tournament details
- Host country: Israel
- Dates: August 28 – September 5
- Teams: 12
- Venues: 2 (in 2 host cities)

Final positions
- Champions: Poland (1st title)

The 1996 Men's Junior European Volleyball Championship was the 15th edition of the Men's Junior European Volleyball Championship, organised by Europe's governing volleyball body, the CEV. It was held in Netanya and Ranana in Israel from August 28 to September 5, 1996.

Poland won their first title in the tournament by defeating Italy.

== Preliminary round ==
- All times are Israel Summer Time (UTC+03:00)

=== Pool I ===
Pos	Team	Pld	W	L	Pts	SPW	SPL	SPR	SW	SL	SR	Qualification
1	Poland	5	4	1	12	248	173	1.434	12	6	2.000	Semifinals
2	Italy	5	3	2	10	239	210	1.138	12	6	2.000	Semifinals
3	Greece	5	3	2	9	211	211	1.000	10	7	1.429	5th to 8th classification
4	France	5	2	3	5	203	243	0.835	7	11	0.636	5th to 8th classification
5	Finland	5	2	3	5	212	244	0.869	6	12	0.500	
6	Belarus	5	1	4	4	271	303	0.894	9	14	0.643	

Date	Time		Score		Set 1	Set 2	Set 3	Set 4	Set 5	Total	Report
28 Aug	15:00	France	3–0	Poland	15–10	15–11	15–6			45–27	Report
28 Aug	17:30	Belarus	3–2	Italy	8–15	7–15	17–16	15–4	15–10	62–60	Report
28 Aug	20:00	Greece	3–0	Finland	15–10	15–6	15–8			45–24	Report
29 Aug	15:00	Poland	3–1	Belarus	15–4	13–15	15–6	15–7		58–32	Report
29 Aug	17:30	Greece	3–0	France	15–12	15–12	15–13			45–37	Report
29 Aug	20:00	Italy	3–0	Finland	15–10	15–12	15–12			45–34	Report
30 Aug	14:00	Poland	3–1	Greece	15–5	15–7	13–15	15–2		58–29	Report
30 Aug	17:30	Finland	3–2	Belarus	15–13	12–15	15–8	14–16	15–12	71–64	Report
30 Aug	20:00	Italy	3–0	France	15–10	15–2	15–5			45–17	Report
1 Sep	15:00	Poland	3–0	Finland	15–8	15–7	15–8			45–23	Report
1 Sep	17:30	France	3–2	Belarus	15–13	15–6	7–15	3–15	19–17	59–66	Report
1 Sep	20:00	Italy	3–0	France	15–13	15–11	15–13			45–37	Report
2 Sep	15:00	Finland	3–1	France	15–8	16–14	14–16	15–7		60–45	Report
2 Sep	17:30	Greece	3–1	Belarus	15–9	10–15	15–11	15–12		55–47	Report
2 Sep	20:00	Poland	3–1	Italy	16–14	15–6	14–16	15–8		60–44	Report

=== Pool II ===
Pos	Team	Pld	W	L	Pts	SPW	SPL	SPR	SW	SL	SR	Qualification
1	Russia	5	5	0	15	225	105	2.143	15	0	MAX	Semifinals
2	Netherlands	5	4	1	11	225	214	1.051	11	7	1.571	Semifinals
3	Yugoslavia	5	3	2	8	238	220	1.082	9	9	1.000	5th to 8th classification
4	Belgium	5	3	2	7	214	254	0.843	9	10	0.900	5th to 8th classification
5	Ukraine	5	1	4	4	237	231	1.026	7	12	0.583	
6	Israel	5	0	5	1	131	246	0.533	2	14	0.143	

Date	Time		Score		Set 1	Set 2	Set 3	Set 4	Set 5	Total	Report
28 Aug	15:00	Russia	3–0	Netherlands	15–5	15–6	15–7			45–18	Report
28 Aug	17:30	Yugoslavia	3–1	Ukraine	17–15	13–15	15–10	15–6		60–46	Report
28 Aug	20:00	Belgium	3–2	Israel	15–11	15–6	12–15	7–15	17–15	66–62	Report
29 Aug	15:00	Yugoslavia	0–3	Russia	9–15	5–15	4–15			18–45	Report
29 Aug	17:30	Belgium	3–2	Ukraine	15–13	9–15	6–15	15–13	15–13	60–69	Report
29 Aug	20:00	Netherlands	3–0	Israel	15–4	15–9	15–5			45–18	Report
30 Aug	13:00	Yugoslavia	0–3	Belgium	13–15	9–15	11–15			33–45	Report
30 Aug	15:30	Russia	3–0	Israel	15–8	15–8	15–2			45–18	Report
30 Aug	18:00	Netherlands	3–1	Ukraine	15–8	6–15	15–9	15–9		51–41	Report
1 Sep	15:00	Russia	3–0	Belgium	15–6	15–5	15–4			45–15	Report
1 Sep	17:30	Yugoslavia	3–2	Netherlands	13–15	15–0	16–17	16–14	22–20	82–66	Report
1 Sep	20:00	Ukraine	3–0	Israel	15–2	15–5	15–8			45–15	Report
2 Sep	15:00	Netherlands	3–0	Belgium	15–8	15–10	15–10			45–28	Report
2 Sep	17:30	Russia	3–0	Netherlands	15–13	15–12	15–11			45–36	Report
2 Sep	20:00	Yugoslavia	3–0	Israel	15–4	15–6	15–8			45–18	Report

== Final round ==
- All times are Israel Summer Time (UTC+03:00)

=== 9th–12th semifinals ===
Date	Time		Score		Set 1	Set 2	Set 3	Set 4	Set 5	Total	Report
4 Sep	17:30	Finland	3–0	Israel	15–4	15–12	15–6			45–22	Report
4 Sep	20:00	Ukraine	0–3	Belarus	13–15	11–15	8–15			32–45	Report

==== 11th place match ====
Date	Time		Score		Set 1	Set 2	Set 3	Set 4	Set 5	Total	Report
5 Sep	10:00	Ukraine	3–1	Israel	9–15	15–1	15–12	15–4		54–32	Report

==== 9th place match ====
Date	Time		Score		Set 1	Set 2	Set 3	Set 4	Set 5	Total	Report
5 Sep	10:00	Belarus	3–2	Finland	3–15	15–6	14–16	16–14	16–14	64–65	Report

=== 5th–8th semifinals ===
Date	Time		Score		Set 1	Set 2	Set 3	Set 4	Set 5	Total	Report
4 Sep	15:00	Yugoslavia	3–1	France	15–3	7–15	15–11	16–14		53–43	Report
4 Sep	15:00	Greece	3–1	Belgium	15–12	15–7	13–15	15–7		58–41	Report

==== 7th place match ====
Date	Time		Score		Set 1	Set 2	Set 3	Set 4	Set 5	Total	Report
5 Sep	12:30	France	3–0	Belgium	15–7	15–8	15–4			45–19	Report

==== 5th place match ====
Date	Time		Score		Set 1	Set 2	Set 3	Set 4	Set 5	Total	Report
5 Sep	15:00	Yugoslavia	0–3	Greece	13–15	11–15	7–15			31–45	Report

=== Final ===
Semifinals
Ranana
Poland	3
Netherlands	0
Ranana
Russia	1
Italy	3

Final
Ranana
Poland	3
Italy	0
Third place
Ranana
Netherlands	0
Russia	3

==== Semifinals ====
Date	Time		Score		Set 1	Set 2	Set 3	Set 4	Set 5	Total	Report
4 Sep	17:30	Poland	3–0	Netherlands	15–6	15–7	15–10			45–23	Report
4 Sep	20:00	Italy	1–3	Russia	15–5	9–15	16–17	12–15		52–52	Report

==== 3rd place match ====
Date	Time		Score		Set 1	Set 2	Set 3	Set 4	Set 5	Total	Report
5 Sep	16:30	Russia	3–0	Netherlands	15–6	15–0	15–12			45–18	Report

==== Final ====
Date	Time		Score		Set 1	Set 2	Set 3	Set 4	Set 5	Total	Report
5 Sep	19:00	Poland	3–1	Italy	15–11	8–15	15–11	15–11		53–48	Report

== Final standing ==
Rank	Team
1st place, gold medalist(s)	Poland
2nd place, silver medalist(s)	Italy
3rd place, bronze medalist(s)	Russia
4	Netherlands
5	Greece
6	Yugoslavia
7	France
8	Belgium
9	Belarus
10	Finland
11	Ukraine
12	Israel

1996 Men's Junior European champions

Poland
1st title

12–man Roster
Michał Chadała, Piotr Gruszka, Krzysztof Ignaczak, Łukasz Kruk, Dawid Murek, Paweł Papke, Marcin Prus, Robert Szczerbaniuk, Bartosz Szcześniewski, Sebastian Świderski, Radosław Wnuk, Paweł Zagumny
Head coach
Ireneusz Mazur
