= Sławomir Busch =

Polish volleyball player (born 1998)

Personal information
- Full name: Sławomir Busch
- Nationality: Polish
- Born: March 3, 1998 (age 28); Nowy Tomyśl, Poland
- Height: 1.90 m (6 ft 3 in)
- Weight: 78 kg (172 lb)
- Spike: 330 cm (130 in)
- Block: 303 cm (119 in)

Volleyball information
- Position: Outside hitter
- Current club: AZS Częstochowa

Career
Years	Teams
2014–2017; 2014–2017; 2017–2020; 2020-	AKS Resovia Rzeszów U23; SMS PZPS Spała; AZS Częstochowa; Avimecc Volley Modica

National team
2016	Poland U21
- Last updated: 2 July 2017

Sławomir Busch (born 3 March 1998) is a Polish volleyball player, a member of Poland men's national under-19 volleyball team and Italian club Avimecc Volley Modica, U20 European Champion 2016.

== Career ==
=== National team ===
On September 10, 2016 he achieved title of the 2016 CEV U20 European Champion after winning 7 of 7 matches in tournament and beating Ukraine U21 in the finale (3-1).

== Sporting achievements ==
=== National team ===
- 2016 CEV U20 European Championship
