= Italy men's national under-21 volleyball team =

Italy U21
- Association: FIPAV
- Confederation: CEV
- Head coach: Michele Zanin

Uniforms
Home	Away	Third

FIVB U21 World Championship
- Appearances: 17 (First in 1985)
- Best result: (gold) (2021)

European U21 / 20 Championship
- Appearances: 29 (First in 1966)
- Best result: (gold) (1992, 2002, 2012, 2022)

The Italy men's national under-21 volleyball team represents Italy in international men's volleyball competitions and friendly matches under the age 21 and it is ruled by the Italian Volleyball Federation That is an affiliate of International Volleyball Federation FIVB and also a part of European Volleyball Confederation CEV.

== Results ==
=== FIVB U21 World Championship ===
Champions Runners-up 3rd place 4th place

FIVB U21 World Championship
Year	Round	Position	Pld	W	L	SW	SL	Squad
(Brazil) 1977	Did not compete							
(United States) 1981	Did not compete							
(Italy) 1985		Runners-up						Squad
(Bahrain) 1987	Did not qualify							
(Greece) 1989		9th place						Squad
(Egypt) 1991	Final	Runners-up						Squad
(Argentina) 1993	Final	Runners-up						Squad
(Malaysia) 1995	Semifinals	3rd place						Squad
(Bahrain) 1997		6th place						Squad
(Thailand) 1999		6th place						Squad
(Poland) 2001	Semifinals	4th place						Squad
(Iran) 2003		13th place						Squad
(India) 2005	Did not qualify							
(Morocco) 2007	Semifinals	4th place						Squad
(India) 2009	Did not qualify							
(Brazil) 2011	Did not qualify							
(Turkey) 2013	Semifinals	3rd place						Squad
(Mexico) 2015		6th place						Squad
(Czech Republic) 2017		9th place						Squad
(Bahrain) 2019	Final	Runners-up						Squad
(Italy) (Bulgaria) 2021	Final	Champions						Squad
(Bahrain) 2023	Final	Runners-up						Squad
(China) 2025	Final	Runners-up						Squad
Total	1 Titles	17/23						

=== European U21 / 20 Championship ===
Champions Runners-up 3rd place 4th place

European U21 / 20 Championship
Year	Round	Position	Pld	W	L	SW	SL	Squad
(Hungary) 1966		8th place						Squad
(Soviet Union) 1969		4th place						Squad
(Spain) 1971		6th place						Squad
(Netherlands) 1973		4th place						Squad
(West Germany) 1975		7th place						Squad
(France) 1977		7th place						Squad
(Portugal) 1979		5th place						Squad
(West Germany) 1982		5th place						Squad
(France) 1984		3rd place						Squad
(Hungary) 1986		6th place						Squad
(Italy) 1988		Runners-up						Squad
(West Germany) 1990		Runners-up						Squad
(Poland) 1992		Champions						Squad
(Turkey) 1994		3rd place						Squad
(Israel) 1996		Runners-up						Squad
(Czech Republic) 1998		6th place						Squad

European U21 / 20 Championship
Year	Round	Position	Pld	W	L	SW	SL	Squad
(Italy) 2000		Runners-up						Squad
(Poland) 2002		Champions						Squad
(Croatia) 2004		8th place						Squad
(Russia) 2006		3rd place						Squad
(Czech Republic) 2008		5th place						Squad
(Belarus) 2010		7th place						Squad
(Denmark) / (Poland) 2012	Final	Champions						Squad
(Czech Republic) / (Slovakia) 2014		5th place						Squad
(Bulgaria) 2016	Semifinals	4th place	7	5	2	18	11	Squad
(Netherlands) (Belgium) 2018	5th–8th places	7th place	7	4	3	18	11	Squad
(Czech Republic) 2020	Final	Runners-up	7	6	1	19	3	Squad
(Italy) 2022	Final	Champions	7	6	1	20	6	Squad
(Greece) (Serbia) 2024	Group stage	5th place	7	5	2	16	7	Squad
Total	4 Titles	29/29						

== Team ==
=== Current squad ===
The following is the Italian roster in the 2017 FIVB Volleyball Men's U21 World Championship.

Head coach: Michele Totire

No.	Name	Date of birth	Height	Weight	Spike	Block	2017 club
1	Davide Gardini	11 February 1999	2.00 m (6 ft 7 in)	80 kg (180 lb)	330 cm (130 in)	310 cm (120 in)	(Italy) Club Italia Roma
2	Alessandro Piccinelli	30 January 1997	1.89 m (6 ft 2 in)	98 kg (216 lb)	315 cm (124 in)	290 cm (110 in)	(Italy) Club Italia Roma
5	Roberto Cominetti	20 April 1997	1.90 m (6 ft 3 in)	78 kg (172 lb)	335 cm (132 in)	315 cm (124 in)	(Italy) Libertas Cantù
6	Riccardo Sbertoli	23 May 1998	1.88 m (6 ft 2 in)	85 kg (187 lb)	326 cm (128 in)	246 cm (97 in)	(Italy) Revivre Milano
7	Francesco Zoppellari	27 May 1997	1.85 m (6 ft 1 in)	79 kg (174 lb)	316 cm (124 in)	300 cm (120 in)	(Italy) Kioene Padova
8	Paolo Zonca	13 May 1997	1.95 m (6 ft 5 in)	86 kg (190 lb)	336 cm (132 in)	315 cm (124 in)	(Italy) Volley Potentino
9	Paolo Di Silvestre	31 January 1998	1.91 m (6 ft 3 in)	86 kg (190 lb)	330 cm (130 in)	325 cm (128 in)	(Italy) Cucine Lube Civitanova
10	Giulio Pinali	2 April 1997	1.99 m (6 ft 6 in)	91 kg (201 lb)	349 cm (137 in)	338 cm (133 in)	(Italy) Azimut Modena
12	Gianluca Galassi (C)	24 July 1997	2.01 m (6 ft 7 in)	94 kg (207 lb)	350 cm (140 in)	325 cm (128 in)	(Italy) Revivre Milano
17	Yuri Romanò	26 July 1997	2.01 m (6 ft 7 in)	89 kg (196 lb)	350 cm (140 in)	343 cm (135 in)	(Italy) Diavoli Rosa Brugherio
18	Gabriele Di Martino	20 July 1997	1.99 m (6 ft 6 in)	88 kg (194 lb)	340 cm (130 in)	320 cm (130 in)	(Italy) LPR Piacenza
19	Roberto Russo	23 February 1997	2.05 m (6 ft 9 in)	80 kg (180 lb)	340 cm (130 in)	320 cm (130 in)	(Italy) Club Italia Roma
