= 2018 Men's U20 Volleyball European Championship Qualification =

This is an article about qualification for the 2018 Men's U20 Volleyball European Championship.

== Qualification summary ==
- Belarus
- Belgium
- Czech Republic
- Finland
- France
- Germany
- Italy
- Netherlands
- Poland
- Portugal
- Russia
- Turkey

== Pool standing procedure ==
1. Number of matches won
2. Match points
3. Sets ratio
4. Points ratio
5. Result of the last match between the tied teams

Match won 3–0 or 3–1: 3 match points for the winner, 0 match points for the loser
Match won 3–2: 2 match points for the winner, 1 match point for the loser

== Direct qualification ==
Host countries, Netherlands and Belgium, qualified for final round directly.

== Qualification ==
The winners of each pools qualified for final round. The 2nd placed teams of each pool qualified for the next round.

- Pools composition

Pool A	Pool B	Pool C	Pool D	Pool E	Pool F	Pool G	Pool H
Italy	Russia	Czech Rep	France	Germany	Serbia	Turkey	Poland
Bulgaria	Estonia	Denmark	Slovenia	Romania	Portugal	Slovakia	Ukraine
Spain	Hungary	Finland	Latvia	Austria	Norway	Greece	Croatia
Switzerland	Israel		Montenegro	Sweden			Belarus

== First round ==
=== Pool A ===
Pos	Team	Pld	W	L	Pts	SW	SL	SR	SPW	SPL	SPR	Qualification
1	Italy	3	3	0	9	9	1	9.000	246	185	1.330	2018 European Championship
2	Spain	3	2	1	5	7	5	1.400	256	256	1.000	Second round
3	Bulgaria	3	1	2	4	5	7	0.714	253	258	0.981	
4	Switzerland	3	0	3	0	1	9	0.111	192	248	0.774	

Date	Time		Score		Set 1	Set 2	Set 3	Set 4	Set 5	Total	Report
27 Apr	16:00	Bulgaria	3–1	Switzerland	23–25	25–15	25–18	25–19		98–77	Report
27 Apr	19:00	Italy	3–1	Spain	25–21	25–18	21–25	25–11		96–75	Report
28 Apr	16:00	Switzerland	0–3	Spain	16–25	22–25	23–25			61–75	Report
28 Apr	19:00	Bulgaria	0–3	Italy	23–25	16–25	17–25			56–75	Report
29 Apr	16:00	Spain	3–2	Bulgaria	25–20	22–25	19–25	25–17	15–12	106–99	Report
29 Apr	19:00	Switzerland	0–3	Italy	22–25	12–25	20–25			54–75	Report

=== Pool B ===
Pos	Team	Pld	W	L	Pts	SW	SL	SR	SPW	SPL	SPR	Qualification
1	Russia	3	3	0	9	9	1	9.000	247	174	1.420	2018 European Championship
2	Israel	3	2	1	6	6	4	1.500	224	212	1.057	Second round
3	Hungary	3	1	2	3	3	7	0.429	185	239	0.774	
4	Estonia	3	0	3	0	3	9	0.333	256	287	0.892	

Date	Time		Score		Set 1	Set 2	Set 3	Set 4	Set 5	Total	Report
26 Apr	20:00	Estonia	1–3	Hungary	19–25	22–25	25–18	23–25		89–93	Report
27 Apr	15:00	Israel	3–1	Estonia	25–19	21–25	26–24	25–18		97–86	Report
27 Apr	20:00	Hungary	0–3	Russia	17–25	14–25	10–25			41–75	Report
28 Apr	17:30	Russia	3–0	Israel	25–17	25–14	25–21			75–52	Report
29 Apr	15:00	Hungary	0–3	Israel	14–25	19–25	18–25			51–75	Report
29 Apr	17:30	Russia	3–1	Estonia	25–17	20–25	27–25	25–14		97–81	Report

=== Pool C ===
Pos	Team	Pld	W	L	Pts	SW	SL	SR	SPW	SPL	SPR	Qualification
1	Finland	2	1	1	3	4	3	1.333	159	162	0.981	2018 European Championship
2	Czech Republic	2	1	1	3	4	4	1.000	182	179	1.017	Second round
3	Denmark	2	1	1	3	3	4	0.750	157	157	1.000	

Date	Time		Score		Set 1	Set 2	Set 3	Set 4	Set 5	Total	Report
27 Apr	17:00	Finland	3–0	Denmark	25–23	25–22	25–17			75–62	Report
28 Apr	17:00	Denmark	3–1	Czech Republic	20–25	25–21	25–17	25–19		95–82	Report
29 Apr	17:00	Czech Republic	3–1	Finland	25–20	25–19	25–27	25–18		100–84	Report

=== Pool D ===
Pos	Team	Pld	W	L	Pts	SW	SL	SR	SPW	SPL	SPR	Qualification
1	France	3	3	0	9	9	0	MAX	225	140	1.607	2018 European Championship
2	Latvia	3	2	1	6	6	5	1.200	257	250	1.028	Second round
3	Montenegro	3	1	2	2	4	8	0.500	259	289	0.896	
4	Slovenia	3	0	3	1	3	9	0.333	225	287	0.784	

Date	Time		Score		Set 1	Set 2	Set 3	Set 4	Set 5	Total	Report
27 Apr	18:00	Latvia	0–3	France	21–25	18–25	14–25			53–75	Report
27 Apr	20:30	Montenegro	3–2	Slovenia	27–25	25–27	25–21	19–25	15–13	111–111	Report
28 Apr	18:00	France	3–0	Slovenia	25–12	25–10	25–15			75–37	Report
28 Apr	20:30	Latvia	3–1	Montenegro	30–28	22–25	25–21	26–24		103–98	Report
29 Apr	18:00	Slovenia	1–3	Latvia	26–28	25–23	9–25	17–25		77–101	Report
29 Apr	20:30	France	3–0	Montenegro	25–12	25–18	25–20			75–50	Report

=== Pool E ===
Pos	Team	Pld	W	L	Pts	SW	SL	SR	SPW	SPL	SPR	Qualification
1	Germany	3	3	0	9	9	0	MAX	225	146	1.541	2018 European Championship
2	Romania	3	2	1	6	6	4	1.500	220	220	1.000	Second round
3	Sweden	3	1	2	2	4	8	0.500	245	275	0.891	
4	Austria	3	0	3	1	2	9	0.222	204	254	0.803	

Date	Time		Score		Set 1	Set 2	Set 3	Set 4	Set 5	Total	Report
26 Apr	15:00	Austria	0–3	Germany	18–25	10–25	20–25			48–75	Report
26 Apr	17:30	Romania	3–1	Sweden	25–23	22–25	25–21	25–23		97–92	Report
27 Apr	20:00	Sweden	3–2	Austria	25–20	22–25	25–20	17–25	15–13	104–103	Report
28 Apr	17:30	Germany	3–0	Sweden	25–16	25–21	25–12			75–49	Report
28 Apr	20:00	Romania	3–0	Austria	25–16	25–22	25–15			75–53	Report
29 Apr	20:00	Germany	3–0	Romania	25–15	25–23	25–11			75–49	Report

=== Pool F ===
Pos	Team	Pld	W	L	Pts	SW	SL	SR	SPW	SPL	SPR	Qualification
1	Portugal	2	2	0	6	6	1	6.000	169	149	1.134	2018 European Championship
2	Serbia	2	1	1	3	4	3	1.333	163	143	1.140	Second round
3	Norway	2	0	2	0	0	6	0.000	110	150	0.733	

Date	Time		Score		Set 1	Set 2	Set 3	Set 4	Set 5	Total	Report
26 Apr	20:00	Norway	0–3	Portugal	17–25	21–25	23–25			61–75	Report
27 Apr	20:00	Serbia	3–0	Norway	25–17	25–12	25–20			75–49	Report
28 Apr	20:00	Portugal	3–1	Serbia	25–22	25–12	13–25	31–29		94–88	Report

=== Pool G ===
Pos	Team	Pld	W	L	Pts	SW	SL	SR	SPW	SPL	SPR	Qualification
1	Turkey	2	2	0	5	6	2	3.000	193	167	1.156	2018 European Championship
2	Greece	2	1	1	3	3	4	0.750	157	165	0.952	Second round
3	Slovakia	2	0	2	1	3	6	0.500	194	212	0.915	

Date	Time		Score		Set 1	Set 2	Set 3	Set 4	Set 5	Total	Report
27 Apr	20:00	Greece	0–3	Turkey	19–25	15–25	26–28			60–78	Report
28 Apr	20:00	Slovakia	1–3	Greece	25–22	21–25	22–25	19–25		87–97	Report
29 Apr	17:30	Turkey	3–2	Slovakia	25–19	25–27	23–25	27–25	15–11	115–107	Report

=== Pool H ===
Pos	Team	Pld	W	L	Pts	SW	SL	SR	SPW	SPL	SPR	Qualification
1	Belarus	3	3	0	9	9	1	9.000	247	190	1.300	2018 European Championship
2	Poland	3	2	1	6	6	4	1.500	232	212	1.094	Second round
3	Ukraine	3	1	2	3	4	6	0.667	211	223	0.946	
4	Croatia	3	0	3	0	1	9	0.111	182	247	0.737	

Date	Time		Score		Set 1	Set 2	Set 3	Set 4	Set 5	Total	Report
27 Apr	16:00	Croatia	0–3	Ukraine	17–25	16–25	18–25			51–75	Report
27 Apr	19:00	Belarus	3–0	Poland	25–20	25–20	25–20			75–60	Report
28 Apr	16:00	Ukraine	1–3	Poland	25–22	17–25	23–25	23–25		88–97	Report
28 Apr	19:00	Croatia	1–3	Belarus	20–25	19–25	25–22	18–25		82–97	Report
29 Apr	16:00	Ukraine	0–3	Belarus	21–25	13–25	14–25			48–75	Report
29 Apr	19:00	Poland	3–0	Croatia	25–17	25–14	25–18			75–49	Report

== Second round ==
=== Pool I ===
Pos	Team	Pld	W	L	Pts	SW	SL	SR	SPW	SPL	SPR	Qualification
1	Poland	3	3	0	8	9	2	4.500	254	214	1.187	2018 European Championship
2	Spain	3	2	1	7	8	3	2.667	251	203	1.236	
3	Israel	3	1	2	3	3	7	0.429	201	234	0.859	
4	Latvia	3	0	3	0	1	9	0.111	186	241	0.772	

Date	Time		Score		Set 1	Set 2	Set 3	Set 4	Set 5	Total	Report
29 Jun	16:00	Latvia	0–3	Spain	14–25	15–25	20–25			49–75	Report
29 Jun	19:00	Poland	3–0	Israel	25–20	25–20	25–20			75–60	Report
30 Jun	16:00	Spain	3–0	Israel	25–14	25–20	25–16			75–50	Report
30 Jun	19:00	Latvia	0–3	Poland	14–25	19–25	20–25			53–75	Report
1 Jul	16:00	Israel	3–1	Latvia	25–20	16–25	25–17	25–22		91–84	Report
1 Jul	19:00	Spain	2–3	Poland	25–20	25–19	21–25	19–25	11–15	101–104	Report

=== Pool J ===
Pos	Team	Pld	W	L	Pts	SW	SL	SR	SPW	SPL	SPR	Qualification
1	Czech Republic	3	3	0	9	9	0	MAX	225	154	1.461	2018 European Championship
2	Greece	3	2	1	6	6	5	1.200	258	248	1.040	
3	Serbia	3	1	2	3	4	7	0.571	234	249	0.940	
4	Romania	3	0	3	0	2	9	0.222	204	270	0.756	

Date	Time		Score		Set 1	Set 2	Set 3	Set 4	Set 5	Total	Report
29 Jun	15:00	Romania	1–3	Serbia	19–25	25–20	15–25	16–25		75–95	Report
29 Jun	18:00	Czech Republic	3–0	Greece	25–15	25–22	25–22			75–59	Report
30 Jun	15:00	Serbia	1–3	Greece	23–25	25–22	18–25	25–27		91–99	Report
30 Jun	18:00	Romania	0–3	Czech Republic	17–25	17–25	13–25			47–75	Report
1 Jul	15:00	Greece	3–1	Romania	25–27	25–19	25–21	25–15		100–82	Report
1 Jul	18:00	Serbia	0–3	Czech Republic	12–25	19–25	17–25			48–75	Report
