= Finland men's national under-21 volleyball team =

National sports team

Finland U21
- Association: Finnish Volleyball Federation
- Confederation: CEV

Uniforms
| Home | Away | Third |

FIVB U21 World Championship
- Appearances: 1 (First in 1995)
- Best result: 4th place : (1995)

Europe U21 / U20 Championship
- Appearances: 10 (First in 1969)
- Best result: 7th place : (1994, 2022)
- www.lentopalloliitto.fi/en (in English)

The Finland men's national under-21 volleyball team represents Finland in international men's volleyball competitions and friendly matches under the age 21 and it is ruled by the Finnish Volleyball Federation body that is an affiliate of the Federation of International Volleyball FIVB and also part of the European Volleyball Confederation CEV.

== Results ==
=== FIVB U21 World Championship ===
Champions Runners up Third place Fourth place

FIVB U21 World Championship
| Year | Round | Position | Pld | W | L | SW | SL | Squad |
|---|---|---|---|---|---|---|---|---|
| (Brazil) 1977 | Didn't qualify | | | | | | | |
| (United States) 1981 | Didn't qualify | | | | | | | |
| (Italy) 1985 | Didn't qualify | | | | | | | |
| (Bahrain) 1987 | Didn't qualify | | | | | | | |
| (Greece) 1989 | Didn't qualify | | | | | | | |
| (Egypt) 1991 | Didn't qualify | | | | | | | |
| (Argentina) 1993 | Didn't qualify | | | | | | | |
| (Malaysia) 1995 | | 4th place | | | | | | |
| (Bahrain) 1997 | Didn't qualify | | | | | | | |
| (Thailand) 1999 | Didn't qualify | | | | | | | |
| (Poland) 2001 | Didn't qualify | | | | | | | |
| (Iran) 2003 | Didn't qualify | | | | | | | |
| (India) 2005 | Didn't qualify | | | | | | | |
| (Morocco) 2007 | Didn't qualify | | | | | | | |
| (India) 2009 | Didn't qualify | | | | | | | |
| (Brazil) 2011 | Didn't qualify | | | | | | | |
| (Turkey) 2013 | Didn't qualify | | | | | | | |
| (Mexico) 2015 | Didn't qualify | | | | | | | |
| (Czech Republic) 2017 | Didn't qualify | | | | | | | |
| (Bahrain) 2019 | Didn't qualify | | | | | | | |
| (Italy) (Bulgaria) 2021 | Didn't qualify | | | | | | | |
| (Bahrain) 2023 | Didn't qualify | | | | | | | |
| (China) 2025 | Didn't qualify | | | | | | | |
| Total | 0 Titles | 1/23 | | | | | | |

=== Junior European Volleyball Championship ===
- (Soviet Union) 1969: 14th
- (Netherlands) 1973: 19th
- (West Germany) 1982: 8th
- (West Germany) 1990: 9th
- (Turkey) 1994: 7th
- (Israel) 1996: 10th
- (Poland) / (Denmark) 2012: 11th
- (Netherlands) / (Belgium) 2018: 10th
- (Italy) 2022: 7th
- (Greece) / (Serbia) 2024: 11th
- (Croatia) / (Montenegro) 2027:

== Team ==
=== Current squad ===
The following players are the Finnish players that have competed in the 2018 Men's U20 Volleyball European Championship

| # | name | position | height | weight | birthday | spike | block |
| | breilin niklas | libero | 178 | 68 | 1999 | 317 | 300 |
| | hänninen tuomas | middle-blocker | 192 | 89 | 2001 | 333 | 310 |
| | heiskanen jere | outside-spiker | 192 | 72 | 2000 | 340 | 318 |
| | huhtakangas joonas | setter | 187 | 73 | 1999 | 328 | 310 |
| | ivanov fedor | setter | 193 | 78 | 2000 | 340 | 320 |
| | karjarinta mikko | middle-blocker | 210 | 98 | 1999 | 350 | 335 |
| | keskinen oskari | middle-blocker | 192 | 84 | 2000 | 342 | 320 |
| | kontio juuso | outside-spiker | 190 | 78 | 1999 | 337 | 320 |
| | köykkä voitto | libero | 179 | 70 | 1999 | 317 | 300 |
| | mäki eetu | middle-blocker | 193 | 75 | 2001 | 335 | 305 |
| | mäkinen jere | outside-spiker | 198 | 84 | 1999 | 342 | 322 |
| | nikula aaro | opposite | 212 | 95 | 1999 | 348 | 330 |
| | pöllänen aatu | middle-blocker | 192 | 88 | 1999 | 333 | 313 |
| | rahko väinö | outside-spiker | 198 | 83 | 2000 | 335 | 320 |
| | räsänen mikko | middle-blocker | 198 | 95 | 2000 | 345 | 325 |
| | rasinperä miro | libero | 186 | 76 | 1999 | 333 | 318 |
| | saarinen tomi | setter | 193 | 78 | 1999 | 335 | 320 |
| | savonsalmi severi | middle-blocker | 208 | 82 | 2000 | 340 | 320 |
| | sosunoff matias | outside-spiker | 202 | 89 | 2000 | 347 | 325 |
| | suihkonen niko | outside-spiker | 190 | 75 | 1999 | 340 | 320 |
| | tihumäki matias | opposite | 195 | 75 | 2001 | 335 | 310 |
| | tulonen joonas | opposite | 190 | 99 | 1999 | 332 | 315 |
| | väänänen joona | setter | 186 | 81 | 1999 | 329 | 320 |
| | välimaa anton | setter | 190 | 79 | 1999 | 320 | 305 |
| | välimaa santeri | setter | 187 | 85 | 2001 | 320 | 300 |
| | vanhanen lauri | libero | 185 | 78 | 2000 | 332 | 306 |
| | ylönen kimmo | middle-blocker | 195 | 78 | 2001 | 333 | 311 |
