= Slovakia men's national under-21 volleyball team =

Volleyball

Slovakia U21
- Association: Slovak Volleyball Federation
- Confederation: CEV

Uniforms
| Home | Away | Third |

FIVB U21 World Championship
- Appearances: 2 (First in 2001)
- Best result: 9th place : (2001, 2003)

Europe U21 / U20 Championship
- Appearances: 3 (First in 2002)
- Best result: 7th place : (2002)
- www.svf.sk (in Slovak)

The Slovakia men's national under-21 volleyball team represents Slovakia in international men's volleyball competitions and friendly matches under the age 21 and it is ruled by the Slovak Volleyball Federation body that is an affiliate of the Federation of International Volleyball FIVB and also part of the European Volleyball Confederation CEV.

== Results ==
=== FIVB U21 World Championship ===
Champions Runners up Third place Fourth place

FIVB U21 World Championship
| Year | Round | Position | Pld | W | L | SW | SL | Squad |
|---|---|---|---|---|---|---|---|---|
| (Brazil) 1977 | See Czechoslovakia | | | | | | | |
| (United States) 1981 | See Czechoslovakia | | | | | | | |
| (Italy) 1985 | See Czechoslovakia | | | | | | | |
| (Bahrain) 1987 | See Czechoslovakia | | | | | | | |
| (Greece) 1989 | See Czechoslovakia | | | | | | | |
| (Egypt) 1991 | See Czechoslovakia | | | | | | | |
| (Argentina) 1993 | See Czechoslovakia | | | | | | | |
| (Malaysia) 1995 | Didn't qualify | | | | | | | |
| (Bahrain) 1997 | Didn't qualify | | | | | | | |
| (Thailand) 1999 | Didn't qualify | | | | | | | |
| (Poland) 2001 | | 9th place | | | | | | |
| (Iran) 2003 | | 9th place | | | | | | |
| (India) 2005 | Didn't qualify | | | | | | | |
| (Morocco) 2007 | Didn't qualify | | | | | | | |
| (India) 2009 | Didn't qualify | | | | | | | |
| (Brazil) 2011 | Didn't qualify | | | | | | | |
| (Turkey) 2013 | Didn't qualify | | | | | | | |
| (Mexico) 2015 | Didn't qualify | | | | | | | |
| (Czech Republic) 2017 | Didn't qualify | | | | | | | |
| (Bahrain) 2019 | Didn't qualify | | | | | | | |
| (Italy) (Bulgaria) 2021 | Didn't qualify | | | | | | | |
| (Bahrain) 2023 | Didn't qualify | | | | | | | |
| (China) 2025 | Didn't qualify | | | | | | | |
| Total | 0 Titles | 2/23 | | | | | | |

== Team ==
=== Current squad ===
The following players are the Slovak players that have competed in the 2018 Men's U20 Volleyball European Championship

| # | name | position | height | weight | birthday | spike | block |
| 1 | jendrejcak jan | middle-blocker | 204 | 84 | 2000 | 345 | 316 |
| 2 | minda patrik | opposite | 200 | 82 | 1999 | 340 | 315 |
| 3 | remenar rastislav | outside-spiker | 196 | 80 | 2000 | 340 | 315 |
| 4 | vanco adrian | opposite | 196 | 86 | 2002 | 349 | 325 |
| 5 | panko samuel | libero | 172 | 60 | 2000 | 300 | 285 |
| 6 | pollak andrej | middle-blocker | 195 | 92 | 1999 | 335 | 307 |
| 7 | goc samuel | setter | 195 | 85 | 1999 | 348 | 330 |
| 8 | krisak martin | setter | 192 | 77 | 2002 | 339 | 305 |
| 9 | marinic milan | outside-spiker | 190 | 81 | 1999 | 340 | 313 |
| 10 | ondrus nicolas | outside-spiker | 188 | 83 | 1999 | 344 | 313 |
| 11 | bjelko samuel | outside-spiker | 191 | 82 | 1999 | 345 | 320 |
| 12 | kurej pavol | libero | 183 | 80 | 2000 | 321 | 297 |
| 13 | markovic sebastian | outside-spiker | 193 | 78 | 2000 | 330 | 308 |
| 14 | macuha filip | middle-blocker | 204 | 84 | 1999 | 341 | 325 |
| 15 | zeman michal | middle-blocker | 200 | 88 | 2001 | 345 | 330 |
| 16 | watzka erik | outside-spiker | 191 | 85 | 1999 | 345 | 320 |
| 17 | hrtus tomas | opposite | 188 | 67 | 1999 | 325 | 311 |
| 18 | rzyman simon | middle-blocker | 197 | 86 | 2001 | 344 | 310 |
| 19 | kudra martin | opposite | 188 | 87 | 1999 | 346 | 320 |
| 20 | fejt viliam | middle-blocker | 210 | 98 | 1999 | 340 | 320 |
| 21 | olearnik mario | setter | 184 | 75 | 2000 | 310 | 385 |
| 21 | porubsky samuel | setter | 182 | 66 | 2001 | 310 | 285 |
| 22 | martinak jakub | setter | 184 | 77 | 2001 | 320 | 295 |
