= Alessandro Bovolenta =

Italian volleyball player (born 2004)

Alessandro Alberto Bovolenta

Personal information
- Nationality: Italian
- Born: 27 May 2004 (age 22)
- Height: 202 cm (6 ft 8 in)

National team
Italy
Honours
Men's volleyball
Representing Italy
European Championship
Silver medal – second place	2023 Italy/Bulgaria/North Macedonia/Israel

Alessandro Alberto Bovolenta (born 27 May 2004) is an Italian volleyball player. He represented Italy at the 2024 Summer Olympics.
