= 2018 Men's U20 Volleyball European Championship =

Tournament details
- Host country: Netherlands; Belgium
- Dates: 14–22 July
- Teams: 12
- Venues: 2 (in 2 host cities)

Final positions
- Champions: Russia (19th title)

Tournament awards
- MVP: (Russia) Konstantin Abaev

The 2018 Men's Junior European Volleyball Championship took place in Netherlands and Belgium from 14 to 22 July 2018.

== Participating teams ==
- Hosts
  - Belgium
  - Netherlands
- Qualified through 2018 Men's U20 Volleyball European Championship Qualification
  - Belarus
  - Czech Republic
  - Finland
  - France
  - Germany
  - Italy
  - Poland
  - Portugal
  - Russia
  - Turkey

== Preliminary round ==
=== Pool I ===
Pos	Team	Pld	W	L	Pts	SW	SL	SR	SPW	SPL	SPR	Qualification
1	Czech Republic	5	4	1	12	14	6	2.333	459	430	1.067	Semifinals
2	Netherlands	5	3	2	9	11	9	1.222	449	440	1.020	Semifinals
3	Belarus	5	3	2	8	9	8	1.125	382	380	1.005	5th–8th Semifinals
4	Germany	5	3	2	8	11	10	1.100	454	421	1.078	5th–8th Semifinals
5	Finland	5	1	4	4	7	12	0.583	424	433	0.979	
6	Portugal	5	1	4	4	6	13	0.462	393	457	0.860	

Date	Time		Score		Set 1	Set 2	Set 3	Set 4	Set 5	Total	Report
14 Jul	14:00	Portugal	0–3	Germany	7–25	19–25	21–25			47–75	Report
14 Jul	16:30	Netherlands	0–3	Czech Republic	23–25	21–25	20–25			64–75	Report
14 Jul	19:00	Finland	3–0	Belarus	25–15	28–26	25–20			78–61	Report
15 Jul	14:00	Czech Republic	2–3	Germany	23–25	25–21	25–19	16–25	9–15	98–105	Report
15 Jul	16:30	Netherlands	3–0	Finland	30–28	25–20	25–19			80–67	Report
15 Jul	19:00	Belarus	3–0	Portugal	25–19	25–20	25–20			75–59	Report
16 Jul	14:00	Finland	1–3	Czech Republic	19–25	23–25	25–14	23–25		90–89	Report
16 Jul	16:30	Germany	0–3	Belarus	23–25	14–25	23–25			60–75	Report
16 Jul	19:00	Portugal	1–3	Netherlands	25–22	12–25	21–25	23–25		81–97	Report
18 Jul	14:00	Czech Republic	3–0	Belarus	25–18	25–19	25–20			75–57	Report
18 Jul	16:30	Finland	1–3	Portugal	22–25	25–17	19–25	22–25		88–92	Report
18 Jul	19:00	Netherlands	3–2	Germany	25–16	18–25	16–25	25–23	16–14	100–103	Report
19 Jul	14:00	Portugal	2–3	Czech Republic	18–25	27–25	30–28	22–25	17–19	114–122	Report
19 Jul	16:30	Germany	3–2	Finland	25–20	23–25	23–25	25–19	15–12	111–101	Report
19 Jul	19:00	Belarus	3–2	Netherlands	23–25	25–27	25–20	26–24	15–12	114–108	Report

=== Pool II ===
Pos	Team	Pld	W	L	Pts	SW	SL	SR	SPW	SPL	SPR	Qualification
1	Russia	5	4	1	11	14	9	1.556	511	471	1.085	Semifinals
2	Belgium	5	4	1	10	13	8	1.625	471	452	1.042	Semifinals
3	Italy	5	3	2	11	13	8	1.625	462	454	1.018	5th–8th Semifinals
4	Poland	5	3	2	8	10	10	1.000	460	441	1.043	5th–8th Semifinals
5	France	5	1	4	5	8	13	0.615	449	470	0.955	
6	Turkey	5	0	5	0	5	15	0.333	416	481	0.865	

Date	Time		Score		Set 1	Set 2	Set 3	Set 4	Set 5	Total	Report
14 Jul	15:00	Turkey	1–3	Russia	17–25	22–25	25–21	17–25		81–96	Report
14 Jul	17:30	Belgium	3–0	Poland	25–13	25–23	31–29			81–65	Report
14 Jul	20:00	Italy	3–0	France	28–26	25–18	26–24			79–68	Report
15 Jul	15:00	Russia	2–3	Poland	26–24	25–23	19–25	18–25	9–15	97–112	Report
15 Jul	17:30	France	2–3	Belgium	23–25	22–25	25–15	25–16	13–15	108–96	Report
15 Jul	20:00	Turkey	1–3	Italy	19–25	19–25	25–20	23–25		86–95	Report
16 Jul	15:00	Poland	3–1	France	25–17	24–26	25–17	25–22		99–82	Report
16 Jul	17:30	Italy	2–3	Russia	25–22	25–20	9–25	16–25	15–17	90–109	Report
16 Jul	20:00	Belgium	3–1	Turkey	25–20	23–25	25–17	25–20		98–82	Report
18 Jul	15:00	Russia	3–2	France	25–19	23–25	24–26	25–17	15–11	112–98	Report
18 Jul	17:30	Turkey	1–3	Poland	12–25	23–25	26–24	22–25		83–99	Report
18 Jul	20:00	Italy	2–3	Belgium	22–25	15–25	25–18	25–23	13–15	100–106	Report
19 Jul	14:00	France	3–1	Turkey	25–22	18–25	25–20	25–17		93–84	Report
19 Jul	16:30	Poland	1–3	Italy	24–26	25–22	18–25	18–25		85–98	Report
19 Jul	19:30	Belgium	1–3	Russia	20–25	22–25	25–22	23–25		90–97	Report

== 5th–8th classification ==
Semifinals
21 July
Belarus	1
Poland	3
21 July
Germany	3
Italy	2

5th place match
22 July
Poland	1
Germany	3
7th place match
22 July
Belarus	0
Italy	3

=== 5th–8th Semifinals ===
Date	Time		Score		Set 1	Set 2	Set 3	Set 4	Set 5	Total	Report
21 Jul	14:00	Belarus	1–3	Poland	27–29	28–26	21–25	18–25		94–105	Report
21 Jul	17:00	Germany	3–2	Italy	25–21	21–25	25–23	23–25	18–16	112–110	Report

=== 7th place match ===
Date	Time		Score		Set 1	Set 2	Set 3	Set 4	Set 5	Total	Report
22 Jul	11:00	Belarus	0–3	Italy	17–25	20–25	9–25			46–75	Report

=== 5th place match ===
Date	Time		Score		Set 1	Set 2	Set 3	Set 4	Set 5	Total	Report
22 Jul	13:30	Poland	1–3	Germany	25–21	23–25	22–25	16–25		86–96	Report

== Final round ==
Semifinals
21 July
Czech Republic	3
Belgium	1
21 July
Russia	3
Netherlands	1

Final
22 July
Czech Republic	2
Russia	3
3rd place match
22 July
Belgium	3
Netherlands	0

=== Semifinals ===
Date	Time		Score		Set 1	Set 2	Set 3	Set 4	Set 5	Total	Report
21 Jul	15:00	Czech Republic	3–1	Belgium	25–17	14–25	25–23	25–21		89–86	Report
21 Jul	18:00	Russia	3–1	Netherlands	25–23	20–25	25–12	25–22		95–82	Report

=== 3rd place match ===
Date	Time		Score		Set 1	Set 2	Set 3	Set 4	Set 5	Total	Report
22 Jul	16:00	Belgium	3–0	Netherlands	35–33	25–21	25–20			85–74	Report

=== Final ===
Date	Time		Score		Set 1	Set 2	Set 3	Set 4	Set 5	Total	Report
22 Jul	18:30	Czech Republic	2–3	Russia	25–18	13–25	25–21	18–25	16–18	97–107	Report

== Final standing ==
Rank	Team
1st place, gold medalist(s)	Russia
2nd place, silver medalist(s)	Czech Republic
3rd place, bronze medalist(s)	Belgium
4	Netherlands
5	Germany
6	Poland
7	Italy
8	Belarus
9	France
10	Finland
11	Portugal
12	Turkey

Qualified for the 2019 U21 World Championship

2018 Men's U20 European champions

Russia
19th title

12–man roster
Ivan Kuznetcov, Alexander Zakhvatenkov, Artem Melnikov, Konstantin Abaev, Egor Sidenko, Fannur Kayumov, Stanislav Antonov, Maxim Sapozhkov, Egor Krechetov, Denis Golubev, Anatoliy Volodin, Viktor Pivovarov
Head coach
Andrey Nozdrin

== Individual awards ==
- Most valuable player
  (Russia) Konstantin Abaev
- Best setter
  (Russia) Konstantin Abaev
- Best outside spikers
  (Belgium) Matthieu Vanneste
  (Netherlands) Bennie Tuinstra
- Best middle blockers
  (Netherlands) Sjors Tijhuis
  (Czech Republic) Josef Polak
- Best opposite spiker
  (Czech Republic) Marek Šotola
- Best libero
  (Belgium) Tim Verstraete

== See also ==
- 2018 Women's U19 Volleyball European Championship
