= England men's national volleyball team =

Men's national volleyball team representing England

England
- Association: Volleyball England
- Confederation: CEV

Uniforms
Home	Away
- www.volleyballengland.org

The England men's national volleyball team is the national team of England. It is governed by Volleyball England and takes part in international volleyball competitions.
