= Poland men's national under-21 volleyball team =

Poland U21
- Nickname(s): The White and Reds
- Association: Polski Związek Piłki Siatkowej
- Confederation: CEV

Uniforms
Home	Away
- Official website (in Polish)
Honours
Medal record
U21 World Championship
Gold medal – first place	1997 Bahrain
Gold medal – first place	2003 Iran
Gold medal – first place	2017 Czech Republic
Bronze medal – third place	2021 Italy/Bulgaria
U20 European Championship
Gold medal – first place	1996 Israel
Gold medal – first place	2016 Bulgaria
Silver medal – second place	1971 Spain
Silver medal – second place	2014 Czech Republic/Slovakia
Silver medal – second place	2022 Italy
Bronze medal – third place	1973 Netherlands
Bronze medal – third place	1975 West Germany

The Poland men's national under-21 volleyball team is controlled by the Polski Związek Piłki Siatkowej (PZPS), which represents the country in international competitions – U20 European Championships and U21 World Championship.

== History ==
First massive success Polish junior national team was achieved by players born mostly in 1977 and 1978. The junior national team led by coach Ireneusz Mazur achieved titles of 1996 Junior European Champion and 1997 Junior World Champion successively in the tournaments held in Israel and Bahrain. Among the players of this team were several players who later achieved notable careers and many medals in domestic and international tournaments like for example Paweł Zagumny, Krzysztof Ignaczak, Sebastian Świderski, Piotr Gruszka.

In 2003 Polish junior national team was crowned as the 2003 Junior World Champion. The national team born in 1983–85, led by Grzegorz Ryś, beat Brazil in the finale after tie break. It was a second title of Junior World Champions for Poland. Among the players was a few later senior European and (or) World Champions like Michał Winiarski, Mariusz Wlazły, Marcin Możdżonek, Michał Ruciak, Paweł Woicki, Marcel Gromadowski.

On September 10, 2016 Poland U21 achieved title of the 2016 CEV U20 European Champion after winning 7 of 7 matches in tournament and beating Ukraine U21 in the finale (3–1). On July 2, 2017 Poland U21 achieved title of U21 World Champion 2017 after beating Cuba U21 in the finale (3–0). The same squad of national team, led by coach Sebastian Pawlik, won 48 matches in the row and never lost (counted also under-19 tournaments). The squad roster, consisting mainly of players from the year 1997, has won all possible European and World championships under-19 and under-21.

== Statistics ==
=== U21 World Championship ===
Champions Runners up Third place

U21 World Championship record
Year	Round	Position	GP	MW	ML	SW	SL
(Brazil) 1977	Did not qualify						
(United States) 1981	Did not qualify						
(Italy) 1985	Did not qualify						
(Bahrain) 1987	Did not qualify						
(Greece) 1989		7th					
(Egypt) 1991	Did not qualify						
(Argentina) 1993	Did not qualify						
(Malaysia) 1995		8th					
(Bahrain) 1997	Final	1st					
(Thailand) 1999		9th					
(Poland) 2001	Playoffs	9th	4	2	2	10	8
(Iran) 2003	Final	1st	6	5	1	18	9
(India) 2005	Did not qualify						
(Morocco) 2007	Did not qualify						
(India) 2009	9th–12th places	9th	8	5	3	19	12
(Bahrain) 2011	Did not qualify						
(Turkey) 2013	Did not qualify						
(Mexico) 2015	9th–12th places	9th	8	6	2	19	11
(Czech Republic) 2017	Final	1st	8	8	0	24	6
(Bahrain) 2019	9th–12th places	11th	8	4	4	16	15
(Italy) (Bulgaria) 2021	Semifinals	3rd	8	6	2	16	11
(Bahrain) 2023	5th–8th places	5th	8	5	3	17	11
(China) 2025	5th–8th places	6th	9	6	3	21	10
Total	3 Titles	13/23					

=== U20 European Championship ===
Champions Runners up Third place

U20 European Championship record
Year	Round	Position	GP	MW	ML	SW	SL
(Hungary) 1966	Round Robin	10th					
(Soviet Union) 1969	Round Robin	7th					
(Spain) 1971	Round Robin	2nd					
(Netherlands) 1973	Round Robin	3rd					
(West Germany) 1975	Round Robin	3rd					
(France) 1977	Final Group	4th					
(Portugal) 1979	7th–12th places	8th					
(West Germany) 1982	Did not participate						
(France) 1984	7th–12th places	7th					
(Bulgaria) 1986	7th–12th places	8th					
(Italy) 1988	Semifinals	4th					
(West Germany) 1990	9th–12th places	10th					
(Poland) 1992	5th–8th places	7th					
(Turkey) 1994	Did not participate						
(Israel) 1996	Final	1st					
(Czech Republic) 1998	Semifinals	4th					
(Italy) 2000	5th–8th places	5th					
(Poland) 2002	5th–8th places	5th					
(Croatia) 2004	Did not participate						
(Russia) 2006	5th–8th places	7th					
(Czech Republic) 2008	Preliminary Round	9th					
(Belarus) 2010	Preliminary Round	10th					
(Poland) (Denmark) 2012	5th–8th places	6th					
(Czech Republic) (Slovakia) 2014	Final	2nd					
(Bulgaria) 2016	Final	1st					
(Netherlands) (Belgium) 2018	5th–8th places	6th					
(Czech Republic) 2020	5th–8th places	7th					
(Italy) 2022	Final	2nd					
(Greece) (Serbia) 2024	Group stage	8th					
Total	2 Titles	26/29					

== See also ==
- Poland men's national U19 volleyball team
- Poland men's national U23 volleyball team
- Poland men's national volleyball team
