= Bulgaria men's national under-21 volleyball team =

Youth volleyball team representing Bulgaria

Bulgaria U21
- Association: Bulgarian Volleyball Federation
- Confederation: CEV

Uniforms
Home	Away	Third

FIVB U21 World Championship
- Appearances: 11 (First in 1985)
- Best result: (gold) Champions : (1991)

Europe U21 / U20 Championship
- Appearances: Data uncompleted
- Best result: (gold) Champions : (1986)
- www.volleyball.bg (in Bulgarian)
Honours
Medal record
U21 World Championship
Gold medal – first place	1991 Egypt
Bronze medal – third place	2003 Iran
Bronze medal – third place	2023 Bahrain

The Bulgaria men's national under-21 volleyball team represents Bulgaria in international men's volleyball competitions and friendly matches under the age 21 and it is ruled by the Bulgarian Volleyball Federation body that is an affiliate of the Federation of International Volleyball FIVB and also part of the European Volleyball Confederation CEV.

== Results ==
=== FIVB U21 World Championship ===
Champions Runners up Third place Fourth place

FIVB U21 World Championship
Year	Round	Position	Pld	W	L	SW	SL	Squad
(Brazil) 1977	Didn't qualify							
(United States) 1981	Didn't qualify							
(Italy) 1985		5th place						
(Bahrain) 1987		5th place						
(Greece) 1989		4th place						
(Egypt) 1991		Champions						
(Argentina) 1993		9th place						
(Malaysia) 1995	Didn't qualify							
(Bahrain) 1997	Didn't qualify							
(Thailand) 1999	Didn't qualify							
(Poland) 2001	Didn't qualify							
(Iran) 2003		Third place						
(India) 2005	Didn't qualify							
(Morocco) 2007		6th place						
(India) 2009	Didn't qualify							
(Brazil) 2011		13th place						
(Turkey) 2013	Didn't qualify							
(Mexico) 2015	Didn't qualify							
(Czech Republic) 2017	Didn't qualify							
(Bahrain) 2019	Didn't qualify							
(Italy) (Bulgaria) 2021		6th place						
(Bahrain) 2023		Third place	8	6	2	20	10	
(China) 2025		10th place	9	4	5	15	20	
Total	1 Title	11/23						

== Team ==
=== Current squad ===
The following players are the Bulgarian players that have competed in the 2018 Men's U20 Volleyball European Championship

#	name	position	height	weight	birthday	spike	block
	asparuhov asparuh	outside-spiker	200	87	2000	345	325
	blaginov valentin	middle-blocker	200	88	2000	326	305
	dimitrov dimitar	opposite	202	87	2000	335	330
	dimitrov hristiyan	opposite	200	82	1999	347	325
	dimitrov stoyan	middle-blocker	201	91	1999	345	320
	dimov dimo	setter	195	84	1999	335	320
	dobrev simeon	libero	175	65	2001	305	295
	georgiev valeri	libero	185	65	2000	315	295
	ivanov svetoslav	outside-spiker	194	76	2000	330	320
	karyagin denis	opposite	202	84	2002	325	305
	krastev deivid	opposite	198	78	1999	335	320
	marinov georgi	setter	180	73	2000	310	280
	minkov daniel	setter	193	80	1999	320	305
	nechev konstantin	setter	194	81	1999	335	325
	nikolov aleks	middle-blocker	195	85	1999	348	330
	pankov ivan	opposite	196	85	2000	330	320
	petrov georgi	outside-spiker	196	85	1999	330	320
	petrov petar	outside-spiker	191	67	2001	330	306
	slavchov alberto	middle-blocker	200	89	1999	340	325
	smatrakalev radoslav	middle-blocker	201	85	1999	330	320
	stoichkov ivan	outside-spiker	196	81	1999	335	318
	stoyanov mario	libero	184	74	1999	315	300
	telkiyski lyuboslav	setter	197	73	2001	320	311
	topuzliev simeon	outside-spiker	192	77	2000	330	310
	uzunov stefan	setter	185	82	2000	320	315
	valchinov samuil	outside-spiker	194	77	2001	324	306
	vasilev dobrin	opposite	198	81	1999	335	325
	yordanov teodor	middle-blocker	197	69	2002	325	305
	zahariev nikolay	middle-blocker	203	75	2001	335	315

== See also ==
- Bulgaria men's team
- Bulgaria men's U19 team
- Bulgaria men's U21 team
- Bulgaria men's U23 team
- Bulgaria women's team
