= Slovenia men's national under-21 volleyball team =

Volleyball team

Slovenia U21
- Association: Slovenian Volleyball Federation
- Confederation: CEV

Uniforms
Home	Away	Third

FIVB U21 World Championship
- Appearances: 2 (First in 2007)
- Best result: 7th place : (2015)

Europe U21 / U20 Championship
- Appearances: Data uncompleted
- www.odbojka.si (in Slovene)

The Slovenia men's national under-21 volleyball team represents Slovenia in international men's volleyball competitions and friendly matches under the age 21 and it is ruled by the Slovenian Volleyball Federation body that is an affiliate of the Federation of International Volleyball FIVB and also part of the European Volleyball Confederation CEV.

== Results ==
=== FIVB U21 World Championship ===
Champions Runners up Third place Fourth place

FIVB U21 World Championship
Year	Round	Position	Pld	W	L	SW	SL	Squad
(Brazil) 1977	See Yugoslavia							
(United States) 1981	See Yugoslavia							
(Italy) 1985	See Yugoslavia							
(Bahrain) 1987	See Yugoslavia							
(Greece) 1989	See Yugoslavia							
(Egypt) 1991	See Yugoslavia							
(Argentina) 1993	Didn't Qualify							
(Malaysia) 1995	Didn't Qualify							
(Bahrain) 1997	Didn't Qualify							
(Thailand) 1999	Didn't Qualify							
(Poland) 2001	Didn't Qualify							
(Iran) 2003	Didn't Qualify							
(India) 2005	Didn't Qualify							
(Morocco) 2007		9th place						Squad
(India) 2009	Didn't Qualify							
(Brazil) 2011	Didn't Qualify							
(Turkey) 2013	Didn't Qualify							
(Mexico) 2015		7th place						Squad
(Czech Republic) 2017	Didn't Qualify							
(Bahrain) 2019	Didn't Qualify							
(Italy) (Bulgaria) 2021	Didn't Qualify							
(Bahrain) 2023	Didn't Qualify							
(China) 2025	Didn't Qualify							
Total	0 Titles	2/23						

== Team ==
=== Previous squad ===
#	name	position	height	weight	birthday	spike	block
1	PUŠNIK Tilen	Opposite	194	74	2000	332	310
2	BORIN Anže	Libero	181	72	1999	305	292
2	PERNUŠ Gregor	Setter	193	84	1999	320	305
3	VALENCIC Martin	Opposite	201	90	1999	336	314
4	KODRIC Erik	Middle blocker	196	96	1999	330	310
5	ROTAR Bor Jese	Outside spiker	188	85	1999	325	305
6	MORI Žiga	Setter	192	75	2000	326	306
7	RANC David	Outside spiker	194	88	1999	333	306
8	PODOBNIK Teo	Outside spiker	193	86	1999	330	306
9	KUMER Žiga	Outside spiker	184	73	1999	325	303
10	GLINŠEK Kaj	Middle blocker	195	85	2002	329	305
10	HRIBERNIK Gregor	Middle blocker	204	94	1999	334	308
11	PUŠNIK Matevž	Middle blocker	194	81	1999	331	305
12	ROJNIK Matic	Outside spiker	198	99	2000	335	306
14	KAVCIC Jakob	Middle blocker	195	93	1999	329	305
15	MOŽIC Rok	Outside spiker	191	76	2002	335	306
16	KAFOL Aljoša	Setter	189	79	2000	320	303
18	BOŠNJAK Crtomir	Outside spiker	195	85	2000	340	309
20	FORŠTNARIC Rok	Setter	198	86	1999	330	306
	RUTAR Filip	Middle blocker	201	87	1999	330	313
