= Belgium men's national under-21 volleyball team =

Belgium U21
- Association: Belgium Volleyball Federation
- Confederation: CEV

Uniforms
Home	Away	Third

FIVB U21 World Championship
- Appearances: 3 (First in 2009)
- Best result: 6th place : (2009)

Europe U21 / U20 Championship
- Appearances: Data uncompleted
- Official KBVBV website (in Dutch)

The Belgium men's national under-21 volleyball team represents Belgium in international men's volleyball competitions and friendly matches under the age 21 and it is ruled by the Royal Belgium Volleyball Federation body that is an affiliate of the Federation of International Volleyball FIVB and also part of the European Volleyball Confederation CEV.

== Results ==
=== FIVB U21 World Championship ===
Champions Runners up Third place Fourth place

FIVB U21 World Championship
Year	Round	Position	Pld	W	L	SW	SL	Squad
(Brazil) 1977	Didn't qualify							
(United States) 1981	Didn't qualify							
(Italy) 1985	Didn't qualify							
(Bahrain) 1987	Didn't qualify							
(Greece) 1989	Didn't qualify							
(Egypt) 1991	Didn't qualify							
(Argentina) 1993	Didn't qualify							
(Malaysia) 1995	Didn't qualify							
(Bahrain) 1997	Didn't qualify							
(Thailand) 1999	Didn't qualify							
(Poland) 2001	Didn't qualify							
(Iran) 2003	Didn't qualify							
(India) 2005	Didn't qualify							
(Morocco) 2007	Didn't qualify							
(India) 2009		6th place						
(Brazil) 2011		9th place						
(Turkey) 2013	Didn't qualify							
(Mexico) 2015	Didn't qualify							
(Czech Republic) 2017	Didn't qualify							
(Bahrain) 2019	Didn't qualify							
(Italy) (Bulgaria) 2021		5th place						
(Bahrain) 2023		7th place						
(China) 2025	Didn't qualify							
Total	0 Titles	4/23						

== Team ==
=== Current squad ===
The following players are the Belgian players that have competed in the 2018 Men's U20 Volleyball European Championship

#	name	position	height	weight	birthday	spike	block
	Bossée Kevin	libero	183	79	2000	329	300
	Brems Kobe	setter	191	89	2000	322	302
	d'Heer Wout	opposite	202	80	2001	345	320
	Debaus Michiel	middle-blocker	197	80	1999	340	318
	Desmet Mathijs	outside-spiker	196	89	2000	341	315
	Evrard Clément	setter	183	87	1999	319	297
	Fischer Hugo	middle-blocker	203	85	1999	335	307
	Foret Robin	outside-spiker	191	76	1999	324	298
	Lallemand Martin	opposite	194	84	2000	332	310
	Lepever Pedro	middle-blocker	199	85	2000	342	318
	Louwette Jochen	middle-blocker	196	84	1999	340	320
	Maes Arthur	setter	189	86	2000	323	297
	Peeters Joost	outside-spiker	187	89	2001	326	290
	Peters Berre	outside-spiker	190	89	2000	349	320
	Plaskie Simon	outside-spiker	190	77	2001	335	310
	Rotty Seppe	outside-spiker	188	76	2001	338	306
	van Elsen Lennert	middle-blocker	198	73	2001	338	312
	van Hoyweghen Seppe	setter	196	81	2000	339	303
	van Lommel Dries	middle-blocker	192	90	2000	330	304
	Vandamme Jome	opposite	194	83	1999	339	308
	Vanneste Mathieu	outside-spiker	196	81	1999	337	309
	Verstraete Tim	libero	174	72	1999	317	293
