= France men's national under-21 volleyball team =

Youth volleyball team representing France

France U21
- Association: French Volleyball Federation
- Confederation: CEV
- Head coach: Slimane Belmadi

Uniforms
Home	Away	Third

FIVB U21 World Championship
- Appearances: 7 (First in 1985)
- Best result: (silver) (1999)

European U21 / U20 Championship
- Appearances: Data uncompleted
- Best result: (gold) (2008, 2024)
- French Volleyball Federation (in French)

The France men's national under-21 volleyball team represents France in international men's volleyball competitions and friendly matches under the age 21 and it is ruled by the French Volleyball Federation body that is an affiliate of the Federation of International Volleyball FIVB and also part of the European Volleyball Confederation CEV.

== Results ==
=== FIVB U21 World Championship ===
Champions Runners up Third place Fourth place

FIVB U21 World Championship
Year	Round	Position	Pld	W	L	SW	SL	Squad
(Brazil) 1977	Did not qualify							
(United States) 1981	Did not qualify							
(Italy) 1985		9th place						
(Bahrain) 1987	Did not qualify							
(Greece) 1989	Did not qualify							
(Egypt) 1991	Did not qualify							
(Argentina) 1993	Did not qualify							
(Malaysia) 1995	Did not qualify							
(Bahrain) 1997	Did not qualify							
(Thailand) 1999	Final	Runners-up						
(Poland) 2001		7th place						
(Iran) 2003	Did not qualify							
(India) 2005	Did not qualify							
(Morocco) 2007	Did not qualify							
(India) 2009	9th place match	10th place	8	5	3	19	12	Squad
(Brazil) 2011	Did not qualify							
(Turkey) 2013	Semifinals	4th place	8	5	3	17	13	Squad
(Mexico) 2015	9th place match	10th place	8	4	4	15	15	Squad
(Czech Republic) 2017	Did not qualify							
(Bahrain) 2019	Did not qualify							
(Italy) (Bulgaria) 2021	Did not qualify							
(Bahrain) 2023	Did not qualify							
(China) 2025	5th place match	5th place	9	7	2	24	9	Squad
Total	0 Titles	7/23						

== Team ==
=== Current squad ===
The following players are the French players that have competed in the 2018 Men's U20 Volleyball European Championship

#	name	position	height	weight	birthday	spike	block
1	Labazhevich Roman	middle-blocker	202	86	1999	347	324
2	Soldner Lucas	setter	188	73	1999	327	308
3	Gill Thomas	setter	197	84	2000	343	320
4	Rebeyrol François	outside-spiker	200	85	1999	351	326
5	Toledo Pierre	middle-blocker	196	80	2000	349	322
6	Ncois Kevin	outside-spiker	189	80	1999	336	316
7	Cardin Célestin	opposite	196	81	1999	339	320
8	Derouillon Pierre	outside-spiker	196	83	1999	345	316
9	Laumon Maxime	opposite	194	86	2000	334	317
10	Poda Danny	outside-spiker	194	90	1999	330	315
11	Faure Théo	outside-spiker	202	93	1999	340	325
12	Ramon Luca	libero	188	70	2000	329	308
13	Jeanlys Samuel	opposite	202	84	1999	354	336
14	Bassereau Remi	outside-spiker	195	82	1999	356	339
15	Roatta Maxime	middle-blocker	202	98	1999	346	323
16	Huetz Francois	outside-spiker	200	93	2000	335	319
17	Agesilas Boris	middle-blocker	198	85	1999	269	264
22	Gempin Grégory	opposite	199	80	2001	336	318
	Annicette Wyllan	outside-spiker	190	78	2000	345	323
	Dukic Marin	outside-spiker	192	85	2000	332	313
	Garcia Matthieu	setter	185	72	2000	325	288
	Helfer Thomas	setter	190	67	2001	322	306
	Motta Paes Kellian	setter	184	62	2002	315	300
	Pineau Louis	libero	185	76	2000	325	310
	Roehrig Simon	middle-blocker	198	95	2000	331	314
	Sangare Pablo	middle-blocker	203	90	2001	344	324
	Socrier Lenny	middle-blocker	200	100	1999	345	318
