= Switzerland men's national under-21 volleyball team =

Under-21 volleyball team

Switzerland U21
- Association: Swiss Volleyball Federation
- Confederation: CEV

Uniforms
Home	Away	Third

FIVB U21 World Championship
- Appearances: No Appearances

Europe U21 / U20 Championship
- Appearances: Data uncompleted
- volleyball.ch (in German)

The Switzerland men's national under-21 volleyball team represents Switzerland in international men's volleyball competitions and friendly matches under the age 21 and it is ruled by the Swiss Volleyball Federation body that is an affiliate of the Federation of International Volleyball FIVB and also part of the European Volleyball Confederation CEV.

== Results ==
=== FIVB U21 World Championship ===
Champions Runners up Third place Fourth place

FIVB U21 World Championship
Year	Round	Position	Pld	W	L	SW	SL	Squad
(Brazil) 1977	Didn't qualify							
(United States) 1981	Didn't qualify							
(Italy) 1985	Didn't qualify							
(Bahrain) 1987	Didn't qualify							
(Greece) 1989	Didn't qualify							
(Egypt) 1991	Didn't qualify							
(Argentina) 1993	Didn't qualify							
(Malaysia) 1995	Didn't qualify							
(Bahrain) 1997	Didn't qualify							
(Thailand) 1999	Didn't qualify							
(Poland) 2001	Didn't qualify							
(Iran) 2003	Didn't qualify							
(India) 2005	Didn't qualify							
(Morocco) 2007	Didn't qualify							
(India) 2009	Didn't qualify							
(Brazil) 2011	Didn't qualify							
(Turkey) 2013	Didn't qualify							
(Mexico) 2015	Didn't qualify							
(Czech Republic) 2017	Didn't qualify							
(Bahrain) 2019	Didn't qualify							
(Italy) (Bulgaria) 2021	Didn't qualify							
(Bahrain) 2023	Didn't qualify							
(China) 2025	Didn't qualify							
Total	0 Titles	0/23						

== Team ==
=== Previous squad ===
#	name	position	height	weight	birthday	spike	block
1	VON AH Jonas	Outside spiker	188	73	2001	318	305
2	MARGOT Simon	Middle blocker	199	85	2001	336	320
3	CHARPILLOZ Yves	Setter	179	67	2001	320	305
3	HASLER Lukas	Libero	175	68	2002	308	295
4	CONCONI Silvano	Outside spiker	185	72	2001	328	315
5	CADUFF Nino	Opposite	188	89	2002	334	320
6	COLOMB Thibaud	Outside spiker	196	89	2002	328	315
7	SCHMID Roy	Middle blocker	194	88	2002	322	304
8	MAAG Simon	Middle blocker	197	79	2001	328	315
9	MOSER Tobias	Setter	187	72	2001	324	310
10	MLADENOVIC Darko	Outside spiker	190	91	2001	316	300
11	HELLER Eric	Middle blocker	200	85	2001	335	320
12	LENGWEILER Alexander	Opposite	197	85	2001	340	325
13	SÜTTERLIN Flavio	Outside spiker	200	84	2001	334	320
14	BORRELLO Luca	Middle blocker	189	86	2002	318	300
15	GLASER Manuel	Middle blocker	195	88	2001	330	315
16	INEICHEN Tim	Libero	180	70	2001	308	290
17	URWYLER Moritz	Outside spiker	189	82	2001	326	308
18	SCHNEGG Tinko	Outside spiker	186	68	2001	318	305
19	EGGER Fabrice	Setter	196	72	2001	340	320
20	STUDER Benjamin	Libero	183	72	2001	312	298
21	KOLB Cyril	Outside spiker	188	75	2003	320	305
22	DIEM Ramon	Libero	175	75	2002	312	305
