= Romania men's national under-21 volleyball team =

Romania U21
- Association: Romanian Volleyball Federation
- Confederation: CEV

Uniforms
Home	Away	Third

FIVB U21 World Championship
- Appearances: No Appearances

Europe U21 / U20 Championship
- Appearances: Data uncompleted
- Official website

The Romania men's national under-21 volleyball team represents Romania in international men's volleyball competitions and friendly matches under the age 21 and it is ruled by the Romanian Volleyball Federation body that is an affiliate of the Federation of International Volleyball FIVB and also part of the European Volleyball Confederation CEV.

== Results ==
=== FIVB U21 World Championship ===
Champions Runners up Third place Fourth place

FIVB U21 World Championship
Year	Round	Position	Pld	W	L	SW	SL	Squad
(Brazil) 1977	Didn't qualify							
(United States) 1981	Didn't qualify							
(Italy) 1985	Didn't qualify							
(Bahrain) 1987	Didn't qualify							
(Greece) 1989	Didn't qualify							
(Egypt) 1991	Didn't qualify							
(Argentina) 1993	Didn't qualify							
(Malaysia) 1995	Didn't qualify							
(Bahrain) 1997	Didn't qualify							
(Thailand) 1999	Didn't qualify							
(Poland) 2001	Didn't qualify							
(Iran) 2003	Didn't qualify							
(India) 2005	Didn't qualify							
(Morocco) 2007	Didn't qualify							
(India) 2009	Didn't qualify							
(Brazil) 2011	Didn't qualify							
(Turkey) 2013	Didn't qualify							
(Mexico) 2015	Didn't qualify							
(Czech Republic) 2017	Didn't qualify							
(Bahrain) 2019	Didn't qualify							
(Italy) (Bulgaria) 2021	Didn't qualify							
(Bahrain) 2023	Didn't qualify							
(China) 2025	Didn't qualify							
Total	0 Titles	0/23						

== Team ==
=== Current squad ===
The following players are the Romanian players that have competed in the 2018 Men's U20 Volleyball European Championship

#	name	position	height	weight	birthday	spike	block
	abrudan paul	outside-spiker	193	80	2000	330	320
	ana andrei octavian	opposite	202	70	1999	340	325
	badea cristian	outside-spiker	196	76	2001	335	320
	bartha bela florian	middle-blocker	201	86	2000	338	330
	baziliuc-iordache razvan iulian	outside-spiker	190	78	2000	320	315
	bratu sebastian gabriel	setter	190	75	2000	310	290
	calin robert	middle-blocker	200	71	2000	338	330
	chesim adrian	opposite	193	77	1999	339	315
	chicu laurentiu	setter	188	70	2001	310	295
	cojocariu madalin florin	opposite	189	77	2002	325	320
	cozma sebastian	setter	192	80	2001	322	309
	curuia-pop vlad cristian	outside-spiker	188	72	1999	327	304
	darlaczi ovidiu costin	outside-spiker	200	77	1999	335	310
	dragan emanuel cristian	middle-blocker	197	84	2001	335	315
	dragomir alexandru	setter	193	78	1999	310	280
	druta andrei bogdan	opposite	192	73	2002	315	300
	ferencz dan alexandru	outside-spiker	194	76	2000	335	312
	grigoras silviu	setter	196	80	1999	330	310
	grigorie nicolas valentin	outside-spiker	194	70	1999	330	304
	holota adrian	opposite	193	75	2001	330	325
	micu sebastian	middle-blocker	195	87	1999	330	315
	moldovan antonio horatiu	libero	180	70	2000	300	285
	monga gabriel	setter	183	60	2000	315	286
	nicolae ionut victor	libero	180	77	2000	312	290
	paun marian cristian	outside-spiker	190	78	2000	335	320
	pop catalin ionut	opposite	195	80	2000	335	320
	pop radu	opposite	197	78	1999	324	305
	purcaru eduard stefan	setter	185	68	2001	310	295
	rata alexandru	opposite	193	68	2000	334	315
	talpa mihnea	outside-spiker	190	80	2000	325	320
	tudor andrei claudiu	libero	185	75	1999	310	304
	versenyi levente	middle-blocker	196	72	1999	326	316
