= Germany men's national under-21 volleyball team =

Germany U21
- Association: German Volleyball Federation
- Confederation: CEV

Uniforms
Home	Away

FIVB U21 World Championship
- Appearances: 8 (First in 1981)
- Best result: 4th place (1987)

Europe U21 / U20 Championship
- Appearances: 24 (First in 1966)
- Best result: (silver) Runners-up (1982, 2008)
- www.volleyball-verband.de (in German)

The Germany men's national under-21 volleyball team represents Germany in international men's volleyball competitions and friendly matches under the age 21 and it is governed by the German Volleyball Association body that is an affiliate of the Federation of International Volleyball FIVB and also part of the European Volleyball Confederation CEV.

== Results ==
For East Germany team record, look here.

=== FIVB U21 World Championship ===
Champions Runners-up Third place Fourth place

FIVB U21 World Championship
Year	Round	Position	Pld	W	L	SW	SL	Squad
as West Germany
(Brazil) 1977	Didn't qualify							
(United States) 1981		8th place						Squad
(Italy) 1985	Didn't qualify							
(Bahrain) 1987		4th place						Squad
(Greece) 1989	Didn't qualify							
as Germany
(Egypt) 1991		13th place						Squad
(Argentina) 1993		13th place						Squad
(Malaysia) 1995	Didn't qualify							
(Bahrain) 1997		5th place						Squad
(Thailand) 1999	Didn't qualify							
(Poland) 2001	Didn't qualify							
(Iran) 2003		8th place						Squad
(India) 2005		9th place						Squad
(Morocco) 2007	Didn't qualify							
(India) 2009	Didn't qualify							
(Brazil) 2011		10th place						Squad
(Turkey) 2013	Didn't qualify							
(Mexico) 2015	Didn't qualify							
(Czech Republic) 2017	Didn't qualify							
(Bahrain) 2019	Didn't qualify							
(Italy) (Bulgaria) 2021	Didn't qualify							
(Bahrain) 2023	Didn't qualify							
(China) 2025	Didn't qualify							
Total	0 Titles	8/23						

=== Europe U21 / 20 Championship ===
Champions Runners-up Third place Fourth place

Europe U21 / 20 Championship
Year	Round	Position	Pld	W	L	SW	SL	Squad
as West Germany
(Hungary) 1966		14th place						Squad
(Soviet Union) 1969		13th place						Squad
(Spain) 1971		10th place						Squad
(Netherlands) 1973		15th place						Squad
(West Germany) 1975		12th place						Squad
(France) 1977		6th place						Squad
(Portugal) 1979	Didn't qualify							
(West Germany) 1982		Runners-up						Squad
(France) 1984		8th place						Squad
(Hungary) 1986		Third place						Squad
(Italy) 1988		11th place						Squad
(West Germany) 1990		Third place						Squad

Europe U21 / 20 Championship
Year	Round	Position	Pld	W	L	SW	SL	Squad
as Germany
(Poland) 1992		6th place						Squad
(Turkey) 1994	Didn't qualify							
(Israel) 1996	Didn't qualify							
(Czech Republic) 1998		8th place						Squad
(Italy) 2000		9th place						Squad
(Poland) 2002		Third place						Squad
(Croatia) 2004		Third place						Squad
(Russia) 2006		9th place						Squad
(Czech Republic) 2008		Runners-up						Squad
(Belarus) 2010		6th place						Squad
(Denmark) / (Poland) 2012		8th place						Squad
(Czech Republic) / (Slovakia) 2014		13th place						Squad
(Bulgaria) 2016		6th place						Squad
(Netherlands) / (Belgium) 2018		5th place						Squad
(Czech Republic) 2020		8th place						Squad
(Italy) 2022	Didn't qualify							
Total	0 Titles	24/28						

== Team ==
=== Current squad ===
The following players are the German players that have competed in the 2018 Men's U20 Volleyball European Championship

#	name	position	height	weight	birthday	spike	block
1	weber linus	opposite	200	89	1999	335	316
2	burggräf eric	setter	183	82	1999	330	319
3	sagstetter benedikt	setter	194	81	2000	328	318
4	frank anton	middle-blocker	204	88	2000	342	330
5	thole konrad	outside-spiker	205	81	1999	322	307
6	niederlücke erik	outside-spiker	204	86	1999	326	311
7	werner robert	outside-spiker	190	83	1999	328	312
8	karlitzek lorenz	outside-spiker	194	84	1999	345	331
9	kunstmann louis	middle-blocker	198	85	2000	339	327
10	röling jan	setter	185	82	1999	330	316
11	batanov ivan	libero	182	78	2000	325	306
12	brehme anton	middle-blocker	199	90	1999	340	329
13	sagstetter jonas	libero	189	83	1999	329	308
14	daniluk cordian	setter	188	82	2000	311	299
15	pfretzschner lukas	outside-spiker	190	85	2000	329	312
16	dierks luca	middle-blocker	200	89	1999	323	308
17	meissner julian	outside-spiker	200	90	1999	340	329
18	pfretzschner simon	outside-spiker	189	78	2002	316	304
19	röhrs erik	outside-spiker	194	82	2001	319	310
20	rehmeier nils	middle-blocker	202	87	2000	340	325
21	torwie simon valentin	opposite	203	93	2001	321	311
22	botho paul	opposite	208	100	1999	315	305
	brehme louis	outside-spiker	181	75	1999	305	295
	eckardt moritz	libero	183	70	2001	295	280
	hoyer julian	outside-spiker	192	79	2001	310	301
	schwarmann ole	setter	183	72	1999	305	295

fix table
