= Norway men's national under-21 volleyball team =

Under-21 volleyball team

Norway U21
- Association: Norwegian Volleyball Federation
- Confederation: CEV

Uniforms
| Home | Away | Third |

FIVB U21 World Championship
- Appearances: No Appearances

Europe U21 / U20 Championship
- Appearances: Data uncompleted

The Norway men's national under-21 volleyball team represents Norway in international men's volleyball competitions and friendly matches under the age 21 and it is ruled by the Norwegian Volleyball Federation body that is an affiliate of the Federation of International Volleyball FIVB and also part of the European Volleyball Confederation CEV.

== Results ==
=== FIVB U21 World Championship ===
Champions Runners up Third place Fourth place

FIVB U21 World Championship
| Year | Round | Position | Pld | W | L | SW | SL | Squad |
|---|---|---|---|---|---|---|---|---|
| (Brazil) 1977 To | (China) 2025 | Didn't qualify | | | | | | | |
| Total | 0 Titles | 0/23 | | | | | | |

=== European U21 / 20 Championship ===
Champions Runners-up Third place 4th place

European U21 / 20 Championship Qualifying Tournament
| Year | Round | Position | Pld | W | L | SW | SL | Squad |
|---|---|---|---|---|---|---|---|---|
| 2014 | Second round | 7th place | | | | | | |
| 2016 | Second round | Third place | | | | | | |
| 2018 | First round | Third place | | | | | | |
| 2020 | | | | | | | | |
| Total | 0 Titles | 0/27 | | | | | | |

== Team ==
=== Previous squad ===
The Following Players Represents Norway in the 2022 European Junior Championship Qualifications

| # | name | position | height | weight | birthday | spike | block |
| 1 | UTVIK Benjamin | Libero | 183 | 70 | 2003 | 325 | 242 |
| 2 | MORTEN Espen Kalvatn | Setter | 185 | 70 | 2003 | 332 | 237 |
| 3 | Gundersen Oscar Majak | Outside spiker | 195 | 70 | 2004 | 345 | 249 |
| 4 | FØRLAND Christoffer | Setter | 180 | 70 | 2003 | 319 | 232 |
| 5 | HOLMEFJORD Eirik Hæve | Middle blocker | 193 | 70 | 2004 | 327 | 254 |
| 6 | LID Sean | Libero | 179 | 70 | 2003 | 303 | 230 |
| 7 | ELLINGSEN Magnus Dalsbø | Opposite | 193 | 70 | 2004 | 336 | 256 |
| 8 | FOSSELI Max Jørgen | Outside spiker | 183 | 70 | 2003 | 327 | 243 |
| 9 | AASGARD Jens | Outside spiker | 193 | 70 | 2004 | 352 | 253 |
| 10 | EKELAND Lars-Kristian | Outside spiker | 200 | 70 | 2003 | 331 | 255 |
| 11 | EVENSEN Simon | Setter | 188 | 92 | 2003 | 332 | 250 |
| 12 | HALDORSEN Jan Stefan | Middle blocker | 202 | 70 | 2003 | 335 | 260 |
| 13 | KLUNGSØYR Syver Drolsum | Opposite | 197 | 70 | 2003 | 341 | 260 |
| 14 | INGEBRIGTSEN Olav | Middle blocker | 195 | 70 | 2004 | 354 | 261 |
| 15 | FAGERVOLD Johannes Lagesen | Middle blocker | 198 | 70 | 2006 | 328 | 257 |
| 16 | MOL Adrian | Outside spiker | 194 | 70 | 2004 | 315 | 260 |
| 17 | SUNDE Jo Gladsøy | Outside spiker | 190 | 70 | 2003 | 342 | 250 |
| 18 | STRANDBU Elias Solberg | Middle blocker | 199 | 70 | 2004 | 332 | 262 |
| 19 | TJETLAND Birk Eidså | Libero | 184 | 70 | 2003 | 320 | 236 |
