= 2020 Men's U20 Volleyball European Championship =

27th edition of the Men's Junior European Volleyball Championship

2020 Men's U20 European Championship
Tournament details
- Host country: Czech Republic
- Dates: 26 September – 4 October
- Teams: 10 (from 1 confederation)
- Venue: 2 (in 2 host cities)

Final positions
- Champions: Russia (20th title)
- Runners-up: Italy
- Third place: Belgium
- Fourth place: Belarus

Tournament awards
- MVP: (Italy) Alessandro Michieletto
- Best Setter: (Italy) Paolo Porro
- Best OH: (Italy) Tommaso Rinaldi (Russia) Omar Kurbanov
- Best MB: (Belgium) Wout D'Heer (Russia) Iurii Brazhniuk
- Best OPP: (Belgium) Ferre Reggers
- Best Libero: (Russia) Ilia Fedorov

The 2020 Men's U20 Volleyball European Championship was the 27th edition of the Men's Junior European Volleyball Championship, organised by Europe's governing volleyball body, the CEV. The tournament was held in Brno and Kuřim, Czech Republic from 26 September to 4 October 2020. The top two teams of the tournament qualified for the 2021 FIVB Volleyball Men's U21 World Championship as the CEV representatives. But with runners-up Italy hosting the 2021 U21 World Championship together with Bulgaria, 3rd place Belgium joined the field for the 2021 U21 World Championship as well.

Players must be born on or after 1 January 2001.

== Qualification ==
The second and third round qualification were canceled due to the COVID-19 pandemic and the remaining eleven spots were allocated according to the Men's U20 CEV European Ranking as of 1 June 2019. But, Turkey and Ukraine withdrew just before the beginning of the tournament because a small number of their players tested positive for the novel coronavirus shortly upon arrival in the Czech Republic.

- Hosts
  - Czech Republic
- Top eleven ranked teams from the Men's U20 CEV European Ranking as of 1 June 2019 which had not yet qualified
  - Russia
  - Poland
  - Germany
  - Italy
  - ~~Turkey~~
  - France
  - Belarus
  - Serbia
  - ~~Ukraine~~
  - Belgium
  - Netherlands

== Pools composition ==
Hosts Czech Republic and Russia, the top team from the Men's U20 CEV European Ranking as of 1 June 2019, were directly placed as head of pool I and II respectively. All teams not seeded were placed to five pots as based on their Men's U20 CEV European Ranking as of 1 June 2019 position and drawn accordingly into pool I and II. In case several teams shared the same position, the teams were seeded as per the final standing of the 2018 Men's U20 European Championship. The draw was held in Luxembourg City, Luxembourg on 27 August 2020. But, Turkey and Ukraine withdrew after the draw. Rankings are shown in brackets except the hosts who ranked 5th.

Seeded teams	Pot 1	Pot 2	Pot 3	Pot 4	Pot 5
Czech Republic (Hosts); Russia (1)	Poland (2); Germany (3)	Italy (3); Turkey (6)	France (7); Belarus (8)	Serbia (9); Ukraine (10)	Belgium (11); Netherlands (11)

Draw

Pool I	Pool II
Czech Republic	Russia
Poland	Germany
Italy	~~Turkey~~
France	Belarus
Serbia	~~Ukraine~~
Belgium	Netherlands

== Venues ==
- Kuřim Sport Hall, Kuřim, Czech Republic – Pool I
- Sportovní hala Vodova, Brno, Czech Republic – Pool I, II and Final round

== Pool standing procedure ==
1. Number of matches won
2. Match points
3. Sets ratio
4. Points ratio
5. If the tie continues as per the point ratio between two teams, the priority will be given to the team which won the match between them. When the tie in points ratio is between three or more teams, a new classification of these teams in the terms of points 1, 2, 3 and 4 will be made taking into consideration only the matches in which they were opposed to each other.

Match won 3–0 or 3–1: 3 match points for the winner, 0 match points for the loser
Match won 3–2: 2 match points for the winner, 1 match point for the loser

== Preliminary round ==
- All times are Central European Summer Time (UTC+02:00).

=== Pool I ===
Pos	Team	Pld	W	L	Pts	SW	SL	SR	SPW	SPL	SPR	Qualification
1	Italy	5	5	0	15	15	0	MAX	383	297	1.290	Semifinals
2	Belgium	5	4	1	10	12	7	1.714	429	381	1.126	Semifinals
3	France	5	3	2	9	11	8	1.375	430	416	1.034	5th–8th semifinals
4	Poland	5	2	3	7	8	9	0.889	383	376	1.019	5th–8th semifinals
5	Serbia	5	1	4	2	3	14	0.214	304	394	0.772	
6	Czech Republic	5	0	5	2	4	15	0.267	379	444	0.854	

Date	Time	Venue		Score		Set 1	Set 2	Set 3	Set 4	Set 5	Total	Report
26 Sep	16:00	KSH	Italy	3–0	Belgium	25–18	25–20	25–14			75–52	Report
26 Sep	18:30	KSH	Czech Republic	2–3	France	21–25	22–25	25–23	27–25	16–18	111–116	Report
26 Sep	18:30	SHV	Poland	3–0	Serbia	25–19	25–16	25–18			75–53	Report
27 Sep	16:00	KSH	Italy	3–0	Poland	26–24	29–27	25–20			80–71	Report
27 Sep	18:30	SHV	Belgium	3–2	France	24–26	25–20	23–25	26–24	15–9	113–104	Report
27 Sep	18:30	KSH	Serbia	3–2	Czech Republic	20–25	17–25	25–16	25–19	15–9	102–94	Report
28 Sep	15:30	KSH	France	3–0	Serbia	25–20	25–16	25–18			75–54	Report
28 Sep	16:00	SHV	Poland	2–3	Belgium	29–27	25–22	16–25	23–25	8–15	101–114	Report
28 Sep	18:10	KSH	Czech Republic	0–3	Italy	15–25	24–26	23–25			62–76	Report
30 Sep	16:00	SHV	Italy	3–0	France	25–22	27–25	25–13			77–60	Report
30 Sep	16:00	KSH	Belgium	3–0	Serbia	25–14	25–12	25–17			75–43	Report
30 Sep	18:30	KSH	Poland	3–0	Czech Republic	25–23	25–11	25–20			75–54	Report
1 Oct	15:00	KSH	France	3–0	Poland	25–23	25–19	25–19			75–61	Report
1 Oct	17:30	KSH	Serbia	0–3	Italy	20–25	16–25	16–25			52–75	Report
1 Oct	20:00	KSH	Czech Republic	0–3	Belgium	18–25	19–25	21–25			58–75	Report

=== Pool II ===
Pos	Team	Pld	W	L	Pts	SW	SL	SR	SPW	SPL	SPR	Qualification
1	Russia	3	3	0	8	9	3	3.000	281	249	1.129	Semifinals
2	Belarus	3	2	1	6	7	3	2.333	243	214	1.136	Semifinals
3	Netherlands	3	1	2	3	3	7	0.429	219	236	0.928	5th–8th semifinals
4	Germany	3	0	3	1	3	9	0.333	236	280	0.843	5th–8th semifinals

Date	Time		Score		Set 1	Set 2	Set 3	Set 4	Set 5	Total	Report
26 Sep	16:00	Russia	3–1	Belarus	30–28	18–25	25–22	25–18		98–93	Report
27 Sep	16:00	Germany	1–3	Netherlands	17–25	25–19	18–25	26–28		86–97	Report
28 Sep	18:45	Netherlands	0–3	Belarus	20–25	20–25	21–25			61–75	Report
30 Sep	18:30	Germany	2–3	Russia	23–25	25–20	17–25	25–23	5–15	95–108	Report
1 Oct	16:00	Belarus	3–0	Germany	25–20	25–12	25–23			75–55	Report
1 Oct	18:30	Russia	3–0	Netherlands	25–21	25–19	25–21			75–61	Report

== Final round ==
- All times are Central European Summer Time (UTC+02:00).

=== 5th–8th places ===
5th–8th semifinals
3 October
France	3
Germany	2
3 October
Netherlands	3
Poland	2

5th place match
4 October
France	3
Netherlands	2
7th place match
4 October
Germany	0
Poland	3

==== 5th–8th semifinals ====
Date	Time		Score		Set 1	Set 2	Set 3	Set 4	Set 5	Total	Report
3 Oct	12:30	France	3–2	Germany	25–23	25–21	18–25	19–25	15–9	102–103	Report
3 Oct	15:30	Netherlands	3–2	Poland	25–23	18–25	25–23	13–25	15–13	96–109	Report

==== 7th place match ====
Date	Time		Score		Set 1	Set 2	Set 3	Set 4	Set 5	Total	Report
4 Oct	10:30	Germany	0–3	Poland	16–25	18–25	20–25			54–75	Report

==== 5th place match ====
Date	Time		Score		Set 1	Set 2	Set 3	Set 4	Set 5	Total	Report
4 Oct	13:00	France	3–2	Netherlands	25–17	21–25	25–21	18–25	15–9	104–97	Report

=== Final four ===
Semifinals
3 October
Italy	3
Belarus	0
3 October
Russia	3
Belgium	2

Final
4 October
Italy	1
Russia	3
3rd place match
4 October
Belarus	0
Belgium	3

==== Semifinals ====
Date	Time		Score		Set 1	Set 2	Set 3	Set 4	Set 5	Total	Report
3 Oct	18:20	Italy	3–0	Belarus	25–19	25–18	25–19			75–56	Report
3 Oct	20:15	Russia	3–2	Belgium	25–17	19–25	18–25	25–22	15–13	102–102	Report

==== 3rd place match ====
Date	Time		Score		Set 1	Set 2	Set 3	Set 4	Set 5	Total	Report
4 Oct	15:45	Belarus	0–3	Belgium	19–25	15–25	27–29			61–79	Report

==== Final ====
Date	Time		Score		Set 1	Set 2	Set 3	Set 4	Set 5	Total	Report
4 Oct	18:00	Italy	1–3	Russia	23–25	25–12	24–26	25–27		97–90	Report

== Final standing ==
Rank	Team
1st place, gold medalist(s)	Russia
2nd place, silver medalist(s)	Italy
3rd place, bronze medalist(s)	Belgium
4	Belarus
5	France
6	Netherlands
7	Poland
8	Germany
9	Serbia
10	Czech Republic

Qualified for the 2021 U21 World Championship
Already qualified as hosts for the 2021 U21 World Championship

2020 Men's U20 European champions

Russia
20th title

12–man roster
Anton Anoshko, Mikhail Fedorov, Iurii Brazhniuk, Stanislav Dineykin, Kirill Ionov, Ilya Kazachenkov (c), Omar Kurbanov, Roman Murashko, Ilia Fedorov, Egor Kasatkin, Mikhail Vyshnikov, Nikita Morozov
Head coach
Mikhail Nikolaev

== Awards ==
- Most valuable player
  (Italy) Alessandro Michieletto
- Best setter
  (Italy) Paolo Porro
- Best outside spikers
  (Italy) Tommaso Rinaldi
  (Russia) Omar Kurbanov
- Best middle blockers
  (Belgium) Wout D'Heer
  (Russia) Iurii Brazhniuk
- Best opposite spiker
  (Belgium) Ferre Reggers
- Best libero
  (Russia) Ilia Fedorov

== See also ==
- 2020 Women's U19 Volleyball European Championship
