= Netherlands men's national under-21 volleyball team =

Netherlands U21
- Association: Dutch Volleyball Federation
- Confederation: CEV

Uniforms
Home	Away	Third

FIVB U21 World Championship
- Appearances: 3 (First in 1985)
- Best result: 4th place : (2005)

Europe U21 / U20 Championship
- Appearances: Data uncompleted
- Best result: (silver) Runners-up : (2004)
- www.volleybal.nl (in Dutch)

The Netherlands men's national under-21 volleyball team represents the Netherlands in international men's volleyball competitions and friendly matches under the age of 21 and it is ruled by the Dutch Volleyball Association body that is an affiliate of the Federation of International Volleyball FIVB and also part of the European Volleyball Confederation CEV.

== Results ==
=== FIVB U21 World Championship ===
Champions Runners up Third place Fourth place

FIVB U21 World Championship
Year	Round	Position	Pld	W	L	SW	SL	Squad
(Brazil) 1977	Didn't qualify							
(United States) 1981	Didn't qualify							
(Italy) 1985		8th place						
(Bahrain) 1987	Didn't qualify							
(Greece) 1989	Didn't qualify							
(Egypt) 1991	Didn't qualify							
(Argentina) 1993	Didn't qualify							
(Malaysia) 1995		6th place						
(Bahrain) 1997	Didn't qualify							
(Thailand) 1999	Didn't qualify							
(Poland) 2001	Didn't qualify							
(Iran) 2003	Didn't qualify							
(India) 2005		4th place						
(Morocco) 2007	Didn't qualify							
(India) 2009	Didn't qualify							
(Brazil) 2011	Didn't qualify							
(Turkey) 2013	Didn't qualify							
(Mexico) 2015	Didn't qualify							
(Czech Republic) 2017	Didn't qualify							
(Bahrain) 2019	Didn't qualify							
(Italy) (Bulgaria) 2021	Didn't qualify							
(Bahrain) 2023	Didn't qualify							
(China) 2025	Didn't qualify							
Total	0 Titles	3/23						

== Team ==
=== Current squad ===
The following players are the Dutch players that have competed in the 2018 Men's U20 Volleyball European Championship

#	name	position	height	weight	birthday	spike	block
1	van andel jordi	libero	185	85	1999	318	303
2	benne nimo	outside-spiker	199	91	2000	340	325
3	nijeboer daan	libero	185	85	2000	318	303
4	abraham cas	outside-spiker	191	86	1999	337	320
5	van dam noah	setter	193	85	1999	330	314
6	tijhuis sjors	middle-blocker	196	86	2000	341	326
7	tuinstra bennie	outside-spiker	197	84	2000	346	320
8	luini leon	outside-spiker	200	87	2000	345	334
9	van solkema rik	opposite	198	92	1999	341	321
10	bes david	middle-blocker	202	85	1999	348	334
11	streutker daan	opposite	200	88	1999	348	334
12	berkhout joris	setter	196	78	1999	346	320
14	brilhuis martijn	opposite	201	92	2001	345	334
15	hofhuis luuk	middle-blocker	201	96	2001	338	325
15	van muijden jesper	middle-blocker	199	93	2001	345	322
16	de jong tieme	setter	194	87	2001	321	311
17	bak yannick	outside-spiker	196	72	2001	331	316
18	hoge bavel luuk	outside-spiker	194	81	2001	328	319
18	martherus nick	libero	180	68	2001	321	313
19	meijs alex	outside-spiker	190	70	1999	337	320
20	bakker niek	outside-spiker	190	70	1999	337	330
21	de hoogh jens	outside-spiker	190	70	1999	337	320
