= Serbia men's national under-21 volleyball team =

National sports team

Serbia U21
- Association: Volleyball Federation of Serbia
- Confederation: CEV

Uniforms
Home	Away	Third

FIVB U21 World Championship
- Appearances: 2 (First in 2011)
- Best result: (bronze) Third place : (2011)

Europe U21 / U20 Championship
- Appearances: Data uncompleted
- Best result: (bronze) Third place : (2010)
- Official website

The Serbia men's national under-21 volleyball team represents Serbia in international men's volleyball competitions and friendly matches under the age 21 and it is ruled by the Volleyball Federation of Serbia body that is an affiliate of the Federation of International Volleyball FIVB and also part of the European Volleyball Confederation CEV.

== Results ==
=== FIVB U21 World Championship ===
Champions Runners up Third place Fourth place

FIVB U21 World Championship
Year	Round	Position	Pld	W	L	SW	SL	Squad
(Brazil) 1977	See Yugoslavia							
(United States) 1981	See Yugoslavia							
(Italy) 1985	See Yugoslavia							
(Bahrain) 1987	See Yugoslavia							
(Greece) 1989	See Yugoslavia							
(Egypt) 1991	See Serbia and Montenegro							
(Argentina) 1993	See Serbia and Montenegro							
(Malaysia) 1995	See Serbia and Montenegro							
(Bahrain) 1997	See Serbia and Montenegro							
(Thailand) 1999	See Serbia and Montenegro							
(Poland) 2001	See Serbia and Montenegro							
(Iran) 2003	See Serbia and Montenegro							
(India) 2005	See Serbia and Montenegro							
(Morocco) 2007	Didn't qualify							
(India) 2009	Didn't qualify							
(Brazil) 2011	Final	Third place	5	4	1	13	8	
(Turkey) 2013	Final sixteen	9th place	8	7	1	23	5	
(Mexico) 2015	Didn't qualify							
(Czech Republic) 2017	Didn't qualify							
(Bahrain) 2019	Didn't qualify							
(Italy) (Bulgaria) 2021	Didn't qualify							
(Bahrain) 2023	Didn't qualify							
(China) 2025	Didn't qualify							
Total	0 Titles	2/23	13	11	2	36	13	

== Team ==
=== Current squad ===
The following players are the Serbs players that have competed in the 2018 Men's U20 Volleyball European Championship

#	name	position	height	weight	birthday	spike	block
	bajandic lazar	outside-spiker	195	77	1999	325	305
	batak aleksa	setter	200	87	2000	335	320
	bosnjak aleksandar	middle-blocker	204	85	2000	325	315
	brboric radoslav	libero	188	85	2000	315	290
	dordevic dimitrije	outside-spiker	195	78	1999	335	320
	golubovic borivoje	outside-spiker	193	79	2000	332	317
	huzeirovic andrej	setter	182	73	1999	320	310
	ivankovic vuk	opposite	198	92	1999	340	315
	konicanin ermin	middle-blocker	203	90	1999	338	326
	kovac davide	outside-spiker	197	79	1999	335	325
	lecic marko	middle-blocker	202	93	1999	337	318
	lekic filip	middle-blocker	204	88	1999	343	320
	markovic ivan	setter	189	79	1999	318	305
	matic aleksa	opposite	209	103	1999	335	322
	meljanac nikola	middle-blocker	200	100	1999	350	330
	negic stefan	libero	180	75	2000	305	290
	pajkic milan	middle-blocker	201	90	2000	335	320
	paunovic stanislav	opposite	203	94	1999	350	331
	prisic veljko	outside-spiker	196	81	2000	334	315
	prusevic samed	outside-spiker	197	81	1999	335	320
	rudic andrej	middle-blocker	201	91	1999	345	320
	skakic stefan	outside-spiker	195	89	1999	330	320
	stepanovic jovan	outside-spiker	193	80	2001	325	310
	tadic luka	outside-spiker	203	100	2000	340	320
	tonic nikola	setter	189	73	1999	315	300
	trifunovic filip	libero	186	69	1999	305	300
	vujovic nikola	outside-spiker	197	83	2000	334	313
	vukmirovic jovan	outside-spiker	194	80	2000	335	320
