= Ukraine men's national under-21 volleyball team =

Ukraine U21
- Association: Федерація Волейболу України
- Confederation: CEV
- Head coach: Volodymyr Romantsov

Uniforms
Home

FIVB U21 World Championship
- Appearances: 4 (First in 1999)
- Best result: 9th (1999, 2025)

European U21 / U20 Championship
- Appearances: Data incomplete
- Best result: (silver) (2016)
- www.fvu.in.ua (in Ukrainian)

The Ukraine men's national under-21 volleyball team (Ukrainian: Юніорська збірна України з волейболу, Yuniorska zbirna Ukrainy z voleibolu) represents Ukraine in international men's volleyball competitions and friendly matches under the age 21.

== Results ==
=== FIVB U21 World Championship ===
Champions Runners up Third place Fourth place

FIVB U21 World Championship
Year	Round	Position	Pld	W	L	SW	SL	Squad
(Brazil) 1977	Part of Soviet Union							
(United States) 1981	Part of Soviet Union							
(Italy) 1985	Part of Soviet Union							
(Bahrain) 1987	Part of Soviet Union							
(Greece) 1989	Part of Soviet Union							
(Egypt) 1991	Part of Soviet Union							
(Argentina) 1993	Did not qualify							
(Malaysia) 1995	Did not qualify							
(Bahrain) 1997	Did not qualify							
(Thailand) 1999		9th place						
(Poland) 2001		13th place						
(Iran) 2003	Did not qualify							
(India) 2005	Did not qualify							
(Morocco) 2007	Did not qualify							
(India) 2009	Did not qualify							
(Brazil) 2011	Did not qualify							
(Turkey) 2013	Did not qualify							
(Mexico) 2015	Did not qualify							
(Czech Republic) 2017	11th place match	11th place	8	3	5	14	18	Squad
(Bahrain) 2019	Did not qualify							
(Italy) (Bulgaria) 2021	Did not qualify							
(Bahrain) 2023	Did not qualify							
(China) 2025	9th place match	9th place	9	6	3	20	14	Squad
Total	0 Titles	4/23						

== Team ==
=== Current roster ===
The following is the Ukrainian roster in the 2020 Men's U20 Volleyball European Championship.

Head coach:	(Ukraine) Volodymyr Romantsov
Assistants:	(Ukraine) Anatoliy Yanushchyk

No.	Name	Date of birth	Height	Weight	Spike	Block	Club
1	Nazar Hetman	18 June 2003	1.93 m (6 ft 4 in)	76 kg (168 lb)	330 cm (130 in)	315 cm (124 in)	(Ukraine) Bakhmut-ShVSM
2	Oleksandr Fedorenko	28 April 2001	1.82 m (6 ft 0 in)	66 kg (146 lb)	310 cm (120 in)	315 cm (124 in)	(Ukraine) SumDU Sumy
3	Illia Yehoshyn	16 February 2001	1.90 m (6 ft 3 in)	74 kg (163 lb)	320 cm (130 in)	305 cm (120 in)	(Ukraine) Yurydychna Akademiya Kharkiv
4	Denys Karpenko	21 February 2001	2.00 m (6 ft 7 in)	87 kg (192 lb)	315 cm (124 in)	325 cm (128 in)	(Ukraine) Burevisnyk
5	Ivan Shkurat	4 December 2002	1.94 m (6 ft 4 in)	76 kg (168 lb)	325 cm (128 in)	315 cm (124 in)	(Ukraine) SumDU Sumy
6	Yaroslav Pilhun	1 January 2001	1.86 m (6 ft 1 in)	92 kg (203 lb)	330 cm (130 in)	315 cm (124 in)	(Ukraine) Yurydychna Akademiya Kharkiv
7	Artem Troianovskyi	24 July 2001	1.96 m (6 ft 5 in)	84 kg (185 lb)	330 cm (130 in)	315 cm (124 in)	(Ukraine) Lokomotyv Kharkiv
8	Danylo Uryvkin	27 May 2001	1.97 m (6 ft 6 in)	84 kg (185 lb)	340 cm (130 in)	320 cm (130 in)	(Ukraine) MHP-Vinnytsia
9	Ihor Ivanov	14 July 2001	1.91 m (6 ft 3 in)	72 kg (159 lb)	321 cm (126 in)	290 cm (110 in)	(Ukraine) Lokomotyv Kharkiv
10	Mykola Bovsunovskyi	11 April 2001	1.85 m (6 ft 1 in)	97 kg (214 lb)	315 cm (124 in)	305 cm (120 in)	(Ukraine) NUFVSU Kyiv
11	Maksym Donets	23 February 2003	1.93 m (6 ft 4 in)	78 kg (172 lb)	335 cm (132 in)	320 cm (130 in)	(Ukraine) Lokomotyv Kharkiv
12	Vladyslav Shchurov	1 January 2001	2.08 m (6 ft 10 in)	86 kg (190 lb)	360 cm (140 in)	340 cm (130 in)	(Ukraine) MHP-Vinnytsia
13	Roman Andrieiev	19 July 2001	1.95 m (6 ft 5 in)	95 kg (209 lb)	335 cm (132 in)	320 cm (130 in)	(Ukraine) Yurydychna Akademiya Kharkiv
14	Danylo Pashchenko	10 September 2001	2.00 m (6 ft 7 in)	86 kg (190 lb)	330 cm (130 in)	315 cm (124 in)	(Ukraine) Lokomotyv Kharkiv
15	Stanislav Zalizko	22 April 2001	1.90 m (6 ft 3 in)	94 kg (207 lb)	315 cm (124 in)	305 cm (120 in)	(Ukraine) Free agent
17	Kostiantyn Borshchenko	1 January 2002	1.97 m (6 ft 6 in)	78 kg (172 lb)	320 cm (130 in)	310 cm (120 in)	(Ukraine) SumDU Sumy
18	Oleksandr Boiko	1 January 2002	1.80 m (5 ft 11 in)	75 kg (165 lb)	320 cm (130 in)	335 cm (132 in)	(Ukraine) Free agent
19	Illia Chaban	20 June 2003	1.95 m (6 ft 5 in)	88 kg (194 lb)	335 cm (132 in)	320 cm (130 in)	(Ukraine) Free agent
20	Hryhorii Tsupin	29 May 2002	2.02 m (6 ft 8 in)	96 kg (212 lb)	340 cm (130 in)	315 cm (124 in)	(Ukraine) Yurydychna Akademiya Kharkiv
21	Yaroslav Pampushko	11 November 2001	1.76 m (5 ft 9 in)	1 kg (2.2 lb)	285 cm (112 in)	268 cm (106 in)	(Ukraine) MHP-Vinnytsia
22	Borys Yakovliev	24 June 2003	1.80 m (5 ft 11 in)	76 kg (168 lb)	340 cm (130 in)	315 cm (124 in)	(Ukraine) Lokomotyv Kharkiv
23	Maksym Rudenko	1 January 2001	1.84 m (6 ft 0 in)	74 kg (163 lb)	325 cm (128 in)	295 cm (116 in)	(Ukraine) Free agent
24	Andrii Ratushniak	12 December 2001	2.01 m (6 ft 7 in)	86 kg (190 lb)	335 cm (132 in)	320 cm (130 in)	(Ukraine) MHP-Vinnytsia
25	Stanislav Velychko	5 July 2001	2.00 m (6 ft 7 in)	93 kg (205 lb)	340 cm (130 in)	315 cm (124 in)	(Ukraine) Free agent

== See also ==
- Ukraine men's national volleyball team
- Ukraine women's national volleyball team
