= Czech Republic men's national under-21 volleyball team =

Czech Republic under 21 men's football team

Czech Republic U21
- Association: Czech Volleyball Federation
- Confederation: CEV

Uniforms
Home	Away	Third

FIVB U21 World Championship
- Appearances: 1 (First in 2017)
- Best result: 15th place : (2017)

Europe U21 / U20 Championship
- Appearances: Data uncompleted
- Best result: (silver) Runners-up :(2018)
- www.cvf.cz (in Czech)

The Czech Republic men's national under-21 volleyball team represents Czech Republic in international men's volleyball competitions and friendly matches under the age 21 and it is ruled by the Czech Volleyball Association body that is an affiliate of the Federation of International Volleyball FIVB and also part of the European Volleyball Confederation CEV.

== Results ==
=== FIVB U21 World Championship ===
Champions Runners up Third place Fourth place

FIVB U21 World Championship
Year	Round	Position	Pld	W	L	SW	SL	Squad
(Brazil) 1977	Didn't qualify							
(United States) 1981	Didn't qualify							
(Italy) 1985	Didn't qualify							
(Bahrain) 1987	Didn't qualify							
(Greece) 1989	Didn't qualify							
(Egypt) 1991	Didn't qualify							
(Argentina) 1993	Didn't qualify							
(Malaysia) 1995	Didn't qualify							
(Bahrain) 1997	Didn't qualify							
(Thailand) 1999	Didn't qualify							
(Poland) 2001	Didn't qualify							
(Iran) 2003	Didn't qualify							
(India) 2005	Didn't qualify							
(Morocco) 2007	Didn't qualify							
(India) 2009	Didn't qualify							
(Brazil) 2011	Didn't qualify							
(Turkey) 2013	Didn't qualify							
(Mexico) 2015	Didn't qualify							
(Czech Republic) 2017		15th place						
(Bahrain) 2019		9th place						
(Italy) (Bulgaria) 2021		8th place						
(Bahrain) 2023		10th place						
(China) 2025		4th place						
Total	0 Titles	5/23						

== Team ==
=== Current squad ===
The following players are the Czech players that have competed in the 2018 Men's U20 Volleyball European Championship

#	name	position	height	weight	birthday	spike	block
1	Jan Pavlicek	libero	175	69	2000	308	302
2	Radim Sulc	setter	184	74	1999	329	318
3	Martin Gerza	libero	174	76	1999	302	300
4	Ondrej Piskacek	setter	191	75	1999	328	314
5	Josef Polak	middle-blocker	202	82	1999	355	330
6	Filip Humler	setter	200	95	1999	350	325
7	Miroslav Drozen	outside-spiker	198	93	1999	347	323
8	Jakub Lzicar	libero	187	87	1999	320	303
9	Adam Kozak	outside-spiker	194	83	1999	343	324
10	Jan Svoboda	outside-spiker	195	86	2000	340	320
11	Lukas Vasina	outside-spiker	195	79	1999	340	320
12	Adam Provaznik	setter	196	90	2000	339	318
13	Jiri Toman	opposite	197	90	2000	338	317
14	Michal Rohacek	outside-spiker	195	91	1999	335	318
15	Pavel Horak	middle-blocker	201	82	1999	339	320
16	Jiri Srb	setter	193	79	2000	341	321
17	Marek Sotola	opposite	203	85	1999	350	328
18	Jakub Varous	middle-blocker	200	100	1999	340	328
19	Radek Balaz	middle-blocker	201	88	2001	345	319
20	Lukas Trojanowicz	middle-blocker	199	73	2000	345	329
21	Martin Chevalier	opposite	196	85	2000	345	322
22	Matyas Dzavoronok	setter	197	85	2001	335	322
