= East Germany men's national under-21 volleyball team =

East Germany U21
- Association: East German Volleyball Federation
- Confederation: CEV

Uniforms
Home	Away	Third

FIVB U21 World Championship
- Appearances: No Appearances

Europe U21 / U20 Championship
- Appearances: 12 (First in 1966)
- Best result: (bronze) Third place :(1977, 1979, 1982)

The East Germany men's national under-21 volleyball team represented the East Germany in international men's volleyball competitions and friendly matches under the age 21. It was ruled by the East German Volleyball Federation, that was an affiliate member of the Federation of International Volleyball (FIVB) as well it was a part of the European Volleyball Confederation (CEV).

After German reunification it became a part of United Germany U-21 team.

== Results ==
=== FIVB U21 World Championship ===
Champions Runners-up 3rd place 4th place

FIVB U21 World Championship
Year	Round	Position	Pld	W	L	SW	SL	Squad
(Brazil) 1977	Didn't Qualify							
(United States) 1981	Didn't Qualify							
(Italy) 1985	Didn't Qualify							
(Bahrain) 1987	Didn't Qualify							
(Greece) 1989	Didn't Qualify							
(Egypt) 1991	Didn't Qualify							
Total	0 Titles	0/6						

=== Europe U21 / 20 Championship ===
Champions Runners-up 3rd place 4th place

Europe U21 / 20 Championship
Year	Round	Position	Pld	W	L	SW	SL	Squad
(Hungary) 1966		9th place						
(Soviet Union) 1969		5th place						
(Spain) 1971		4th place						
(Netherlands) 1973		7th place						
(West Germany) 1975		4th place						
(France) 1977		Third place						
(Portugal) 1979		Third place						
(West Germany) 1982		Third place						
(France) 1984		6th place						
(Hungary) 1986		7th place						
(Italy) 1988		5th place						
(West Germany) 1990		6th place						
Total	0 Titles	12/12						
