= Czechoslovakia men's national under-21 volleyball team =

Czechoslovakia U21
- Association: Czechoslovak Volleyball Federation
- Confederation: CEV

Uniforms
Home	Away	Third

FIVB U21 World Championship
- Appearances: 2 (First in 1991)
- Best result: (bronze) Third place : (1993)

Europe U21 / U20 Championship
- Appearances: 12 (First in 1966)
- Best result: (silver) Runners-Up :(1973, 1975, 1977)
- www.cvf.cz (in Czech)

The Czechoslovakia men's national under-21 volleyball team represented Czechoslovakia in international men's volleyball competitions and friendly matches under the age 21. It was ruled by the Czechoslovak Volleyball Federation, that was an affiliate member of the Federation of International Volleyball (FIVB) and was a part of the European Volleyball Confederation (CEV).

== Results ==
=== FIVB U21 World Championship ===
Champions Runners-up 3rd place 4th place

FIVB U21 World Championship
Year	Round	Position	Pld	W	L	SW	SL	Squad
(Brazil) 1977	Didn't Qualify							
(United States) 1981	Didn't Qualify							
(Italy) 1985	Didn't Qualify							
(Bahrain) 1987	Didn't Qualify							
(Greece) 1989	Didn't Qualify							
(Egypt) 1991		7th place						
(Argentina) 1993		Third place						
Total	0 Titles	2/7						

=== Europe U21 / 20 Championship ===
Champions Runners-up 3rd place 4th place

Europe U21 / 20 Championship
Year	Round	Position	Pld	W	L	SW	SL	Squad
(Hungary) 1966		Third place						
(Soviet Union) 1969		6th place						
(Spain) 1971		7th place						
(Netherlands) 1973		Runners-Up						
(West Germany) 1975		Runners-Up						
(France) 1977		Runners-Up						
(Portugal) 1979		4th place						
(West Germany) 1982		6th place						
(France) 1984	Didn't Qualify							
(Hungary) 1986		10th place						
(Italy) 1988		8th place						
(West Germany) 1990		4th place						
(Poland) 1992		4th place						
Total	0 Titles	12/13						
