= Nigeria men's national under-21 volleyball team =

Nigeria
- Association: Nigeria Volleyball Federation
- Head coach: Sani Mohammed

Uniforms
Home

The Nigeria men's national under-21 volleyball team represents Nigeria in international men's under-21 volleyball competitions and friendly matches.

== Team achievements ==
The Team finished in fourth place at the 2022 African U-21 Men's Volleyball Championship in Tunisia.

As a result of this position, the Team failed to pick one of the slots to the 2023 Federation of International Volleyball World Cup Championship due to the loss against Morocco.

The Nigeria Team finished in the fifth place when the championship was hosted in Abuja by winning DR Congo.

== Team Players ==
Some of the players that were invited for training ahead of the beach volleyball championship in Thailand in 2021 includes; Emenike Collins, Chidiebere Okeke, Safa Collins and Sunday Jibril.
