= Soviet Union men's national under-21 volleyball team =

Soviet national volleyball team

Soviet Union U21
- Association: Volleyball Federation Of the Soviet Union
- Confederation: CEV

Uniforms
Home	Away	Third

FIVB U21 World Championship
- Appearances: 6 (First in 1977)
- Best result: (gold) Champions : (1977, 1981, 1985, 1989)

Europe U21 / U20 Championship
- Appearances: 12 (First in 1966)
- Best result: (gold) Champions :(1966, 1969, 1971, 1973, 1975, 1977, 1979, 1982, 1984, 1988, 1990)
- www.volley.ru (in Russian)

The Soviet Union men's national under-21 volleyball team represents the Soviet Union in international men's volleyball competitions and friendly matches under the age 21. It was ruled by the Soviet Volleyball Federation, that was an affiliate member of the Federation of International Volleyball (FIVB) as well it was a part of the European Volleyball Confederation (CEV).

== Results ==
=== FIVB U21 World Championship ===
Champions Runners-up 3rd place 4th place

FIVB U21 World Championship
Year	Round	Position	Pld	W	L	SW	SL	Squad
(Brazil) 1977		Champions						
(United States) 1981		Champions						
(Italy) 1985		Champions						
(Bahrain) 1987		Third place						
(Greece) 1989		Champions						
(Egypt) 1991		Third place						
Total	4 Titles	6/6						

=== Europe U21 / 20 Championship ===
Champions Runners-up 3rd place 4th place

Europe U21 / 20 Championship
Year	Round	Position	Pld	W	L	SW	SL	Squad
(Hungary) 1966		Champions						
(Soviet Union) 1969		Champions						
(Spain) 1971		Champions						
(Netherlands) 1973		Champions						
(West Germany) 1975		Champions						
(France) 1977		Champions						
(Portugal) 1979		Champions						
(West Germany) 1982		Champions						
(France) 1984		Champions						
(Hungary) 1986		4th place						
(Italy) 1988		Champions						
(West Germany) 1990		Champions						
Total	11 Titles	12/12						
