= 2025 FIVB Volleyball Men's U21 World Championship =

Volleyball tournament in China

2025年世界U21男排锦标赛

Tournament details
- Host country: China
- City: Jiangmen
- Dates: 21–31 August
- Teams: 24 (from 5 confederations)
- Venue: 1 (in 1 host city)

Final positions
- Champions: Iran (3rd title)
- Runners-up: Italy
- Third place: United States
- Fourth place: Czech Republic

Tournament awards
- MVP: (Iran) Seyed Matin Hosseini
- Best Setter: (Iran) Emran Kook Jili
- Best OH: (Iran) Seyed Matin Hosseini; (United States) Sean Kelly
- Best MB: (Iran) Taha Behboudnia; (Italy) Pardo Mati
- Best OPP: (Italy) Tommaso Barotto
- Best Libero: (Iran) Seyed Morteza Tabatabaei

Tournament statistics
- Matches played: 104
- Attendance: 26,677 (257 per match)

The 2025 FIVB Volleyball Men's U21 World Championship was the 23rd edition of the FIVB Volleyball Men's U21 World Championship, contested by the men's national teams under the age of 21 of the members of the Fédération Internationale de Volleyball (FIVB), the sport's global governing body. It was held in Jiangmen Sports Center at Jiangmen, China from 21 to 31 August 2025.

Starting with this edition, the tournament was expanded to include 24 teams instead of 16 teams of previous editions, following a decision adopted by FIVB in June 2023.

Defending champions, Iran, claimed their third title after defeating Italy in the final. The United States defeated Czech Republic in the third-place match and clinched their first medal in the competition. Seyed Matin Hosseini of Iran was named the MVP of the tournament.

== Host selection ==
On 28 March 2024, FIVB opened the bidding process for member associations whose countries were interested in hosting one of the four Age Group World Championships in 2025 (i.e., U19 Boys' and Girls' World Championships and U21 Men's and Women's World Championships). The expression of interest of the member associations had to be submitted to FIVB by 30 April 2024, 18:00 CEST (UTC+2).

On 10 September 2024, FIVB announced that China had been selected as the host for the 2024 Boys' U21 World Championship.

== Qualification ==
A total of 24 national teams qualified for the final tournament. In addition to the host team and the defending champions who qualified automatically, 20 other teams were qualified through five separate continental competitions which were required to held no later than 31 December 2024. Two remaining teams entered the tournament via the Men's U21 FIVB World Ranking (as of 31 December 2024) among the teams not yet qualified.

The slot allocation per confederation was set as follows:

- Defending champion (Iran): 1
- AVC (Asia & Oceania): 4
- CAVB (Africa): 3
- CEV (Europe): 6
- CSV (South America): 3
- NORCECA (North, Central America and Caribbean): 4
- Host: 1
- Top teams not yet qualified as per Men's U21 FIVB World Ranking: 2

=== Qualified teams ===
The following 24 teams qualified for the tournament.

Confederation	Qualifying tournament	Team qualified	Appearances			Previous best performance
Confederation	Qualifying tournament	Team qualified	Total	First	Last	Previous best performance
AVC (Asia & Oceania)	Host nation	China	17th	1977	2019	Runners-up (1977)
AVC (Asia & Oceania)	Defending champions	Iran	15th	1993	2023	Champions (2019, 2023)
AVC (Asia & Oceania)	2024 Asian Men's U20 Championship ( (Indonesia) Surabaya, 23–30 July)	South Korea	14th	1977	2019	Champions (1987)
AVC (Asia & Oceania)	2024 Asian Men's U20 Championship ( (Indonesia) Surabaya, 23–30 July)	Japan	14th	1977	2017	Runners-up (1989)
AVC (Asia & Oceania)	2024 Asian Men's U20 Championship ( (Indonesia) Surabaya, 23–30 July)	Indonesia	2nd	1989		Fifteenth (1989)
AVC (Asia & Oceania)	2024 Asian Men's U20 Championship ( (Indonesia) Surabaya, 23–30 July)	Kazakhstan	1st	Debut		None
AVC (Asia & Oceania)	Men's U21 FIVB World Ranking	Thailand	4th	1999	2023	Eighth place (2023)
CAVB (Africa)	2024 Men's U20 African Nations Championship ( (Tunisia) Tunis, 5–10 August)	Tunisia	14th	1985	2023	Ninth place (1999, 2005)
CAVB (Africa)	2024 Men's U20 African Nations Championship ( (Tunisia) Tunis, 5–10 August)	Egypt	15th	1981	2023	Ninth place (2003, 2023)
CAVB (Africa)	2024 Men's U20 African Nations Championship ( (Tunisia) Tunis, 5–10 August)	Morocco	8th	1999	2021	Ninth place (2005)
CEV (Europe)	2024 Men's U20 European Championship ( (Serbia) Vrnjačka Banja and (Greece) Arta, 26 August–7 September)	France	7th	1985	2015	Runners-up (1999)
CEV (Europe)	2024 Men's U20 European Championship ( (Serbia) Vrnjačka Banja and (Greece) Arta, 26 August–7 September)	Czech Republic	7th (Note: Competed as Czechoslovakia in 1991 and 1993; 4 appearances as Czech Republic.)	1991	2023	Third place (1993)
CEV (Europe)	2024 Men's U20 European Championship ( (Serbia) Vrnjačka Banja and (Greece) Arta, 26 August–7 September)	Bulgaria	11th	1985	2023	Champions (1991)
CEV (Europe)	2024 Men's U20 European Championship ( (Serbia) Vrnjačka Banja and (Greece) Arta, 26 August–7 September)	Italy	17th	1985	2023	Champions (2021)
CEV (Europe)	2024 Men's U20 European Championship ( (Serbia) Vrnjačka Banja and (Greece) Arta, 26 August–7 September)	Ukraine	4th	1999	2017	Ninth place (1999)
CEV (Europe)	2024 Men's U20 European Championship ( (Serbia) Vrnjačka Banja and (Greece) Arta, 26 August–7 September)	Turkey	4th	2013	2017	Sixth place (2013, 2015)
CEV (Europe)	Men's U21 FIVB World Ranking	Poland	13th	1989	2023	Champions (1997, 2003, 2017)
CSV (South America)	2024 Men's U21 South American Championship ( (Peru) Callao, 30 October–3 November)	Brazil	23rd	1977	2023	Champions (1993, 2001, 2007, 2009)
CSV (South America)	2024 Men's U21 South American Championship ( (Peru) Callao, 30 October–3 November)	Colombia	2nd	1977		Eighth place (1977)
CSV (South America)	2024 Men's U21 South American Championship ( (Peru) Callao, 30 October–3 November)	Argentina	18th	1977	2023	Runners-up (2011, 2015)
NORCECA (North, Central America and Caribbean)	2024 Men's U21 NORCECA Championship ( (Mexico) Nogales, 9–17 June)	United States	11th	1977	2023	Fourth place (2011)
NORCECA (North, Central America and Caribbean)	2024 Men's U21 NORCECA Championship ( (Mexico) Nogales, 9–17 June)	Canada	14th	1977	2023	Fifth place (1999)
NORCECA (North, Central America and Caribbean)	2024 Men's U21 NORCECA Championship ( (Mexico) Nogales, 9–17 June)	Cuba	15th	1981	2021	Runners-up (1987, 2009, 2017)
NORCECA (North, Central America and Caribbean)	2024 Men's U21 NORCECA Championship ( (Mexico) Nogales, 9–17 June)	Puerto Rico	6th	1989	2019	Ninth place (1997)

== Pools composition ==
The draw for the pools composition will held on 4 December 2024 at the FIVB headquarters in Lausanne, Switzerland. The 24 participating teams will be split into four single round-robin pools of six with the host nations and the reigning world champions receiving the highest seeds. The rest of the qualified teams are seeded in a serpentine system based on their positions in the respective FIVB World Rankings.

=== Seeding ===
Men's U21 FIVB World Ranking of each team as of 4 November 2024 are shown in brackets, except the hosts China who ranked 66th.

Seeded teams		Teams to be drawn			
Line 1	Line 2	Pot 1	Pot 2	Pot 3	Pot 4
China (Hosts, assigned to A1); Iran (1), assigned to B1; Bulgaria (2), assigned to C1; Italy (3), assigned to D1	Argentina (4), assigned to D2; Brazil (5), assigned to C2; Poland (6), assigned to B2; Egypt (7), assigned to A2	Canada (8); United States (9); Czech Republic (10); Tunisia (12)	Thailand (13); France (13); South Korea (15); Colombia (15)	Morocco (18); Japan (18); Ukraine (20); Puerto Rico (20)	Indonesia (20); Kazakhstan (26); Turkey (29); Cuba (66)

=== Draw ===
The draw procedure also followed the serpentine system and was as follows:

- Teams from pot 4 were drawn first and were placed in line 6 of each pool starting from pool D to pool A.
- Teams from pot 3 were then drawn and placed in line 5 of each pool starting from pool A to pool D.
- Teams from pot 2 were then drawn and were placed in line 4 of each pool starting from pool D to pool A.
- Teams from pot 1 were then drawn and placed in line 3 of each pool starting from pool A to pool D.

The pools composition after the draw was as follow:

Pool A
Pos	Team
A1	China
A2	Egypt
A3	United States
A4	Thailand
A5	Morocco
A6	Turkey

Pool B
Pos	Team
B1	Iran
B2	Poland
B3	Canada
B4	South Korea
B5	Puerto Rico
B6	Kazakhstan

Pool C
Pos	Team
C1	Bulgaria
C2	Brazil
C3	Czech Republic
C4	Colombia
C5	Japan
C6	Cuba

Pool D
Pos	Team
D1	Italy
D2	Argentina
D3	Tunisia
D4	France
D5	Ukraine
D6	Indonesia

== Venue ==
Jiangmen, China
Jiangmen Sports Center
Capacity: 8,500

== Competition formula changes ==
In June 2023 during a three-day meeting in Punta Cana, Dominican Republic, the FIVB Board of Administration approved the proposal made by its Volleyball Council to increase the number of participating teams to 24 in its Age Group World Championships (U19 and U21 in both genders). Consequently, the distribution of quotas by confederation for the Women's U21 World Championship was modified regarding previous editions, ensuring one automatic quota for the defending champion and assigning two quotas based on the corresponding FIVB Age Group World Ranking.

The new competition formula was in line with the one adopted for the 2023 FIVB Volleyball Boys' U19 World Championship, which was also contested by 24 teams.

=== Pool standing procedure ===
The ranking of teams in the preliminary round was established according the following criteria:

1. Total number of victories (matches won, matches lost);
2. Match points;
  - Match won 3–0 or 3–1: 3 points for the winner, 0 points for the loser
  - Match won 3–2: 2 points for the winner, 1 point for the loser
  - Match forfeited: 3 points for the winner, 0 points (0–25, 0–25, 0–25) for the loser
3. Sets ratio;
4. Points ratio;
5. If the tie continues between two teams: result of the last match between the tied teams. If the tie continues between three or more teams: a new classification would be made taking into consideration only the matches involving the teams in question.

== Squads ==
Each national team had to register a long-list roster with up to 25 players, which eventually had to be reduced to a final list of 12 players. Players born on or after 1 January 2005 were eligible to compete in the tournament.

== Preliminary round ==
- All times are China Standard Time (UTC+08:00).

=== Pool A ===
Pos	Team	Pld	W	L	Pts	SW	SL	SR	SPW	SPL	SPR	Qualification
1	United States	5	5	0	13	15	5	3.000	488	413	1.182	Round of 16
2	Egypt	5	4	1	10	14	9	1.556	516	490	1.053	Round of 16
3	China (H)	5	3	2	10	12	7	1.714	442	403	1.097	Round of 16
4	Turkey	5	2	3	8	11	9	1.222	441	429	1.028	Round of 16
5	Thailand	5	1	4	4	5	12	0.417	337	385	0.875	17th–24th places
6	Morocco	5	0	5	0	0	15	0.000	271	375	0.723	17th–24th places

Source: FIVB Men's U21 World Championship 2025 - Standings
(H) Host

Date	Time		Score		Set 1	Set 2	Set 3	Set 4	Set 5	Total	Report
21 Aug	11:00	United States	3–0	Thailand	25–20	25–15	25–19			75–54	P2 Report
21 Aug	14:00	China	3–1	Turkey	25–21	25–27	25–23	25–21		100–92	P2 Report
21 Aug	17:00	Egypt	3–0	Morocco	25–21	25–10	25–17			75–48	P2 Report
22 Aug	11:00	Egypt	3–2	Thailand	25–20	14–25	22–25	25–17	15–10	101–97	P2 Report
22 Aug	14:00	United States	3–2	Turkey	21–25	25–13	25–22	21–25	15–7	107–92	P2 Report
22 Aug	17:00	China	3–0	Morocco	25–13	25–17	25–20			75–50	P2 Report
23 Aug	11:00	Egypt	2–3	United States	24–26	33–31	35–37	25–23	10–15	127–132	P2 Report
23 Aug	14:00	Morocco	0–3	Turkey	20–25	21–25	19–25			60–75	P2 Report
23 Aug	17:00	China	3–0	Thailand	25–18	25–17	25–19			75–54	P2 Report
25 Aug	11:00	Egypt	3–2	Turkey	26–24	22–25	14–25	25–17	18–16	105–107	P2 Report
25 Aug	14:00	China	1–3	United States	26–24	21–25	21–25	18–25		86–99	P2 Report
25 Aug	17:00	Thailand	3–0	Morocco	25–19	25–19	25–21			75–59	P2 Report
26 Aug	11:00	Thailand	0–3	Turkey	18–25	17–25	22–25			57–75	P2 Report
26 Aug	14:00	United States	3–0	Morocco	25–11	25–20	25–23			75–54	P2 Report
26 Aug	17:00	China	2–3	Egypt	18–25	22–25	28–26	25–17	13–15	106–108	P2 Report

=== Pool B ===
Pos	Team	Pld	W	L	Pts	SW	SL	SR	SPW	SPL	SPR	Qualification
1	Iran	5	5	0	14	15	4	3.750	458	363	1.262	Round of 16
2	Poland	5	4	1	12	13	3	4.333	380	336	1.131	Round of 16
3	Kazakhstan	5	2	3	7	9	10	0.900	431	442	0.975	Round of 16
4	South Korea	5	2	3	6	9	12	0.750	457	458	0.998	Round of 16
5	Canada	5	2	3	6	8	11	0.727	410	430	0.953	17th–24th places
6	Puerto Rico	5	0	5	0	1	15	0.067	288	395	0.729	17th–24th places

Source: FIVB Men's U21 World Championship 2025 - Standings

Date	Time		Score		Set 1	Set 2	Set 3	Set 4	Set 5	Total	Report
21 Aug	11:00	Iran	3–1	Kazakhstan	25–19	21–25	25–23	25–17		96–84	P2 Report
21 Aug	14:00	Poland	3–0	Puerto Rico	25–15	25–22	25–22			75–59	P2 Report
21 Aug	17:00	Canada	2–3	South Korea	28–26	20–25	18–25	25–15	7–15	98–106	P2 Report
22 Aug	11:00	Iran	3–0	Puerto Rico	25–14	25–14	25–9			75–37	P2 Report
22 Aug	14:00	Poland	3–0	South Korea	25–16	25–21	25–20			75–57	P2 Report
22 Aug	17:00	Canada	3–2	Kazakhstan	34–32	23–25	22–25	25–21	15–13	119–116	P2 Report
23 Aug	11:00	Iran	3–2	South Korea	31–33	25–15	25–22	22–25	15–12	118–107	P2 Report
23 Aug	14:00	Poland	3–0	Canada	26–24	25–18	25–20			76–62	P2 Report
23 Aug	17:00	Puerto Rico	0–3	Kazakhstan	23–25	21–25	16–25			60–75	P2 Report
25 Aug	11:00	Iran	3–0	Canada	25–20	25–14	25–22			75–56	P2 Report
25 Aug	14:00	Poland	3–0	Kazakhstan	25–21	25–21	25–22			75–64	P2 Report
25 Aug	17:00	South Korea	3–1	Puerto Rico	25–17	20–25	25–16	25–17		95–75	P2 Report
26 Aug	11:00	Iran	3–1	Poland	25–18	19–25	25–17	25–19		94–79	P2 Report
26 Aug	14:00	Canada	3–0	Puerto Rico	25–21	25–18	25–18			75–57	P2 Report
26 Aug	17:00	South Korea	1–3	Kazakhstan	25–17	23–25	22–25	22–25		92–92	P2 Report

=== Pool C ===
Pos	Team	Pld	W	L	Pts	SW	SL	SR	SPW	SPL	SPR	Qualification
1	Czech Republic	5	5	0	14	15	3	5.000	433	367	1.180	Round of 16
2	Japan	5	4	1	11	13	5	2.600	426	353	1.207	Round of 16
3	Cuba	5	3	2	9	11	9	1.222	445	445	1.000	Round of 16
4	Bulgaria	5	2	3	6	9	11	0.818	421	439	0.959	Round of 16
5	Brazil	5	1	4	4	5	12	0.417	360	388	0.928	17th–24th places
6	Colombia	5	0	5	1	2	15	0.133	339	432	0.785	17th–24th places

Source: FIVB Men's U21 World Championship 2025 - Standings

Date	Time		Score		Set 1	Set 2	Set 3	Set 4	Set 5	Total	Report
21 Aug	11:00	Bulgaria	1–3	Cuba	25–16	17–25	23–25	21–25		86–91	P2 Report
21 Aug	14:00	Brazil	0–3	Japan	21–25	23–25	20–25			64–75	P2 Report
21 Aug	17:00	Czech Republic	3–0	Colombia	25–15	25–17	25–16			75–48	P2 Report
22 Aug	11:00	Bulgaria	2–3	Japan	25–22	20–25	18–25	25–23	12–15	100–110	P2 Report
22 Aug	14:00	Brazil	3–0	Colombia	25–21	27–25	25–20			77–66	P2 Report
22 Aug	17:00	Czech Republic	3–2	Cuba	18–25	25–23	26–24	24–26	15–9	108–107	P2 Report
23 Aug	11:00	Bulgaria	3–0	Colombia	31–29	25–20	25–21			81–70	P2 Report
23 Aug	14:00	Brazil	0–3	Czech Republic	21–25	20–25	23–25			64–75	P2 Report
23 Aug	17:00	Japan	3–0	Cuba	25–23	25–17	25–8			75–48	P2 Report
25 Aug	11:00	Bulgaria	0–3	Czech Republic	22–25	16–25	19–25			57–75	P2 Report
25 Aug	14:00	Brazil	0–3	Cuba	23–25	19–25	20–25			62–75	P2 Report
25 Aug	17:00	Colombia	0–3	Japan	16–25	11–25	14–25			41–75	P2 Report
26 Aug	11:00	Czech Republic	3–1	Japan	23–25	25–19	27–25	25–22		100–91	P2 Report
26 Aug	14:00	Bulgaria	3–2	Brazil	25–17	25–16	20–25	12–25	15–10	97–93	P2 Report
26 Aug	17:00	Colombia	2–3	Cuba	17–25	41–39	21–25	25–20	10–15	114–124	P2 Report

=== Pool D ===
Pos	Team	Pld	W	L	Pts	SW	SL	SR	SPW	SPL	SPR	Qualification
1	Italy	5	5	0	15	15	1	15.000	400	323	1.238	Round of 16
2	France	5	4	1	12	13	5	2.600	435	385	1.130	Round of 16
3	Ukraine	5	3	2	8	10	9	1.111	441	411	1.073	Round of 16
4	Argentina	5	2	3	5	8	11	0.727	413	439	0.941	Round of 16
5	Indonesia	5	1	4	5	7	13	0.538	430	460	0.935	17th–24th places
6	Tunisia	5	0	5	0	1	15	0.067	296	397	0.746	17th–24th places

Source: FIVB Men's U21 World Championship 2025 - Standings

Date	Time		Score		Set 1	Set 2	Set 3	Set 4	Set 5	Total	Report
21 Aug	20:00	Italy	3–0	Indonesia	25–21	25–17	25–22			75–60	P2 Report
21 Aug	20:00	Tunisia	0–3	France	20–25	17–25	16–25			53–75	P2 Report
21 Aug	20:00	Argentina	1–3	Ukraine	21–25	20–25	25–23	21–25		87–98	P2 Report
22 Aug	20:00	Argentina	1–3	France	20–25	25–22	21–25	19–25		85–97	P2 Report
22 Aug	20:00	Italy	3–0	Ukraine	25–20	25–23	28–26			78–69	P2 Report
22 Aug	20:00	Tunisia	1–3	Indonesia	25–22	21–25	18–25	19–25		83–97	P2 Report
23 Aug	20:00	Argentina	3–0	Tunisia	25–17	25–21	25–23			75–61	P2 Report
23 Aug	20:00	Ukraine	3–2	Indonesia	25–18	26–28	25–22	23–25	15–7	114–100	P2 Report
23 Aug	20:00	Italy	3–1	France	25–22	22–25	25–23	25–23		97–93	P2 Report
25 Aug	20:00	France	3–1	Ukraine	25–20	25–23	20–25	25–17		95–85	P2 Report
25 Aug	20:00	Italy	3–0	Tunisia	25–17	25–13	25–18			75–48	P2 Report
25 Aug	20:00	Argentina	3–2	Indonesia	23–25	27–25	23–25	25–20	15–13	113–108	P2 Report
26 Aug	20:00	France	3–0	Indonesia	25–23	25–21	25–21			75–65	P2 Report
26 Aug	20:00	Italy	3–0	Argentina	25–18	25–18	25–17			75–53	P2 Report
26 Aug	20:00	Tunisia	0–3	Ukraine	13–25	18–25	20–25			51–75	P2 Report

== Final round ==
- All times are China Standard Time (UTC+08:00).

=== 17th–24th places ===
21st place match
30 August
Colombia	3
Puerto Rico	1
23rd place match
30 August
Tunisia	2
Morocco	3

21st–24th semifinals
29 August
Colombia	3
Tunisia	1
29 August
Morocco	1
Puerto Rico	3

17th–24th quarterfinals
27 August
Thailand	3
Colombia	0
27 August
Canada	3
Tunisia	0
27 August
Brazil	3
Morocco	0
27 August
Indonesia	3
Puerto Rico	0

17th–20th semifinals
29 August
Thailand	2
Canada	3
29 August
Brazil	3
Indonesia	1

17th place match
30 August
Canada	3
Brazil	2
19th place match
30 August
Thailand	1
Indonesia	3

==== 17th–24th quarterfinals ====
Date	Time		Score		Set 1	Set 2	Set 3	Set 4	Set 5	Total	Report
27 Aug	11:00	Thailand	3–0	Colombia	25–21	25–21	25–16			75–58	P2 Report
27 Aug	14:00	Brazil	3–0	Morocco	25–22	27–25	25–19			77–66	P2 Report
27 Aug	17:00	Canada	3–0	Tunisia	25–10	25–18	25–18			75–46	P2 Report
27 Aug	20:00	Indonesia	3–0	Puerto Rico	25–20	25–23	25–15			75–58	P2 Report

==== 21st–24th semifinals ====
Date	Time		Score		Set 1	Set 2	Set 3	Set 4	Set 5	Total	Report
29 Aug	11:00	Colombia	3–1	Tunisia	17–25	25–20	25–11	25–18		92–74	P2 Report
29 Aug	14:00	Morocco	1–3	Puerto Rico	25–20	26–28	22–25	21–25		94–98	P2 Report

==== 17th–20th semifinals ====
Date	Time		Score		Set 1	Set 2	Set 3	Set 4	Set 5	Total	Report
29 Aug	17:00	Thailand	2–3	Canada	25–18	20–25	23–25	25–22	13–15	106–105	P2 Report
29 Aug	20:00	Brazil	3–1	Indonesia	25–20	25–27	25–19	25–22		100–88	P2 Report

==== 23rd place match ====
Date	Time		Score		Set 1	Set 2	Set 3	Set 4	Set 5	Total	Report
30 Aug	11:00	Tunisia	2–3	Morocco	25–27	26–24	23–25	25–22	12–15	111–113	P2 Report

==== 21st place match ====
Date	Time		Score		Set 1	Set 2	Set 3	Set 4	Set 5	Total	Report
30 Aug	14:00	Colombia	3–1	Puerto Rico	25–22	25–17	23–25	25–23		98–87	P2 Report

==== 19th place match ====
Date	Time		Score		Set 1	Set 2	Set 3	Set 4	Set 5	Total	Report
30 Aug	17:00	Thailand	1–3	Indonesia	23–25	13–25	25–20	27–29		88–99	P2 Report

==== 17th place match ====
Date	Time		Score		Set 1	Set 2	Set 3	Set 4	Set 5	Total	Report
30 Aug	20:00	Canada	3–2	Brazil	23–25	25–20	26–28	25–20	18–16	117–109	P2 Report

=== 1st–16th places ===
9th place match
31 August
Bulgaria	0
Ukraine	3
11th place match
31 August
Japan	3
South Korea	1
13th place match
31 August
Kazakhstan	0
Egypt	3
15th place match
31 August
Argentina	3
Turkey	1

9th–12th semifinals
30 August
Bulgaria	3
Japan	1
30 August
Ukraine	3
South Korea	1
13th–16th semifinals
30 August
Kazakhstan	3
Argentina	2
30 August
Turkey	1
Egypt	3

9th–16th quarterfinals
29 August
Bulgaria	3
Kazakhstan	2
29 August
Japan	3
Argentina	2
29 August
Ukraine	3
Turkey	1
29 August
Egypt	2
South Korea	3

Round of 16
27 August
United States	3
Bulgaria	0
27 August
France	3
Kazakhstan	0
27 August
Japan	2
China	3
27 August
Iran	3
Argentina	1
27 August
Poland	3
Ukraine	1
27 August
Czech Republic	3
Turkey	1
27 August
Egypt	0
Cuba	3
27 August
Italy	3
South Korea	0

Quarterfinals
29 August
United States	3
France	2
29 August
China	0
Iran	3
29 August
Poland	1
Czech Republic	3
29 August
Cuba	1
Italy	3

Semifinals
30 August
United States	0
Iran	3
30 August
Czech Republic	0
Italy	3
5th–8th semifinals
30 August
France	3
China	0
30 August
Poland	3
Cuba	0

Final
31 August
Iran	3
Italy	1
3rd place match
31 August
United States	3
Czech Republic	0
5th place match
31 August
France	3
Poland	1
7th place match
31 August
China	1
Cuba	3

==== Round of 16 ====
Date	Time		Score		Set 1	Set 2	Set 3	Set 4	Set 5	Total	Report
27 Aug	11:00	France	3–0	Kazakhstan	25–15	25–16	25–18			75–49	P2 Report
27 Aug	11:00	United States	3–0	Bulgaria	25–19	25–17	25–20			75–56	P2 Report
27 Aug	14:00	Iran	3–1	Argentina	22–25	25–20	25–16	25–23		97–84	P2 Report
27 Aug	14:00	Egypt	0–3	Cuba	28–30	25–27	17–25			70–82	P2 Report
27 Aug	17:00	Poland	3–1	Ukraine	25–17	16–25	25–17	25–22		91–81	P2 Report
27 Aug	17:00	Czech Republic	3–1	Turkey	23–25	25–15	25–18	25–22		98–80	P2 Report
27 Aug	20:00	Japan	2–3	China	25–17	23–25	21–25	27–25	13–15	109–107	P2 Report
27 Aug	20:00	Italy	3–0	South Korea	25–12	25–22	25–15			75–49	P2 Report

==== 9th–16th quarterfinals ====
Date	Time		Score		Set 1	Set 2	Set 3	Set 4	Set 5	Total	Report
29 Aug	11:00	Kazakhstan	2–3	Bulgaria	19–25	19–25	25–21	25–23	9–15	97–109	P2 Report
29 Aug	14:00	Ukraine	3–1	Turkey	23–25	25–21	25–21	25-18		98–67	P2 Report
29 Aug	17:00	Japan	3–2	Argentina	27–29	25–16	22–25	25–19	15–13	114–102	P2 Report
29 Aug	20:00	Egypt	2–3	South Korea	26–28	25–22	30–28	23–25	12–15	116–118	P2 Report

==== Quarterfinals ====
Date	Time		Score		Set 1	Set 2	Set 3	Set 4	Set 5	Total	Report
29 Aug	11:00	France	2–3	United States	25–21	17–25	25–22	23–25	12–15	102–108	P2 Report
29 Aug	14:00	Poland	1–3	Czech Republic	13–25	25–20	21–25	28–30		87–100	P2 Report
29 Aug	17:00	China	0–3	Iran	21–25	16–25	15–25			52–75	P2 Report
29 Aug	20:00	Cuba	1–3	Italy	18–25	25–22	18–25	21–25		82–97	P2 Report

==== 13th–16th semifinals ====
Date	Time		Score		Set 1	Set 2	Set 3	Set 4	Set 5	Total	Report
30 Aug	11:00	Kazakhstan	3–2	Argentina	26–28	25–21	18–25	26–24	15–11	110–109	P2 Report
30 Aug	14:00	Turkey	1–3	Egypt	22–25	19–25	25–20	22–25		88–95	P2 Report

==== 9th–12th semifinals ====
Date	Time		Score		Set 1	Set 2	Set 3	Set 4	Set 5	Total	Report
30 Aug	17:00	Bulgaria	3–1	Japan	25–20	12–25	25–17	25–22		87–84	P2 Report
30 Aug	20:00	Ukraine	3–1	South Korea	25–22	25–23	25–27	25–18		100–90	P2 Report

==== 5th–8th semifinals ====
Date	Time		Score		Set 1	Set 2	Set 3	Set 4	Set 5	Total	Report
30 Aug	11:00	Poland	3–0	Cuba	25–20	25–20	25–19			75–59	P2 Report
30 Aug	14:00	France	3–0	China	25–21	25–21	25–22			75–64	P2 Report

==== Semifinals ====
Date	Time		Score		Set 1	Set 2	Set 3	Set 4	Set 5	Total	Report
30 Aug	17:00	Czech Republic	0–3	Italy	20–25	22–25	18–25			60–75	P2 Report
30 Aug	20:00	United States	0–3	Iran	21–25	20–25	20–25			61–75	P2 Report

==== 15th place match ====
Date	Time		Score		Set 1	Set 2	Set 3	Set 4	Set 5	Total	Report
31 Aug	10:00	Argentina	3–1	Turkey	25–17	23–25	25–16	25–20		98–78	P2 Report

==== 13th place match ====
Date	Time		Score		Set 1	Set 2	Set 3	Set 4	Set 5	Total	Report
31 Aug	13:00	Kazakhstan	0–3	Egypt	22–25	19–25	28–30			69–80	P2 Report

==== 11th place match ====
Date	Time		Score		Set 1	Set 2	Set 3	Set 4	Set 5	Total	Report
31 Aug	16:00	Japan	3–1	South Korea	25–18	19–25	25–22	25–21		94–86	P2 Report

==== 9th place match ====
Date	Time		Score		Set 1	Set 2	Set 3	Set 4	Set 5	Total	Report
31 Aug	19:00	Bulgaria	0–3	Ukraine	23–25	21–25	23–25			67–75	P2 Report

==== 7th place match ====
Date	Time		Score		Set 1	Set 2	Set 3	Set 4	Set 5	Total	Report
31 Aug	14:00	China	1–3	Cuba	20–25	19–25	25–20	22–25		86–95	P2 Report

==== 5th place match ====
Date	Time		Score		Set 1	Set 2	Set 3	Set 4	Set 5	Total	Report
31 Aug	11:00	France	3–1	Poland	21–25	25–19	25–23	25–21		96–88	P2 Report

==== 3rd place match ====
Date	Time		Score		Set 1	Set 2	Set 3	Set 4	Set 5	Total	Report
31 Aug	17:00	United States	3–0	Czech Republic	25–20	25–19	25–18			75–57	P2 Report

==== Final ====
Date	Time		Score		Set 1	Set 2	Set 3	Set 4	Set 5	Total	Report
31 Aug	20:00	Iran	3–1	Italy	15–25	25–18	25–22	25–14		90–79	P2 Report

== Final standing ==
Rank	Team
1st place, gold medalist(s)	Iran
2nd place, silver medalist(s)	Italy
3rd place, bronze medalist(s)	United States
4	Czech Republic
5	France
6	Poland
7	Cuba
8	China
9	Ukraine
10	Bulgaria
11	Japan
12	South Korea
13	Egypt
14	Kazakhstan
15	Argentina
16	Turkey
17	Canada
18	Brazil
19	Indonesia
20	Thailand
21	Colombia
22	Puerto Rico
23	Morocco
24	Tunisia

Qualified for the 2028 World Championship

2025 Men's U21 World champions

Iran
Third title

12–man roster
Taha Behboudnia, Morteza Narimani, Emran Kook Jili, Mohammadmani AliKhani (c), Emad Kakavand, Shayan Mehrabi, Seyed Morteza Tabatabaei, Pouya Ariakhah, Ali Mombeni, Seyed Matin Hosseini, Ariyan Mahmoudi Nejad, Armin Ghelichniazi
Head coach
Gholamreza Momenimoghaddam

== Awards ==
The following individual awards was presented at the end of the tournament.

- Most valuable player
  (Iran) Seyed Matin Hosseini
- Best setter
  (Iran) Emran Kook Jili
- Best outside spikers
  (Iran) Seyed Matin Hosseini
  (United States) Sean Kelly
- Best middle blockers
  (Iran) Taha Behboudnia
  (Italy) Pardo Mati
- Best opposite spiker
  (Italy) Tommaso Barotto
- Best libero
  (Iran) Seyed Morteza Tabatabaei

== Statistics leaders ==
The statistics of leaders for each skill are recorded throughout the tournament.

Best Scorers
Rank	Player	Attacks	Blocks	Serves	Total
1	(Cuba) Daniel Martínez	185	11	29	225
2	(Argentina) Fausto Diaz	150	12	12	174
3	(Poland) Wojciech Gajek	138	23	9	170
4	(Turkey) Yılmaz Üner	143	11	12	166
5	(Egypt) Hamza Awad	132	25	4	161

Best Attackers
Rank	Player	Spikes	Faults	Shots	%	Total
1	(Cuba) Daniel Martínez	185	69	108	51.10	362
2	(Argentina) Fausto Diaz	150	36	143	45.59	329
3	(Turkey) Yılmaz Üner	143	56	115	45.54	314
4	(Czech Republic) Tomáš Brichta	139	44	92	50.55	275
5	(Poland) Wojciech Gajek	138	36	70	56.56	244

Best Blockers
Rank	Player	Blocks	Faults	Rebounds	Avg	Total
1	(Egypt) Ibrahim Abdelmaksood	43	55	37	4.78	135
2	(Iran) Taha Behboudnia	28	24	31	3.11	83
2	(Italy) Pardo Mati	28	40	33	3.11	101
2	(Argentina) Emiliano Molini	28	39	47	3.11	114
3	(China) Shi Taier	27	33	47	3.00	76
4	(Egypt) Hamza Awad	25	31	21	2.78	77
5	(Egypt) Youssef Elrassas	24	43	23	2.67	90
5	(Indonesia) Darda Mulya Muhammad	24	37	35	3.00	96

Best Servers
Rank	Player	Aces	Faults	Hits	Avg	Total
1	(Cuba) Daniel Martínez	29	32	107	3.22	168
2	(Kazakhstan) Artyom Olexenko	19	36	54	2.11	109
3	(Iran) Seyed Matin Hosseini	18	41	82	2.00	141
4	(United States) Jackson Cryst	16	32	72	1.78	120
5	(France) Amir Tizi-Oualou	15	26	96	1.67	137

Best Setters
Rank	Player	Running	Faults	Still	Avg	Total
1	(Turkey) Özgür Benzer	270	9	351	30.00	630
2	(France) Amir Tizi-Oualou	265	5	345	29.44	615
3	(Kazakhstan) Zhanibek Omar	264	3	404	29.33	671
4	(China) Geng Qi	263	5	473	29.22	741
5	(South Korea) Kim Gwan-woo	235	5	375	26.11	615

Best Diggers
Rank	Player	Digs	Faults	Receptions	Avg	Total
1	(Kazakhstan) Murojon Khavazmatov	73	21	32	8.11	126
1	(Brazil) João Pedro Centola	73	21	32	9.12	141
2	(Ukraine) Mykola Dzhul	72	40	40	8.00	152
3	(France) Enzo Lopez	71	26	43	7.89	140
4	(Turkey) Batu Akbaba	68	33	46	7.56	147
5	(China) Sun Qingsong	67	29	41	7.44	137

Best Receivers
Rank	Player	Excellents	Faults	Serve	%	Total
1	(Thailand) Nakharin Inthanu	81	9	97	43.32	187
2	(China) Wang Bohan	80	11	147	33.61	238
3	(Turkey) Yiğit Hamza Aslan	73	14	163	29.20	250
4	(Egypt) Hamza Awad	68	7	168	27.98	243
5	(Brazil) Martos Antonio Soares Neto	64	6	116	34.41	186

== See also ==
- 2025 FIVB Volleyball Women's U21 World Championship
- 2025 FIVB Volleyball Boys' U19 World Championship
- 2025 FIVB Men's Volleyball World Championship
