= FIVB Volleyball Men's U21 World Championship =

International men's junior volleyball event

- Most recent season or competition: 2025 FIVB Volleyball Men's U21 World Championship
- Sport: Volleyball
- Founded: 1977; 49 years ago
- First season: 1977
- No. of teams: 24
- Continent: International (FIVB)
- Most recent champion: Iran (3rd title)
- Most titles: Russia (6 titles)

The FIVB Volleyball Men's U21 World Championship, called the FIVB Volleyball Men's Junior World Championship between 2007 and 2011, is the world championship of volleyball for male players under the age of 21 organized by Fédération Internationale de Volleyball (FIVB).

The first edition was staged in 1977 in Brazil and tournaments have been played every four years for the first three editions and every two years since then. The most recent tournament was hosted by China in the city of Jiangmen and won by Iran.

In July 2023, FIVB announced the increase of teams from 16 to 24 and that the tournament would be staged in even-numbered years starting in 2026 in combination with the U17 World Championships, to ensure progressive participation of athletes in their respective age group categories. Subsequently, FIVB decided to discard the 2026 edition, so that after 2025 the next tournament would be in 2028 in order not to congest the calendar of the age group championships.

Russia is the most successful nation in the tournament's history, with six titles and three runners-up. Brazil is the second most successful with four titles and six runners-up.

A corresponding tournament for female players is the FIVB Volleyball Women's U21 World Championship.

== Results summary ==
#	Year	Host	Final			3rd place match			Teams
#	Year	Host	Champions	Score	Runners-up	3rd place	Score	4th place	Teams
1	1977; Details	(Brazil); Rio de Janeiro	Soviet Union	Round-robin	China	Brazil	Round-robin	Mexico	16
2	1981; Details	(United States); Denver	Soviet Union	3–0	Brazil	South Korea	3–1	China	16
3	1985; Details	(Italy); Milan	Soviet Union	3–1	Italy	Cuba	3–0	South Korea	16
4	1987; Details	(Bahrain); Manama	South Korea	3–2	Cuba	Soviet Union	3–1	West Germany	16
5	1989; Details	(Greece); Athens	Soviet Union	3–1	Japan	Brazil	3–0	Bulgaria	16
6	1991; Details	(Egypt); Cairo	Bulgaria	3–0	Italy	Soviet Union	3–0	Brazil	16
7	1993; Details	(Argentina); Rosario / Santa Fe	Brazil	3–1	Italy	Czechoslovakia	3–2	Argentina	16
8	1995; Details	(Malaysia); Johor Bahru / Kuala Lumpur	Russia	3–2	Brazil	Italy	3–1	Finland	15
9	1997; Details	(Bahrain); Manama	Poland	3–1	Brazil	Russia	3–1	Venezuela	16
10	1999; Details	(Thailand); Sisaket / Ubon Ratchathani	Russia	3–1	France	Brazil	3–0	Venezuela	16
11	2001; Details	(Poland); Wrocław	Brazil	3–0	Russia	Venezuela	3–0	Italy	16
12	2003; Details	(Iran); Tehran	Poland	3–2	Brazil	Bulgaria	3–0	South Korea	16
13	2005; Details	(India); Visakhapatnam	Russia	3–0	Brazil	Cuba	3–0	Netherlands	12
14	2007; Details	(Morocco); Casablanca / Rabat	Brazil	3–0	Russia	Iran	3–1	Italy	12
15	2009; Details	(India); Pune	Brazil	3–2	Cuba	Argentina	3–0	India	16
16	2011; Details	(Brazil); Rio de Janeiro / Niterói	Russia	3–2	Argentina	Serbia	3–1	United States	16
17	2013; Details	(Turkey); Ankara / İzmir	Russia	3–0	Brazil	Italy	3–1	France	20
18	2015; Details	(Mexico); Tijuana / Mexicali	Russia	3–2	Argentina	China	3–1	Brazil	16
19	2017; Details	(Czech Republic); Brno / České Budějovice	Poland	3–0	Cuba	Russia	3–0	Brazil	16
20	2019; Details	(Bahrain); Riffa	Iran	3–2	Italy	Brazil	3–0	Russia	16
21	2021; Details	(Italy) (Bulgaria); Cagliari / Carbonia / Sofia	Italy	3–0	Russia	Poland	3–0	Argentina	16
22	2023; Details	(Bahrain); Manama	Iran	3–2	Italy	Bulgaria	3–0	Argentina	16
23	2025; Details	(China); Jiangmen	Iran	3–1	Italy	United States	3–0	Czech Republic	24

== Medal table ==
Rank	Nation	Gold	Silver	Bronze	Total
1	Russia	6	3	2	11
2	Brazil	4	6	4	14
3	Soviet Union	4	0	2	6
4	Iran	3	0	1	4
4	Poland	3	0	1	4
6	Italy	1	6	2	9
7	Bulgaria	1	0	2	3
8	South Korea	1	0	1	2
9	Cuba	0	3	2	5
10	Argentina	0	2	1	3
11	China	0	1	1	2
12	France	0	1	0	1
12	Japan	0	1	0	1
14	Czechoslovakia	0	0	1	1
14	Serbia	0	0	1	1
14	United States	0	0	1	1
14	Venezuela	0	0	1	1
Totals (17 entries)		23	23	23	69

== Appearance ==
Legend

- 1st – Champions
- 2nd – Runners-up
- 3rd – Third place
- 4th – Fourth place
- • – Did not enter / Did not qualify
- – Hosts
- Q – Qualified for forthcoming tournament

Team	(Brazil); 1977 (16)	(United States); 1981 (16)	(Italy); 1985 (16)	(Bahrain); 1987 (16)	(Greece); 1989 (16)	(Egypt); 1991 (16)	(Argentina); 1993 (16)	(Malaysia); 1995 (15)	(Bahrain); 1997 (16)	(Thailand); 1999 (16)	(Poland); 2001 (16)	(Iran); 2003 (16)	(India); 2005 (12)	(Morocco); 2007 (12)	(India); 2009 (16)	(Brazil); 2011 (16)	(Turkey); 2013 (20)	(Mexico); 2015 (16)	(Czech Republic); 2017 (16)	(Bahrain); 2019 (16)	(Italy) (Bulgaria); 2021 (16)	(Bahrain); 2023 (16)	(China); 2025 (24)	Total
Algeria	•	•	•	14th	12th	•	•	13th	•	•	•	•	•	•	•	•	•	•	•	•	•	•	•	3
Argentina	9th	5th	11th	7th	10th	11th	4th	•	•	8th	•	•	•	5th	3rd	2nd	7th	2nd	7th	5th	4th	4th	15th	18
Bahrain	•	•	•	8th	16th	•	•	•	9th	•	•	•	•	•	•	•	•	•	•	8th	14th	15th	•	6
Belarus	Part of Soviet Union						•	•	•	•	•	•	•	•	15th	•	•	•	•	•	•	•	•	1
Belgium	•	•	•	•	•	•	•	•	•	•	•	•	•	•	6th	9th	•	•	•	•	5th	7th	•	4
Brazil	3rd	2nd	6th	6th	3rd	4th	1st	2nd	2nd	3rd	1st	2nd	2nd	1st	1st	5th	2nd	4th	4th	3rd	7th	6th	18th	23
Bulgaria	•	•	5th	5th	4th	1st	9th	•	•	•	•	3rd	•	6th	•	13th	•	•	•	•	6th	3rd	10th	11
Cameroon	•	•	•	•	•	•	•	•	•	•	•	•	•	•	•	•	•	•	•	•	16th	•	•	1
Canada	10th	13th	•	12th	•	•	•	•	•	5th	•	9th	•	•	12th	11th	12th	8th	8th	12th	10th	11th	17th	14
Chile	•	14th	12th	•	•	•	•	•	•	•	•	•	•	•	•	•	•	•	•	•	•	•	•	2
China	2nd	4th	7th	9th	8th	9th	9th	9th	9th	•	13th	13th	•	•	11th	•	15th	3rd	6th	6th	•	•	8th	17
Chinese Taipei	•	•	•	•	•	14th	13th	•	13th	13th	•	•	•	•	•	•	•	•	•	•	•	•	•	4
Colombia	8th	•	•	•	•	•	•	•	•	•	•	•	•	•	•	•	•	•	•	•	•	•	21st	2
Cuba	•	6th	3rd	2nd	5th	8th	11th	•	•	•	5th	•	3rd	8th	2nd	•	•	13th	2nd	10th	11th	•	7th	15
Czech Republic	Part of Czechoslovakia							•	•	•	•	•	•	•	•	•	•	•	15th	9th	8th	10th	4th	5
Dominican Republic	•	•	•	•	•	•	•	•	•	13th	•	•	•	•	•	•	•	•	•	•	•	•	•	1
Egypt	•	15th	16th	13th	•	12th	•	•	•	•	•	9th	•	10th	13th	15th	14th	15th	12th	13th	13th	9th	13th	15
Estonia	Part of Soviet Union						•	•	•	13th	•	•	•	•	•	•	17th	•	•	•	•	•	•	2
Finland	•	•	•	•	•	•	•	4th	•	•	•	•	•	•	•	•	•	•	•	•	•	•	•	1
France	•	•	9th	•	•	•	•	•	•	2nd	7th	•	•	•	10th	•	4th	10th	•	•	•	•	5th	7
Germany	See East Germany and West Germany					13th	13th	•	5th	•	•	8th	9th	•	•	10th	•	•	•	•	•	•	•	6
Greece	•	•	•	11th	6th	•	5th	•	•	•	13th	•	•	•	16th	•	•	•	•	•	•	•	•	5
Haiti	16th	•	•	•	•	•	•	•	•	•	•	•	•	•	•	•	•	•	•	•	•	•	•	1
India	•	11th	•	•	•	•	•	9th	•	•	•	9th	9th	•	4th	8th	8th	•	•	•	•	12th	•	8
Indonesia	•	•	•	•	15th	•	•	•	•	•	•	•	•	•	•	•	•	•	•	•	•	•	19th	2
Iran	•	•	•	•	•	•	9th	•	9th	8th	•	6th	5th	3rd	7th	6th	5th	12th	5th	1st	9th	1st	1st	15
Italy	•	•	2nd	•	9th	2nd	2nd	3rd	6th	6th	4th	13th	•	4th	•	•	3rd	5th	9th	2nd	1st	2nd	2nd	17
Japan	6th	9th	10th	10th	2nd	5th	7th	•	•	•	9th	•	•	11th	•	12th	10th	14th	13th	•	•	•	11th	14
Kazakhstan	•	•	•	•	•	•	•	•	•	•	•	•	•	•	•	•	•	•	•	•	•	•	14th	1
Latvia	Part of Soviet Union						•	•	8th	•	•	•	•	•	•	•	•	•	•	•	•	•	•	1
Malaysia	•	•	•	•	•	•	•	13th	•	•	•	•	•	•	•	•	•	•	•	•	•	•	•	1
Mexico	4th	12th	14th	•	•	•	13th	•	13th	•	•	•	•	•	•	•	16th	16th	•	•	•	14th	•	8
Morocco	•	•	•	•	•	•	•	•	•	13th	•	•	9th	12th	•	•	18th	•	16th	15th	15th	•	23rd	8
Netherlands	•	•	8th	•	•	•	•	6th	•	•	•	•	4th	•	•	•	•	•	•	•	•	•	•	3
Nigeria	•	•	•	•	•	•	•	•	13th	•	•	•	•	•	•	•	•	•	•	•	•	•	•	1
Paraguay	14th	•	•	•	•	•	•	•	•	•	•	•	•	•	•	•	•	•	•	•	•	•	•	1
Peru	15th	•	•	16th	•	•	•	•	•	•	•	•	•	•	•	•	•	•	•	•	•	•	•	2
Poland	•	•	•	•	7th	•	•	8th	1st	9th	9th	1st	•	•	9th	•	•	9th	1st	11th	3rd	5th	6th	13
Puerto Rico	•	•	•	•	14th	•	•	13th	9th	•	•	•	•	•	•	16th	•	•	•	16th	•	•	22nd	6
Russia	Part of Soviet Union						5th	1st	3rd	1st	2nd	5th	1st	2nd	5th	1st	1st	1st	3rd	4th	2nd	•	•	15
Rwanda	•	•	•	•	•	•	•	•	•	•	•	•	•	•	•	•	20th	•	•	•	•	•	•	1
Saudi Arabia	13th	16th	13th	15th	•	•	•	•	•	•	9th	•	•	•	•	•	•	•	•	•	•	•	•	5
Serbia	Part of Yugoslavia						Part of FRY / SCG							•	•	3rd	9th	•	•	•	•	•	•	2
Slovakia	Part of Czechoslovakia							•	•	•	9th	9th	•	•	•	•	•	•	•	•	•	•	•	2
Slovenia	Part of Yugoslavia						•	•	•	•	•	•	•	9th	•	•	•	7th	•	•	•	•	•	2
South Korea	5th	3rd	4th	1st	11th	6th	5th	9th	•	7th	6th	4th	6th	•	•	•	•	•	•	7th	•	•	12th	14
Spain	11th	10th	•	•	13th	•	13th	7th	•	•	•	•	•	•	•	7th	•	•	•	•	•	•	•	6
Thailand	•	•	•	•	•	•	•	•	•	9th	•	•	•	•	•	•	•	•	•	•	12th	8th	20th	4
Tunisia	•	•	15th	•	•	15th	11th	•	13th	9th	13th	13th	9th	•	14th	14th	13th	•	•	14th	•	16th	24th	14
Turkey	•	•	•	•	•	•	•	•	•	•	•	•	•	•	•	•	6th	6th	10th	•	•	•	16th	4
United States	7th	7th	•	•	•	•	•	•	•	•	•	•	8th	7th	8th	4th	11th	11th	14th	•	•	13th	3rd	11
Ukraine	Part of Soviet Union						•	•	•	9th	13th	•	•	•	•	•	•	•	11th	•	•	•	9th	4
Venezuela	11th	•	•	•	•	16th	7th	9th	4th	4th	3rd	13th	•	•	•	•	19th	•	•	•	•	•	•	9
Discontinued nations
Czechoslovakia	•	•	•	•	•	7th	3rd	See Czech Republic and Slovakia																2
FR Yugoslavia / Serbia and Montenegro	Part of Yugoslavia						•	•	7th	•	•	7th	7th	See Serbia and Montenegro										3
Soviet Union	1st	1st	1st	3rd	1st	3rd	See Russia etc.																	6
West Germany	•	8th	•	4th	•	See Germany																		2
Yugoslavia	•	•	•	•	•	10th	See FRY / SCG etc.							See Serbia etc.										1

== Most valuable player by edition ==
- 1977–93 – Not awarded
- 1995 – Gilberto Godoy Filho (BRA)
- 1997 – Not awarded
- 1999 – Pavel Abramov (RUS)
- 2001 – Ernardo Gómez (VEN)
- 2003 – Not awarded
- 2005 – Thiago Alves (BRA)
- 2007 – Deivid Costa (BRA)
- 2009 – Maurício Borges Silva (BRA)
- 2011 – Leonid Shchadilov (RUS)
- 2013 – Viktor Poletaev (RUS)
- 2015 – Pavel Pankov (RUS)
- 2017 – Jakub Kochanowski (POL)
- 2019 – Amirhossein Esfandiar (IRI)
- 2021 – Alessandro Michieletto (ITA)
- 2023 – Amir Mohammad Golzadeh (IRI)
- 2025 – Seyed Matin Hosseini (IRI)

== See also ==
- FIVB Volleyball Women's U21 World Championship
- FIVB Volleyball Men's World Championship
- FIVB Volleyball Men's U23 World Championship
- FIVB Volleyball Boys' U19 World Championship
- FIVB Volleyball Boys' U17 World Championship
