= CEV U20 Volleyball European Championship =

International men's junior volleyball event

- Current season, competition or edition: 2024 Men's U20 Volleyball European Championship
- Sport: Volleyball
- Founded: 1966; 60 years ago
- First season: 1966
- No. of teams: 16
- Continent: Europe (CEV)
- Most recent champions: France (2nd title)
- Most titles: Soviet Union (11 titles)
- Website: cev.eu

The Men's Junior European Volleyball Championship is a volleyball competition for men's national teams with players under the age of 20 years, currently held biannually and organized by the European Volleyball Confederation, the confederation for Europe.

== Results summary ==
Year	Host	Final			3rd place match			Teams
Year	Host	Champions	Score	Runners-up	3rd place	Score	4th place	Teams
1966; Details	Hungary	Soviet Union	Round-robin	Bulgaria	Czechoslovakia	Round-robin	France	16
1969; Details	Soviet Union	Soviet Union	Round-robin	Bulgaria	Romania	Round-robin	Italy	17
1971; Details	Spain	Soviet Union	Round-robin	Poland	Bulgaria	Round-robin	East Germany	13
1973; Details	Netherlands	Soviet Union	Round-robin	Czechoslovakia	Poland	Round-robin	Italy	21
1975; Details	West Germany	Soviet Union	Round-robin	Czechoslovakia	Poland	Round-robin	East Germany	12
1977; Details	France	Soviet Union	3–0	Czechoslovakia	East Germany	3–1	Poland	12
1979; Details	Portugal	Soviet Union	Round-robin	Bulgaria	East Germany	Round-robin	Czechoslovakia	12
1982; Details	West Germany	Soviet Union	Round-robin	West Germany	East Germany	Round-robin	Bulgaria	12
1984; Details	France	Soviet Union	Round-robin	Bulgaria	Italy	Round-robin	France	12
1986; Details	Bulgaria	Bulgaria	Round-robin	Romania	West Germany	Round-robin	Soviet Union	12
1988; Details	Italy	Soviet Union	3–2	Italy	Bulgaria	3–1	Poland	12
1990; Details	West Germany	Soviet Union	3–0	Italy	West Germany	3–0	Czechoslovakia	12
1992; Details	Poland	Italy	3–1	Spain	CIS	3–1	Czechoslovakia	12
1994; Details	Turkey	Russia	3–0	France	Italy	3–0	Turkey	12
1996; Details	Israel	Poland	3–1	Italy	Russia	3–0	Netherlands	12
1998; Details	Czech Republic	Russia	3–0	France	Czech Republic	3–2	Poland	12
2000; Details	Italy	Russia	3–2	Italy	France	3–0	FR Yugoslavia	12
2002; Details	Poland	Italy	3–1	France	Germany	3–2	Russia	12
2004; Details	Croatia	Russia	3–1	Netherlands	Germany	3–1	Serbia and Montenegro	12
2006; Details	Russia	Russia	3–0	France	Italy	3–0	Slovenia	12
2008; Details	Czech Republic	France	3–1	Germany	Russia	3–1	Netherlands	12
2010; Details	Belarus	Russia	3–1	Bulgaria	Serbia	3–2	Netherlands	12
2012; Details	Denmark / Poland	Italy	3–1	Spain	Belgium	3–2	Turkey	12
2014; Details	Czech Republic / Slovakia	Russia	3–0	Poland	France	3–0	Slovenia	12
2016; Details	Bulgaria	Poland	3–1	Ukraine	Russia	3–1	Italy	12
2018; Details	Netherlands / Belgium	Russia	3–2	Czech Republic	Belgium	3–0	Netherlands	12
2020; Details	Czech Republic	Russia	3–1	Italy	Belgium	3–0	Belarus	10
2022; Details	Italy	Italy	3–2	Poland	Bulgaria	3–1	Belgium	12
2024; Details	Greece / Serbia	France	3–1	Bulgaria	Czech Republic	3–1	Ukraine	16
2027; Details	Croatia / Montenegro		–			–		16

== Medal summary ==
Rank	Nation	Gold	Silver	Bronze	Total
1	Soviet Union	11	0	0	11
2	Russia	9	0	3	12
3	Italy	4	5	3	12
4	France	2	4	2	8
5	Poland	2	3	2	7
6	Bulgaria	1	6	3	10
7	Czechoslovakia	0	3	1	4
8	Spain	0	2	0	2
9	Czech Republic	0	1	2	3
9	Germany	0	1	2	3
9	West Germany	0	1	2	3
12	Romania	0	1	1	2
13	Netherlands	0	1	0	1
13	Ukraine	0	1	0	1
15	Belgium	0	0	3	3
15	East Germany	0	0	3	3
17	CIS	0	0	1	1
17	Serbia	0	0	1	1
Totals (18 entries)		29	29	29	87
