= 2017 FIVB Volleyball Men's U21 World Championship =

2017 Men's U21 World Championship
Tournament details
- Host country: Czech Republic
- Dates: 23 June – 2 July
- Teams: 16 (from 5 confederations)
- Venue: 2 (in 2 host cities)

Final positions
- Champions: Poland (3rd title)
- Runners-up: Cuba
- Third place: Russia
- Fourth place: Brazil

Tournament awards
- MVP: (Poland) Jakub Kochanowski
- Best Setter: (Poland) Łukasz Kozub
- Best OH: (Poland) Bartosz Kwolek (Russia) Anton Semyshev
- Best MB: (Russia) Aleksei Kononov (Cuba) José Masso
- Best OPP: (Cuba) Miguel Gutiérrez
- Best Libero: (Brazil) Maique Nascimento

The 2017 FIVB Volleyball Men's U21 World Championship was the nineteenth edition of the FIVB Volleyball Men's U21 World Championship, contested by the men's national teams under the age of 21 of the members of the FIVB, the sport's global governing body. The tournament was held in Brno and České Budějovice, Czech Republic from 23 June to 2 July 2017. 16 teams participated.

Players must be born on or after 1 January 1997.

Poland defeated Cuba in the final to capture their third title in the competition. Russia, which won the previously three editions of the tournament, won the bronze medal after defeating Brazil in the 3rd place match. Jakub Kochanowski from Poland was elected the MVP.

== Qualification ==
The FIVB Sports Events Council revealed a proposal to streamline the number of teams participating in the Age Group World Championships.

Means of qualification		Date	Venue	Vacancies	Qualifier
Host Country		2 February 2016	(Switzerland) Lausanne	1	Czech Republic
2016 NORCECA Championship		5–10 July 2016	(Canada) Gatineau	1	United States
2016 Asian Championship		9–17 July 2016	(Taiwan) Kaohsiung	2	China
2016 Asian Championship		9–17 July 2016	(Taiwan) Kaohsiung	2	Iran
2016 African Championship		22–23 September 2016	(Morocco) Casablanca	1	Egypt
2016 South American Championship		17–24 October 2016	(Argentina) Bariloche	1	Argentina
2017 Pan-American Cup	for CSV	16–21 May 2017	(Canada) Fort McMurray	1	Brazil
2017 Pan-American Cup	for NORCECA	16–21 May 2017	(Canada) Fort McMurray	1	Cuba
European Qualifier	Pool E	18–20 May 2017	(Serbia) Požarevac	1	Ukraine
European Qualifier	Pool F	19–21 May 2017	(Germany) Berlin	1	Poland
World Ranking		January 2017	(Switzerland) Lausanne	6	Russia
World Ranking		January 2017	(Switzerland) Lausanne	6	Italy
World Ranking		January 2017	(Switzerland) Lausanne	6	Turkey
World Ranking		January 2017	(Switzerland) Lausanne	6	Canada
World Ranking		January 2017	(Switzerland) Lausanne	6	Japan
World Ranking		January 2017	(Switzerland) Lausanne	6	Morocco
Total				16	

== Pools composition ==
=== First round ===
Teams were seeded in the first two positions of each pool following the serpentine system according to their FIVB U21 World Ranking as of January 2017. FIVB reserved the right to seed the hosts as head of pool A regardless of the U21 World Ranking. All teams not seeded were drawn to take other available positions in the remaining lines, following the U21 World Ranking. The draw was held in Brno, Czech Republic on 31 May 2017. Rankings are shown in brackets except the hosts who ranked 35th.

Seeded teams		Pot 1	Pot 2
Czech Republic (Hosts); Russia (1); Argentina (2); China (3)	Brazil (4); Italy (5); Turkey (6); Poland (7)	Canada (8); United States (9); Iran (11); Egypt (11)	Cuba (13); Japan (14); Morocco (15); Ukraine (15)

Draw

Pool A	Pool B	Pool C	Pool D
Czech Republic	Russia	Argentina	China
Poland	Turkey	Italy	Brazil
Canada	United States	Iran	Egypt
Morocco	Cuba	Ukraine	Japan

=== Second round ===
Final eight				9th–16th places			
Pool E		Pool F		Pool G		Pool H	
1A	Poland	1B	Russia	3A	Czech Republic	3B	Turkey
1C	Iran	1D	Brazil	3C	Italy	3D	Japan
2B	Cuba	2A	Canada	4B	United States	4A	Morocco
2D	China	2C	Argentina	4D	Egypt	4C	Ukraine

== Venues ==
Pool A, B, E, F, 5th–8th places and Final four	Pool C, D, G, H, 13th–16th places and 9th–12th places
Brno, Czech Republic	České Budějovice, Czech Republic
DRFG Arena	Budvar Arena
Capacity: 7,700	Capacity: 6,421

== Pool standing procedure ==
1. Number of matches won
2. Match points
3. Sets ratio
4. Points ratio
5. If the tie continues as per the point ratio between two teams, the priority will be given to the team which won the last match between them. When the tie in points ratio is between three or more teams, a new classification of these teams in the terms of points 1, 2 and 3 will be made taking into consideration only the matches in which they were opposed to each other.

Match won 3–0 or 3–1: 3 match points for the winner, 0 match points for the loser
Match won 3–2: 2 match points for the winner, 1 match point for the loser

== First round ==
- All times are Central European Summer Time (UTC+02:00).

=== Pool A ===
Pos	Team	Pld	W	L	Pts	SW	SL	SR	SPW	SPL	SPR	Qualification
1	Poland	3	3	0	9	9	0	MAX	235	174	1.351	Final eight (Pools E and F)
2	Canada	3	2	1	5	6	5	1.200	248	245	1.012	Final eight (Pools E and F)
3	Czech Republic	3	1	2	4	5	6	0.833	240	235	1.021	9th–16th places (Pools G and H)
4	Morocco	3	0	3	0	0	9	0.000	156	225	0.693	9th–16th places (Pools G and H)

Date	Time		Score		Set 1	Set 2	Set 3	Set 4	Set 5	Total	Report
23 Jun	12:30	Poland	3–0	Morocco	25–9	25–15	25–15			75–39	P2 P3
23 Jun	17:30	Czech Republic	2–3	Canada	22–25	25–13	25–23	18–25	12–15	102–101	P2 P3
24 Jun	12:30	Canada	3–0	Morocco	25–23	25–16	25–23			75–62	P2 P3
24 Jun	17:30	Poland	3–0	Czech Republic	29–27	25–23	25–13			79–63	P2 P3
25 Jun	12:30	Poland	3–0	Canada	31–29	25–23	25–20			81–72	P2 P3
25 Jun	17:55	Czech Republic	3–0	Morocco	25–16	25–21	25–18			75–55	P2 P3

=== Pool B ===
Pos	Team	Pld	W	L	Pts	SW	SL	SR	SPW	SPL	SPR	Qualification
1	Russia	3	3	0	9	9	0	MAX	232	181	1.282	Final eight (Pools E and F)
2	Cuba	3	2	1	5	6	5	1.200	246	242	1.017	Final eight (Pools E and F)
3	Turkey	3	1	2	4	5	6	0.833	235	246	0.955	9th–16th places (Pools G and H)
4	United States	3	0	3	0	0	9	0.000	186	230	0.809	9th–16th places (Pools G and H)

Date	Time		Score		Set 1	Set 2	Set 3	Set 4	Set 5	Total	Report
23 Jun	15:00	Russia	3–0	Cuba	32–30	25–17	25–14			82–61	P2 P3
23 Jun	20:30	Turkey	3–0	United States	25–19	25–14	30–28			80–61	P2 P3
24 Jun	15:00	United States	0–3	Cuba	23–25	19–25	20–25			62–75	P2 P3
24 Jun	20:00	Russia	3–0	Turkey	25–19	25–20	25–18			75–57	P2 P3
25 Jun	15:00	Turkey	2–3	Cuba	21–25	25–23	25–22	20–25	7–15	98–110	P2 P3
25 Jun	20:00	Russia	3–0	United States	25–20	25–21	25–22			75–63	P2 P3

=== Pool C ===
Pos	Team	Pld	W	L	Pts	SW	SL	SR	SPW	SPL	SPR	Qualification
1	Iran	3	3	0	7	9	4	2.250	289	268	1.078	Final eight (Pools E and F)
2	Argentina	3	2	1	7	8	4	2.000	274	258	1.062	Final eight (Pools E and F)
3	Italy	3	1	2	2	4	8	0.500	260	264	0.985	9th–16th places (Pools G and H)
4	Ukraine	3	0	3	2	4	9	0.444	253	286	0.885	9th–16th places (Pools G and H)

Date	Time		Score		Set 1	Set 2	Set 3	Set 4	Set 5	Total	Report
23 Jun	12:30	Argentina	3–0	Ukraine	25–21	25–16	25–20			75–57	P2 P3
23 Jun	17:30	Italy	0–3	Iran	22–25	19–25	21–25			62–75	P2 P3
24 Jun	12:30	Iran	3–2	Ukraine	25–19	25–21	23–25	20–25	15–13	108–103	P2 P3
24 Jun	17:55	Argentina	3–1	Italy	32–30	25–19	14–25	25–21		96–95	P2 P3
25 Jun	12:30	Italy	3–2	Ukraine	25–22	15–25	23–25	25–13	15–8	103–93	P2 P3
25 Jun	17:30	Argentina	2–3	Iran	21–25	20–25	25–23	25–18	12–15	103–106	P2 P3

=== Pool D ===
Pos	Team	Pld	W	L	Pts	SW	SL	SR	SPW	SPL	SPR	Qualification
1	Brazil	3	3	0	9	9	0	MAX	225	173	1.301	Final eight (Pools E and F)
2	China	3	2	1	6	6	5	1.200	247	231	1.069	Final eight (Pools E and F)
3	Japan	3	1	2	3	4	7	0.571	244	263	0.928	9th–16th places (Pools G and H)
4	Egypt	3	0	3	0	2	9	0.222	218	267	0.816	9th–16th places (Pools G and H)

Date	Time		Score		Set 1	Set 2	Set 3	Set 4	Set 5	Total	Report
23 Jun	15:00	China	3–1	Japan	25–21	25–23	22–25	25–16		97–85	P2 P3
23 Jun	20:00	Brazil	3–0	Egypt	25–20	25–18	25–18			75–56	P2 P3
24 Jun	15:25	Egypt	1–3	Japan	17–25	25–17	26–28	23–25		91–95	P2 P3
24 Jun	20:30	China	0–3	Brazil	16–25	21–25	16–25			53–75	P2 P3
25 Jun	15:10	Brazil	3–0	Japan	25–23	25–20	25–21			75–64	P2 P3
25 Jun	20:35	China	3–1	Egypt	25–15	22–25	25–18	25–13		97–71	P2 P3

== Second round ==
- All times are Central European Summer Time (UTC+02:00).

=== Pool E ===
Pos	Team	Pld	W	L	Pts	SW	SL	SR	SPW	SPL	SPR	Qualification
1	Poland	3	3	0	7	9	4	2.250	293	254	1.154	Semifinals
2	Cuba	3	2	1	5	6	6	1.000	257	273	0.941	Semifinals
3	Iran	3	1	2	4	7	8	0.875	318	310	1.026	5th–8th semifinals
4	China	3	0	3	2	5	9	0.556	285	316	0.902	5th–8th semifinals

Date	Time		Score		Set 1	Set 2	Set 3	Set 4	Set 5	Total	Report
27 Jun	12:30	Poland	3–2	China	25–13	18–25	23–25	25–18	15–8	106–89	P2 P3
27 Jun	17:55	Cuba	3–2	Iran	25–22	25–23	19–25	13–25	15–8	97–103	P2 P3
28 Jun	12:30	Iran	3–2	China	25–17	23–25	26–24	20–25	15–10	109–101	P2 P3
28 Jun	17:45	Poland	3–0	Cuba	25–17	25–22	25–20			75–59	P2 P3
29 Jun	12:30	Cuba	3–1	China	25–21	25–23	24–26	27–25		101–95	P2 P3
29 Jun	18:10	Poland	3–2	Iran	27–29	25–21	20–25	25–20	15–11	112–106	P2 P3

=== Pool F ===
Pos	Team	Pld	W	L	Pts	SW	SL	SR	SPW	SPL	SPR	Qualification
1	Russia	3	3	0	8	9	4	2.250	317	286	1.108	Semifinals
2	Brazil	3	2	1	7	8	4	2.000	282	257	1.097	Semifinals
3	Canada	3	1	2	2	5	8	0.625	275	302	0.911	5th–8th semifinals
4	Argentina	3	0	3	1	3	9	0.333	257	286	0.899	5th–8th semifinals

Date	Time		Score		Set 1	Set 2	Set 3	Set 4	Set 5	Total	Report
27 Jun	15:10	Russia	3–1	Argentina	25–23	25–15	27–29	25–19		102–86	P2 P3
27 Jun	20:40	Canada	1–3	Brazil	15–25	25–19	23–25	16–25		79–94	P2 P3
28 Jun	15:35	Brazil	3–0	Argentina	25–20	25–23	25–23			75–66	P2 P3
28 Jun	20:00	Russia	3–1	Canada	28–26	25–27	25–21	25–13		103–87	P2 P3
29 Jun	15:10	Canada	3–2	Argentina	23–25	21–25	25–22	25–22	15–11	109–105	P2 P3
29 Jun	21:10	Russia	3–2	Brazil	25–20	21–25	30–28	19–25	17–15	112–113	P2 P3

=== Pool G ===
Pos	Team	Pld	W	L	Pts	SW	SL	SR	SPW	SPL	SPR	Qualification
1	Italy	3	3	0	8	9	2	4.500	265	226	1.173	9th–12th semifinals
2	Egypt	3	2	1	6	6	4	1.500	234	224	1.045	9th–12th semifinals
3	United States	3	1	2	2	4	8	0.500	261	272	0.960	13th–16th semifinals
4	Czech Republic	3	0	3	2	4	9	0.444	261	299	0.873	13th–16th semifinals

Date	Time		Score		Set 1	Set 2	Set 3	Set 4	Set 5	Total	Report
27 Jun	12:30	United States	0–3	Italy	23–25	21–25	23–25			67–75	P2 P3
27 Jun	17:30	Czech Republic	0–3	Egypt	19–25	23–25	22–25			64–75	P2 P3
28 Jun	12:30	Italy	3–0	Egypt	26–24	25–20	25–17			76–61	P2 P3
28 Jun	17:40	Czech Republic	2–3	United States	23–25	26–24	25–21	18–25	7–15	99–110	P2 P3
29 Jun	12:30	United States	1–3	Egypt	22–25	25–23	18–25	19–25		84–98	P2 P3
29 Jun	17:30	Czech Republic	2–3	Italy	25–23	14–25	25–23	18–25	16–18	98–114	P2 P3

=== Pool H ===
Pos	Team	Pld	W	L	Pts	SW	SL	SR	SPW	SPL	SPR	Qualification
1	Turkey	3	2	1	6	7	4	1.750	257	242	1.062	9th–12th semifinals
2	Ukraine	3	2	1	6	7	4	1.750	256	244	1.049	9th–12th semifinals
3	Japan	3	2	1	6	7	5	1.400	279	272	1.026	13th–16th semifinals
4	Morocco	3	0	3	0	1	9	0.111	213	247	0.862	13th–16th semifinals

Date	Time		Score		Set 1	Set 2	Set 3	Set 4	Set 5	Total	Report
27 Jun	15:00	Turkey	3–1	Ukraine	19–25	25–20	25–17	25–20		94–82	P2 P3
27 Jun	20:00	Morocco	1–3	Japan	19–25	20–25	25–22	21–25		85–97	P2 P3
28 Jun	15:00	Japan	1–3	Ukraine	23–25	14–25	26–24	21–25		84–99	P2 P3
28 Jun	20:30	Turkey	3–0	Morocco	25–21	25–23	25–18			75–62	P2 P3
29 Jun	15:05	Morocco	0–3	Ukraine	21–25	22–25	23–25			66–75	P2 P3
29 Jun	20:15	Turkey	1–3	Japan	21–25	22–25	25–23	20–25		88–98	P2 P3

== Final round ==
- All times are Central European Summer Time (UTC+02:00).

=== 13th–16th places ===
13th–16th semifinals
1 July
United States	3
Morocco	0
1 July
Japan	3
Czech Republic	2

13th place match
2 July
United States	1
Japan	3
15th place match
2 July
Morocco	1
Czech Republic	3

==== 13th–16th semifinals ====
Date	Time		Score		Set 1	Set 2	Set 3	Set 4	Set 5	Total	Report
1 Jul	12:30	United States	3–0	Morocco	25–18	25–23	25–21			75–62	P2 P3
1 Jul	15:00	Japan	3–2	Czech Republic	22–25	20–25	25–21	25–15	15–13	107–99	P2 P3

==== 15th place match ====
Date	Time		Score		Set 1	Set 2	Set 3	Set 4	Set 5	Total	Report
2 Jul	10:00	Morocco	1–3	Czech Republic	25–19	23–25	19–25	20–25		87–94	P2 P3

==== 13th place match ====
Date	Time		Score		Set 1	Set 2	Set 3	Set 4	Set 5	Total	Report
2 Jul	12:30	United States	1–3	Japan	25–23	23–25	15–25	20–25		83–98	P2 P3

=== 9th–12th places ===
9th–12th semifinals
1 July
Turkey	3
Egypt	1
1 July
Italy	3
Ukraine	0

9th place match
2 July
Turkey	0
Italy	3
11th place match
2 July
Egypt	2
Ukraine	3

==== 9th–12th semifinals ====
Date	Time		Score		Set 1	Set 2	Set 3	Set 4	Set 5	Total	Report
1 Jul	17:50	Turkey	3–1	Egypt	25–21	20–25	28–26	31–29		104–101	P2 P3
1 Jul	20:30	Italy	3–0	Ukraine	25–18	25–14	25–18			75–50	P2 P3

==== 11th place match ====
Date	Time		Score		Set 1	Set 2	Set 3	Set 4	Set 5	Total	Report
2 Jul	15:00	Egypt	2–3	Ukraine	24–26	22–25	25–22	25–21	11–15	107–109	P2 P3

==== 9th place match ====
Date	Time		Score		Set 1	Set 2	Set 3	Set 4	Set 5	Total	Report
2 Jul	17:45	Turkey	0–3	Italy	23–25	20–25	19–25			62–75	P2 P3

=== 5th–8th places ===
5th–8th semifinals
1 July
Iran	3
Argentina	2
1 July
Canada	2
China	3

5th place match
2 July
Iran	3
China	0
7th place match
2 July
Argentina	3
Canada	2

==== 5th–8th semifinals ====
Date	Time		Score		Set 1	Set 2	Set 3	Set 4	Set 5	Total	Report
1 Jul	12:30	Iran	3–2	Argentina	25–23	15–25	18–25	25–22	15–10	98–105	P2 P3
1 Jul	15:30	Canada	2–3	China	27–25	24–26	25–21	26–28	9–15	111–115	P2 P3

==== 7th place match ====
Date	Time		Score		Set 1	Set 2	Set 3	Set 4	Set 5	Total	Report
2 Jul	11:00	Argentina	3–2	Canada	22–25	30–28	25–20	20–25	15–11	112–109	P2 P3

==== 5th place match ====
Date	Time		Score		Set 1	Set 2	Set 3	Set 4	Set 5	Total	Report
2 Jul	14:00	Iran	3–0	China	25–19	25–20	25–21			75–60	P2 P3

=== Final four ===
Semifinals
1 July
Russia	1
Cuba	3
1 July
Poland	3
Brazil	2

Final
2 July
Cuba	0
Poland	3
3rd place match
2 July
Russia	3
Brazil	0

==== Semifinals ====
Date	Time		Score		Set 1	Set 2	Set 3	Set 4	Set 5	Total	Report
1 Jul	18:30	Russia	1–3	Cuba	15–25	18–25	25–16	23–25		81–91	P2 P3
1 Jul	20:55	Poland	3–2	Brazil	25–21	25–19	21–25	23–25	15–12	109–102	P2 P3

==== 3rd place match ====
Date	Time		Score		Set 1	Set 2	Set 3	Set 4	Set 5	Total	Report
2 Jul	16:00	Russia	3–0	Brazil	25–16	25–16	25–19			75–51	P2 P3

==== Final ====
Date	Time		Score		Set 1	Set 2	Set 3	Set 4	Set 5	Total	Report
2 Jul	18:30	Cuba	0–3	Poland	20–25	10–25	19–25			49–75	P2 P3

== Final standing ==
Rank	Team
1st place, gold medalist(s)	Poland
2nd place, silver medalist(s)	Cuba
3rd place, bronze medalist(s)	Russia
4	Brazil
5	Iran
6	China
7	Argentina
8	Canada
9	Italy
10	Turkey
11	Ukraine
12	Egypt
13	Japan
14	United States
15	Czech Republic
16	Morocco

2017 Men's U21 World champions

Poland
3rd title

12–man roster
Bartosz Kwolek, Jakub Kochanowski (c), Łukasz Kozub, Radosław Gil, Szymon Jakubiszak, Jędrzej Gruszczyński, Jakub Ziobrowski, Damian Domagała, Mateusz Masłowski, Norbert Huber, Jarosław Mucha, Tomasz Fornal
Head coach
Sebastian Pawlik

== Awards ==
- Most valuable player
  (Poland) Jakub Kochanowski
- Best setter
  (Poland) Łukasz Kozub
- Best outside spikers
  (Poland) Bartosz Kwolek
  (Russia) Anton Semyshev
- Best middle blockers
  (Russia) Aleksei Kononov
  (Cuba) José Masso
- Best opposite spiker
  (Cuba) Miguel Gutiérrez
- Best libero
  (Brazil) Maique Nascimento

== See also ==
- 2017 FIVB Volleyball Women's U20 World Championship
