= 2003 FIVB Volleyball Men's U21 World Championship =

2003 Men's U21 World Championship
Tournament details
- Host country: Iran
- Dates: 23–31 August
- Teams: 16
- Venues: 2 (in 1 host city)

Final positions
- Champions: Poland (2nd title)

The 2003 FIVB Volleyball Men's U21 World Championship was the 12th edition of the FIVB Volleyball Men's U21 World Championship. It was held in Tehran, Iran from August 23 to 31, 2003.

== Qualification ==
Means of qualification	Vacancies	Qualified
Host country	1	Iran
2002 NORCECA U21 Championship	1	Canada
2002 South American U21 Championship	2	Brazil
2002 South American U21 Championship	2	Venezuela
2002 European U21 Championship	1	Italy
2002 Asian U21 Championship	3	China
2002 Asian U21 Championship	3	South Korea
2002 Asian U21 Championship	3	India
2002 African U21 Championship	2	Egypt
2002 African U21 Championship	2	Tunisia
European Qualifier	6	Bulgaria
European Qualifier	6	Germany
European Qualifier	6	Russia
European Qualifier	6	Poland
European Qualifier	6	Serbia and Montenegro
European Qualifier	6	Slovakia
Total	16	

== First round ==
- All times are Iran Daylight Time (UTC+04:30)

=== Pool A ===
Pos	Team	Pld	W	L	Pts	SW	SL	SR	SPW	SPL	SPR	Qualification
1	South Korea	3	3	0	6	9	3	3.000	283	268	1.056	Second round
2	Iran	3	2	1	5	7	5	1.400	287	250	1.148	Second round
3	Egypt	3	1	2	4	4	8	0.500	239	271	0.882	Second round
4	Venezuela	3	0	3	3	5	9	0.556	296	316	0.937	

Date	Time		Score		Set 1	Set 2	Set 3	Set 4	Set 5	Total	Report
Aug 23	08:00	Egypt	3–2	Venezuela	25–21	22–25	20–25	25-19	15-11	107–71	P2
Aug 23	18:00	Iran	1–3	South Korea	26–28	25–16	23–25	23–25		97–94	P2
Aug 24	15:00	South Korea	3–2	Venezuela	19–25	28–26	25–20	23–25	19–17	114–113	P2
Aug 24	17:30	Egypt	1–3	Iran	15–25	17–25	25–20	17–25		74–95	P2
Aug 25	10:00	South Korea	3–0	Egypt	25–16	25–20	25–22			75–58	P2
Aug 25	17:00	Iran	3–1	Venezuela	20–25	25–19	25–18	25-20		95–62	P2

=== Pool B ===
Pos	Team	Pld	W	L	Pts	SW	SL	SR	SPW	SPL	SPR	Qualification
1	Russia	3	3	0	6	9	0	MAX	225	161	1.398	Second round
2	Germany	3	2	1	5	6	3	2.000	207	184	1.125	Second round
3	India	3	1	2	4	3	6	0.500	178	211	0.844	Second round
4	China	3	0	3	3	0	9	0.000	171	225	0.760	

Date	Time		Score		Set 1	Set 2	Set 3	Set 4	Set 5	Total	Report
Aug 23	10:00	India	0–3	Germany	23–25	15–25	13–25			51–75	P2
Aug 23	14:00	Russia	3–0	China	25-17	25–17	25–17			75–34	P2
Aug 24	19:15	China	0–3	Germany	22–25	21–25	15–25			58–75	P2
Aug 24	19:40	Russia	3–0	India	25–23	25–15	25–14			75–52	P2
Aug 25	17:15	Germany	0–3	Russia	19–25	16–25	22–25			57–75	P2
Aug 25	19:15	India	3–0	China	25–17	25–22	25–22			75–61	P2

=== Pool C ===
Pos	Team	Pld	W	L	Pts	SW	SL	SR	SPW	SPL	SPR	Qualification
1	Brazil	3	3	0	6	9	1	9.000	253	205	1.234	Second round
2	Poland	3	2	1	5	6	4	1.500	243	222	1.095	Second round
3	Canada	3	1	2	4	5	7	0.714	263	270	0.974	Second round
4	Tunisia	3	0	3	3	1	9	0.111	184	247	0.745	

Date	Time		Score		Set 1	Set 2	Set 3	Set 4	Set 5	Total	Report
Aug 23	10:00	Tunisia	1–3	Canada	12–25	21–25	25–22	12–25		70–97	P2
Aug 23	20:20	Brazil	3–0	Poland	25–21	30–28	25–17			80–66	P2
Aug 24	10:00	Brazil	3–1	Canada	25–16	22–25	26–24	25–18		98–83	P2
Aug 24	17:30	Tunisia	0–3	Poland	20–25	21–25	17–25		58–75	116–150	P2
Aug 25	10:00	Brazil	3–0	Tunisia	25–18	25–23	25–15			75–56	P2
Aug 25	15:00	Poland	3–1	Canada	25–18	27–29	25–22	25-15		102–69	P2

=== Pool D ===
Pos	Team	Pld	W	L	Pts	SW	SL	SR	SPW	SPL	SPR	Qualification
1	Serbia and Montenegro	3	3	0	6	9	3	3.000	290	249	1.165	Second round
2	Bulgaria	3	2	1	5	6	3	2.000	213	199	1.070	Second round
3	Slovakia	3	1	2	4	5	6	0.833	233	254	0.917	Second round
4	Italy	3	0	3	3	1	9	0.111	215	249	0.863	

Date	Time		Score		Set 1	Set 2	Set 3	Set 4	Set 5	Total	Report
Aug 23	14:00	Serbia and Montenegro	3–1	Italy	25–20	25–22	22–25	26–24		98–91	P2
Aug 23	18:00	Slovakia	0–3	Bulgaria	23–25	17–25	22–25			62–75	P2
Aug 24	10:00	Italy	0–3	Slovakia	19–25	24–26	23–25			66–76	P2
Aug 24	10:00	Serbia and Montenegro	3–0	Bulgaria	25–17	25–19	29–27			79–63	P2
Aug 25	15:00	Italy	0–3	Bulgaria	21–25	20–25	17–25			58–75	P2
Aug 25	19:00	Serbia and Montenegro	3–2	Slovakia	25–16	23–25	25–17	25-27	15-10	113–58	P2

== Second round ==
=== Play off - elimination group ===
Date	Time		Score		Set 1	Set 2	Set 3	Set 4	Set 5	Total	Report
Aug 27	10:00	Poland	3–1	India	25–22	20–25	25–21	25–18		95–86	P2
Aug 27	17:00	Iran	3–0	Slovakia	25–16	25–22	25–23			75–61	P2
Aug 27	19:00	Germany	3–1	Canada	23–25	25–21	25–21	25–22		98–89	P2
Aug 27	19:15	Bulgaria	3–0	Egypt	25–18	25–22	25–18			75–58	P2

=== Play off - seeding group ===
Date	Time		Score		Set 1	Set 2	Set 3	Set 4	Set 5	Total	Report
Aug 27	10:00	Serbia and Montenegro	3–0	South Korea	25–19	26–24	25–19			76–62	P2
Aug 27	17:00	Brazil	3–1	Russia	25–22	21–25	25–16	25-21		96–63	P2

== Final round ==
- All times are Iran Daylight Time (UTC+04:30)

5th–8th places
August 30 – Tehran
Germany	2
Iran	3
August 39 – Tehran
Serbia and Montenegro	2
Russia	3

5th place
August 31 – Tehran
Iran	0
Russia	3
7th place
August 31 – Tehran
Germany	0
Serbia and Montenegro	3

=== 5th–8th semifinals ===
Date	Time		Score		Set 1	Set 2	Set 3	Set 4	Set 5	Total	Report
Aug 30	10:00	Serbia and Montenegro	2–3	Russia	17–25	26–24	30–28	23–25	7-15	103–102	P2
Aug 30	17:00	Germany	2–3	Iran	22–25	25–23	21–25	25-20	12-15	105–73	P2

==== 7th place ====
Date	Time		Score		Set 1	Set 2	Set 3	Set 4	Set 5	Total	Report
Aug 31	9:00	Serbia and Montenegro	3–0	Germany	25–16	25–22	25–22			75–60	P2

==== 5th place ====
Date	Time		Score		Set 1	Set 2	Set 3	Set 4	Set 5	Total	Report
Aug 31	11:00	Russia	3–0	Iran	25–20	25–19	25–19			75–58	P2

Quarterfinals
August 29 – Tehran
Poland	3
Serbia and Montenegro	1
August 29 – Tehran
Bulgaria	3
Russia	1
August 29 – Tehran
South Korea	3
Germany	2
August 29 – Tehran
Brazil	3
Iran	0

Semifinals
August 30 – Tehran
Poland	3
Bulgaria	1
August 30 – Tehran
South Korea	0
Brazil	3

Final
August 31 – Tehran
Poland	3
Brazil	2
3rd place
August 31 – Tehran
Bulgaria	3
South Korea	0

=== Quarterfinals ===
Date	Time		Score		Set 1	Set 2	Set 3	Set 4	Set 5	Total	Report
Aug 29	10:00	Poland	3–1	Serbia and Montenegro	26–24	25–23	22–25	–		73–72	P2
Aug 29	15:00	Bulgaria	3–1	Russia	25–21	16–25	25–23	25-19		91–69	P2
Aug 30	17:15	South Korea	3–2	Germany	24–26	25–21	25–19	23–25	15–11	112–102	P2
Aug 30	19:45	Brazil	3–0	Iran	25–21	25–20	25–20			75–61	P2

=== Semifinals ===
Date	Time		Score		Set 1	Set 2	Set 3	Set 4	Set 5	Total	Report
Aug 23	15:00	Poland	3–1	Bulgaria	21–25	27–25	25–20	25–21		98–91	P2
Aug 23	19:45	South Korea	0–3	Brazil	18-25	20–25	19–25			57–50	P2

==== 3rd place ====
Date	Time		Score		Set 1	Set 2	Set 3	Set 4	Set 5	Total	Report
Aug 31	15:00	Bulgaria	3–0	South Korea	25–19	25–16	25–21			75–56	P2

==== Final ====
Date	Time		Score		Set 1	Set 2	Set 3	Set 4	Set 5	Total	Report
Aug 31	19:00	Poland	3–2	Brazil	25–23	20–25	25–23	22–25	15–11	107–107	P2

== Final standing ==
Rank	Team
1st place, gold medalist(s)	Poland
2nd place, silver medalist(s)	Brazil
3rd place, bronze medalist(s)	Bulgaria
4	South Korea
5	Russia
6	Iran
7	Serbia and Montenegro
8	Germany
9	Canada
9	Egypt
9	India
9	Slovakia
13	Tunisia
13	China
13	Italy
13	Venezuela

2003 Men's U21 World champions

Poland
2nd title

12–man Roster
Artur Augustyn, Marcel Gromadowski, Michał Kaczmarek, Marcin Kryś, Marcin Możdżonek, Bartłomiej Neroj, Arkadiusz Olejniczak, Michał Ruciak, Dariusz Szulik, Michał Winiarski (C), Mariusz Wlazły, Paweł Woicki
Head coach
Grzegorz Ryś
