= 2007 FIVB Volleyball Men's U21 World Championship =

2007 International Volleyball Championship

2007 Men's Junior World Championship
Tournament details
- Host country: Morocco
- Dates: 7–15 July
- Teams: 12
- Venues: 2 (in 2 host cities)

Final positions
- Champions: Brazil (3rd title)

Tournament awards
- MVP: (Brazil) Deivid Costa

The 2007 FIVB Volleyball Men's Junior World Championship was held from 7 to 15 July 2007 in Rabat and Casablanca, Morocco. It was the last tournament to feature 12 teams.

== Competing nations ==
Drawing of lots to determine Pools composition was held on 7 June 2007.

Group A in Casablanca	Group B in Rabat
Morocco; Iran; Cuba; Italy; Japan; Bulgaria	Brazil; Russia; Argentina; Egypt; United States; Slovenia

== First round ==
- All times are Morocco's Standard Time WET (UTC+00:00).

=== Pool A ===
Pos	Team	Pld	W	L	Pts	SW	SL	SR	SPW	SPL	SPR	Qualification
1	Iran	5	4	1	9	14	6	2.333	463	408	1.135	Championship round
2	Italy	5	3	2	8	13	7	1.857	461	407	1.133	Championship round
3	Cuba	5	3	2	8	11	10	1.100	452	446	1.013	5th-8th place round
4	Bulgaria	5	3	2	8	11	10	1.100	438	441	0.993	5th-8th place round
5	Japan	5	2	3	7	10	12	0.833	479	487	0.984	
6	Morocco	5	0	5	5	1	15	0.067	293	397	0.738	

Date	Time		Score		Set 1	Set 2	Set 3	Set 4	Set 5	Total	Report
7 July	10:00	Bulgaria	0–3	Iran	19–25	17–25	12–25			48–75	P2 P3
7 July	15:00	Italy	3–0	Cuba	27–25	25–16	25–17			77–58	P2 P3
7 July	18:30	Morocco	1–3	Japan	23–25	16–25	25–22	17–25		81–97	P2 P3
8 July	10:00	Japan	3–2	Cuba	25–20	21–25	17–25	25–15	15–12	103–97	P2 P3
8 July	16:00	Iran	3–2	Italy	20–25	17–25	25–22	25–21	21–19	108–112	P2 P3
8 July	18:30	Morocco	0–3	Bulgaria	20–25	19–25	16–25			55–75	P2 P3
9 July	10:00	Bulgaria	3–2	Japan	24–26	25–19	25–16	21–25	15–12	110–98	P2 P3
9 July	16:00	Cuba	3–2	Iran	23–25	25–17	21–25	25–23	15–13	109–103	P2 P3
9 July	18:30	Italy	3–0	Morocco	25–22	25–16	25–13			75–51	P2 P3
10 July	10:00	Japan	1–3	Iran	22–25	25–21	18–25	29–31		94–102	P2 P3
10 July	16:00	Bulgaria	3–2	Italy	20–25	25–20	25–12	18–25	15–9	103–91	P2 P3
10 July	18:30	Morocco	0–3	Cuba	19–25	22–25	20–25			61–75	P2 P3
11 July	10:00	Cuba	3–2	Bulgaria	17–25	25–14	27–29	25–17	19–17	113–102	P2 P3
11 July	16:00	Italy	3–1	Japan	20–25	25–19	25–18	27–25		97–87	P2 P3
11 July	18:30	Iran	3–0	Morocco	25–15	25–16	25–14			75–45	P2 P3

=== Pool B ===
Pos	Team	Pld	W	L	Pts	SW	SL	SR	SPW	SPL	SPR	Qualification
1	Brazil	5	4	1	9	13	5	2.600	435	354	1.229	Championship round
2	Russia	5	4	1	9	12	4	3.000	399	345	1.157	Championship round
3	United States	5	3	2	8	10	10	1.000	445	451	0.987	5th-8th place round
4	Argentina	5	2	3	7	7	10	0.700	367	403	0.911	5th-8th place round
5	Slovenia	5	1	4	6	7	12	0.583	406	424	0.958	
6	Egypt	5	1	4	6	5	13	0.385	349	424	0.823	

Date	Time		Score		Set 1	Set 2	Set 3	Set 4	Set 5	Total	Report
7 July	10:00	Slovenia	1–3	Argentina	25–16	23–25	23–25	23–25		94–91	P2 P3
7 July	16:00	Russia	3–1	Brazil	28–26	19–25	27–25	25–13		99–89	P2 P3
7 July	18:30	United States	3–2	Egypt	17–25	26–28	25–16	25–22	18–16	111–107	P2 P3
8 July	10:00	Egypt	0–3	Slovenia	18–25	18–25	13–25			49–75	P2 P3
8 July	16:00	Russia	0–3	United States	26–28	22–25	27–29			75–82	P2 P3
8 July	18:30	Brazil	3–0	Argentina	25–10	25–18	25–22			75–50	P2 P3
9 July	10:00	Argentina	1–3	Egypt	16–25	25–23	24–26	23–25		88–99	P2 P3
9 July	16:00	United States	1–3	Brazil	22–25	25–20	18–25	19–25		84–95	P2 P3
9 July	18:30	Slovenia	0–3	Russia	19–25	20–25	22–25			61–75	P2 P3
10 July	10:00	Brazil	3–0	Egypt	25–17	25–14	25–13			75–44	P2 P3
10 July	16:00	Russia	3–0	Argentina	25–23	25–18	25–22			75–63	P2 P3
10 July	18:30	United States	3–2	Slovenia	23–25	25–17	25–23	20–25	15–9	108–99	P2 P3
11 July	10:00	Argentina	3–0	United States	25–20	25–20	25–20			75–60	P2 P3
11 July	16:00	Slovenia	1–3	Brazil	12–25	28–26	20–25	17–25		77–101	P2 P3
11 July	18:30	Egypt	0–3	Russia	12–25	17–25	21–25			50–75	P2 P3

== Final round ==
=== 9th–12th places bracket ===
9th–12th places
14 July – Casablanca
Japan	1
Egypt	3
14 July – Casablanca
Morocco	0
Slovenia	3

9th place
15 July – Casablanca
Egypt	1
Slovenia	3
11th place
15 July – Casablanca
Japan	3
Morocco	1

==== Classification 9th-12th ====
Date	Time		Score		Set 1	Set 2	Set 3	Set 4	Set 5	Total	Report
14 July	9:00	Japan	1–3	Egypt	26–24	24–26	20–25	19–25		89–100	P2 P3
14 July	11:30	Morocco	0–3	Slovenia	17–25	18–25	23–25			58–75	P2 P3

==== 12th-place match ====
Date	Time		Score		Set 1	Set 2	Set 3	Set 4	Set 5	Total	Report
15 July	9:00	Japan	3–1	Morocco	25–23	25–23	20–25	25–21		95–92	P2 P3

==== 9th-place match ====
Date	Time		Score		Set 1	Set 2	Set 3	Set 4	Set 5	Total	Report
15 July	11:30	Egypt	1–3	Slovenia	23–25	25–22	19–25	16–25		83–97	P2 P3

=== 5th-8th places bracket ===
5th-8th places
14 July – Rabat
Bulgaria	3
United States	0
14 July – Rabat
Cuba	0
Argentina	3

5th place
15 July – Rabat
Bulgaria	0
Argentina	3
7th place
15 July – Rabat
United States	3
Cuba	1

==== Classification 5th-8th ====
Date	Time		Score		Set 1	Set 2	Set 3	Set 4	Set 5	Total	Report
14 July	16:00	Bulgaria	3–0	United States	26–24	25–22	25–22			76–68	P2 P3
14 July	18:30	Cuba	0–3	Argentina	20–25	19–25	23–25			62–75	P2 P3

==== 7th-place match ====
Date	Time		Score		Set 1	Set 2	Set 3	Set 4	Set 5	Total	Report
15 July	9:00	United States	3–1	Cuba	30–28	20–25	25–23	25–20		100–96	P2 P3

==== 5th-place match ====
Date	Time		Score		Set 1	Set 2	Set 3	Set 4	Set 5	Total	Report
15 July	11:30	Bulgaria	0–3	Argentina	24–26	15–25	20–25			59–76	P2 P3

=== 1st-4th places bracket ===
Semifinals
14 July – Casablanca
Italy	2
Brazil	3
14 July – Casablanca
Iran	1
Russia	3

Final
15 July – Casablanca
Brazil	3
Russia	0
3rd place
15 July – Casablanca
Italy	1
Iran	3

==== Semifinals ====
Date	Time		Score		Set 1	Set 2	Set 3	Set 4	Set 5	Total	Report
14 July	16:00	Italy	2–3	Brazil	18–25	25–15	27–25	20–25	8–15	98–105	P2 P3
14 July	18:30	Iran	1–3	Russia	25–21	22–25	23–25	21–25		91–96	P2 P3

==== Bronze-medal match ====
Date	Time		Score		Set 1	Set 2	Set 3	Set 4	Set 5	Total	Report
15 July	16:00	Italy	1–3	Iran	25–27	25–19	20–25	17–25		87–96	P2 P3

==== Final ====
Date	Time		Score		Set 1	Set 2	Set 3	Set 4	Set 5	Total	Report
15 July	18:30	Brazil	3–0	Russia	25–18	25–18	25–19			75–55	P2 P3

== Final standing ==
Rank	Team
1st place, gold medalist(s)	Brazil
2nd place, silver medalist(s)	Russia
3rd place, bronze medalist(s)	Iran
4	Italy
5	Argentina
6	Bulgaria
7	United States
8	Cuba
9	Slovenia
10	Egypt
11	Japan
12	Morocco

2007 Men's U21 World champions

Brazil
3rd title

12–man Roster
Wanderson Campos, Guilherme Hage, Lucas de Deus, Felipe Bandero, Tiago Barth, Tiago Gelinski, Wallace de Souza, William Da Costa (C), Carlos Faccin, Deivid Costa, Bernardo Assis, José Santos Júnior
Head coach
Percy Oncken

== Individual awards ==
- MVP: (Brazil) Deivid Costa
- Best scorer: (Italy) Matteo Martino
- Best spiker: (Italy) Matteo Martino
- Best blocker: (Brazil) Deivid Costa
- Best server: (Russia) Maxim Mikhaylov
- Best digger: (Russia) Roman Martynyuk
- Best setter: (Italy) Davide Saitta
- Best receiver: (Italy) Matteo Martino
