= Brazil men's national under-21 volleyball team =

Men's national volleyball team representing Brazil

Brazil
- Association: CBV
- Confederation: CSV
- Head coach: Anderson Rodrigues

Uniforms
Home	Away	Third

FIVB U21 World Championship
- Appearances: 23 (First in 1977)
- Best result: (gold) (1993, 2001, 2007, 2009)

South American U21 Championship
- Appearances: 26 (First in 1972)
- Best result: (gold) (1972, 1974, 1976, 1978, 1984, 1986, 1988, 1990, 1992, 1994, 1996, 1998, 2002, 2004, 2006, 2010, 2012, 2014, 2018, 2022, 2024)
- www.cbv.com.br (in Portuguese)

The Brazil men's national under-21 volleyball team represents Brazil in international men's volleyball competitions and friendly matches under the age 21 and it is ruled by the Brazilian Volleyball Federation that is a member of South American volleyball body Confederación Sudamericana de Voleibol (CSV) and the international volleyball body government the Fédération Internationale de Volleyball (FIVB).

== Results ==
=== U21 World Championship ===
Champions Runners up Third place Fourth place

World Championship
Year	Round	Position	GP	MW	ML	SW	SL	Squad
(Brazil) 1977	Final Round	3rd place						Squad
(United States) 1981	Final	Runners up						Squad
(Italy) 1985	5th–8th semifinals	6th place						Squad
(Bahrain) 1987	5th–8th semifinals	6th place						Squad
(Greece) 1989	Semifinals	3rd place						Squad
(Egypt) 1991	Semifinals	4th place						Squad
(Argentina) 1993	Final	Champions						Squad
(Malaysia) 1995	Final	Runners up						Squad
(Bahrain) 1997	Final	Runners up						Squad
(Thailand) 1999	Semifinals	3rd place						Squad
(Poland) 2001	Final	Champions	7	6	1	20	6	Squad
(Iran) 2003	Final	Runners up	7	6	1	20	5	Squad
(India) 2005	Final	Runners up	7	6	1	18	7	Squad
(Morocco) 2007	Final	Champions	7	6	1	19	7	Squad
(India) 2009	Final	Champions	8	8	0	24	6	Squad
(Brazil) 2011	5th–8th semifinals	5th place	8	5	3	20	15	Squad
(Turkey) 2013	Final	Runners up	8	5	3	19	11	Squad
(Mexico) 2015	Semifinals	4th place	8	5	3	17	13	Squad
(Czech Republic) 2017	Semifinals	4th place	8	5	3	19	10	Squad
(Bahrain) 2019	Semifinals	3rd place	8	6	2	18	8	Squad
(Italy) (Bulgaria) 2021	5th–8th semifinals	7th place	7	3	4	13	12	Squad
(Bahrain) 2023	5th–8th semifinals	6th place	8	5	3	17	11	Squad
(China) 2025	17th–24th semifinals	18th place	8	3	5	13	16	Squad
Total	4 Titles	23/23	—	—	—	—	—	—

=== South American U21 Championship ===
Champions Runners up Third place Fourth place

South American Championship
Year	Round	Position	GP	MW	ML	SW	SL	Squad
(Brazil) 1972	Round robin	Champions						Squad
(Argentina) 1974	Round robin	Champions						Squad
(Bolivia) 1976	Round robin	Champions						Squad
(Brazil) 1978	Round robin	Champions						Squad
(Chile) 1980	Round robin	Runners up						Squad
(Argentina) 1982	Round robin	Runners up						Squad
(Colombia) 1984	Round robin	Champions						Squad
(Brazil) 1986	Round robin	Champions						Squad
(Venezuela) 1988	Round robin	Champions						Squad
(Argentina) 1990	Round robin	Champions						Squad
(Ecuador) 1992	Round robin	Champions						Squad
(Peru) 1994	Round robin	Champions						Squad
(Colombia) 1996	Final	Champions						Squad
(Chile) 1998	Round robin	Champions						Squad
(Venezuela) 2000	Final	Runners up						Squad
(Brazil) 2002	Round robin	Champions	5	5	0	15	0	Squad
(Chile) 2004	Final	Champions	6	6	0	18	1	Squad
(Brazil) 2006	Final	Champions	5	5	0	15	2	Squad
(Brazil) 2008	Final	Runners up	5	4	1	13	5	Squad
(Chile) 2010	Final	Champions	5	5	0	15	2	Squad
(Brazil) 2012	Final	Champions	4	4	0	12	0	Squad
(Brazil) 2014	Final	Champions	5	5	0	15	0	Squad
(Argentina) 2016	Round robin	Runners up	5	4	1	13	3	Squad
(Argentina) 2018	Final	Champions	4	4	0	12	2	Squad
(Peru) 2022	Final	Champions	4	4	0	12	0	Squad
(Peru) 2024	Final	Champions	4	3	1	9	5	Squad
Total	21 titles	26/26	—	—	—	—	—	—

=== U21 Pan-American Cup ===
Champions Runners up Third place Fourth place

Pan-American Cup
Year	Round	Position	GP	MW	ML	SW	SL	Squad
(Panama) 2011	Did not enter							
(Canada) 2015	Final	Champions	5	5	0	15	2	Squad
(Canada) 2017	Final	Champions	5	5	0	15	2	Squad
(Peru) 2019	Did not enter							
Total	2 titles	2/4	—	—	—	—	—	—

== Team ==
=== Current squad ===
The following is the Brazilian roster in the 2017 FIVB Volleyball Men's U21 World Championship.

Head coach: Tambeiro Nery Pereira Jr.

No.	Name	Date of birth	Height	Weight	Spike	Block	2017 club
3	Davy Moraes	4 April 1997	1.99 m (6 ft 6 in)	93 kg (205 lb)	.353 cm (139 in)	330 cm (130 in)	(Brazil) Minas Tênis Clube
4	Felipe Roque	19 May 1997	2.05 m (6 ft 9 in)	94 kg (207 lb)	355 cm (140 in)	335 cm (132 in)	(Brazil) Minas Tênis Clube
5	Matheus Silva (C)	1 April 1997	1.78 m (5 ft 10 in)	86 kg (190 lb)	312 cm (123 in)	290 cm (110 in)	(Brazil) São Bernardo Vôlei
8	Henrique Honorato	18 March 1997	1.90 m (6 ft 3 in)	85 kg (187 lb)	335 cm (132 in)	310 cm (120 in)	(Brazil) Minas Tênis Clube
9	Victor Cardoso	22 March 1999	1.99 m (6 ft 6 in)	86 kg (190 lb)	334 cm (131 in)	325 cm (128 in)	(Brazil) SESI São Paulo
11	Daniel Mascarenhas	13 April 1997	2.02 m (6 ft 8 in)	91 kg (201 lb)	342 cm (135 in)	317 cm (125 in)	
12	Gabriel Bertolini	20 August 1997	1.99 m (6 ft 6 in)	93 kg (205 lb)	338 cm (133 in)	315 cm (124 in)	(Brazil) SESI São Paulo
13	Maique Nascimento	16 July 1997	1.87 m (6 ft 2 in)	78 kg (172 lb)	0 cm (0 in)	0 cm (0 in)	
15	Luis Rodrigues	3 August 1998	1.88 m (6 ft 2 in)	69 kg (152 lb)	318 cm (125 in)	285 cm (112 in)	(Brazil) Santo André Vôlei
17	Alexandre Elias	30 September 1997	1.90 m (6 ft 3 in)	85 kg (187 lb)	358 cm (141 in)	335 cm (132 in)	
18	Lucas Adriano Barreto	24 June 1997	2.07 m (6 ft 9 in)	88 kg (194 lb)	349 cm (137 in)	322 cm (127 in)	(Brazil) SESI São Paulo
19	Pablo Natan Ventura	29 April 1998	1.94 m (6 ft 4 in)	92 kg (203 lb)	336 cm (132 in)	315 cm (124 in)	(Brazil) Sada Cruzeiro

== Former squads ==
=== U21 World Championship ===
- 2001 – Gold medal
  Diogenes Zagonel, Murilo Endres, Rodrigo Santos, Riad Ribeiro, Bruna Silva, Evandro Guerra, Leandro Vissotto, Dante Trevisan, Roberto Minuzzi, André Luiz Eloi, Joao Grangeiro and Alberto Mendes
- 2003 – Silver medal
  Eder Carbonera, Raphael Margarido (c), Leandro da Silva, Michael dos Santos, Wallace Martins, Ricardo Aviz, Bruno Zanuto, Luiz Felipe Fonteles, Samuel Fuchs, Raphael de Oliveira, Leandro Greca and Joao Paulo Tavares
- 2005 – Silver medal
  Douglas Barbosa, Rodolpho Granato, Luiz Coelho, Thiago Machado, Tiago Brendle, Thiago Alves (c), Lucas Saatkamp, Marcus Jubé, Bruno Rezende, Igor Pinto, Thiago Sens and Silmar Almeida
- 2007 – Gold medal
  Wanderson Campos, Guilherme Hage, Lucas de Deus, Felipe Bandero, Tiago Barth, Tiago Gelinski, Wallace de Souza, William da Costa (c), Carlos Faccin, Deivid Costa, Bernardo Assis and José Santos Júnior
- 2009 – Gold medal
  Aurélio Figueiredo, Tiago Wesz, Maurício Borges Silva, Murilo Radke (c), Guilherme Koepp, Najari Carvalho, Isac Santos, Ygor Duarte, Renan Buiatti, Jairo Medeiros, Thales Hoss and Franco Paese
- 2011 – 5th place
  Bernardo Reitz, Matheus Cunda, Otávio Pinto (c), Ricardo Lucarelli Souza, Felipe Rosa, Guilherme Kachel, Vitor Dias, Renan Purificacao, Rafael Martins, Hugo Silva, Luan Weber and Lucas Loh
- 2013 – Silver medal
  Alan Souza, Eder Kock, Rogério Filho, Felipe Hernandez, Leandro Santos, Douglas Souza, Flávio Gualberto, Thiago Veloso (c), Lucas Madaloz, Leonardo Nascimento, Henrique Batagim and Carlos Silva
- 2015 – 4th place
  Leonardo Nascimento, Rogério Filho, Robert Araujo, Pedro Silva, Rodrigo Leão, Douglas Souza, Johan Marengoni, Fernando Kreling (c), Caio Oliveira, Gabriel Kavalkievicz, Lucas Madaloz and Romulo Silva
- 2017 – 4th place
  Davy Moraes, Felipe Roque, Matheus Silva (c), Henrique Honorato, Victor Cardoso, Daniel Mascarenhas, Gabriel Bertolini, Maique Nascimento, Luis Rodrigues, Alexandre Elias, Lucas Barreto and Pablo Ventura
- 2019 – Bronze medal
  Nathan Krupp, Bruno Ruivo, Gustavo Orlando, Rhendrick Rosa (c), Gabriel Cotrim, Marcus Coelho, Victor Cardoso, Lucas Figueiredo, Angellus Silva, Guilherme Voss Santos, Edson Paixão and Welinton Oppenkoski

== See also ==
- Brazil women's national under-20 volleyball team
- Brazil men's national volleyball team
- Brazil men's national under-23 volleyball team
- Brazil men's national under-19 volleyball team
