= Argentina men's national under-21 volleyball team =

Youth volleyball team representing Argentina

Argentina
- Association: FeVA
- Confederation: CSV
- Head coach: Sebastian Fernandez

Uniforms
Home	Away

FIVB U21 World Championship
- Appearances: 18 (First in 1977)
- Best result: (silver) (2011, 2015)

South America U21 Championship
- Appearances: 26 (First in 1972)
- Best result: (gold) (1980, 1982, 2008, 2016)
- feva.org.ar/masculina

The Argentina men's national under-21 volleyball team represents Argentina in men's under-21 volleyball events, it is controlled and managed by the Argentine Volleyball Federation that is a member of South American volleyball body Confederación Sudamericana de Voleibol (CSV) and the international volleyball body government the Fédération Internationale de Volleyball (FIVB).

== Results ==
=== FIVB U21 World Championship ===
Champions Runners up Third place Fourth place

FIVB U21 World Championship
Year	Round	Position	Pld	W	L	SW	SL	Squad
(Brazil) 1977		9th place						Squad
(United States) 1981		5th place						Squad
(Italy) 1985		11th place						Squad
(Bahrain) 1987		7th place						Squad
(Greece) 1989		10th place						Squad
(Egypt) 1991		11th place						Squad
(Argentina) 1993		4th place						Squad
(Malaysia) 1995	Did not qualify							
(Bahrain) 1997	Did not qualify							
(Thailand) 1999		8th place						Squad
(Poland) 2001	Did not qualify							
(Iran) 2003	Did not qualify							
(India) 2005	Did not qualify							
(Morocco) 2007		5th place						Squad
(India) 2009		Third place						Squad
(Brazil) 2011	Final	Runners-up						Squad
(Turkey) 2013		7th place						Squad
(Mexico) 2015	Final	Runners-up						Squad
(Czech Republic) 2017		7th place						Squad
(Bahrain) 2019	5th place match	5th place						Squad
(Italy) (Bulgaria) 2021	Semifinals	4th place						Squad
(Bahrain) 2023	Semifinals	4th place						Squad
(China) 2025	15th place match	15th place						Squad
Total	0 Titles	18/23						

=== South America U21 Championship ===
Champions Runners up Third place Fourth place

South America U21 Championship
Year	Round	Position	GP	MW	ML	SW	SL	Squad
(Brazil) 1972		Runners-Up						Squad
(Argentina) 1974		Runners-Up						Squad
(Bolivia) 1976		Runners-Up						Squad
(Brazil) 1978		Runners-Up						Squad
(Chile) 1980		Champions						Squad
(Argentina) 1982		Champions						Squad
(Colombia) 1984		Runners-Up						Squad
(Brazil) 1986		Runners-Up						Squad
(Venezuela) 1988		Runners-Up						Squad
(Argentina) 1990		Runners-Up						Squad
(Ecuador) 1992		Runners-Up						Squad
(Peru) 1994		3rd place						Squad
(Colombia) 1996		3rd place						Squad
(Chile) 1998		4th place						Squad
(Venezuela) 2000		3rd place						Squad
(Brazil) 2002	Round robin	3rd place						Squad
(Chile) 2004	Final	Runners-up						Squad
(Brazil) 2006	Final	Runners-up						Squad
(Brazil) 2008	Final	Champions						Squad
(Chile) 2010	Final	Runners-up						Squad
(Brazil) 2012	Final	Runners-up						Squad
(Brazil) 2014	Final	Runners-up						Squad
(Argentina) 2016	Final	Champions						Squad
(Argentina) 2018	Final	Runners-up						Squad
(Peru) 2022	Round robin	Runners-up						Squad
(Peru) 2024	Semifinals	3rd place	5	4	1	13	6	Squad
Total	4 Titles	26/26	—	—	—	—	—	—

=== Pan-American U21 Cup ===
Champions Runners up Third place Fourth place

Pan-American U21 Cup
Year	Round	Position	Pld	W	L	SW	SL	Squad
(Panama) 2011	Didn't enter							
(Canada) 2015	Didn't enter							
(Canada) 2017	Didn't enter							
Total	0 Titles	0/3						

== Team ==
=== Current squad ===
The following is the Argentine roster in the 2017 FIVB Volleyball Men's U21 World Championship.

Head coach: Alejandro Grossi

No.	Name	Date of birth	Height	Weight	Spike	Block	2017 club
1	Santiago Arroyo	10 August 1999	1.73 m (5 ft 8 in)	75 kg (165 lb)	305 cm (120 in)	290 cm (110 in)	(Argentina) Club de Amigos
2	Gerónimo Elgueta	19 July 1997	1.83 m (6 ft 0 in)	79 kg (174 lb)	328 cm (129 in)	315 cm (124 in)	(Argentina) Obras Pocito
3	Jan Martinez Franchi	28 January 1998	1.90 m (6 ft 3 in)	85 kg (187 lb)	333 cm (131 in)	316 cm (124 in)	(Argentina) Club Ciudad de Buenos Aires
4	Sergio Soria	20 April 1997	1.96 m (6 ft 5 in)	90 kg (200 lb)	335 cm (132 in)	315 cm (124 in)	(Argentina) Club Ciudad de Buenos Aires
7	Matias Giraudo	13 March 1998	1.96 m (6 ft 5 in)	85 kg (187 lb)	330 cm (130 in)	315 cm (124 in)	(Argentina) Club Atlético River Plate
9	Felipe Benavidez	31 January 1997	1.92 m (6 ft 4 in)	83 kg (183 lb)	330 cm (130 in)	315 cm (124 in)	(Argentina) Club Ciudad de Buenos Aires
10	Liam Ernesto Arreche	30 December 1997	1.94 m (6 ft 4 in)	92 kg (203 lb)	339 cm (133 in)	320 cm (130 in)	(Argentina) Club de Amigos
11	Juan Horacio Bucciarelli	26 November 1997	1.93 m (6 ft 4 in)	86 kg (190 lb)	336 cm (132 in)	315 cm (124 in)	(Argentina) CoDeBa de San Juan
12	Manuel Balague	12 August 1998	1.90 m (6 ft 3 in)	85 kg (187 lb)	332 cm (131 in)	317 cm (125 in)	(Argentina) Club Atlético River Plate
13	Agustín Loser	12 October 1997	1.93 m (6 ft 4 in)	77 kg (170 lb)	335 cm (132 in)	310 cm (120 in)	(Argentina) Club Ciudad de Buenos Aires
15	Ignacio Roberts (C)	28 July 1997	1.82 m (6 ft 0 in)	78 kg (172 lb)	315 cm (124 in)	295 cm (116 in)	(Argentina) Club Ciudad de Buenos Aires
19	Luciano Palonsky	8 July 1999	1.98 m (6 ft 6 in)	72 kg (159 lb)	330 cm (130 in)	310 cm (120 in)	(Argentina) Club Ciudad de Buenos Aires
