= Croatia men's national under-21 volleyball team =

Volleyball team

Croatia U21
- Association: Croatian Volleyball Federation
- Confederation: CEV

Uniforms
Home	Away	Third

FIVB U21 World Championship
- Appearances: No Appearances

Europe U21 / U20 Championship
- Appearances: Data uncompleted
- Official website

The Croatia men's national under-21 volleyball team represents Croatia in international men's volleyball competitions and friendly matches under the age 21 and it is ruled by the Croatian Volleyball Federation body that is an affiliate of the Federation of International Volleyball FIVB and also part of the European Volleyball Confederation CEV.

== Results ==
=== FIVB U21 World Championship ===
Champions Runners up Third place Fourth place

FIVB U21 World Championship
Year	Round	Position	Pld	W	L	SW	SL	Squad
(Brazil) 1977	Didn't qualify							
(United States) 1981	Didn't qualify							
(Italy) 1985	Didn't qualify							
(Bahrain) 1987	Didn't qualify							
(Greece) 1989	Didn't qualify							
(Egypt) 1991	Didn't qualify							
(Argentina) 1993	Didn't qualify							
(Malaysia) 1995	Didn't qualify							
(Bahrain) 1997	Didn't qualify							
(Thailand) 1999	Didn't qualify							
(Poland) 2001	Didn't qualify							
(Iran) 2003	Didn't qualify							
(India) 2005	Didn't qualify							
(Morocco) 2007	Didn't qualify							
(India) 2009	Didn't qualify							
(Brazil) 2011	Didn't qualify							
(Turkey) 2013	Didn't qualify							
(Mexico) 2015	Didn't qualify							
(Czech Republic) 2017	Didn't qualify							
(Bahrain) 2019	Didn't qualify							
(Italy) (Bulgaria) 2021	Didn't qualify							
(Bahrain) 2023	Didn't qualify							
(China) 2025	Didn't qualify							
Total	0 Titles	0/23						

== Team ==
=== Current squad ===
The following players are the Croatian players that have competed in the 2018 Men's U20 Volleyball European Championship

#	name	position	height	weight	birthday	spike	block
	Šapina Igor	outside-spiker	189	70	2000	328	315
	Šetic Toni	outside-spiker	180	68	2000	290	280
	Anic Patrik	libero	180	64	2000	300	280
	Babic Lovre	outside-spiker	189	85	1999	328	315
	Brandic Mateo	middle-blocker	190	65	1999	315	300
	Cikojevic Ivan	opposite	197	75	1999	320	305
	Cilaš Marin	outside-spiker	187	75	2000	289	298
	Delic Dominik	setter	182	70	2000	267	262
	Fatoric Andrea	middle-blocker	200	67	2000	340	320
	Hanžic Tino	outside-spiker	195	80	2000	330	310
	Ivancic Gabrijel	setter	186	69	1999	328	315
	Jelic-Periša Patrick	middle-blocker	192	85	1999	327	305
	Jurić Petar	opposite	200	86	2000	342	320
	Kadic Dino	libero	172	67	1999	295	275
	Marinic Filip	outside-spiker	187	85	2000	328	315
	Matoševic Domagoj	middle-blocker	199	89	1999	318	315
	Mišlov Tomislav	setter	188	76	1999	325	315
	Mitrašinovic Tomislav	middle-blocker	205	80	2000	340	320
	Pali Bruno	outside-spiker	180	65	2000	305	290
	Peric Luka	middle-blocker	197	78	2001	288	276
	Radoš Marijan	libero	180	67	2000	305	290
