= Sweden men's national under-21 volleyball team =

Youth volleyball team representing Sweden

Sweden U21
- Association: Swedish Volleyball Federation
- Confederation: CEV

Uniforms
Home	Away	Third

FIVB U21 World Championship
- Appearances: No Appearances

Europe U21 / U20 Championship
- Appearances: Data uncompleted
- www.volleyboll.se (in Swedish)

The Sweden men's national under-21 volleyball team represents Sweden in international men's volleyball competitions and friendly matches under the age 21 and it is ruled by the Swedish Volleyball Federation body that is an affiliate of the Federation of International Volleyball FIVB and also part of the European Volleyball Confederation CEV.

== Results ==
=== FIVB U21 World Championship ===
Champions Runners up Third place Fourth place

FIVB U21 World Championship
Year	Round	Position	Pld	W	L	SW	SL	Squad
(Brazil) 1977	Didn't qualify							
(United States) 1981	Didn't qualify							
(Italy) 1985	Didn't qualify							
(Bahrain) 1987	Didn't qualify							
(Greece) 1989	Didn't qualify							
(Egypt) 1991	Didn't qualify							
(Argentina) 1993	Didn't qualify							
(Malaysia) 1995	Didn't qualify							
(Bahrain) 1997	Didn't qualify							
(Thailand) 1999	Didn't qualify							
(Poland) 2001	Didn't qualify							
(Iran) 2003	Didn't qualify							
(India) 2005	Didn't qualify							
(Morocco) 2007	Didn't qualify							
(India) 2009	Didn't qualify							
(Brazil) 2011	Didn't qualify							
(Turkey) 2013	Didn't qualify							
(Mexico) 2015	Didn't qualify							
(Czech Republic) 2017	Didn't qualify							
(Bahrain) 2019	Didn't qualify							
(Italy) (Bulgaria) 2021	Didn't qualify							
(Bahrain) 2023	Didn't qualify							
(China) 2025	Didn't qualify							
Total	0 Titles	0/23						

== Team ==
=== Previous squad ===
#	name	position	height	weight	birthday	spike	block
	ÅHMAN David	Outside spiker	190	72	2001	332	315
	ANDERSSON Joel	Libero	185	72	2000	314	300
	BERGSTRÖM Kalle	Middle blocker	190	103	1999	330	315
	BRATIC Filip	Setter	182	68	2001	311	295
	BRINK Alfred	Setter	189	82	2000	329	312
	DANIELSSON Algot	Outside spiker	189	85	2000	331	316
	GRUVAEUS Daniel	Outside spiker	193	78	1999	332	
	GUSTAFSSON Viktor	Middle blocker	190	889	1999	330	316
	GUSTAVSSON Lucas	Middle blocker	195	82	1999	330	315
	HELLVIG Jonatan	Outside spiker	192	79	2001	347	328
	JÄMTSVED MILLBERG Joar	Opposite	197	90	2000	349	330
	MOLIN Gustav	Outside spiker	182	76	2001	320	303
	NILSSON Teodor	Middle blocker	197	98	1999	337	323
	PETERSSON Max	Opposite	192	86	2001	321	308
	RIBOM Anton	Middle blocker	206	92	1999	348	332
	SVÄRD Edvin	Libero	185	85	1999	320	307
	THOR Gustav	Outside spiker	189	79	2000	326	305
	VON SYDOW Oskar	Setter	189	79	1999	338	320
	WALTHERSSON Alfred	Outside spiker	177	67	1999	321	305
