= 2024 Men's U21 South American Volleyball Championship =

Tournament details
- Host country: Peru
- City: Callao
- Dates: 30 October – 3 November
- Teams: 7
- Venue: 1 (in 1 host city)

Final positions
- Champions: Brazil (21st title)
- Runners-up: Colombia
- Third place: Argentina
- Fourth place: Peru

Tournament awards
- MVP: (Brazil) Martos Soares
- Best Setter: (Colombia) Juan Restrepo
- Best OH: (Argentina) Mateo Gómez (Colombia) Juan Betancourt
- Best MB: (Brazil) Bernardo Souto (Colombia) Bryan Ramos
- Best OPP: (Brazil) Bryan Silva
- Best Libero: (Brazil) João de Rezende

Tournament statistics
- Matches played: 15

The 2024 Men's U21 South American Volleyball Championship was the 26th edition of the Men's Junior South American Volleyball Championship, the biennial international youth volleyball tournament organised by the Confederación Sudamericana de Voleibol (CSV) for the men's under-21 national teams of South America. It was held in Callao, Peru from 30 October to 3 November 2024.

Same as previous editions, the tournament acted as the CSV qualifiers for the FIVB Volleyball Men's U21 World Championship, but in addition, this edition also acted as the CSV qualifiers for the Junior Pan American Games. The top three teams qualified for both the 2025 FIVB Volleyball Men's U21 World Championship in China and the men's volleyball tournament at the 2025 Junior Pan American Games in Asunción, Paraguay as the CSV representatives (besides Paraguay who automatically qualified as host).

Two-time defending champions Brazil successfully retained their title by winning their twenty-first and third consecutive title with a 3–2 victory over Argentina in the final. Chile completed the podium after defeating Colombia 3–0 in the third-place match.

== Host and venue ==
Location of the venue in the Constitutional Province of Callao.	Callao
Location of the venue in the Constitutional Province of Callao.	Coliseo Miguel Grau
Location of the venue in the Constitutional Province of Callao.	Capacity: 2,400

Peru was confirmed as host country of the tournament during the 76th CSV Annual Congress held on 13 July 2024 in Belo Horizonte, Brazil. It was the third time and second in a row that Peru hosted the tournament after the 1994 and 2022 editions.

On 10 October 2024, Peruvian Volleyball Federation President Gino Vegas confirmed the port city of Callao as the host city, with the Coliseo Miguel Grau, located within the Villa Deportiva del Callao, as venue of the competition.

== Teams ==
Seven of the twelve CSV member associations entered the tournament. Bolivia was initially expected to participate but in the end did not enter the tournament.

Team	App	Previous best performance
Argentina	26th	Champions (1980, 1982, 2008, 2016)
Brazil (holders)	26th	Champions (20 times, most recent 2022)
Chile	24th	Third place (7 times, most recent 2022)
Colombia	21st	Third place (1998, 2016)
Paraguay	16th	Third place (1974)
Peru (hosts)	20th	Third place (1978)
Venezuela	17th	Champions (2000)

=== Squads ===
Each national team had to register a squad of a minimum of 12 and a maximum of 14 players players. Players born on or after 1 January 2005 were eligible to compete in the tournament.

== Competition format ==
The competition format depends on the number of participating teams. With 7 teams two groups were formed, one of three teams and the other of four, which were played on a single round-robin basis in the preliminary round. The group standing procedure was as follows:

1. Number of matches won;
2. Match points;
  - Match won 3–0: 3 match points for the winner, 0 match points for the loser
  - Match won 3–1: 3 match points for the winner, 0 match point for the loser
  - Match won 3–2: 2 match points for the winner, 1 match points for the loser
3. Sets ratio;
4. Points ratio;
5. If the tie continues between two teams: result of the last match between the tied teams;
6. If the tie continues between three or more teams: a new classification would be made taking into consideration only the matches between involved teams.

Once the preliminary round is completed, the top two teams in each group advance to the semi-finals, while the third place teams in each group and the fourth place team in the group of four advance to the playoffs to determine the fifth through seventh-place positions. The winners of the semi-finals advance to the final to define the champions while the losers of the semi-finals decide third and fourth place.

== Preliminary round ==
All match times are local times, PET (UTC-5), as listed by CSV.

=== Group A ===
Pos	Team	Pld	W	L	Pts	SW	SL	SR	SPW	SPL	SPR	Qualification
1	Colombia	2	2	0	6	6	1	6.000	176	148	1.189	Semi-finals
2	Brazil	2	1	1	3	3	3	1.000	143	128	1.117	Semi-finals
3	Chile	2	0	2	0	1	6	0.167	128	171	0.749	5th–7th playoff

Source: FIVB
Rules for classification: Tiebreakers

Date	Time		Score		Set 1	Set 2	Set 3	Set 4	Set 5	Total	Report
30 Oct	15:00	Brazil	0–3	Colombia	28–30	20–25	20–25			68–80	P2 Report
31 Oct	15:00	Colombia	3–1	Chile	21–25	25–23	25–14	25–18		96–80	P2 Report
1 Nov	15:00	Brazil	3–0	Chile	25–12	25–16	25–20			75–48	P2 Report

=== Group B ===
Pos	Team	Pld	W	L	Pts	SW	SL	SR	SPW	SPL	SPR	Qualification
1	Argentina	3	3	0	9	9	2	4.500	274	208	1.317	Semi-finals
2	Peru (H)	3	2	1	5	7	6	1.167	281	288	0.976	Semi-finals
3	Venezuela	3	1	2	3	5	6	0.833	273	273	1.000	5th–7th playoff
4	Paraguay	3	0	3	1	2	9	0.222	203	262	0.775	5th–7th playoff

Source: FIVB
Rules for classification: Tiebreakers
(H) Host

Date	Time		Score		Set 1	Set 2	Set 3	Set 4	Set 5	Total	Report
30 Oct	17:00	Argentina	3–0	Paraguay	25–13	25–17	25–15			75–45	P2 Report
30 Oct	19:00	Peru	3–1	Venezuela	25–23	31–29	19–25	27–25		102–102	P2 Report
31 Oct	17:00	Argentina	3–1	Venezuela	29–27	25–21	27–29	25–18		106–95	P2 Report
31 Oct	19:00	Peru	3–2	Paraguay	18–25	28–30	25–14	25–18	15–6	111–93	P2 Report
1 Nov	17:00	Paraguay	0–3	Venezuela	24–26	18–25	23–25			65–76	[P2] Report
1 Nov	19:00	Peru	1–3	Argentina	8–25	25–18	18–25	17–25		68–93	[P2] Report

== Final round ==
=== 5th–7th playoff ===
In the fifth to seventh place playoff, the third place team from Group A faced the fourth and third place teams from Group B, with the result between the latter two in the preliminary round being carried over to this round to be taken into account in the playoff standings.

Pos	Team	Pld	W	L	Pts	SW	SL	SR	SPW	SPL	SPR
5	Chile	2	2	0	6	6	1	6.000	178	151	1.179
6	Venezuela	2	1	1	3	4	3	1.333	173	167	1.036
7	Paraguay	2	0	2	0	0	6	0.000	119	152	0.783

Source: FIVB
Rules for classification: Tiebreakers

Date	Time		Score		Set 1	Set 2	Set 3	Set 4	Set 5	Total	Report
2 Nov	15:00	Chile	3–0	Paraguay	25–17	25–13	26–24			76–54	[P2] Report
3 Nov	15:00	Chile	3–1	Venezuela	25–22	29–27	23–25	25–23		102–97	[P2] Report

=== Final four ===
Semi-finals
2 November
Brazil	3
Argentina	1
2 November
Peru	1
Colombia	3

Final
3 November
Brazil	3
Colombia	1
Third-place match
3 November
Argentina	3
Peru	1

==== Semi-finals ====
Date	Time		Score		Set 1	Set 2	Set 3	Set 4	Set 5	Total	Report
2 Nov	17:00	Brazil	3–1	Argentina	30–28	23–25	25–20	26–24		104–97	[P2] Report
2 Nov	19:00	Peru	1–3	Colombia	25–22	16–25	20–25	16–25		77–97	[P2] Report

==== 3rd place match ====
Date	Time		Score		Set 1	Set 2	Set 3	Set 4	Set 5	Total	Report
3 Nov	17:00	Argentina	3–1	Peru	25–18	25–11	22–25	25–15		97–69	[P2] Report

==== Final ====
Date	Time		Score		Set 1	Set 2	Set 3	Set 4	Set 5	Total	Report
3 Nov	19:00	Brazil	3–1	Colombia	18–25	25–16	25–17	25–11		93–69	[P2] Report

== Final standing ==
Rank	Team
1st place, gold medalist(s)	Brazil
2nd place, silver medalist(s)	Colombia
3rd place, bronze medalist(s)	Argentina
4	Peru
5	Chile
6	Venezuela
7	Paraguay

Qualified for the 2025 U21 World Championship.

2024 Men's U21 South American Championship champions

Brazil
Twenty-first title

Team Roster:

João de Rezende (L), Joaquim Tavares, Henrique Guedes, Bryan Silva, Vinicius Henrique Souza, José Gabriel Pessoa (L), Felipe Parra, Yan Patrick, Bernardo Otávio Souto, João Victor Scalcon, Thiago Vaccari, Willian Santos, Martos Soares (C), Bruno Figueiredo.

Head coach: (Brazil) Anderson Rodrigues

== Individual awards ==
The following individual awards were presented at the end of the tournament.

- Most valuable player (MVP)

Martos Soares (BRA)

- Best middle blockers

Bernardo Souto (BRA)
Bryan Ramos (COL)

- Best setter

Juan Restrepo (COL)

- Best opposite spiker

Bryan Silva (BRA)

- Best outside spikers

Mateo Gómez (ARG)
Juan Betancourt (COL)

- Best libero

João de Rezende (BRA)

== See also ==
- 2024 Women's U21 South American Volleyball Championship
