= Victor Cardoso =

Brazilian indoor volleyball player (born 1999)

Personal information
- Full name: Victor Alexsander Almeida Cardoso
- Nickname: Victor Birigui
- Born: 22 March 1999 (age 27) Birigui, São Paulo, Brazil
- Height: 1.99 m (6 ft 6 in)
- Weight: 85 kg (187 lb)
- Spike: 350 cm (138 in)
- Block: 325 cm (128 in)

Volleyball information
- Position: Outside Hitter
- Current club: Free agent

Career
- Years: Team
- 2017–2019: Vôlei Itapetininga
- 2019–2020: SESI São Paulo
- 2020–2021: Volley Callipo
- 2021–2023: SESI São Paulo
- 2023–2024: Chaumont Volley-Ball 52
- 2024–2025: Galatasaray

National team
- Years: Team
- 2018–: Brazil
Honours
Men's volleyball
Representing Brazil
South American Championship
Gold medal – first place	2019 Santiago
- Updated on 15 September 2019

Victor Cardoso (born 23 March 1999) is a Brazilian indoor volleyball player. He is a current member of the Brazil men's national volleyball team.

== Club career ==
For the 2024–25 and 2025–26 season, he signed a contract with Galatasaray. On 21 August 2025, Galatasaray announced that it had parted ways with volleyball player Cardoso.

== International career ==
He participated at the 2017 FIVB Volleyball Men's U21 World Championship, 2019 FIVB Volleyball Men's U21 World Championship and 2018 FIVB Volleyball Men's Nations League.

== Sporting achievements ==
=== National team ===
- 2018 Pan-American Cup
- 2019 FIVB U21 World Championship
- 2019 South American Championship

=== Individual ===
- 2016 U19 South American Championship – Best outside spiker
- 2017 U21 Pan-American Cup – Most valuable player
- 2018 U21 South American Championship – Most valuable player
