= Maicon França =

Brazilian volleyball player (born 2004)

Personal information
- Full name: Maicon dos Santos França
- Born: 27 April 2004 (age 22); Rio de Janeiro, Brazil
- Height: 2.18 m (7 ft 2 in)
- Weight: 90 kg (200 lb)
- Spike: 334 cm (131 in)
- Block: 351 cm (138 in)

Volleyball information
- Position: Outside hitter
- Current club: PAOK
- Number: 14 (club and national)

Career
Years	Teams
2019–2020	Fluminense
2020–2025	Sada Cruzeiro
2023–2024	→ EVA Vôlei Araguari (loan)
2024–2025	→ Praia Clube Uberlândia (loan)
2025–2026	Fenerbahçe
2026–	PAOK

National team
2023–present	Brazil
Honours
Men's volleyball
Representing Brazil
Pan American Games
Gold medal – first place	2023 Santiago
Pan American Cup
Silver medal – second place	2023 Guadajalara

Maicon dos Santos França (born 27 April 2004) is a Brazilian international volleyball player who plays as an outside hitter On club level he plays for PAOK He is part of the Brasil men's national volleyball team.

== Personal life ==
On 18 May 2025, he engaged with Brazil international volleyball player Ana Cristina and the couple met under the roof of Fenerbahçe Organization for the 2025-26 season.

== Career and Honors ==
=== Club ===
- (Brazil) Fluminense (2019–2020)
- Sada Cruzeiro (2020–present)
  - FIVB Club World Championship: 2021
  - South American Championship: 2021–22
  - Superliga Brasileira Série A: 2021–22
  - Brazil Cup: 2021 2022
  - Brazil Super Cup: 2022 2021
  - Minas Gerais State Championship: 2020–21, 2021–22
- (Brazil) EVA Vôlei Araguari (2023–2024)
  - Superliga Brasileira Série C: 2023–24
- (Brazil) Praia Clube Uberlândia (2024–25)
  - South American Championship: 2024–25
  - Superliga Brasileira Série A: 2024–25
  - Minas Gerais State Championship: 2024–25

=== Individual ===
- 2022 U21 South American Volleyball Championship - Best middle blocker
- 2025 South American Championship - Best hitter
- 2025 South American Championship - Best scorer
- 2025 South American Championship - Best attacker
