= Nicolás Lazo =

Argentine volleyball player (born 1995)

Personal information
- Nationality: Argentine
- Born: 16 April 1995 (age 31)
- Height: 192 cm (6 ft 4 in)
- Weight: 90 kg (198 lb)
- Spike: 339 cm (133 in)
- Block: 317 cm (125 in)

Volleyball information
- Number: 10

Career
Years	Teams
2013	UPCN Volley Club

National team
Argentina
Honours
Pan American Games
Silver medal – second place	2023 Santiago
Junior South American Championship
Silver medal – second place	2014 Saquarema	Team

Nicolás Lazo (born 16 April 1995) is an Argentine professional male volleyball player. With his club UPCN Volley Club he competed at the 2013 FIVB Volleyball Men's Club World Championship.
