= Mobin Nasri =

Iranian volleyball player (born 2003)

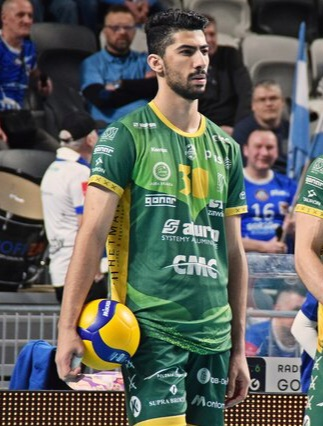
- Mobin Nasri in Zawiercie

Personal information
- Full name: Mobin Nasri Mastanabad
- Nationality: Iranian
- Born: 7 January 2003 (age 23); Urmia, Iran
- Height: 2.02 m (6 ft 8 in)
- Weight: 82 kg (181 lb)
- Spike: 384 cm (151 in)
- Block: 360 cm (142 in)

Volleyball information
- Position: Outside hitter
- Current club: Aluron CMC Warta Zawiercie
- Number: 30

Career
Years	Teams
2018–2022; 2022–2023; 2023–2024; 2024–	(Iran) Shahdab Yazd (Iran) Shahrdari Urmia (Iran) Paykan Tehran (Poland) Aluron CMC Warta Zawiercie

National team
2021–2022; 2022–	Iran U19; Iran U21
Honours
Men's volleyball
Representing Iran
FIVB U19 World Championship
Bronze medal – third place	2021 Tehran
U20 Asian Championship
Gold medal – first place	2022 Riffa
FIVB U21 World Championship
Gold medal – first place	2023 Manama	Team

Mobin Nasri (born January 7, 2003, in Urmia) is a volleyball player from Iran. He won the world championship in the 2023 World Youth Championship with the Iranian under-21 volleyball team and was recognized as the best Outside hitter of the tournament. In 2023–24, he played for Paykan Tehran VC and in 2024–25, he joined the Polish team Aluron CMC Warta Zawiercie.
