= Agustín Loser =

Argentine volleyball player (born 1997)

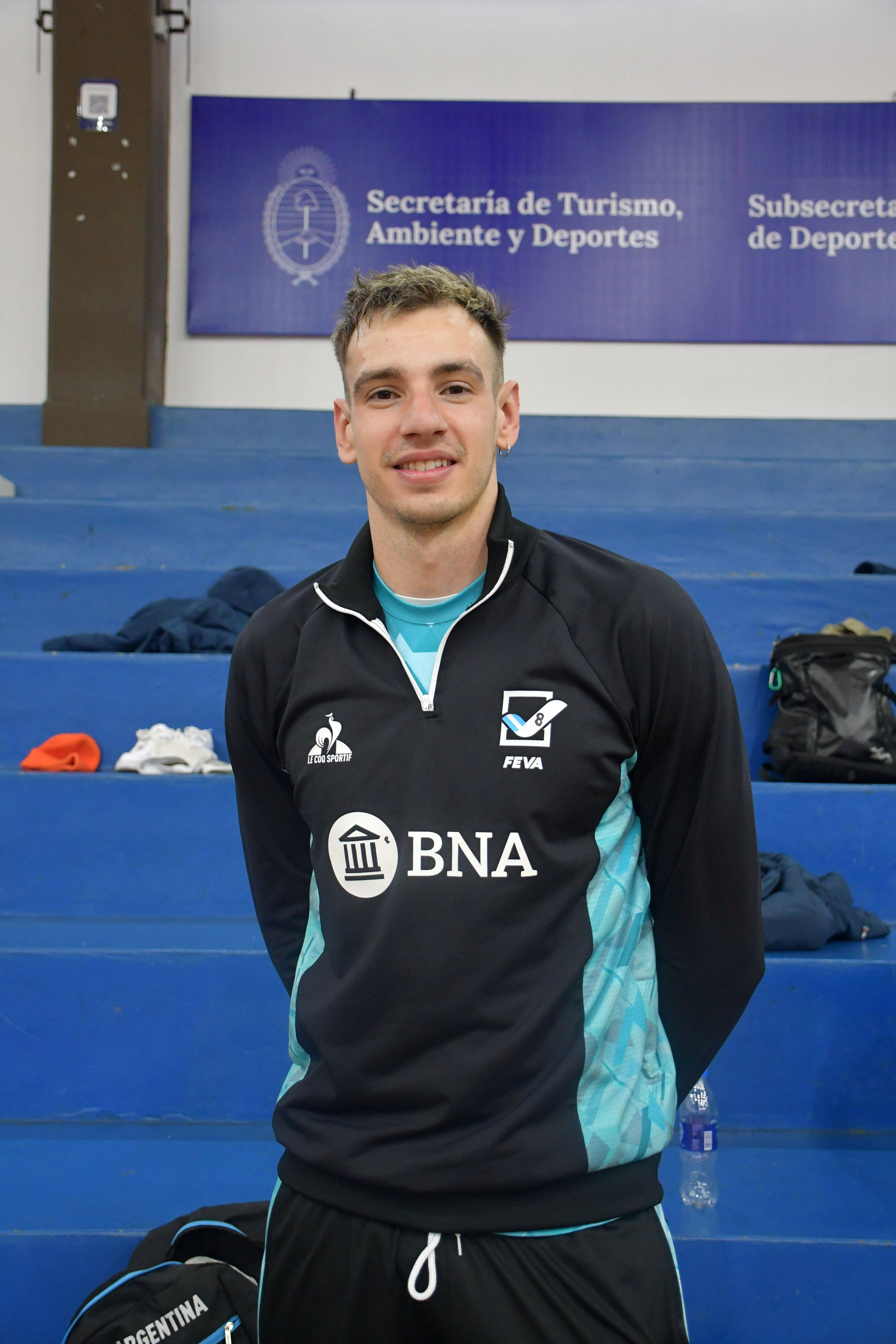
- Loser in 2024

Personal information
- Born: 12 October 1997 (age 29); General Alvear, Argentina
- Height: 1.97 m (6 ft 6 in)
- Weight: 77 kg (170 lb)
- Spike: 335 cm (132 in)
- Block: 310 cm (122 in)

Volleyball information
- Position: Middle blocker
- Current club: Sir Safety Perugia

Career
Years	Teams
2015–2018; 2018–2020; 2020–2022; 2022–2024; 2024–	Ciudad Vóley; Bolívar Vóley; Tourcoing LM; Allianz Milano; Sir Safety Perugia

National team
2018–	Argentina
Honours
Men's volleyball
Representing Argentina
Olympic Games
Bronze medal – third place	2020 Tokyo
CSV South American Championship
Gold medal – first place	2023 Recife
Silver medal – second place	2019 Chile
Silver medal – second place	2021 Brasília

Agustín Loser (born 12 October 1997) is an Argentine professional volleyball player who plays as a middle blocker for Sir Safety Perugia and the Argentina national team. He won a bronze medal in the men's tournament at the Olympic Games Tokyo 2020.

== Honours ==
=== Club ===
- FIVB Club World Championship
  - 2025, with Sir Sicoma Perugia
- CEV Champions League
  - 2024–25 – with Sir Sicoma Monini Perugia
- Domestic
  - 2017–18 Argentine Cup, with Ciudad Vóley
  - 2018–19 Argentine Championship, with Bolívar Vóley
  - 2024–25 Italian SuperCup, with Sir Safety Perugia

=== Youth national team ===
- 2014 CSV U19 South American Championship
- 2015 FIVB U19 World Championship
- 2016 CSV U23 South American Championship
- 2016 CSV U21 South American Championship
- 2017 FIVB U23 World Championship

=== Individual awards ===
- 2016: CSV U21 South American Championship – Best middle blocker
- 2018: Argentine Championship – Best middle blocker
- 2021: CSV South American Championship – Best middle blocker
