= 2023 FIVB Volleyball Men's U21 World Championship =

بطولة العالم للكرة الطائرة للرجال تحت 21 عامًا 2023

Tournament details
- Host country: Bahrain
- City: Manama
- Dates: 7–16 July 2023
- Teams: 16 (from 5 confederations)
- Venues: 2 (in 1 host city)

Final positions
- Champions: Iran (2nd title)
- Runners-up: Italy
- Third place: Bulgaria
- Fourth place: Argentina

Tournament awards
- MVP: (Iran) Amir Mohammad Golzadeh
- Best Setter: (Iran) Arshia Behnezhad
- Best OH: (Iran) Mobin Nasri (Italy) Mattia Orioli
- Best MB: (Italy) Filippo Bartolucci (Bulgaria) Lazar Bouchkov
- Best OPP: (Iran) Amir Mohammad Golzadeh
- Best Libero: (Italy) Gabriele Laurenzano

Tournament statistics
- Matches played: 64
- Attendance: 12,175 (190 per match)

The 2023 FIVB Volleyball Men's U21 World Championship was the 22nd edition of the FIVB Volleyball Men's U21 World Championship, the biennial international junior volleyball championship contested by the men's national teams under the age of 21 of the members associations of the FIVB (FIVB), the sport's global governing body. It was held in Manama, Bahrain from 7 to 16 July 2023.

Athletes must born on or after 1 January 2003.

Italy were the defending champions but failed to defend their title. Iran claimed their second title of U21 World Championship by defeating Italy 3–2 in the final match. Bulgaria hammered out a 3–0 shutout of Argentina to earn the bronze medals. Amir Mohammad Golzadeh from Iran was chosen to be the MVP of the tournament.

== Host selection ==
On 2 June 2022, FIVB opened the bidding process for member associations whose countries were interested in hosting one of the four Age Group World Championships in 2023 (i.e., Boys' and Girls' U19 World Championships and Men's and Women's U21 World Championships). The expression of interest of the member associations had to be submitted to FIVB by 29 July 2022, 18:00 CEST (UTC+2).

FIVB announced the hosts for its four Age Group World Championship on 24 January 2023, with Bahrain being selected to host the 2023 Boys' U21 World Championship. This will be the fourth time that Bahrain hosts the FIVB Boys' U21 World Championship having previously done so in 1987, 1997 and 2019.

== Qualification ==
A total of 16 national teams qualified for the final tournament. In addition to Bahrain who qualified automatically as the host, 10 other teams qualified through five separate continental competitions which were required to be held by 31 December 2022 at the latest. The remaining 5 teams entered to the competition by the Men's U21 FIVB World Ranking among the teams not yet qualified.

The slot allocation was set as follows:

- AVC (Asia & Oceania): 2
- CAVB (Africa): 2
- CEV (Europe): 2
- CSV (South America): 2
- NORCECA (North, Central America and Caribbean): 2
- Host: 1
- Top teams not yet qualified as per Men's U21 FIVB World Ranking: 5

Confederation	Qualifying tournament	Team qualified	Appearances			Previous best performance
Confederation	Qualifying tournament	Team qualified	Total	First	Last	Previous best performance
AVC (Asia & Oceania)	2022 Asian Men's U20 Championship ( (Bahrain) Riffa, 22–29 August)	Iran	14th	1993	2021	Champions (2019)
AVC (Asia & Oceania)	2022 Asian Men's U20 Championship ( (Bahrain) Riffa, 22–29 August)	India	8th	1981	2013	Fourth place (2009)
AVC (Asia & Oceania)	Men's U21 FIVB World Ranking	Thailand	3rd	1999	2021	Ninth place (1999)
AVC (Asia & Oceania)	Host nation	Bahrain	6th	1987	2021	Eighth place (1987, 2019)
CAVB (Africa)	2022 Men's U21 African Nations Championship ( (Tunisia) Tunis, 13–23 August)	Egypt	14th	1981	2021	Ninth place (2003)
CAVB (Africa)	2022 Men's U21 African Nations Championship ( (Tunisia) Tunis, 13–23 August)	Tunisia	13th	1985	2019	Ninth place (1999, 2005)
CEV (Europe)	2022 Men's U20 European Championship ( (Italy) Montesilvano and Vasto, 17–25 September)	Italy	16th	1985	2021	Champions (2021)
CEV (Europe)	2022 Men's U20 European Championship ( (Italy) Montesilvano and Vasto, 17–25 September)	Poland	12th	1989	2021	Champions (1997, 2003, 2017)
CEV (Europe)	Men's U21 FIVB World Ranking	Belgium	4th	2009	2021	Fifth place (2021)
CEV (Europe)	Men's U21 FIVB World Ranking	Bulgaria	10th	1985	2021	Champions (1991)
CEV (Europe)	Men's U21 FIVB World Ranking	Czech Republic	4th	2017	2021	Eighth place (2021)
CSV (South America)	2022 Men's Junior South American Championship ( (Peru) Tacna, 14–18 September)	Brazil	22nd	1977	2021	Champions (1993, 2001, 2007, 2009)
CSV (South America)	2022 Men's Junior South American Championship ( (Peru) Tacna, 14–18 September)	Argentina	17th	1977	2021	Runners-up (2011, 2015)
NORCECA (North, Central America and Caribbean)	2022 Men's Junior Pan-American Cup ( (Cuba) Havana, 1–8 October)	United States	10th	1977	2017	Fourth place (2011)
NORCECA (North, Central America and Caribbean)	2022 Men's Junior Pan-American Cup ( (Cuba) Havana, 1–8 October)	Mexico	8th	1977	2015	Fourth place (1977)
NORCECA (North, Central America and Caribbean)	Men's U21 FIVB World Ranking	Canada	13th	1977	2021	Fifth place (1999)

== Pools composition ==
The draw for the pools composition was held on 31 March 2023 at the FIVB headquarters in Lausanne, Switzerland. The 16 teams were split into four pools of four. The hosts Bahrain and the top seven teams of the Men's U21 FIVB World Ranking in force at that time (as of 24 October 2022) were seeded in the first two positions of each pool following the serpentine system. FIVB reserved the right to seed the host team as head of pool A regardless of their position in the World Ranking. The remaining 8 teams were divided into three pots of four, according to their position in the same Boys' U19 FIVB World Ranking, in order to be drawn to complete the following two positions in each pool.

Men's U21 FIVB World Ranking of each team as of 24 October 2022 are shown in brackets, except the hosts Bahrain who ranked 23rd.

Seeded teams		Teams to be drawn	
Line 1	Line 2	Pot 1 (line 3)	Pot 2 (line 4)
Bahrain (Hosts, assigned to A1); Italy (1), assigned to B1; Poland (2), assigned to C1; Argentina (3), assigned to D1	Belgium (5), assigned to D2; Bulgaria (6), assigned to C2; Brazil (7), assigned to B2; Iran (8), assigned to A2	Egypt (9); Canada (10); Czech Republic (11); Thailand (12)	United States (14); Tunisia (15); India (15); Mexico (15)

The draw procedure also followed the serpentine system and was as follows:

- Teams from pot 1 were drawn first and were placed in line 3 of each pool starting from pool A to pool D.
- Teams from pot 2 were then drawn and placed in line 4 of each pool starting from pool D to pool A.

The pools composition after the draw was as follow:

Pool A
Pos	Team
A1	Bahrain
A2	Iran
A3	Thailand
A4	Tunisia

Pool B
Pos	Team
B1	Italy
B2	Brazil
B3	Egypt
B4	Mexico

Pool C
Pos	Team
C1	Poland
C2	Bulgaria
C3	Canada
C4	India

Pool D
Pos	Team
D1	Argentina
D2	Belgium
D3	Czech Republic
D4	United States

== Format ==
Teams will play round-robin in each pool. The top two teams from each pool will advance to round-robin pools E and F of the second phase, while the rest will move to pools G and H to continue the battles for classification from eighth to 16th. The winners and runners-up of pools E and F will progress to the semifinals and eventually determine the medallists.

== First round ==
- All times are Arabia Standard Time (UTC+3:00).

=== Pool A ===
Pos	Team	Pld	W	L	Pts	SW	SL	SR	SPW	SPL	SPR	Qualification
1	Iran	3	3	0	8	9	3	3.000	207	168	1.232	Pool E
2	Thailand	3	2	1	5	7	6	1.167	267	290	0.921	Pool E
3	Bahrain	3	1	2	4	5	6	0.833	182	164	1.110	Pool G
4	Tunisia	3	0	3	1	3	9	0.333	245	279	0.878	Pool G

Source: Match Results

Date	Time		Score		Set 1	Set 2	Set 3	Set 4	Set 5	Total	Report
7 Jul	17:00	Thailand	1–3	Iran	5–25	25–23	13–25	21–25		64–98	P2 Report
7 Jul	20:00	Tunisia	0–3	Bahrain	22–25	12–25	22–25			56–75	P2 Report
8 Jul	17:00	Iran	3–2	Tunisia	22–25	22–25	25–21	25–22	15–11	109–104	P2 Report
8 Jul	20:00	Bahrain	2–3	Thailand	24–26	25–21	25–21	21–25	12–15	107–108	P2 Report
9 Jul	17:00	Tunisia	1–3	Thailand	25–20	17–25	22–25	21–25		85–95	P2 Report
9 Jul	20:00	Iran	3–0	Bahrain	25–11	25–19	25–19			75–49	P2 Report

=== Pool B ===
Pos	Team	Pld	W	L	Pts	SW	SL	SR	SPW	SPL	SPR	Qualification
1	Brazil	3	3	0	9	9	1	9.000	147	183	0.803	Pool F
2	Italy	3	2	1	6	7	3	2.333	236	199	1.186	Pool F
3	Egypt	3	1	2	3	3	7	0.429	188	223	0.843	Pool H
4	Mexico	3	0	3	0	1	9	0.111	179	245	0.731	Pool H

Source: Match Results

Date	Time		Score		Set 1	Set 2	Set 3	Set 4	Set 5	Total	Report
7 Jul	11:00	Mexico	0–3	Italy	26–28	14–25	16–25			56–78	P2 Report
7 Jul	14:00	Egypt	0–3	Brazil	15–25	15–25	20–25			50–75	P2 Report
8 Jul	11:00	Egypt	0–3	Italy	18–25	16–25	12–25			46–75	P2 Report
8 Jul	14:00	Brazil	3–0	Mexico	25–12	25–17	25–21			75–50	P2 Report
9 Jul	11:00	Brazil	3–1	Italy	25–18	22–25	25–22	25–18		97–83	P2 Report
9 Jul	14:00	Mexico	1–3	Egypt	13–25	20–25	25–17	15–25		73–92	P2 Report

=== Pool C ===
Pos	Team	Pld	W	L	Pts	SW	SL	SR	SPW	SPL	SPR	Qualification
1	Bulgaria	3	3	0	8	9	4	2.250	312	270	1.156	Pool E
2	Poland	3	2	1	7	8	4	2.000	274	240	1.142	Pool E
3	Canada	3	1	2	3	4	7	0.571	231	267	0.865	Pool G
4	India	3	0	3	0	3	9	0.333	253	293	0.863	Pool G

Source: Match Results

Date	Time		Score		Set 1	Set 2	Set 3	Set 4	Set 5	Total	Report
7 Jul	11:00	India	1–3	Poland	17–25	14–25	25–20	19–25		75–95	P2 Report
7 Jul	14:00	Canada	1–3	Bulgaria	12–25	25–21	20–25	25–27		82–98	P2 Report
8 Jul	11:00	Canada	0–3	Poland	14–25	17–25	21–25			52–75	P2 Report
8 Jul	14:00	Bulgaria	3–1	India	25–19	22–25	29–27	25–13		101–84	P2 Report
9 Jul	11:00	Bulgaria	3–2	Poland	25–23	26–28	25–17	22–25	15–11	113–104	P2 Report
9 Jul	14:00	India	1–3	Canada	25–18	27–29	20–25	22–25		94–97	P2 Report

=== Pool D ===
Pos	Team	Pld	W	L	Pts	SW	SL	SR	SPW	SPL	SPR	Qualification
1	Argentina	3	3	0	8	9	3	3.000	287	258	1.112	Pool F
2	Belgium	3	2	1	7	8	4	2.000	268	263	1.019	Pool F
3	Czech Republic	3	1	2	3	4	7	0.571	252	265	0.951	Pool H
4	United States	3	0	3	0	2	9	0.222	243	264	0.920	Pool H

Source: Match Results

Date	Time		Score		Set 1	Set 2	Set 3	Set 4	Set 5	Total	Report
7 Jul	17:00	United States	0–3	Argentina	22–25	19–25	23–25			64–75	P2 Report
7 Jul	20:00	Czech Republic	0–3	Belgium	20–25	20–25	22–25			62–75	P2 Report
8 Jul	17:00	Czech Republic	1–3	Argentina	26–24	18–25	25–27	23–25		92–101	P2 Report
8 Jul	20:00	Belgium	3–1	United States	25–23	16–25	25–22	25–20		91–90	P2 Report
9 Jul	17:00	Belgium	2–3	Argentina	25–18	30–28	15–25	23–25	9–15	102–111	P2 Report
9 Jul	20:00	United States	1–3	Czech Republic	19–25	25–23	23–25	22–25		89–98	P2 Report

== Second round ==
- All times are Arabia Standard Time (UTC+3:00).

=== Pool E ===
Pos	Team	Pld	W	L	Pts	SW	SL	SR	SPW	SPL	SPR	Qualification
1	Iran	3	3	0	9	9	1	9.000	248	196	1.265	Semifinals
2	Bulgaria	3	2	1	6	7	3	2.333	247	227	1.088	Semifinals
3	Poland	3	1	2	3	3	6	0.500	207	211	0.981	5th–8th semifinals
4	Thailand	3	0	3	0	0	9	0.000	157	225	0.698	5th–8th semifinals

Source: Match Results

Date	Time		Score		Set 1	Set 2	Set 3	Set 4	Set 5	Total	Report
11 Jul	14:00	Iran	3–0	Poland	25–17	25–23	25–23			75–63	P2 Report
11 Jul	17:00	Bulgaria	3–0	Thailand	25–21	25–18	25–21			75–60	P2 Report
12 Jul	14:00	Bulgaria	3–0	Poland	25–18	35–33	25–18			85–69	P2 Report
12 Jul	17:00	Iran	3–0	Thailand	25–11	25–16	25–19			75–46	P2 Report
13 Jul	14:00	Thailand	0–3	Poland	16–25	17–25	18–25			51–75	P2 Report
13 Jul	17:00	Iran	3–1	Bulgaria	25–17	23–25	25–22	25–23		98–87	P2 Report

=== Pool F ===
Pos	Team	Pld	W	L	Pts	SW	SL	SR	SPW	SPL	SPR	Qualification
1	Italy	3	3	0	8	9	3	3.000	278	248	1.121	Semifinals
2	Argentina	3	2	1	5	6	5	1.200	166	181	0.917	Semifinals
3	Brazil	3	1	2	3	4	7	0.571	195	191	1.021	5th–8th semifinals
4	Belgium	3	0	3	2	5	9	0.556	294	313	0.939	5th–8th semifinals

Source: Match Results

Date	Time		Score		Set 1	Set 2	Set 3	Set 4	Set 5	Total	Report
11 Jul	17:00	Brazil	3–1	Belgium	25–23	25–21	22–25	25–23		97–92	P2 Report
11 Jul	20:00	Argentina	0–3	Italy	18–25	21–25	15–25			54–75	P2 Report
12 Jul	17:00	Brazil	1–3	Italy	23–25	29–31	25–18	21–25		98–99	P2 Report
12 Jul	20:00	Argentina	3–2	Belgium	21–25	25–21	23–25	28–26	15–9	112–106	P2 Report
13 Jul	17:00	Italy	3–2	Belgium	23–25	25–18	25–19	16–25	15–9	104–96	P2 Report
13 Jul	20:00	Brazil	0–3	Argentina	23–25	23–25	18–25			64–75	P2 Report

=== Pool G ===
Pos	Team	Pld	W	L	Pts	SW	SL	SR	SPW	SPL	SPR	Qualification
1	Canada	3	3	0	9	9	3	3.000	286	251	1.139	9th–12th semifinals
2	India	3	1	2	4	6	6	1.000	262	257	1.019	9th–12th semifinals
3	Bahrain	3	1	2	3	6	8	0.750	298	207	1.440	13th–16th semifinals
4	Tunisia	3	1	2	2	4	8	0.500	238	269	0.885	13th–16th semifinals

Source: Match Results

Date	Time		Score		Set 1	Set 2	Set 3	Set 4	Set 5	Total	Report
11 Jul	11:00	Canada	3–1	Tunisia	25–22	17–25	25–22	25–18		92–87	P2 Report
11 Jul	20:00	Bahrain	3–2	India	23–25	28–26	21–25	25–20	15–11	112–107	P2 Report
12 Jul	11:00	Canada	3–1	India	25–22	23–25	25–12	25–21		98–80	P2 Report
12 Jul	20:00	Bahrain	2–3	Tunisia	21–25	25–21	25–18	19–25	12–15	102–104	P2 Report
13 Jul	11:00	Tunisia	0–3	India	15–25	19–25	13–25			47–75	P2 Report
13 Jul	20:00	Bahrain	1–3	Canada	22–25	18–25	31–29	18–25		89–104	P2 Report

=== Pool H ===
Pos	Team	Pld	W	L	Pts	SW	SL	SR	SPW	SPL	SPR	Qualification
1	Czech Republic	3	3	0	9	9	1	9.000	242	185	1.308	9th–12th semifinals
2	Egypt	3	2	1	6	7	5	1.400	285	262	1.088	9th–12th semifinals
3	Mexico	3	1	2	3	4	7	0.571	233	271	0.860	13th–16th semifinals
4	United States	3	0	3	0	2	9	0.222	226	268	0.843	13th–16th semifinals

Source: Match Results

Date	Time		Score		Set 1	Set 2	Set 3	Set 4	Set 5	Total	Report
11 Jul	11:00	Egypt	3–1	United States	25–20	25–20	22–25	25–20		97–85	P2 Report
11 Jul	14:00	Czech Republic	3–0	Mexico	25–16	25–14	25–22			75–52	P2 Report
12 Jul	11:00	Egypt	3–1	Mexico	25–12	25–15	22–25	35–33		107–85	P2 Report
12 Jul	14:00	Czech Republic	3–0	United States	25–19	25–16	25–17			75–52	P2 Report
13 Jul	11:00	Mexico	3–1	United States	25–18	26–24	20–25	25–22		96–89	P2 Report
13 Jul	14:00	Egypt	1–3	Czech Republic	13–25	18–25	25–15	25–27		81–92	P2 Report

== Final round ==
- All times are Arabia Standard Time (UTC+3:00).

=== 13th–16th places ===
13th–16th semifinals
15 July
Bahrain	1
United States	3
15 July
Mexico	3
Tunisia	1

13th place match
16 July
United States	3
Mexico	0
15th place match
16 July
Bahrain	3
Tunisia	0

==== 13th–16th semifinals ====
Date	Time		Score		Set 1	Set 2	Set 3	Set 4	Set 5	Total	Report
15 Jul	11:00	Bahrain	1–3	United States	18–25	22–25	25–22	21–25		86–97	P2 Report
15 Jul	14:00	Mexico	3–1	Tunisia	25–21	22–25	25–21	25–22		97–89	P2 Report

==== 15th place match ====
Date	Time		Score		Set 1	Set 2	Set 3	Set 4	Set 5	Total	Report
16 Jul	11:00	Bahrain	3–0	Tunisia	25–19	25–16	25–17			75–52	P2 Report

==== 13th place match ====
Date	Time		Score		Set 1	Set 2	Set 3	Set 4	Set 5	Total	Report
16 Jul	14:00	United States	3–0	Mexico	25–15	25–21	25–18			75–54	P2 Report

=== 9th–12th places ===
9th–12th semifinals
15 July
Czech Republic	3
India	1
15 July
Canada	1
Egypt	3

9th place match
16 July
Czech Republic	1
Egypt	3
11th place match
16 July
India	0
Canada	3

==== 9th–12th semifinals ====
Date	Time		Score		Set 1	Set 2	Set 3	Set 4	Set 5	Total	Report
15 Jul	17:00	Czech Republic	3–1	India	27–25	23–25	25–18	25–17		100–85	P2 Report
15 Jul	20:00	Canada	1–3	Egypt	27–25	22–25	23–25	15–25		87–100	P2 Report

==== 11th place match ====
Date	Time		Score		Set 1	Set 2	Set 3	Set 4	Set 5	Total	Report
16 Jul	17:00	India	0–3	Canada	19–25	21–25	29–31			69–81	P2 Report

==== 9th place match ====
Date	Time		Score		Set 1	Set 2	Set 3	Set 4	Set 5	Total	Report
16 Jul	20:00	Czech Republic	1–3	Egypt	23–25	25–22	18–25	14–25		80–97	P2 Report

=== 5th–8th places ===
5th–8th semifinals
15 July
Poland	3
Belgium	0
15 July
Brazil	3
Thailand	0

5th place match
16 July
Poland	3
Brazil	1
7th place match
16 July
Belgium	3
Thailand	0

==== 5th–8th semifinals ====
Date	Time		Score		Set 1	Set 2	Set 3	Set 4	Set 5	Total	Report
15 Jul	11:00	Poland	3–0	Belgium	25–19	25–19	27–25			77–63	P2 Report
15 Jul	14:00	Brazil	3–0	Thailand	25–17	25–18	25–15			75–50	P2 Report

==== 7th place match ====
Date	Time		Score		Set 1	Set 2	Set 3	Set 4	Set 5	Total	Report
16 Jul	11:00	Belgium	3–0	Thailand	27–25	25–21	25–16			77–62	P2 Report

==== 5th place match ====
Date	Time		Score		Set 1	Set 2	Set 3	Set 4	Set 5	Total	Report
16 Jul	14:00	Poland	3–1	Brazil	25–22	21–25	25–17	25–22		96–86	P2 Report

=== Final four ===
Semifinals
15 July
Italy	3
Bulgaria	1
15 July
Iran	3
Argentina	1

Final
16 July
Italy	2
Iran	3
3rd place match
16 July
Bulgaria	3
Argentina	0

==== Semifinals ====
Date	Time		Score		Set 1	Set 2	Set 3	Set 4	Set 5	Total	Report
15 Jul	17:00	Italy	3–1	Bulgaria	23–25	25–22	25–23	25–18		98–88	P2 Report
15 Jul	20:00	Iran	3–1	Argentina	23–25	25–21	25–21	25–20		98–87	P2 Report

==== 3rd place match ====
Date	Time		Score		Set 1	Set 2	Set 3	Set 4	Set 5	Total	Report
16 Jul	17:00	Bulgaria	3–0	Argentina	25–22	28–26	25–19			78–67	P2 Report

==== Final ====
Date	Time		Score		Set 1	Set 2	Set 3	Set 4	Set 5	Total	Report
16 Jul	20:00	Italy	2–3	Iran	20–25	25–23	25–23	16–25	9–15	95–111	P2 Report

== Final standing ==
Rank	Team
1st place, gold medalist(s)	Iran
2nd place, silver medalist(s)	Italy
3rd place, bronze medalist(s)	Bulgaria
4	Argentina
5	Poland
6	Brazil
7	Belgium
8	Thailand
9	Egypt
10	Czech Republic
11	Canada
12	India
13	United States
14	Mexico
15	Bahrain
16	Tunisia

2023 Men's U21 World champions

Iran
2nd title

12–man roster
Sajad Jelodarian, Mahdi Bayati, Porya Hosseinpour, Mobin Nasri, Younes Javan, Amir Mohammad Golzadeh, Poriya Hossein Khanzadeh, Shayan Sepehri Fard, Pendar Momeni Moghaddam, Erfan Norouzi (c), Arshia Behnezhad, Ali Haghparast
Head coach
Gholamreza Momeni Moghaddam

== Awards ==
- Most valuable player
  (Iran) Amir Mohammad Golzadeh
- Best setter
  (Iran) Arshia Behnezhad
- Best outside spikers
  (Iran) Mobin Nasri
  (Italy) Mattia Orioli
- Best middle blockers
  (Italy) Filippo Bartolucci
  (Bulgaria) Lazar Bouchkov
- Best opposite spiker
  (Iran) Amir Mohammad Golzadeh
- Best libero
  (Italy) Gabriele Laurenzano

== See also ==
- 2023 FIVB Volleyball Women's U21 World Championship
