= Fernando Kreling =

Brazilian volleyball player (born 1996)

Personal information
- Full name: Fernando Gil Kreling
- Nickname: Cachopa
- Born: 13 January 1996 (age 30); Caxias do Sul, Brazil
- Height: 1.85 m (6 ft 1 in)
- Weight: 85 kg (187 lb)
- Spike: 320 cm (126 in)
- Block: 302 cm (119 in)

Volleyball information
- Position: Setter
- Current club: Allianz Milano

Career
Years	Teams
2015–2022; 2022–2025; 2025–	Sada Cruzeiro; Vero Volley Monza; Allianz Milano

National team
Brazil
Honours
Men's volleyball
Representing Brazil
FIVB World Championship
Bronze medal – third place	2022 Poland/Slovenia
FIVB World Cup
Gold medal – first place	2019 Japan
FIVB Nations League
Gold medal – first place	2021 Rimini
Bronze medal – third place	2025 Ningbo
Pan American Cup
Gold medal – first place	2015 Reno
CSV South American Championship
Gold medal – first place	2019 Chile
Gold medal – first place	2021 Brasília
Silver medal – second place	2023 Recife

Fernando Gil Kreling (born 13 January 1996) is a Brazilian professional volleyball player who plays as a setter for Allianz Milano and the Brazil national team. Kreling took part in the Olympic Games Tokyo 2020 and is the 2019 World Cup winner.

== Honours ==
=== Club ===
- FIVB Club World Championship
  - Betim 2015 – with Sada Cruzeiro
  - Betim 2016 – with Sada Cruzeiro
  - Betim 2019 – with Sada Cruzeiro
  - Betim 2021 – with Sada Cruzeiro
- CSV South American Club Championship
  - Taubate 2016 – with Sada Cruzeiro
  - Montes Claros 2017 – with Sada Cruzeiro
  - Montes Claros 2018 – with Sada Cruzeiro
  - Belo Horizonte 2019 – with Sada Cruzeiro
  - Contagem 2020 – with Sada Cruzeiro
  - Contagem 2022 – with Sada Cruzeiro
- CEV Challenge Cup
  - 2023–24 – with Vero Volley Monza
- Domestic
  - 2015–16 Brazilian SuperCup, with Sada Cruzeiro
  - 2015–16 Brazilian Cup, with Sada Cruzeiro
  - 2015–16 Brazilian Championship, with Sada Cruzeiro
  - 2016–17 Brazilian SuperCup, with Sada Cruzeiro
  - 2016–17 Brazilian Championship, with Sada Cruzeiro
  - 2017–18 Brazilian SuperCup, with Sada Cruzeiro
  - 2017–18 Brazilian Cup, with Sada Cruzeiro
  - 2017–18 Brazilian Championship, with Sada Cruzeiro
  - 2018–19 Brazilian Cup, with Sada Cruzeiro
  - 2019–20 Brazilian Cup, with Sada Cruzeiro
  - 2020–21 Brazilian Cup, with Sada Cruzeiro
  - 2021–22 Brazilian SuperCup, with Sada Cruzeiro
  - 2021–22 Brazilian Championship, with Sada Cruzeiro

=== Youth national team ===
- 2011 CSV U17 South American Championship
- 2012 CSV U19 South American Championship
- 2013 FIVB U23 World Championship
- 2014 CSV U21 South American Championship
- 2014 CSV U23 South American Championship
- 2015 U21 Pan American Cup
- 2016 CSV U23 South American Championship

=== Individual awards ===
- 2011: CSV U17 South American Championship – Best setter
- 2012: CSV U19 South American Championship – Best setter
- 2014: CSV U21 South American Championship – Best setter
- 2016: CSV U23 South American Championship – Best setter
- 2020: CSV South American Club Championship – Most valuable player
