= 2022 Men's Junior South American Volleyball Championship =

International volleyball tournament

2022 Men's U21 South American Championship
Tournament details
- Host country: Peru
- City: Tacna
- Dates: 14–18 September
- Teams: 5 (from 1 confederation)
- Venue: (in 1 host city)

Final positions
- Champions: Brazil (20th title)

The 2022 Men's U21 Volleyball South American Championship was the 25th edition of the Men's Junior South American Volleyball Championship, organised by South America's governing volleyball body, the CSV. The tournament was held in Tacna, Peru from 14 to 18 September 2022. The top two teams of the tournament qualified for the 2023 FIVB Volleyball Men's U21 World Championship as the CSV representatives.

Players must be born on or after 1 January 2003.

== Competing nations ==
- Hosts
  - Peru
- Qualified teams
  - Argentina
  - Bolivia
  - Brazil
  - Chile
  - ~~Colombia~~ (Note: Colombia was scheduled to participate in this tournament but withdraw later.)

== Format ==
Teams will play against each other in a full Round-robin tournament. The top 2 teams qualified to 2023 FIVB Volleyball Men's U21 World Championship.

== Pool standing procedure ==
1. Number of matches won
2. Match points
3. Sets ratio
4. Points ratio
5. If the tie continues as per the point ratio between two teams, the priority will be given to the team which won the match between them. When the tie in points ratio is between three or more teams, a new classification of these teams in the terms of points 1, 2, 3 and 4 will be made taking into consideration only the matches in which they were opposed to each other.

Match won 3–0 or 3–1: 3 match points for the winner, 0 match points for the loser
Match won 3–2: 2 match points for the winner, 1 match point for the loser

== Round Robin ==
- All times are Peru Time (UTC−05:00).

Pos	Team	Pld	W	L	Pts	SW	SL	SR	SPW	SPL	SPR	Qualification
1	Brazil	4	4	0	12	12	0	MAX	304	194	1.567	2023 U21 World Championship
2	Argentina	4	3	1	9	9	3	3.000	291	196	1.485	2023 U21 World Championship
3	Chile	4	2	2	6	6	7	0.857	276	290	0.952	
4	Peru	4	1	3	3	3	10	0.300	212	307	0.691	
5	Bolivia	4	0	4	0	2	12	0.167	247	343	0.720	

Day 1

14 September 2022; 18:00	Argentina	3−0	Chile
14 September 2022; 18:00	(25−20,25−16,25−18)

14 September 2022; 20:00	Peru	3−1	Bolivia
14 September 2022; 20:00	(25−16,25−18,19−25,25−23)

Day 2

15 September 2022; 18:00	Bolivia	0−3	Brazil
15 September 2022; 18:00	(11−25,15−25,16−25)

15 September 2022; 20:00	Argentina	3−0	Peru
15 September 2022; 20:00	(25−13,25−5,25−6)

Day 3

16 September 2022; 18:00	Argentina	3−0	Bolivia
16 September 2022; 18:00	(25−18,25−9,25−12)

16 September 2022; 20:00	Brazil	3−0	Chile
16 September 2022; 20:00	(25−13,25−23,25−12)

Day 4

17 September 2022; 18:00	Chile	3−1	Bolivia
17 September 2022; 18:00	(24−26,25−17,25−18,25−23)

17 September 2022; 20:00	Peru	0−3	Brazil
17 September 2022; 20:00	(13−25,9−25,16−25)

Day 5

18 September 2022; 15:00	Peru	0−3	Chile
18 September 2022; 15:00	(20−25,21−25,15−25)

18 September 2022; 17:00	Brazil	3−0	Argentina
18 September 2022; 17:00	(29−27,25−19,25−20)

== Awards ==
- Most valuable player
  (Brazil) Arthur Bento
- Best setter
  (Brazil) Gustavo Cardoso
- Best outside spikers
  (Brazil) Arthur Bento
  (Peru) Leonel Despaigne
- Best middle blockers
  (Brazil) Maicon Dos Santos
  (Argentina) Imanol Salazar
- Best opposite spiker
  (Argentina) Germán Gómez
- Best libero
  (Brazil) Filipe Baioco
