= Time in Bahrain =

UTC+03:00 zone.

Time in Bahrain is set by Arabia Standard Time (AST, corresponding to UTC+03:00), in keeping with neighbouring countries of the Gulf Cooperation Council Saudi Arabia and Qatar. Bahrain does not observe daylight saving time.

The country receives a minimum of 10 and a half hours of sunlight a day in the winter, with this extending to 13 hours and 47 minutes in the summer solstice.
