= Douglas Souza =

Brazilian volleyball player (born 1995)

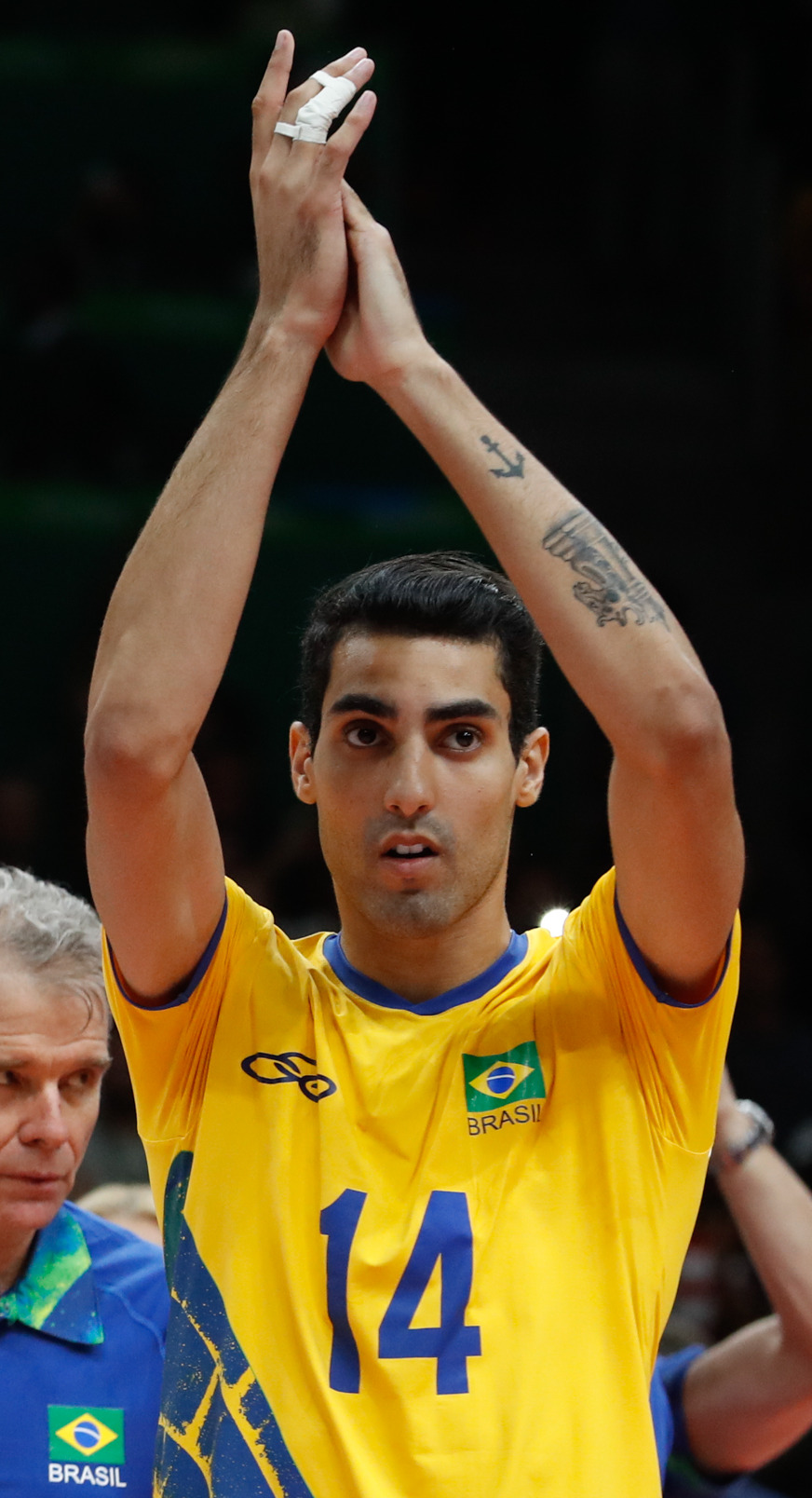
- Souza in 2016

Personal information
- Full name: Douglas Correia de Souza
- Nationality: (Brazil) Brazilian
- Born: 20 August 1995 (age 31); Santa Bárbara d'Oeste, SP, Brazil
- Height: 1.99 m (6 ft 6 in)
- Weight: 75 kg (165 lb)
- Spike: 338 cm (133 in)
- Block: 317 cm (125 in)

Volleyball information
- Position: Outside hitter

Career
Years	Teams
2012–2013; 2013–2014; 2014–2018; 2018–2021; 2021–2022; 2023-	(Brazil) EC Pinheiros (Brazil) Brasil Vôlei Clube (Brazil) SESI São Paulo (Brazil) Vôlei Taubaté (Italy) Volley Callipo (Brazil) Farma Condé Vôlei

National team
2014–2021	Brazil
Honours
Men's volleyball
Representing Brazil
Olympic Games
Gold medal – first place	2016 Rio de Janeiro
FIVB World Championship
Silver medal – second place	2018 Italy/Bulgaria
FIVB World Cup
Gold medal – first place	2019 Japan
FIVB World Grand Champions Cup
Gold medal – first place	2017 Japan
FIVB Nations League
Gold medal – first place	2021 Rimini
FIVB World League
Silver medal – second place	2014 Florence
Silver medal – second place	2016 Kraków
Pan American Games
Silver medal – second place	2015 Toronto
Pan American Cup
Gold medal – first place	2015 Reno
CSV South American Championship
Gold medal – first place	2017 Chile
Gold medal – first place	2019 Chile

Douglas Correia de Souza (born 20 August 1995) is a Brazilian volleyball player, veteran member of the Brazil men's national volleyball team, 2016 Olympic Champion, silver medallist of the 2014 World Championship, gold medallist of the 2019 World Cup, two–time South American Champion (2017, 2019). On the club level, he plays for Farma Condé Vôlei.

== Personal life ==
He is openly gay.

== Sporting achievements ==
=== Clubs ===
- National championships
  - 2018/2019 Brazilian Championship, with Vôlei Taubaté
  - 2019/2020 Brazilian SuperCup, with Vôlei Taubaté
  - 2020/2021 Brazilian SuperCup, with Vôlei Taubaté
  - 2024/2025 Brazilian SuperCup, with Sada Cruzeiro Vôlei
- FIVB Club World Championship
  - 2024 – with Sada Cruzeiro

=== Youth national team ===
- 2011 CSV U17 South American Championship
- 2012 CSV U19 South American Championship
- 2013 FIVB U21 World Championship
- 2014 CSV U21 South American Championship
- 2014 CSV U23 South American Championship

=== Individual awards ===
- 2012: CSV U19 South American Championship – Best server
- 2014: CSV U21 South American Championship – Most valuable player
- 2014: CSV U23 South American Championship – Most valuable player
- 2015: Pan American Games – Best outside hitter
- 2018: FIVB World Championship – Best outside spiker
