= 2010 Men's Junior South American Volleyball Championship =

Volleyball tournament

Tournament details
- Host country: Chile
- City: Santiago
- Dates: 22 – 26 September
- Teams: 8 (from 1 confederation)
- Venue: 1 (in 1 host city)

Final positions
- Champions: Brazil (16th title)

Tournament awards
- MVP: (Brazil) Felipe Martins

The 2010 Men's Junior South American Volleyball Championship was the 20th edition of the tournament, organised by South America's governing volleyball body, the Confederación Sudamericana de Voleibol (CSV).

== Competing nations ==
The following national teams participated in the tournament; teams were seeded according to how they finished in the previous edition of the tournament:

Pool A	Pool B
Argentina (1st); Venezuela (3rd); Colombia (5th); Peru	Brazil (2nd); Chile (4th); Uruguay (6th); Paraguay (8th)

== First round ==
=== Pool A ===
Pos	Team	Pld	W	L	Pts	SW	SL	SR	SPW	SPL	SPR	Qualification
1	Argentina	3	3	0	6	0	0	—	0	0	—	Semifinals
2	Venezuela	3	2	1	5	0	0	—	0	0	—	Semifinals
3	Colombia	3	1	2	4	0	0	—	0	0	—	
4	Peru	3	0	3	3	0	0	—	0	0	—	

Date		Score		Set 1	Set 2	Set 3	Set 4	Set 5	Total
22 Set	Peru	0–3	Argentina	20–25	19–25	13–25			52–75
22 Set	Venezuela	3–2	Colombia	25–5	25–17	23–25	18–25	17–15	108–87
23 Set	Venezuela	3–0	Peru	25–11	25–16	25–20			75–47
23 Set	Argentina	3–0	Colombia	25–11	25–14	25–14			75–39
24 Set	Argentina	3–0	Venezuela	25–23	25–22	25–19			75–64
24 Set	Colombia	3–1	Peru	25–22	25–15	23–25	25–21		98–83

=== Pool B ===
Pos	Team	Pld	W	L	Pts	SW	SL	SR	SPW	SPL	SPR	Qualification
1	Brazil	3	3	0	6	9	0	MAX	225	135	1.667	Semifinals
2	Chile	3	2	1	5	6	3	2.000	205	149	1.376	Semifinals
3	Uruguay	3	1	2	4	3	6	0.500	170	211	0.806	
4	Paraguay	3	0	3	3	0	9	0.000	152	229	0.664	

Date		Score		Set 1	Set 2	Set 3	Set 4	Set 5	Total
22 Set	Chile	3–0	Paraguay	25–10	25–12	25–10			75–32
22 Set	Brazil	3–0	Uruguay	25–16	25–18	25–15			75–49
23 Set	Brazil	3–0	Paraguay	25–10	25–10	25–11			75–31
23 Set	Chile	3–0	Uruguay	25–13	25–12	25–17			75–42
24 Set	Uruguay	3–0	Paraguay	25–16	25–18	29–27			79–61
24 Set	Chile	0–3	Brazil	18–25	16–5	21–25			55–75

== Final round ==
=== 5th to 8th places bracket ===
5th to 8th Classification
2012-09-25 Santiago
Colombia	3
Paraguay	0
2012-09-25 Santiago
Uruguay	3
Peru	2

5th place match
2012-09-26 Santiago
Colombia	3
Uruguay	0
7th place match
2012-09-26 Santiago
Paraguay	0
Peru	3

=== Championship bracket ===
Semifinals
2012-09-25 Santiago
Argentina	3
Chile	0
2012-09-25 Santiago
Brazil	3
Venezuela	2

Final
2012-09-26 Santiago
Argentina	0
Brazil	3
Third place
2012-09-26 Santiago
Chile	1
Venezuela	3

=== Classification 5th to 8th ===
Date		Score		Set 1	Set 2	Set 3	Set 4	Set 5	Total
25 Set	Uruguay	3–2	Peru	19–25	23–25	25–20	28–26	15–13	110–109
25 Set	Colombia	3–0	Paraguay	25–10	25–17	25–18			75–45

=== Semifinals ===
Date		Score		Set 1	Set 2	Set 3	Set 4	Set 5	Total
25 Set	Brazil	3–2	Venezuela	25–16	25–23	20–25	16–25	15–13	101–102
25 Set	Argentina	3–0	Chile	25–17	25–19	25–15			75–51

=== 7th place match ===
Date		Score		Set 1	Set 2	Set 3	Set 4	Set 5	Total
26 Set	Paraguay	0–3	Peru	24–26	27–29	20–25			71–80

=== 5th place match ===
Date		Score		Set 1	Set 2	Set 3	Set 4	Set 5	Total
26 Set	Colombia	3–0	Uruguay	27–25	25–16	25–14			77–55

=== 3rd place match ===
Date		Score		Set 1	Set 2	Set 3	Set 4	Set 5	Total
26 Set	Chile	1–3	Venezuela	35–37	20–25	25–21	18–25		98–108

=== Final ===
Date		Score		Set 1	Set 2	Set 3	Set 4	Set 5	Total
26 Set	Argentina	0–3	Brazil	26–28	25–27	30–32			81–87

== Final standing ==
Rank	Team
1st place, gold medalist(s)	Brazil
2nd place, silver medalist(s)	Argentina
3rd place, bronze medalist(s)	Venezuela
4	Chile
5	Colombia
6	Uruguay
7	Peru
8	Paraguay

Qualified for the 2011 Junior World Championship

2010 Men's Junior South American champions

Brazil
16th title

== Individual awards ==
- Most valuable player
  - Felipe Martins (BRA)
- Best spiker
  - Kervin Piñerua (VEN)
- Best blocker
  - Octavio Rodríguez (BRA)
- Best server
  - Felipe Martins (BRA)
- Best digger
  - Felipe Papagallo (CHI)
- Best setter
  - Felipe Martins (BRA)
- Best receiver
  - Ary Souza (BRA)
- Best libero
  - Fernando Hehn (ARG)
