= 2014 Men's Junior South American Volleyball Championship =

Tournament details
- Host country: Brazil
- Dates: 27 to 31 August
- Teams: 8
- Venue: 1 (in Saquarema host cities)

Final positions
- Champions: Brazil (18th title)

Tournament awards
- MVP: Douglas Souza (BRA)

The 2014 Men's Junior South American Volleyball Championship was the 22nd edition of the tournament, organised by South America's governing volleyball body, the Confederación Sudamericana de Voleibol (CSV). The tournament will feature eight teams and takes place from 27 to 31 August, in Saquarema, Brazil. The top three teams will qualify for the 2015 Junior World Championship.

== Competing nations ==
Pool A	Pool B
Brazil; Colombia; Peru; Ecuador	Argentina; Chile; Uruguay; Paraguay

== First round ==
=== Pool A ===
Pos	Team	Pld	W	L	Pts	SW	SL	SR	SPW	SPL	SPR	Qualification
1	Brazil	3	3	0	9	9	0	MAX	225	138	1.630	Semifinals
2	Colombia	3	2	1	6	6	3	2.000	196	189	1.037	Semifinals
3	Ecuador	3	1	2	3	3	7	0.429	207	233	0.888	
4	Peru	3	0	3	0	1	9	0.111	183	251	0.729	

Date	Time		Score		Set 1	Set 2	Set 3	Set 4	Set 5	Total	Report
27-Aug	11:30	Colombia	3–0	Peru	25–14	25–22	25–16			75–52	Report
27-Aug	15:30	Brazil	3–0	Ecuador	25–19	25–11	25–14			75–44	Report
28-Aug	09:00	Peru	1–3	Ecuador	16–25	23–25	28–26	16–25		83–101	Report
28-Aug	15:30	Colombia	0–3	Brazil	13–25	17–25	16–25			46–75	Report
29-Aug	09:00	Ecuador	0–3	Colombia	18–25	23–25	21–25			62–75	Report
29-Aug	15:30	Brazil	3–0	Peru	25–13	25–20	25–15			75–48	Report

=== Pool B ===
Pos	Team	Pld	W	L	Pts	SW	SL	SR	SPW	SPL	SPR	Qualification
1	Argentina	3	3	0	9	9	1	9.000	253	141	1.794	Semifinals
2	Chile	3	2	1	6	7	3	2.333	237	189	1.254	Semifinals
3	Uruguay	3	0	3	0	0	9	0.000	127	225	0.564	
4	Paraguay	3	1	2	3	3	6	0.500	140	207	0.676	

Date	Time		Score		Set 1	Set 2	Set 3	Set 4	Set 5	Total	Report
27-Aug	09:00	Chile	3–0	Uruguay	25–14	25–18	25–16			75–48	Report
27-Aug	18:00	Argentina	3–0	Paraguay	25–9	25–7	25–11			75–27	Report
28-Aug	11:30	Chile	3–0	Paraguay	25–14	25–12	25–12			75–38	Report
28-Aug	18:00	Uruguay	0–3	Argentina	12–25	7–25	8–25			27–75	Report
29-Aug	11:30	Paraguay	3–0	Uruguay	25–18	25–20	25–19			75–57	Report
29-Aug	18:00	Argentina	3–1	Chile	27–25	26–28	25–15	25–19		103–87	Report

== Final round ==
=== 5th to 8th places bracket ===
Semifinals
2012-10-30 – Saquarema
Ecuador	3
Uruguay	1
2012-10-30 – Saquarema
Paraguay	2
Peru	3

5th place
2012-10-31 – Saquarema
Ecuador	3
Peru	0
7th place
2012-10-31 – Saquarema
Uruguay	2
Paraguay	3

=== Championship bracket ===
Semifinals
2012-10-30 – Saquarema
Brazil	3
Chile	0
2012-10-30 – Saquarema
Argentina	3
Colombia	0

Final
2012-10-31 – Saquarema
Brazil	3
Argentina	0
Third place
2012-10-31 – Saquarema
Chile	3
Colombia	1

=== Classification 5th at 8th ===
Date	Time		Score		Set 1	Set 2	Set 3	Set 4	Set 5	Total	Report
30-Aug	09:00	Ecuador	3–1	Uruguay	25–15	22–25	25–23	25–22		97–85	Report
30-Aug	11:30	Paraguay	2–3	Peru	16–25	21–25	25–23	25–23	14–16	101–112	Report

=== Semifinals ===
Date	Time		Score		Set 1	Set 2	Set 3	Set 4	Set 5	Total	Report
30-Aug	15:30	Argentina	3–0	Colombia	25–23	25–15	25–21			75–59	Report
30-Aug	18:00	Brazil	3–0	Chile	25–18	25–13	25–10			75–41	Report

=== 7th place ===
Date	Time		Score		Set 1	Set 2	Set 3	Set 4	Set 5	Total	Report
31-Aug	09:00	Uruguay	2–3	Paraguay	21–25	25–20	21–25	25–21	9–15	101–106	Report

=== 5th place ===
Date	Time		Score		Set 1	Set 2	Set 3	Set 4	Set 5	Total	Report
31-Aug	11:30	Ecuador	3–0	Peru	25–20	25–22	25–23			75–65	Report

=== 3rd place ===
Date	Time		Score		Set 1	Set 2	Set 3	Set 4	Set 5	Total	Report
31-Aug	15:30	Chile	3–1	Colombia	18–25	25–19	25–23	28–26		96–93	Report

=== Final ===
Date	Time		Score		Set 1	Set 2	Set 3	Set 4	Set 5	Total	Report
31-Aug	18:00	Brazil	3–0	Argentina	25–21	25–16	25–22			75–59	Report

== Final standing ==
Rank	Team	Qualification
1st place, gold medalist(s)	Brazil	Qualification to the 2015 FIVB Volleyball Men's U21 World Championship
2nd place, silver medalist(s)	Argentina	Qualification to the 2015 FIVB Volleyball Men's U21 World Championship
3rd place, bronze medalist(s)	Chile	
4	Colombia	
5	Ecuador	
6	Peru	
7	Paraguay	
8	Uruguay	

2014 Men's Junior South American champions

Brazil
18th title

== All-Star Team ==
- Most valuable player
  - Douglas Souza (BRA)
- Best setter
  - Fernando Kreling (BRA)
- Best Opposite
  - Lucas Madaloz (BRA)
- Best Outside Hitters
  - Dusan Bonacic (CHI)
  - Nicolás Lazo (ARG)
- Best Middle Blockers
  - Nicolas Santos (BRA)
  - Joaquin Gallego (ARG)
- Best libero
  - Rogério Carvalho (BRA)
