= 2021 FIVB Volleyball Men's U21 World Championship =

2021 Men's U21 World Championship
Campionato mondiale maschile under 21 di pallavolo 2021 Световно първенство по волейбол за мъже до 21 години на FIVB 2021

Tournament details
- Host countries: Italy; Bulgaria
- Dates: 23 September – 3 October
- Teams: 16 (from 5 confederations)
- Venue: 3 (in 3 host cities)

Final positions
- Champions: Italy (1st title)
- Runners-up: Russia
- Third place: Poland
- Fourth place: Argentina

Tournament awards
- MVP: (Italy) Alessandro Michieletto
- Best Setter: (Italy) Paolo Porro
- Best OH: (Argentina) Manuel Armoa (Italy) Tommaso Rinaldi
- Best MB: (Poland) Karol Urbanowicz (Italy) Nicola Ciancotta
- Best OPP: (Russia) Roman Murashko
- Best Libero: (Italy) Damiano Catania

The 2021 FIVB Volleyball Men's U21 World Championship was the 21st edition of the FIVB Volleyball Men's U21 World Championship, contested by the men's national teams under the age of 21 of the members of the FIVB, the sport's global governing body. The tournament was held in Italy and Bulgaria from 23 September to 3 October 2021. For the first time, the tournament was jointly hosted by more than one country.

Iran were the defending champions, having won their first title in Bahrain.

Players must have been born on or after 1 January 2001.

== Qualification ==
A total of 16 teams qualified for the final tournament. In addition to Italy and Bulgaria who qualified automatically as hosts, another 10 teams qualified via five separate continental tournaments while the remaining 4 teams qualified via the FIVB U21 World Ranking. But, South Korea and China later withdrew and were replaced by Thailand and Poland respectively. In addition, Cameroon withdrew just before the beginning of the tournament. All of Cameroon's matches were forfeited and Cameroon were ranked in last place in the final standing.

Means of qualification	Date	Venue	Vacancies	Qualifier
Host Countries	13 October 2020	(Switzerland) Lausanne	2	Italy
Host Countries	13 October 2020	(Switzerland) Lausanne	2	Bulgaria
2018 Asian Championship^{1}	21–28 July 2018	(Bahrain) Riffa	2	Iran
2018 Asian Championship^{1}	21–28 July 2018	(Bahrain) Riffa	2	~~South Korea~~; Thailand
NORCECA Ranking^{2}	January 2020	(Dominican Republic) Santo Domingo	2	Cuba
NORCECA Ranking^{2}	January 2020	(Dominican Republic) Santo Domingo	2	Canada
2020 European Championship	26 September – 4 October 2020	(Czech Republic) Brno & Kuřim	2	Russia
2020 European Championship	26 September – 4 October 2020	(Czech Republic) Brno & Kuřim	2	Belgium^{4}
2020 African Championship	20–24 February 2021	(Egypt) Cairo	2	Egypt
2020 African Championship	20–24 February 2021	(Egypt) Cairo	2	Cameroon
World Ranking for CSV^{3}	1 March 2021	(Brazil) Rio de Janeiro	2	Brazil
World Ranking for CSV^{3}	1 March 2021	(Brazil) Rio de Janeiro	2	Argentina
World Ranking	1 March 2021	(Switzerland) Lausanne	4	~~China~~; Poland
World Ranking	1 March 2021	(Switzerland) Lausanne	4	Morocco
World Ranking	1 March 2021	(Switzerland) Lausanne	4	Bahrain
World Ranking	1 March 2021	(Switzerland) Lausanne	4	Czech Republic
Total			16	

1.On 14 December 2020, AVC announced that the 2020 Asian Championship which was originally the AVC qualifier for the tournament was canceled due to COVID-19 pandemic and the top two teams of the 2018 Asian Championship qualified as the AVC representatives.
2.On 30 November 2020, NORCECA announced that the 2020 NORCECA Championship which was originally the NORCECA qualifier for the tournament was canceled due to COVID-19 pandemic and the top two teams of the NORCECA Ranking as of January 2020 qualified as the NORCECA representatives.
3.2020 South American Championship which was originally the CSV qualifier for the tournament was canceled due to COVID-19 pandemic and the top two CSV teams of the World Ranking as of 1 March 2021 qualified as the CSV representatives.
4.With European runners-up Italy hosting the tournament together with Bulgaria, European 3rd place Belgium joined the field for the tournament as well.

== Pools composition ==
=== First round ===
Teams were seeded in the first two positions of each pool following the serpentine system according to their FIVB U21 World Ranking as of 1 March 2021. FIVB reserved the right to seed the hosts as head of pools A and B regardless of the U21 World Ranking. All teams not seeded were drawn to take other available positions in the remaining lines, following the U21 World Ranking. The draw was held on 15 June 2021. Rankings are shown in brackets except the hosts Italy and Bulgaria who ranked 1st and 27th respectively.

Seeded teams		Pot 1	Pot 2
Italy (Hosts); Bulgaria (Hosts); Iran (2); Russia (2)	Brazil (4); Argentina (5); Cuba (6); Egypt (8)	Morocco (10); Bahrain (11); Czech Republic (12); Cameroon (13)	Poland (14); Belgium (15); Canada (18); Thailand (47)

Draw

Pool A	Pool B	Pool C	Pool D
Italy	Bulgaria	Iran	Russia
Egypt	Cuba	Argentina	Brazil
Czech Republic	Bahrain	Morocco	Cameroon
Thailand	Poland	Belgium	Canada

=== Second round ===
Final eight				9th–16th places			
Pool E		Pool F		Pool G		Pool H	
1A	Italy	1B	Poland	3A	Thailand	3B	Cuba
1C	Belgium	1D	Russia	3C	Iran	3D	Canada
2A	Czech Republic	2B	Bulgaria	4A	Egypt	4B	Bahrain
2C	Argentina	2D	Brazil	4C	Morocco	4D	Cameroon

== Venues ==
Pool A, E and Final four	Pool B, D, F, H, 13th–16th places and 9th–12th places	Pool C, G and 5th–8th places
Cagliari, Italy	Sofia, Bulgaria	Carbonia, Italy
PalaPirastu	Levski Sofia Sports Hall	Palazzetto dello Sport
Capacity: 2,266	Capacity: 1,700	Capacity: 1,560
2021 FIVB Volleyball Men's U21 World Championship (Sardinia)	Sofia (Bulgaria)	

== Pool standing procedure ==
1. Number of matches won
2. Match points
3. Sets ratio
4. Points ratio
5. If the tie continues as per the point ratio between two teams, the priority will be given to the team which won the last match between them. When the tie in points ratio is between three or more teams, a new classification of these teams in the terms of points 1, 2 and 3 will be made taking into consideration only the matches in which they were opposed to each other.

Match won 3–0 or 3–1: 3 match points for the winner, 0 match points for the loser
Match won 3–2: 2 match points for the winner, 1 match point for the loser

== First round ==
=== Pool A ===
- All times are Central European Summer Time (UTC+02:00).

Pos	Team	Pld	W	L	Pts	SW	SL	SR	SPW	SPL	SPR	Qualification
1	Italy	3	3	0	9	9	0	MAX	225	140	1.607	Final eight (Pools E and F)
2	Czech Republic	3	2	1	6	6	4	1.500	230	212	1.085	Final eight (Pools E and F)
3	Thailand	3	1	2	3	3	7	0.429	182	245	0.743	9th–16th places (Pools G and H)
4	Egypt	3	0	3	0	2	9	0.222	234	274	0.854	9th–16th places (Pools G and H)

Date	Time		Score		Set 1	Set 2	Set 3	Set 4	Set 5	Total	Report
23 Sep	16:00	Czech Republic	3–1	Egypt	25–20	25–16	29–31	25–23		104–90	P2
23 Sep	19:00	Thailand	0–3	Italy	12–25	15–25	13–25			40–75	P2
24 Sep	16:00	Czech Republic	3–0	Thailand	25–16	25–16	25–15			75–47	P2
24 Sep	19:00	Egypt	0–3	Italy	13–25	22–25	14–25			49–75	P2
25 Sep	16:00	Egypt	1–3	Thailand	25–18	23–25	22–25	25–27		95–95	P2
25 Sep	19:10	Italy	3–0	Czech Republic	25–16	25–15	25–20			75–51	P2

=== Pool B ===
- All times are Eastern European Summer Time (UTC+03:00).

Pos	Team	Pld	W	L	Pts	SW	SL	SR	SPW	SPL	SPR	Qualification
1	Poland	3	3	0	9	9	2	4.500	270	231	1.169	Final eight (Pools E and F)
2	Bulgaria	3	2	1	6	7	3	2.333	240	231	1.039	Final eight (Pools E and F)
3	Cuba	3	1	2	3	4	7	0.571	237	252	0.940	9th–16th places (Pools G and H)
4	Bahrain	3	0	3	0	1	9	0.111	211	244	0.865	9th–16th places (Pools G and H)

Date	Time		Score		Set 1	Set 2	Set 3	Set 4	Set 5	Total	Report
23 Sep	13:00	Cuba	1–3	Poland	16–25	19–25	25–18	19–25		79–93	P2
23 Sep	19:00	Bulgaria	3–0	Bahrain	25–21	25–21	25–23			75–65	P2
24 Sep	16:00	Poland	3–0	Bahrain	25–21	25–20	25–21			75–62	P2
24 Sep	19:00	Cuba	0–3	Bulgaria	21–25	22–25	21–25			64–75	P2
25 Sep	13:00	Bahrain	1–3	Cuba	25–19	20–25	18–25	21–25		84–94	P2
25 Sep	19:00	Poland	3–1	Bulgaria	29–27	25–19	23–25	25–19		102–90	P2

=== Pool C ===
- All times are Central European Summer Time (UTC+02:00).

Pos	Team	Pld	W	L	Pts	SW	SL	SR	SPW	SPL	SPR	Qualification
1	Belgium	3	3	0	8	9	3	3.000	290	232	1.250	Final eight (Pools E and F)
2	Argentina	3	2	1	5	7	5	1.400	269	256	1.051	Final eight (Pools E and F)
3	Iran	3	1	2	5	7	6	1.167	288	271	1.063	9th–16th places (Pools G and H)
4	Morocco	3	0	3	0	0	9	0.000	137	225	0.609	9th–16th places (Pools G and H)

Date	Time		Score		Set 1	Set 2	Set 3	Set 4	Set 5	Total	Report
23 Sep	16:00	Argentina	3–0	Morocco	25–13	25–16	25–23			75–52	P2
23 Sep	19:00	Belgium	3–2	Iran	25–20	25–23	26–28	26–28	15–8	117–107	P2
24 Sep	16:00	Morocco	0–3	Belgium	16–25	12–25	16–25			44–75	P2
24 Sep	19:00	Argentina	3–2	Iran	25–20	20–25	24–26	25–18	19–17	113–106	P2
25 Sep	16:00	Argentina	1–3	Belgium	19–25	17–25	25–23	20–25		81–98	P2
25 Sep	19:15	Iran	3–0	Morocco	25–5	25–21	25–15			75–41	P2

=== Pool D ===
- All times are Eastern European Summer Time (UTC+03:00).
- Cameroon's forfeited matches (25–0, 25–0, 25–0) were not recorded and excluded from the ranking calculation.

Pos	Team	Pld	W	L	Pts	SW	SL	SR	SPW	SPL	SPR	Qualification
1	Russia	2	2	0	5	6	3	2.000	200	184	1.087	Final eight (Pools E and F)
2	Brazil	2	1	1	4	5	3	1.667	177	165	1.073	Final eight (Pools E and F)
3	Canada	2	0	2	0	1	6	0.167	143	171	0.836	9th–16th places (Pools G and H)
4	Cameroon	0	0	0	0	0	0	—	0	0	—	9th–16th places (Pools G and H)

Date	Time		Score		Set 1	Set 2	Set 3	Set 4	Set 5	Total	Report
23 Sep	16:00	Russia	3–2	Brazil	16–25	25–22	23–25	25–21	15–9	104–102	P2
24 Sep	13:00	Canada	0–3	Brazil	22–25	21–25	18–25			61–75	P2
25 Sep	16:00	Canada	1–3	Russia	13–25	22–25	25–21	22–25		82–96	P2

== Second round ==
=== Pool E ===
- All times are Central European Summer Time (UTC+02:00).

Pos	Team	Pld	W	L	Pts	SW	SL	SR	SPW	SPL	SPR	Qualification
1	Italy	3	3	0	9	9	0	MAX	228	183	1.246	Semifinals
2	Argentina	3	2	1	5	6	6	1.000	273	264	1.034	Semifinals
3	Czech Republic	3	1	2	3	5	8	0.625	255	287	0.889	5th–8th semifinals
4	Belgium	3	0	3	1	3	9	0.333	254	276	0.920	5th–8th semifinals

Date	Time		Score		Set 1	Set 2	Set 3	Set 4	Set 5	Total	Report
27 Sep	16:00	Czech Republic	3–2	Belgium	14–25	22–25	25–23	25–18	15–12	101–103	P2
27 Sep	19:00	Italy	3–0	Argentina	25–22	26–24	25–20			76–66	P2
28 Sep	16:00	Belgium	1–3	Argentina	21–25	25–23	19–25	21–25		86–98	P2
28 Sep	19:10	Italy	3–0	Czech Republic	25–19	25–18	25–15			75–52	P2
29 Sep	16:00	Czech Republic	2–3	Argentina	25–22	22–25	17–25	25–22	13–15	102–109	P2
29 Sep	19:20	Italy	3–0	Belgium	25–17	25–23	27–25			77–65	P2

=== Pool F ===
- All times are Eastern European Summer Time (UTC+03:00).

Pos	Team	Pld	W	L	Pts	SW	SL	SR	SPW	SPL	SPR	Qualification
1	Russia	3	3	0	9	9	1	9.000	250	223	1.121	Semifinals
2	Poland	3	2	1	5	7	6	1.167	292	295	0.990	Semifinals
3	Brazil	3	1	2	3	4	6	0.667	247	231	1.069	5th–8th semifinals
4	Bulgaria	3	0	3	1	2	9	0.222	219	259	0.846	5th–8th semifinals

Date	Time		Score		Set 1	Set 2	Set 3	Set 4	Set 5	Total	Report
27 Sep	13:00	Poland	3–1	Brazil	28–26	25–23	19–25	25–23		97–97	P2
27 Sep	19:00	Bulgaria	0–3	Russia	21–25	22–25	19–25			62–75	P2
28 Sep	13:00	Russia	3–0	Brazil	27–25	25–21	31–29			83–75	P2
28 Sep	19:00	Poland	3–2	Bulgaria	21–25	23–25	25–22	25–22	15–12	109–106	P2
29 Sep	13:00	Poland	1–3	Russia	23–25	25–17	18–25	20–25		86–92	P2
29 Sep	19:00	Bulgaria	0–3	Brazil	14–25	22–25	15–25			51–75	P2

=== Pool G ===
- All times are Central European Summer Time (UTC+02:00).

Pos	Team	Pld	W	L	Pts	SW	SL	SR	SPW	SPL	SPR	Qualification
1	Iran	3	3	0	9	9	0	MAX	225	153	1.471	9th–12th semifinals
2	Thailand	3	2	1	6	6	4	1.500	220	218	1.009	9th–12th semifinals
3	Egypt	3	1	2	3	4	7	0.571	256	243	1.053	13th–16th semifinals
4	Morocco	3	0	3	0	1	9	0.111	160	247	0.648	13th–16th semifinals

Date	Time		Score		Set 1	Set 2	Set 3	Set 4	Set 5	Total	Report
27 Sep	16:00	Thailand	3–0	Morocco	25–12	25–15	25–22			75–49	P2
27 Sep	19:00	Egypt	0–3	Iran	22–25	23–25	20–25			65–75	P2
28 Sep	16:00	Iran	3–0	Morocco	25–9	25–14	25–13			75–36	P2
28 Sep	19:00	Thailand	3–1	Egypt	25–23	25–23	18–25	25–23		93–94	P2
29 Sep	16:00	Egypt	3–1	Morocco	22–25	25–12	25–19	25–19		97–75	P2
29 Sep	19:00	Thailand	0–3	Iran	18–25	12–25	22–25			52–75	P2

=== Pool H ===
- All times are Eastern European Summer Time (UTC+03:00).
- Cameroon's forfeited matches (25–0, 25–0, 25–0) were not recorded and excluded from the ranking calculation.

Pos	Team	Pld	W	L	Pts	SW	SL	SR	SPW	SPL	SPR	Qualification
1	Canada	2	2	0	6	6	0	MAX	150	119	1.261	9th–12th semifinals
2	Cuba	2	1	1	3	3	4	0.750	162	172	0.942	9th–12th semifinals
3	Bahrain	2	0	2	0	1	6	0.167	157	178	0.882	13th–16th semifinals
4	Cameroon	0	0	0	0	0	0	—	0	0	—	13th–16th semifinals

Date	Time		Score		Set 1	Set 2	Set 3	Set 4	Set 5	Total	Report
27 Sep	16:00	Bahrain	0–3	Canada	22–25	21–25	17–25			60–75	P2
28 Sep	16:00	Cuba	3–1	Bahrain	26–28	25–21	27–25	25–23		103–97	P2
29 Sep	16:00	Cuba	0–3	Canada	21–25	21–25	17–25			59–75	P2

== Final round ==
=== 13th–16th places ===
- All times are Eastern European Summer Time (UTC+03:00).
- Cameroon's forfeited matches (25–0, 25–0, 25–0) were not recorded.

13th–16th semifinals
2 October
Egypt	3
Cameroon	0
2 October
Bahrain	3
Morocco	0

13th place match
3 October
Egypt	3
Bahrain	2
15th place match
3 October
Cameroon	0
Morocco	3

==== 13th–16th semifinals ====
Date	Time		Score		Set 1	Set 2	Set 3	Set 4	Set 5	Total	Report
2 Oct	13:00	Bahrain	3–0	Morocco	25–21	25–13	25–22			75–56	P2

==== 13th place match ====
Date	Time		Score		Set 1	Set 2	Set 3	Set 4	Set 5	Total	Report
3 Oct	10:00	Egypt	3–2	Bahrain	26–28	26–24	22–25	25–16	15–9	114–102	P2

=== 9th–12th places ===
- All times are Eastern European Summer Time (UTC+03:00).

9th–12th semifinals
2 October
Canada	3
Thailand	0
2 October
Iran	3
Cuba	1

9th place match
3 October
Canada	1
Iran	3
11th place match
3 October
Thailand	1
Cuba	3

==== 9th–12th semifinals ====
Date	Time		Score		Set 1	Set 2	Set 3	Set 4	Set 5	Total	Report
2 Oct	16:00	Canada	3–0	Thailand	25–20	25–16	25–17			75–53	P2
2 Oct	19:00	Iran	3–1	Cuba	25–15	25–19	17–25	25–23		92–82	P2

==== 11th place match ====
Date	Time		Score		Set 1	Set 2	Set 3	Set 4	Set 5	Total	Report
3 Oct	13:10	Thailand	1–3	Cuba	37–35	18–25	16–25	23–25		94–110	P2

==== 9th place match ====
Date	Time		Score		Set 1	Set 2	Set 3	Set 4	Set 5	Total	Report
3 Oct	16:00	Canada	1–3	Iran	17–25	21–25	27–25	15–25		80–100	P2

=== 5th–8th places ===
- All times are Central European Summer Time (UTC+02:00).

5th–8th semifinals
2 October
Czech Republic	1
Bulgaria	3
2 October
Brazil	1
Belgium	3

5th place match
3 October
Bulgaria	1
Belgium	3
7th place match
3 October
Czech Republic	0
Brazil	3

==== 5th–8th semifinals ====
Date	Time		Score		Set 1	Set 2	Set 3	Set 4	Set 5	Total	Report
2 Oct	16:00	Czech Republic	1–3	Bulgaria	26–24	22–25	22–25	23–25		93–99	P2
2 Oct	19:00	Brazil	1–3	Belgium	25–19	24–26	21–25	23–25		93–95	P2

==== 7th place match ====
Date	Time		Score		Set 1	Set 2	Set 3	Set 4	Set 5	Total	Report
3 Oct	16:00	Czech Republic	0–3	Brazil	13–25	21–25	15–25			49–75	P2

==== 5th place match ====
Date	Time		Score		Set 1	Set 2	Set 3	Set 4	Set 5	Total	Report
3 Oct	19:00	Bulgaria	1–3	Belgium	25–19	22–25	20–25	23–25		90–94	P2

=== Final four ===
- All times are Central European Summer Time (UTC+02:00).

Semifinals
2 October
Russia	3
Argentina	0
2 October
Italy	3
Poland	2

Final
3 October
Russia	0
Italy	3
3rd place match
3 October
Argentina	0
Poland	3

==== Semifinals ====
Date	Time		Score		Set 1	Set 2	Set 3	Set 4	Set 5	Total	Report
2 Oct	16:00	Russia	3–0	Argentina	27–25	28–26	25–17			80–68	P2
2 Oct	19:00	Italy	3–2	Poland	20–25	20–25	25–11	25–20	15–12	105–93	P2

==== 3rd place match ====
Date	Time		Score		Set 1	Set 2	Set 3	Set 4	Set 5	Total	Report
3 Oct	16:00	Argentina	0–3	Poland	16–25	14–25	19–25			49–75	P2

==== Final ====
Date	Time		Score		Set 1	Set 2	Set 3	Set 4	Set 5	Total	Report
3 Oct	19:00	Russia	0–3	Italy	19–25	22–25	20–25			61–75	P2

== Final standing ==
Rank	Team
1st place, gold medalist(s)	Italy
2nd place, silver medalist(s)	Russia
3rd place, bronze medalist(s)	Poland
4	Argentina
5	Belgium
6	Bulgaria
7	Brazil
8	Czech Republic
9	Iran
10	Canada
11	Cuba
12	Thailand
13	Egypt
14	Bahrain
15	Morocco
16	Cameroon

2021 Men's U21 World champions

Italy
1st title

12–man roster
Damiano Catania, Leonardo Ferrato, Francesco Comparoni, Federico Crosato, Alessandro Michieletto, Mattia Gottardo, Tommaso Stefani, Andrea Schiro, Giulio Magalini, Tommaso Rinaldi, Paolo Porro, Nicola Cianciotta
Head coach
Angiolino Frigoni

== Awards ==
- Most valuable player
  (Italy) Alessandro Michieletto
- Best setter
  (Italy) Paolo Porro
- Best outside spikers
  (Argentina) Manuel Armoa
  (Italy) Tommaso Rinaldi
- Best middle blockers
  (Poland) Karol Urbanowicz
  (Italy) Nicola Ciancotta
- Best opposite spiker
  (Russia) Roman Murashko
- Best libero
  (Italy) Damiano Catania

== See also ==
- 2021 FIVB Volleyball Women's U20 World Championship
