= Men's Junior South American Volleyball Championship =

Sport competition

- Most recent season or competition: 2024 Men's U21 South American Volleyball Championship
- Sport: Volleyball
- Founded: 1972
- Continent: South America (CSV)
- Most recent champion: Brazil (21st title)
- Most titles: Brazil (21 titles)

The Men's Junior South American Volleyball Championship is a sport competition for national volleyball teams with players under 21 years, currently held biannually and organized by the Confederación Sudamericana de Voleibol (CSV), the South American volleyball federation.

== Results summary ==
Year	Host	Final			3rd place match			Teams
Year	Host	Champions	Score	Runners-up	3rd place	Score	4th place	Teams
1972; Details	(Brazil); Rio de Janeiro	Brazil	Round-robin	Argentina	Chile	Round-robin	Uruguay	6
1974; Details	(Argentina); Mendoza	Brazil	Round-robin	Argentina	Paraguay	Round-robin	Uruguay	6
1976; Details	(Bolivia); La Paz	Brazil	Round-robin	Argentina	Venezuela	Round-robin	Colombia	8
1978; Details	(Brazil); Rio de Janeiro	Brazil	Round-robin	Argentina	Peru	Round-robin	Uruguay	6
1980; Details	(Chile); Santiago	Argentina	Round-robin	Brazil	Chile	Round-robin	Venezuela	5
1982; Details	(Argentina); Santa Fe	Argentina	Round-robin	Brazil	Chile	Round-robin	Colombia	6
1984; Details	(Colombia); Bucaramanga	Brazil	Round-robin	Argentina	Chile	Round-robin	Venezuela	7
1986; Details	(Brazil); São Paulo	Brazil	Round-robin	Argentina	Venezuela	Round-robin	Paraguay	8
1988; Details	(Venezuela); Caracas	Brazil	Round-robin	Argentina	Venezuela	Round-robin	Colombia	5
1990; Details	(Argentina); Catamarca	Brazil	Round-robin	Argentina	Venezuela	Round-robin	Peru	10
1992; Details	(Ecuador); Guayaquil	Brazil	Round-robin	Argentina	Venezuela	Round-robin	Colombia	7
1994; Details	(Peru); Lima	Brazil	Round-robin	Venezuela	Argentina	Round-robin	Peru	7
1996; Details	(Colombia); Cali	Brazil	3–0	Venezuela	Argentina	3–0	Colombia	6
1998; Details	(Chile); Santiago	Brazil	Round-robin	Venezuela	Colombia	Round-robin	Argentina	7
2000; Details	(Venezuela); Maracaibo	Venezuela	3–2	Brazil	Argentina	3–0	Colombia	8
2002; Details	(Brazil); Poços de Caldas	Brazil	Round-robin	Venezuela	Argentina	Round-robin	Chile	6
2004; Details	(Chile); Santiago	Brazil	3–1	Argentina	Venezuela	3–0	Chile	10
2006; Details	(Brazil); Manaus	Brazil	3–2	Argentina	Venezuela	3–2	Chile	8
2008; Details	(Brazil); Poços de Caldas	Argentina	3–1	Brazil	Venezuela	3–0	Chile	10
2010; Details	(Chile); Santiago	Brazil	3–0	Argentina	Venezuela	3–1	Chile	8
2012; Details	(Brazil); Saquarema	Brazil	3–0	Argentina	Venezuela	3–0	Chile	7
2014; Details	(Brazil); Saquarema	Brazil	3–0	Argentina	Chile	3–1	Colombia	8
2016; Details	(Argentina); Bariloche	Argentina	3–0	Brazil	Colombia	3–1	Chile	6
2018; Details	(Argentina); Bariloche	Brazil	3–1	Argentina	Chile	3–2	Colombia	6
2022; Details	(Peru); Tacna	Brazil	Round-robin	Argentina	Chile	Round-robin	Peru	5
2024; Details	(Peru); Lima	Brazil	3–1	Colombia	Argentina	3–1	Peru	7

== Medals summary ==
Rank	Nation	Gold	Silver	Bronze	Total
1	Brazil	21	5	0	26
2	Argentina	4	16	5	25
3	Venezuela	1	4	10	15
4	Colombia	0	1	2	3
5	Chile	0	0	7	7
6	Paraguay	0	0	1	1
6	Peru	0	0	1	1
Totals (7 entries)		26	26	26	78

== See also ==
- Women's Junior South American Volleyball Championship
- Men's U23 South American Volleyball Championship
- Boys' Youth South American Volleyball Championship
- Boys' U17 South American Volleyball Championship
