= 2019 FIVB Volleyball Men's U21 World Championship =

2019 Men's U21 World Championship
بطولة العالم للكرة الطائرة رجال تحت 21 عاما 2019 البحرين

Tournament details
- Host country: Bahrain
- City: Riffa
- Dates: 18–27 July
- Teams: 16 (from 5 confederations)
- Venue: 2 (in 1 host city)

Final positions
- Champions: Iran (1st title)
- Runners-up: Italy
- Third place: Brazil
- Fourth place: Russia

Tournament awards
- MVP: (Iran) Amirhossein Esfandiar
- Best Setter: (Italy) Lorenzo Sperotto
- Best OH: (Italy) Daniele Lavia (Iran) Morteza Sharifi
- Best MB: (Italy) Lorenzo Cortesia (Brazil) Guilherme Voss Santos
- Best OPP: (Russia) Maksim Sapozhkov
- Best Libero: (Iran) Mohammad Reza Hazratpour

The 2019 FIVB Volleyball Men's U21 World Championship was the twentieth edition of the FIVB Volleyball Men's U21 World Championship, contested by the men's national teams under the age of 21 of the members of the FIVB, the sport's global governing body. The tournament was held in Riffa, Bahrain from 18 to 27 July 2019. 16 teams from the 5 confederations competed in the tournament.

Players must be born on or after 1 January 1999.

Iran won its first title in the competition, defeating Italy in the final. Brazil defeated Russia for the bronze medal. Amirhossein Esfandiar from Iran was elected the MVP.

== Qualification ==
A total of 16 teams qualified for the final tournament. In addition to Bahrain, who qualified automatically as hosts, another 10 teams qualified via six separate continental tournaments while the remaining 5 teams qualified via the FIVB U21 World Ranking.

Means of qualification	Date	Venue	Vacancies	Qualifier
Host country	28 August 2018	(Switzerland) Lausanne	1	Bahrain
2018 European Championship	14–22 July 2018	(Belgium) Kortrijk, (Netherlands) The Hague & Ede	2	Russia
2018 European Championship	14–22 July 2018	(Belgium) Kortrijk, (Netherlands) The Hague & Ede	2	Czech Republic
2018 Asian Championship	21–28 July 2018	(Bahrain) Riffa	2	Iran
2018 Asian Championship	21–28 July 2018	(Bahrain) Riffa	2	South Korea
2018 NORCECA Championship	27 August – 1 September 2018	(Cuba) Havana	1	Cuba
2018 African Championship	12–19 September 2018	(Nigeria) Abuja	2	Tunisia
2018 African Championship	12–19 September 2018	(Nigeria) Abuja	2	Egypt
2018 South American Championship	23–27 October 2018	(Argentina) Bariloche	2	Brazil
2018 South American Championship	23–27 October 2018	(Argentina) Bariloche	2	Argentina
2019 Pan-American Cup	5–11 May 2019	(Peru) Lima	1	Puerto Rico
World Ranking	January 2019	(Switzerland) Lausanne	5	Poland
World Ranking	January 2019	(Switzerland) Lausanne	5	China
World Ranking	January 2019	(Switzerland) Lausanne	5	Canada
World Ranking	January 2019	(Switzerland) Lausanne	5	Morocco
World Ranking	January 2019	(Switzerland) Lausanne	5	Italy
Total			16	

== Pools composition ==
=== First round ===
Teams were seeded in the first two positions of each pool following the serpentine system according to their FIVB U21 World Ranking as of January 2019. FIVB reserved the right to seed the hosts as head of pool A regardless of the U21 World Ranking. All teams not seeded were drawn to take other available positions in the remaining lines, following the U21 World Ranking. The draw was held in Manama, Bahrain on 3 June 2019. Rankings are shown in brackets except the hosts who ranked 42nd.

Seeded teams		Pot 1	Pot 2
Bahrain (Hosts); Cuba (1); Russia (2); Poland (3)	Brazil (4); Iran (5); Argentina (6); China (7)	Canada (8); Egypt (9); Czech Republic (10); Morocco (11)	Italy (12); Tunisia (12); South Korea (15); Puerto Rico (77)

Draw

Pool A	Pool B	Pool C	Pool D
Bahrain	Cuba	Russia	Poland
China	Argentina	Iran	Brazil
Morocco	Egypt	Czech Republic	Canada
Puerto Rico	South Korea	Tunisia	Italy

=== Second round ===
Final eight				9th–16th places			
Pool E		Pool F		Pool G		Pool H	
1A	China	1B	Argentina	3A	Puerto Rico	3B	Cuba
1C	Russia	1D	Italy	3C	Czech Republic	3D	Poland
2B	South Korea	2A	Bahrain	4B	Egypt	4A	Morocco
2D	Brazil	2C	Iran	4D	Canada	4C	Tunisia

== Venues ==
- Isa Sports City Hall C, Riffa, Bahrain – Pool A, C, E, F, 5th–8th places and Final four
- Isa Sports City Hall B, Riffa, Bahrain – Pool B, D, G, H, 13th–16th places and 9th–12th places

== Referees ==
There were sixteen referees from 5 continental confederations in this tournament.

AVC (5)

- (Australia) Toan Phong Nguyen
- (Bahrain) Sami Hassan Ebrahim Sowayed
- (Japan) Tatsuhiro Sawa
- (South Korea) Bae Sun-ok
- (Thailand) Jirasak Pumduang

CAVB (2)

- (Algeria) Redha Bouzidi
- (Botswana) Edgar Serole

CEV (2)

- (Bulgaria) Aleksandar Vinaliev
- (United Kingdom) Nicholas Heckford
- (Slovakia) Igor Porvaznik

CSV (2)

- (Argentina) José Luis Barrios
- (Brazil) Paulo Luis Beal
- (Colombia) Jorge Ernesto Erazo Maldonado

NORCECA (3)

- (The Bahamas) Lanza Miller
- (Mexico) Daniel Gonzalez
- (Puerto Rico) Miguel A. Figueroa Medina

== Pool standing procedure ==
1. Number of matches won
2. Match points
3. Sets ratio
4. Points ratio
5. If the tie continues as per the point ratio between two teams, the priority will be given to the team which won the last match between them. When the tie in points ratio is between three or more teams, a new classification of these teams in the terms of points 1, 2 and 3 will be made taking into consideration only the matches in which they were opposed to each other.

Match won 3–0 or 3–1: 3 match points for the winner, 0 match points for the loser
Match won 3–2: 2 match points for the winner, 1 match point for the loser

== First round ==
- All times are Arabia Standard Time (UTC+03:00).

=== Pool A ===
Pos	Team	Pld	W	L	Pts	SW	SL	SR	SPW	SPL	SPR	Qualification
1	China	3	3	0	9	9	1	9.000	248	197	1.259	Final eight (Pools E and F)
2	Bahrain	3	2	1	5	7	5	1.400	262	247	1.061	Final eight (Pools E and F)
3	Puerto Rico	3	1	2	3	3	7	0.429	229	249	0.920	9th–16th places (Pools G and H)
4	Morocco	3	0	3	1	3	9	0.333	248	294	0.844	9th–16th places (Pools G and H)

Date	Time		Score		Set 1	Set 2	Set 3	Set 4	Set 5	Total	Report
18 Jul	16:30	Morocco	0–3	China	16–25	23–25	13–25			52–75	P2
18 Jul	19:00	Bahrain	3–0	Puerto Rico	25–18	25–14	25–20			75–52	P2
19 Jul	17:00	China	3–0	Puerto Rico	25–23	25–22	25–23			75–68	P2
19 Jul	19:17	Morocco	2–3	Bahrain	14–25	25–23	21–25	25–22	12–15	97–110	P2
20 Jul	16:30	Puerto Rico	3–1	Morocco	25–22	25–21	34–36	25–20		109–99	P2
20 Jul	19:30	China	3–1	Bahrain	25–19	23–25	25–18	25–15		98–77	P2

=== Pool B ===
Pos	Team	Pld	W	L	Pts	SW	SL	SR	SPW	SPL	SPR	Qualification
1	Argentina	3	2	1	7	8	5	1.600	306	288	1.063	Final eight (Pools E and F)
2	South Korea	3	2	1	6	7	4	1.750	267	257	1.039	Final eight (Pools E and F)
3	Cuba	3	2	1	4	7	7	1.000	310	308	1.006	9th–16th places (Pools G and H)
4	Egypt	3	0	3	1	3	9	0.333	250	280	0.893	9th–16th places (Pools G and H)

Date	Time		Score		Set 1	Set 2	Set 3	Set 4	Set 5	Total	Report
18 Jul	11:38	Cuba	1–3	South Korea	25–27	25–17	22–25	25–27		97–96	P2
18 Jul	14:20	Argentina	3–1	Egypt	25–19	26–24	22–25	25–18		98–86	P2
19 Jul	11:30	South Korea	3–0	Egypt	25–22	25–18	25–21			75–61	P2
19 Jul	14:00	Cuba	3–2	Argentina	25–23	25–23	19–25	22–25	15–13	106–109	P2
20 Jul	11:30	South Korea	1–3	Argentina	25–20	27–29	22–25	22–25		96–99	P2
20 Jul	14:15	Cuba	3–2	Egypt	26–24	25–20	21–25	20–25	15–9	107–103	P2

=== Pool C ===
Pos	Team	Pld	W	L	Pts	SW	SL	SR	SPW	SPL	SPR	Qualification
1	Russia	3	3	0	8	9	3	3.000	278	240	1.158	Final eight (Pools E and F)
2	Iran	3	2	1	7	8	3	2.667	259	230	1.126	Final eight (Pools E and F)
3	Czech Republic	3	1	2	3	4	6	0.667	225	236	0.953	9th–16th places (Pools G and H)
4	Tunisia	3	0	3	0	0	9	0.000	169	225	0.751	9th–16th places (Pools G and H)

Date	Time		Score		Set 1	Set 2	Set 3	Set 4	Set 5	Total	Report
18 Jul	11:30	Iran	3–0	Tunisia	25–13	25–19	25–19			75–51	P2
18 Jul	14:00	Russia	3–1	Czech Republic	25–22	18–25	25–21	25–13		93–81	
19 Jul	11:30	Tunisia	0–3	Czech Republic	21–25	21–25	21–25			63–75	P2
19 Jul	14:00	Iran	2–3	Russia	25–21	19–25	25–23	21–25	14–16	104–110	P2
20 Jul	11:30	Tunisia	0–3	Russia	23–25	17–25	15–25			55–75	P2
20 Jul	14:00	Iran	3–0	Czech Republic	29–27	25–18	26–24			80–69	P2

=== Pool D ===
Pos	Team	Pld	W	L	Pts	SW	SL	SR	SPW	SPL	SPR	Qualification
1	Italy	3	3	0	9	9	0	MAX	228	174	1.310	Final eight (Pools E and F)
2	Brazil	3	2	1	6	6	4	1.500	228	207	1.101	Final eight (Pools E and F)
3	Poland	3	1	2	3	4	7	0.571	251	263	0.954	9th–16th places (Pools G and H)
4	Canada	3	0	3	0	1	9	0.111	183	246	0.744	9th–16th places (Pools G and H)

Date	Time		Score		Set 1	Set 2	Set 3	Set 4	Set 5	Total	Report
18 Jul	17:00	Poland	1–3	Brazil	23–25	25–23	18–25	19–25		85–98	P2
18 Jul	19:40	Italy	3–0	Canada	25–17	25–17	25–15			75–49	P2
19 Jul	17:10	Brazil	3–0	Canada	25–15	25–19	25–13			75–47	P2
19 Jul	19:10	Poland	0–3	Italy	23–25	21–25	26–28			70–78	P2
20 Jul	17:00	Brazil	0–3	Italy	22–25	15–25	18–25			55–75	P2
20 Jul	19:05	Poland	3–1	Canada	20–25	25–20	25–18	26–24		96–87	P2

== Second round ==
- All times are Arabia Standard Time (UTC+03:00).

=== Pool E ===
Pos	Team	Pld	W	L	Pts	SW	SL	SR	SPW	SPL	SPR	Qualification
1	Brazil	3	3	0	9	9	1	9.000	249	210	1.186	Semifinals
2	Russia	3	2	1	6	7	3	2.333	239	197	1.213	Semifinals
3	China	3	1	2	3	3	6	0.500	202	213	0.948	5th–8th semifinals
4	South Korea	3	0	3	0	0	9	0.000	155	225	0.689	5th–8th semifinals

Date	Time		Score		Set 1	Set 2	Set 3	Set 4	Set 5	Total	Report
22 Jul	11:30	China	0–3	Brazil	26–28	23–25	21–25			70–78	P2
22 Jul	14:00	South Korea	0–3	Russia	16–25	13–25	15–25			44–75	P2
23 Jul	11:30	Russia	1–3	Brazil	25–21	22–25	20–25	22–25		89–96	P2
23 Jul	14:10	South Korea	0–3	China	18–25	22–25	20–25			60–75	P2
24 Jul	11:30	South Korea	0–3	Brazil	19–25	13–25	19–25			51–75	P2
24 Jul	14:00	Russia	3–0	China	25–21	25–19	25–17			75–57	P2

=== Pool F ===
Pos	Team	Pld	W	L	Pts	SW	SL	SR	SPW	SPL	SPR	Qualification
1	Italy	3	3	0	9	9	1	9.000	251	190	1.321	Semifinals
2	Iran	3	2	1	6	7	4	1.750	279	247	1.130	Semifinals
3	Argentina	3	1	2	3	4	7	0.571	243	261	0.931	5th–8th semifinals
4	Bahrain	3	0	3	0	1	9	0.111	169	244	0.693	5th–8th semifinals

Date	Time		Score		Set 1	Set 2	Set 3	Set 4	Set 5	Total	Report
22 Jul	16:30	Argentina	1–3	Iran	19–25	25–23	22–25	30–32		96–105	P2
22 Jul	19:30	Bahrain	0–3	Italy	10–25	15–25	13–25			38–75	P2
23 Jul	16:30	Italy	3–1	Iran	25–23	25–22	20–25	31–29		101–99	P2
23 Jul	19:30	Bahrain	1–3	Argentina	22–25	19–25	25–19	15–25		81–94	P2
24 Jul	16:30	Italy	3–0	Argentina	25–21	25–13	25–19			75–53	P2
24 Jul	19:00	Bahrain	0–3	Iran	18–25	14–25	18–25			50–75	P2

=== Pool G ===
Pos	Team	Pld	W	L	Pts	SW	SL	SR	SPW	SPL	SPR	Qualification
1	Czech Republic	3	2	1	7	8	5	1.600	315	288	1.094	9th–12th semifinals
2	Canada	3	2	1	5	7	6	1.167	295	287	1.028	9th–12th semifinals
3	Egypt	3	2	1	5	7	6	1.167	311	307	1.013	13th–16th semifinals
4	Puerto Rico	3	0	3	1	4	9	0.444	261	300	0.870	13th–16th semifinals

Date	Time		Score		Set 1	Set 2	Set 3	Set 4	Set 5	Total	Report
22 Jul	11:30	Puerto Rico	1–3	Canada	19–25	14–25	25–19	17–25		75–94	P2
22 Jul	14:00	Egypt	1–3	Czech Republic	27–29	27–25	26–28	21–25		101–107	P2
23 Jul	11:30	Czech Republic	2–3	Canada	19–25	25–20	26–28	25–15	15–17	110–105	P2
23 Jul	14:35	Egypt	3–2	Puerto Rico	25–23	21–25	22–25	25–19	15–12	108–104	P2
24 Jul	11:30	Egypt	3–1	Canada	26–24	25–21	26–28	25–23		102–96	P2
24 Jul	14:15	Czech Republic	3–1	Puerto Rico	25–13	25–18	20–25	28–26		98–82	P2

=== Pool H ===
Pos	Team	Pld	W	L	Pts	SW	SL	SR	SPW	SPL	SPR	Qualification
1	Cuba	3	3	0	9	9	1	9.000	255	212	1.203	9th–12th semifinals
2	Poland	3	2	1	6	7	3	2.333	252	205	1.229	9th–12th semifinals
3	Tunisia	3	1	2	2	3	8	0.375	225	252	0.893	13th–16th semifinals
4	Morocco	3	0	3	1	2	9	0.222	195	258	0.756	13th–16th semifinals

Date	Time		Score		Set 1	Set 2	Set 3	Set 4	Set 5	Total	Report
22 Jul	16:30	Cuba	3–0	Tunisia	25–19	25–19	25–22			75–60	P2
22 Jul	19:00	Morocco	0–3	Poland	16–25	16–25	11–25			43–75	P2
23 Jul	17:40	Poland	3–0	Tunisia	25–21	25–16	25–20			75–57	P2
23 Jul	19:40	Morocco	0–3	Cuba	15–25	22–25	13–25			50–75	P2
24 Jul	16:50	Morocco	2–3	Tunisia	25–19	19–25	25–23	19–25	14–16	102–108	P2
24 Jul	19:00	Poland	1–3	Cuba	25–21	24–26	22–25	31–33		102–105	P2

== Final round ==
- All times are Arabia Standard Time (UTC+03:00).

=== 13th–16th places ===
13th–16th semifinals
26 July
Egypt	3
Morocco	1
26 July
Tunisia	3
Puerto Rico	2

13th place match
27 July
Egypt	3
Tunisia	1
15th place match
27 July
Morocco	3
Puerto Rico	2

==== 13th–16th semifinals ====
Date	Time		Score		Set 1	Set 2	Set 3	Set 4	Set 5	Total	Report
26 Jul	11:30	Egypt	3–1	Morocco	25–20	18–25	25–19	25–22		93–86	P2
26 Jul	14:10	Tunisia	3–2	Puerto Rico	25–22	25–18	23–25	26–28	15–12	114–105	P2

==== 15th place match ====
Date	Time		Score		Set 1	Set 2	Set 3	Set 4	Set 5	Total	Report
27 Jul	10:00	Morocco	3–2	Puerto Rico	25–22	25–22	32–34	19–25	15–12	116–115	P2

==== 13th place match ====
Date	Time		Score		Set 1	Set 2	Set 3	Set 4	Set 5	Total	Report
27 Jul	12:30	Egypt	3–1	Tunisia	25–19	20–25	25–14	25–22		95–80	P2

=== 9th–12th places ===
9th–12th semifinals
26 July
Cuba	3
Canada	0
26 July
Czech Republic	3
Poland	2

9th place match
27 July
Cuba	0
Czech Republic	3
11th place match
27 July
Canada	2
Poland	3

==== 9th–12th semifinals ====
Date	Time		Score		Set 1	Set 2	Set 3	Set 4	Set 5	Total	Report
26 Jul	16:30	Cuba	3–0	Canada	25–19	28–26	25–19			78–64	P2
26 Jul	19:10	Czech Republic	3–2	Poland	25–20	22–25	19–25	25–20	15–9	106–99	P2

==== 11th place match ====
Date	Time		Score		Set 1	Set 2	Set 3	Set 4	Set 5	Total	Report
27 Jul	15:40	Canada	2–3	Poland	25–15	23–25	26–28	25–23	12–15	111–106	P2

==== 9th place match ====
Date	Time		Score		Set 1	Set 2	Set 3	Set 4	Set 5	Total	Report
27 Jul	18:45	Cuba	0–3	Czech Republic	26–28	24–26	20–25			70–79	P2

=== 5th–8th places ===
5th–8th semifinals
26 July
China	3
Bahrain	0
26 July
Argentina	3
South Korea	0

5th place match
27 July
China	1
Argentina	3
7th place match
27 July
Bahrain	1
South Korea	3

==== 5th–8th semifinals ====
Date	Time		Score		Set 1	Set 2	Set 3	Set 4	Set 5	Total	Report
26 Jul	11:30	China	3–0	Bahrain	25–23	25–18	25–18			75–59	P2
26 Jul	14:00	Argentina	3–0	South Korea	29–27	25–21	25–21			79–69	P2

==== 7th place match ====
Date	Time		Score		Set 1	Set 2	Set 3	Set 4	Set 5	Total	Report
27 Jul	10:00	Bahrain	1–3	South Korea	19–25	23–25	25–13	23–25		90–88	P2

==== 5th place match ====
Date	Time		Score		Set 1	Set 2	Set 3	Set 4	Set 5	Total	Report
27 Jul	12:35	China	1–3	Argentina	25–23	23–25	19–25	19–25		86–98	P2

=== Final four ===
Semifinals
26 July
Italy	3
Russia	1
26 July
Brazil	0
Iran	3

Final
27 July
Italy	2
Iran	3
3rd place match
27 July
Russia	0
Brazil	3

==== Semifinals ====
Date	Time		Score		Set 1	Set 2	Set 3	Set 4	Set 5	Total	Report
26 Jul	16:30	Italy	3–1	Russia	24–26	25–19	25–22	25–21		99–88	P2
26 Jul	19:00	Brazil	0–3	Iran	20–25	14–25	17–25			51–75	P2

==== 3rd place match ====
Date	Time		Score		Set 1	Set 2	Set 3	Set 4	Set 5	Total	Report
27 Jul	15:05	Russia	0–3	Brazil	21–25	25–27	12–25			58–77	P2

==== Final ====
Date	Time		Score		Set 1	Set 2	Set 3	Set 4	Set 5	Total	Report
27 Jul	19:00	Italy	2–3	Iran	25–17	17–25	23–25	25–22	12–15	102–104	P2

== Final standing ==
Rank	Team
1st place, gold medalist(s)	Iran
2nd place, silver medalist(s)	Italy
3rd place, bronze medalist(s)	Brazil
4	Russia
5	Argentina
6	China
7	South Korea
8	Bahrain
9	Czech Republic
10	Cuba
11	Poland
12	Canada
13	Egypt
14	Tunisia
15	Morocco
16	Puerto Rico

2019 Men's U21 World champions

Iran
1st title

12–man roster
Jelveh, Hazratpour, Toukhteh, Falahat, Daneshdoust, Feyz, Saadat, Esfandiar (c), Kamalabadi, Saberi, Yali, Sharifi
Head coach
Ataei

== Awards ==
- Most valuable player
  (Iran) Amirhossein Esfandiar
- Best setter
  (Italy) Lorenzo Sperotto
- Best outside spikers
  (Italy) Daniele Lavia
  (Iran) Morteza Sharifi
- Best middle blockers
  (Italy) Lorenzo Cortesia
  (Brazil) Guilherme Voss Santos
- Best opposite spiker
  (Russia) Maksim Sapozhkov
- Best libero
  (Iran) Mohammad Reza Hazratpour

== See also ==
- 2019 FIVB Volleyball Women's U20 World Championship
