= 2016 Men's Junior South American Volleyball Championship =

Tournament details
- Host country: Brazil
- Dates: 5–9 October
- Teams: 6
- Venue: 1 (in 1 host city)

The 2016 Men's Junior South American Volleyball Championship was the 23rd edition of the tournament, organised by South America's governing volleyball body, the Confederación Sudamericana de Voleibol (CSV). The tournament will feature six teams and takes place from 5 to 9 October, in Bariloche, Argentina. The top teams will qualify for the 2017 World Championship.

== Competing nations ==
Pool A	Pool B
Argentina; Chile; Colombia	Brazil; Bolivia; Peru

== First round ==
=== Pool A ===
Pos	Team	Pld	W	L	Pts	SW	SL	SR	SPW	SPL	SPR	Qualification
1	Argentina	2	2	0	6	6	0	MAX	152	104	1.462	Semifinals
2	Colombia	2	1	1	2	3	5	0.600	157	177	0.887	Semifinals
3	Chile	2	0	2	1	2	6	0.333	152	180	0.844	5th place match

Date	Time		Score		Set 1	Set 2	Set 3	Set 4	Set 5	Total	Report
5 Oct	17:00	Chile	2–3	Colombia	18–25	25–19	24–26	25–20	8–15	100–105	
6 Oct	17:00	Colombia	0–3	Argentina	12–25	15–25	25–27			52–77	
7 Oct	17:00	Argentina	3–0	Chile	25–15	25–15	25–22			75–52	

=== Pool B ===
Pos	Team	Pld	W	L	Pts	SW	SL	SR	SPW	SPL	SPR	Qualification
1	Brazil	2	2	0	6	6	0	MAX	150	60	2.500	Semifinals
2	Bolivia	2	1	1	3	3	4	0.750	113	164	0.689	Semifinals
3	Peru	2	0	2	0	1	6	0.167	131	170	0.771	5th place match

Date	Time		Score		Set 1	Set 2	Set 3	Set 4	Set 5	Total	Report
5 Oct	17:00	Bolivia	3–1	Peru	25–16	25–23	18–25	27–25		95–89	
6 Oct	17:00	Brazil	3–0	Bolivia	25–9	25–2	25–7			75–18	
7 Oct	17:00	Peru	0–3	Brazil	14–25	10–25	18–25			42–75	

== Final round ==
=== 5th place ===
Date	Time		Score		Set 1	Set 2	Set 3	Set 4	Set 5	Total	Report
8 Oct	13:00	Chile	3–1	Peru	25–20	25–22	25–23			75–65	

=== Championship bracket ===
Semifinals
8 Oct
Argentina	3
Bolivia	0
8 Oct
Brazil	3
Colombia	1

Final
9 Oct
Argentina	3
Brazil	0
Third place
9 Oct
Bolivia	1
Colombia	3

=== Semifinals ===
Date	Time		Score		Set 1	Set 2	Set 3	Set 4	Set 5	Total	Report
8 Oct	15:00	Argentina	3–0	Bolivia	25–9	25–15	25–15			75–39	
8 Oct	17:00	Brazil	3–1	Colombia	19–25	25–18	25–12	25–15		94–70	

=== 3rd place ===
Date	Time		Score		Set 1	Set 2	Set 3	Set 4	Set 5	Total	Report
9 Oct	13:00	Bolivia	1–3	Colombia	25–19	11–25	7–25	8–25		51–94	

=== Final ===
Date	Time		Score		Set 1	Set 2	Set 3	Set 4	Set 5	Total	Report
9 Oct	15:00	Argentina	3–0	Brazil	25–18	25–23	25–15			75–56	

Rank	Team
1st place, gold medalist(s)	Argentina
2nd place, silver medalist(s)	Brazil
3rd place, bronze medalist(s)	Colombia
4	Bolivia
5	Chile
6	Peru
