= 2024 Men's U20 Volleyball European Championship =

29th edition of the Men's Junior European Volleyball Championship

Tournament details
- Host country: Greece; Serbia
- Cities: Arta; Vrnjačka Banja
- Dates: 26 August – 7 September
- Teams: 16 (from 1 confederation)
- Venue: 2 (in 2 host cities)

Final positions
- Champions: France (2nd title)
- Runners-up: Bulgaria
- Third place: Czech Republic

The 2024 Men's U20 Volleyball European Championship is the 29th edition of the Men's Junior European Volleyball Championship, organised by Europe's governing volleyball body, the CEV. The tournament is held in Arta, Greece and Vrnjačka Banja Serbia from 26 August to 7 September 2024. The top six teams of the tournament will qualify for the 2025 FIVB Volleyball Men's U21 World Championship as the CEV representatives.

Players must be born on or after 1 January 2005.

== Host selection ==
Greece were given the hosting rights on 12 October 2022. Shortly after, Serbia was also given the hosting rights.

== Qualification ==
Means of qualification		Qualifier
Host country		Greece
Host country		Serbia
Qualification 1st round	BVA	Bulgaria
Qualification 1st round	EEVZA	Poland
Qualification 1st round	MEVZA	Slovenia
Qualification 1st round	NEVZA	Finland
Qualification 1st round	WEVZA	France
Qualification 1st round	SCA	Scotland
Qualification 2nd round	Pool A	Turkey
Qualification 2nd round	Pool B	Latvia
Qualification 2nd round	Pool C	Ukraine
Qualification 2nd round	Pool D	Austria
Qualification 2nd round	Pool E	Israel
Qualification 2nd round	Best runner up	Czech Republic
Qualification 2nd round	Best runner up	Italy
Qualification 2nd round	Best runner up	Spain

== Draw ==
The draw was on 11 April 2024 in Luxembourg.

== Venues ==
The venues are in Arta and Vrnjačka Banja.

Pool I, Final round		Pool II	
(Serbia) Vrnjačka Banja	Vrnjačka Banja is located in Serbia	Arta	Arta is located in Greece
Sportska Hala	Vrnjačka Banja is located in Serbia	Indoor Sport Hall T9 Kostakioi	Arta is located in Greece
Capacity: 1,300	Vrnjačka Banja is located in Serbia	Capacity: 1,200	Arta is located in Greece

== Group stage ==
=== Pool A ===
- All times are local.

Pos	Team	Pld	W	L	Pts	SW	SL	SR	SPW	SPL	SPR	Qualification
1	France	7	7	0	21	21	1	21.000	551	413	1.334	Semifinals and World Championship
2	Ukraine	7	5	2	15	15	8	1.875	541	519	1.042	Semifinals and World Championship
3	Turkey	7	5	2	14	15	9	1.667	559	522	1.071	World Championship
4	Poland	7	4	3	11	14	11	1.273	569	535	1.064	
5	Serbia (H)	7	3	4	10	12	13	0.923	554	565	0.981	
6	Finland	7	2	5	7	8	17	0.471	536	591	0.907	
7	Latvia	7	2	5	6	8	15	0.533	479	547	0.876	
8	Austria	7	0	7	0	2	21	0.095	473	570	0.830	

Source: Report
(H) Host

Date	Time		Score		Set 1	Set 2	Set 3	Set 4	Set 5	Total	Report
27 August	12:00	Turkey	3–1	Poland	26–24	21–25	25–19	25–21		97–89	Report
27 August	14:30	Austria	1–3	Finland	25–27	16–25	25–16	21–25		87–93	Report
27 August	17:30	Latvia	1–3	Serbia	25–22	16–25	18–25	16–25		75–97	Report
27 August	20:00	Ukraine	0–3	France	21–25	16–25	16–25			53–75	Report
28 August	12:00	Latvia	3–0	Finland	25–20	25–19	25–22			75–61	Report
28 August	14:30	Turkey	0–3	Ukraine	24–26	19–25	21–25			64–76	Report
28 August	17:30	Serbia	0–3	France	20–25	17–25	16–25			53–75	Report
28 August	20:00	Poland	3–0	Austria	25–14	25–17	25–18			75–49	Report
29 August	12:00	Finland	0–3	France	14–25	21–25	21–25			56–75	Report
29 August	14:30	Ukraine	3–1	Poland	25–17	28–26	21–25	25–20		99–88	Report
29 August	17:30	Austria	0–3	Serbia	22–25	23–25	23–25			68–75	Report
29 August	20:00	Latvia	0–3	Turkey	18–25	22–25	16–25			56–75	Report
31 August	12:00	France	3–0	Austria	25–18	25–21	25–13			75–52	Report
31 August	14:30	Turkey	3–2	Finland	24–26	19–25	25–23	25–19	15–12	108–105	Report
31 August	17:30	Serbia	3–0	Ukraine	25–20	25–23	25–19			75–62	Report
31 August	20:00	Poland	3–0	Latvia	25–14	25–19	25–19			75–52	Report
1 September	12:00	Ukraine	3–0	Finland	25–21	26–24	25–21			76–66	Report
1 September	14:30	Latvia	3–0	Austria	25–17	25–23	27–25			77–65	Report
1 September	17:30	Poland	3–2	Serbia	25–27	23–25	25–21	25–22	15–10	113–105	Report
1 September	20:00	Turkey	0–3	France	17–25	21–25	26–28			64–78	Report
3 September	12:00	Ukraine	3–0	Latvia	25–16	25–23	26–24			76–63	Report
3 September	14:30	France	3–0	Poland	25–19	25–18	25–17			75–54	Report
3 September	17:30	Finland	3–1	Serbia	29–27	18–25	25–22	25–21		97–95	Report
3 September	20:00	Austria	0–3	Turkey	24–26	18–25	22–25			64–76	Report
4 September	12:00	Finland	0–3	Poland	20–25	18–25	20–25			58–75	Report
4 September	14:30	France	3–1	Latvia	23–25	25–16	25–21	25–19		98–81	Report
4 September	17:30	Serbia	0–3	Turkey	18–25	20–25	16–25			54–75	Report
4 September	20:00	Austria	1–3	Ukraine	23–25	18–25	26–24	21–25		88–99	Report

=== Pool B ===
Pos	Team	Pld	W	L	Pts	SW	SL	SR	SPW	SPL	SPR	Qualification
1	Bulgaria	7	6	1	18	19	3	6.333	543	438	1.240	Semifinals and World Championship
2	Czech Republic	7	6	1	17	18	8	2.250	613	519	1.181	Semifinals and World Championship
3	Italy	7	5	2	15	16	7	2.286	539	469	1.149	World Championship
4	Israel	7	5	2	15	16	7	2.286	537	486	1.105	
5	Slovenia	7	3	4	8	10	14	0.714	526	519	1.013	
6	Greece (H)	7	2	5	5	6	17	0.353	463	523	0.885	
7	Spain	7	1	6	6	10	18	0.556	577	595	0.970	
8	Scotland	7	0	7	0	0	21	0.000	276	525	0.526	

Source: Report
(H) Host

Date	Time		Score		Set 1	Set 2	Set 3	Set 4	Set 5	Total	Report
26 August	12:00	Slovenia	0–3	Bulgaria	20–25	22–25	23–25			65–75	Report
26 August	14:30	Israel	3–0	Italy	25–18	25–21	25–23			75–62	Report
26 August	17:30	Spain	2–3	Czech Republic	25–23	18–25	25–22	23–25	12–15	103–110	Report
26 August	20:00	Greece	3–0	Scotland	25–16	25–13	25–14			75–43	Report
27 August	12:00	Italy	3–0	Spain	25–23	25–15	25–20			75–58	Report
27 August	14:30	Scotland	0–3	Bulgaria	13–25	11–25	20–25			44–75	Report
27 August	17:30	Czech Republic	3–1	Slovenia	17–25	25–16	26–24	25–16		93–81	Report
27 August	20:00	Greece	0–3	Israel	17–25	23–25	16–25			56–75	Report
28 August	12:00	Bulgaria	3–0	Czech Republic	25–19	30–28	25–21			80–68	Report
28 August	14:30	Israel	3–0	Scotland	25–14	25–21	25–13			75–48	Report
28 August	17:30	Slovenia	0–3	Italy	23–25	18–25	19–25			60–75	Report
28 August	20:00	Spain	2–3	Greece	25–18	21–25	25–21	25–21	15–8	111–93	Report
30 August	12:00	Scotland	0–3	Czech Republic	8–25	11–25	14–25			33–75	Report
30 August	14:30	Israel	3–1	Spain	25–23	17–25	25–21	25–18		92–87	Report
30 August	17:30	Italy	3–1	Bulgaria	15–25	25–21	25–20	25–21		90–87	Report
30 August	20:00	Greece	0–3	Slovenia	23–25	22–25	17–25			62–75	Report
31 August	12:00	Spain	3–0	Scotland	25–7	25–12	25–13			75–32	Report
31 August	14:30	Slovenia	0–3	Israel	21–25	23–25	19–25			63–75	Report
31 August	17:30	Czech Republic	3–1	Italy	22–25	25–19	25–22	25–16		97–82	Report
31 August	20:00	Bulgaria	3–0	Greece	25–16	25–13	25–20			75–49	Report
2 September	12:00	Spain	2–3	Slovenia	15–25	22–25	25–22	25–20	11–15	98–107	Report
2 September	14:30	Scotland	0–3	Italy	11–25	9–25	16–25			36–75	Report
2 September	17:30	Israel	0–3	Bulgaria	24–26	19–25	23–25			66–76	Report
2 September	20:00	Greece	0–3	Czech Republic	18–25	21–25	22–25			61–75	Report
3 September	12:00	Slovenia	3–0	Scotland	25–17	25–14	25–10			75–41	Report
3 September	14:30	Czech Republic	3–1	Israel	25–21	25–15	20–25	25–18		95–79	Report
3 September	17:30	Bulgaria	3–0	Spain	25–18	25–17	25–21			75–56	Report
3 September	20:00	Italy	3–0	Greece	25–15	30–28	25–13			80–56	Report

== Final round ==
=== Final four ===
Semifinals
6 Sept – Vrnjačka Banja
France	3
Czech Republic	0
6 Sept – Vrnjačka Banja
Bulgaria	3
Ukraine	0

Final
7 Sept – Vrnjačka Banja
France	3
Bulgaria	1
3rd place match
7 Sept – Vrnjačka Banja
Czech Republic	3
Ukraine	1

==== Semifinals ====
Date	Time		Score		Set 1	Set 2	Set 3	Set 4	Set 5	Total	Report
6 Sept	15:00	France	3–0	Czech Republic	26–24	25–12	25–16			76–52	Report
6 Sept	18:00	Bulgaria	3–0	Ukraine	25–22	25–20	25–20			75–62	Report

==== 3rd place match ====
Date	Time		Score		Set 1	Set 2	Set 3	Set 4	Set 5	Total	Report
7 Sept	15:00	Czech Republic	3–1	Ukraine	25–27	25–23	25–15	25–22	–	100–87	Report

==== Final ====
Date	Time		Score		Set 1	Set 2	Set 3	Set 4	Set 5	Total	Report
7 Sept	18:00	France	3–1	Bulgaria	22–25	25–18	25–16	28–26		100–85	Report

== Final standing ==
Rank	Team
1st place, gold medalist(s)	France
2nd place, silver medalist(s)	Bulgaria
3rd place, bronze medalist(s)	Czech Republic
4	Ukraine
5	Italy
6	Turkey
7	Israel
8	Poland
9	Serbia
10	Slovenia
11	Finland
12	Greece
13	Latvia
14	Spain
15	Austria
16	Scotland

Qualified for the 2025 U21 World Championship
