= 2012 Men's Junior European Volleyball Championship =

Tournament details
- Host country: Poland; Denmark
- Dates: August 24 – September 2
- Teams: 12
- Venues: 2 (in 2 host cities)

Final positions
- Champions: Italy (3rd title)

Tournament awards
- MVP: Sandro Caci (ITA)

The 2012 Men's Junior European Volleyball Championship was the 23rd edition of the Men's Junior European Volleyball Championship, organised by Europe's governing volleyball body, the CEV. It was held Gdynia, Poland and Randers, Denmark from August 24 to September 2, 2012.

Italy won their 3rd title in the tournament by defeating Spain. Sandro Caci was elected the Most Valuable Player.

== Participating teams ==
- Host
  - Poland
  - Denmark
- Defending Champion
  - Russia
- Qualified through 2012 Men's Junior European Volleyball Championship Qualification
  - Belgium
  - Bulgaria
  - Finland
  - Germany
  - Greece
  - Italy
  - Spain
  - Serbia
  - Turkey

== Venues ==
Pool I and Final round	Pool II
Gdynia, Poland	Randers, Denmark
Gdynia Sports Arena	Skyline Arena
Capacity: 5,500	Capacity: 3,000

== Preliminary round ==
- All times are Central European Summer Time (UTC+02:00)

=== Pool I ===
Pos	Team	Pld	W	L	Pts	SPW	SPL	SPR	SW	SL	SR	Qualification
1	Italy	5	4	1	12	437	386	1.132	14	5	2.800	Semifinals
2	Belgium	5	4	1	11	393	360	1.092	12	5	2.400	Semifinals
3	Poland	5	3	2	10	483	454	1.064	11	6	1.833	5th–8th classification
4	Russia	5	3	2	8	382	376	1.016	6	6	1.000	5th–8th classification
5	Serbia	5	1	4	3	324	382	0.848	3	13	0.231	
6	Finland	5	0	5	1	394	455	0.866	4	15	0.267	

Date	Time		Score		Set 1	Set 2	Set 3	Set 4	Set 5	Total	Report
25 Aug	15:30	Serbia	0–3	Belgium	20–25	21–25	19–25			60–75	Report
25 Aug	18:00	Russia	0–3	Italy	21–25	18–25	21–25			60–75	Report
25 Aug	20:30	Finland	1–3	Poland	25–23	20–25	20–25	21–25		86–98	Report
26 Aug	15:30	Serbia	0–3	Russia	23–25	25–27	17–25			65–77	Report
26 Aug	18:00	Italy	3–2	Finland	19–25	33–35	25–23	25–18	15–12	117–113	Report
26 Aug	20:30	Belgium	3–2	Poland	25–17	20–25	25–22	22–25	15–11	107–100	Report
27 Aug	15:30	Finland	1–3	Serbia	24–26	10–25	25–14	21–25		80–90	Report
27 Aug	18:00	Russia	0–3	Belgium	23–25	25–27	15–25			63–77	Report
27 Aug	20:30	Poland	3–2	Italy	21–25	18–25	25–20	25–19	15–6	104–95	Report
29 Aug	15:30	Russia	3–0	Finland	25–15	25–21	25–17			75–53	Report
29 Aug	18:00	Belgium	0–3	Italy	17–25	19–25	23–25			59–75	Report
29 Aug	20:30	Serbia	0–3	Poland	21–25	16–25	22–25			59–75	Report
30 Aug	15:30	Finland	0–3	Belgium	17–25	22–25	23–25			62–75	Report
30 Aug	18:00	Italy	3–0	Serbia	25–22	25–13	25–15			75–50	Report
30 Aug	20:30	Poland	2–3	Russia	23–25	28–26	17–25	25–16	13–15	106–107	Report

=== Pool II ===
Pos	Team	Pld	W	L	Pts	SPW	SPL	SPR	SW	SL	SR	Qualification
1	Spain	5	5	0	14	430	359	1.198	15	3	5.000	Semifinals
2	Turkey	5	3	2	11	457	416	1.099	13	7	1.857	Semifinals
3	Bulgaria	5	4	1	10	433	418	1.036	12	7	1.714	5th–8th classification
4	Germany	5	2	3	5	406	413	0.983	7	12	0.583	5th–8th classification
5	Greece	5	1	4	5	443	473	0.937	8	13	0.615	
6	Denmark	5	0	5	0	327	417	0.784	2	15	0.133	

Date	Time		Score		Set 1	Set 2	Set 3	Set 4	Set 5	Total	Report
24 Aug	15:00	Greece	0–3	Spain	25–27	20–25	17–25			62–77	Report
24 Aug	17:30	Germany	0–3	Turkey	22–25	16–25	20–25			58–75	Report
24 Aug	20:00	Bulgaria	3–0	Denmark	25–23	25–19	25–21			75–63	Report
25 Aug	15:00	Spain	3–1	Germany	25–23	25–16	20–25	25–22		95–86	Report
25 Aug	17:30	Denmark	0–3	Turkey	16–25	17–25	16–25			49–75	Report
25 Aug	20:00	Bulgaria	3–2	Greece	20–25	25–19	25–23	23–25	15–11	108–103	Report
26 Aug	15:00	Turkey	2–3	Spain	22–25	13–25	25–23	25–20	13–15	98–108	Report
26 Aug	17:30	Greece	3–1	Denmark	25–19	17–25	28–26	25–21		95–91	Report
26 Aug	20:00	Germany	0–3	Bulgaria	19–25	23–25	19–25			61–75	Report
28 Aug	15:00	Denmark	0–3	Spain	20–25	15–25	19–25			54–75	Report
28 Aug	17:30	Bulgaria	3–2	Turkey	22–25	22–25	28–26	27–25	17–15	116–116	Report
28 Aug	20:00	Greece	2–3	Germany	20–25	25–19	25–20	17–25	11–15	98–104	Report
29 Aug	15:00	Spain	3–0	Bulgaria	25–16	25–23	25–20			75–59	Report
29 Aug	17:30	Turkey	3–1	Greece	25–20	25–18	18–25	25–22		93–85	Report
29 Aug	20:00	Germany	3–1	Denmark	25–12	25–19	22–25	25–14		97–70	Report

== Final round ==
- All times are Central European Summer Time (UTC+02:00)

=== 5th–8th place ===
Semifinals
Gdynia
Poland	3
Germany	1
Gdynia
Russia	3
Bulgaria	2

Final
Gdynia
Poland	1
Russia	3
Third place
Gdynia
Germany	0
Bulgaria	3

==== 5th–8th semifinals ====
Date	Time		Score		Set 1	Set 2	Set 3	Set 4	Set 5	Total	Report
1 Sep	13:00	Poland	3–1	Germany	25–10	23–25	25–20	25–19		98–74	Report
1 Sep	15:30	Russia	3–2	Bulgaria	25–20	25–22	21–25	15–25	15–6	101–98	Report

==== 7th place match ====
Date	Time		Score		Set 1	Set 2	Set 3	Set 4	Set 5	Total	Report
2 Sep	10:00	Germany	0–3	Bulgaria	16–25	16–25	22–25			54–75	Report

=== 5th place match ===
Date	Time		Score		Set 1	Set 2	Set 3	Set 4	Set 5	Total	Report
2 Sep	12:30	Poland	1–3	Russia	23–25	25–20	27–29	19–25		94–99	Report

=== Final ===
Semifinals
Gdynia
Italy	3
Turkey	1
Gdynia
Belgium	1
Spain	3

Final
Gdynia
Italy	3
Spain	1
Third place
Gdynia
Turkey	2
Belgium	3

=== Semifinals ===
Date	Time		Score		Set 1	Set 2	Set 3	Set 4	Set 5	Total	Report
1 Sep	18:00	Italy	3–1	Turkey	25–14	23–25	25–22	25–20		98–81	Report
1 Sep	20:30	Belgium	1–3	Spain	23–25	21–25	25–21	25–16		94–87	Report

=== 3rd place match ===
Date	Time		Score		Set 1	Set 2	Set 3	Set 4	Set 5	Total	Report
2 Sep	15:30	Turkey	2–3	Belgium	24–26	25–17	25–21	22–25	15–17	111–106	Report

=== Final ===
Date	Time		Score		Set 1	Set 2	Set 3	Set 4	Set 5	Total	Report
2 Sep	18:00	Italy	3–1	Spain	25–21	14–25	25–23	25–22		89–91	Report

== Final standing ==
Rank	Team
1st place, gold medalist(s)	Italy
2nd place, silver medalist(s)	Spain
3rd place, bronze medalist(s)	Belgium
4	Turkey
5	Russia
6	Poland
7	Bulgaria
8	Germany
9	Greece
10	Serbia
11	Finland
12	Denmark

2012 Men's Junior European champions

Italy
3rd title

12–man Roster
Enrico Diamantini, Gabriele Nelli, Marco Izzo, Luigi Randazzo, Daniele Tailli, Simmaco Tartaglione, Luca Spirito, Sandro Caci, Fabio Ricci, Roberto Rivan, Luca Borgogno, Andrea Mattei
Head coach
Marco Bonitta

== Individual awards ==
- Most valuable player
  - Sandro Caci (ITA)
- Best scorer
  - Andrés Villena (ESP)
- Best spiker
  - Andrés Villena (ESP)
- Best blocker
  - Ivan Demakov (RUS)
- Best server
  - Luca Borgogno (ITA)
- Best setter
  - Koen Thijs (BEL)
- Best receiver
  - Baturalp Burak Güngör (TUR)
- Best libero
  - Roberto Rivan (ITA)
