= 2010 Men's Junior European Volleyball Championship =

2010 Men's U20 Volleyball European Championship
Tournament details
- Host country: Belarus
- Dates: 28 August – 5 September
- Teams: 12
- Venues: 2 (in 2 host cities)

Final positions
- Champions: Russia (17th title)

Tournament awards
- MVP: Igor Filippov (RUS)

The 2010 CEV U20 Volleyball European Championship is the 22nd edition of the Men's Junior European Volleyball Championship, organised by CEV. It was played in Belarus from August 28 to September 5, 2010.

== Participating teams ==
- Host Country
  - Belarus
- Qualified through 2010 Men's U20 Volleyball European Championship Qualification
  - Belgium
  - Bulgaria
  - France
  - Germany
  - Italy
  - Netherlands
  - Poland
  - Spain
  - Serbia
  - Turkey

== Pools composition ==
Pool I	Pool II
Belgium	Belarus
Germany	Bulgaria
Netherlands	France
Poland	Italy
Russia	Spain
Turkey	Serbia

== Venues ==
Pool I and Final round	Pool II
Babruysk, Belarus	Mogilev, Belarus
Babruysk Arena	Olimpiets
Capacity: 7,151	Capacity:

== Preliminary round ==
- All times are Further-eastern European Time (UTC+03:00)

=== Pool I ===
Pos	Team	Pld	W	L	Pts	SW	SL	SR	SPW	SPL	SPR	Qualification
1	Russia	5	5	0	14	15	3	5.000	429	365	1.175	Semifinals
2	Netherlands	5	3	2	9	11	8	1.375	411	420	0.979	Semifinals
3	Germany	5	3	2	9	11	9	1.222	446	425	1.049	5th–8th semifinals
4	Belgium	5	2	3	7	9	10	0.900	416	436	0.954	5th–8th semifinals
5	Poland	5	2	3	5	7	12	0.583	407	410	0.993	
6	Turkey	5	0	5	1	4	15	0.267	389	442	0.880	

Date	Time		Score		Set 1	Set 2	Set 3	Set 4	Set 5	Total	Report
28 Aug	15:00	Germany	0–3	Netherlands	21–25	22–25	20–25			63–75	Report
28 Aug	17:30	Russia	3–0	Belgium	25–20	25–21	25–21			75–62	Report
28 Aug	20:00	Turkey	2–3	Poland	20–25	12–25	25–20	25–16	10–15	92–101	Report
29 Aug	15:00	Germany	2–3	Russia	21–25	25–21	21–25	25–20	11–15	103–106	Report
29 Aug	17:30	Netherlands	3–1	Poland	25–18	25–21	9–25	25–23		84–87	Report
29 Aug	20:00	Belgium	3–0	Turkey	25–23	25–21	25–23			75–67	Report
30 Aug	15:00	Russia	3–1	Netherlands	14–25	25–20	25–14	25–13		89–72	Report
30 Aug	17:30	Turkey	1–3	Germany	25–19	22–25	16–25	22–25		85–94	Report
30 Aug	20:00	Poland	3–1	Belgium	23–25	25–15	25–17	25–20		98–77	Report
1 Sep	15:00	Russia	3–0	Turkey	25–19	27–25	25–17			77–61	Report
1 Sep	17:30	Netherlands	1–3	Belgium	22–25	25–22	16–25	22–25		85–97	Report
1 Sep	20:00	Germany	3–0	Poland	25–23	25–16	25–15			75–54	Report
2 Sep	15:00	Turkey	1–3	Netherlands	25–20	23–25	20–25	16–25		84–95	Report
2 Sep	17:30	Poland	0–3	Russia	21–25	30–32	16–25			67–82	Report
2 Sep	20:00	Belgium	2–3	Germany	25–27	25–23	25–21	21–25	9–15	105–111	Report

=== Pool II ===
Pos	Team	Pld	W	L	Pts	SW	SL	SR	SPW	SPL	SPR	Qualification
1	Bulgaria	4	3	1	10	11	5	2.200	457	399	1.145	Semifinals
2	Serbia	5	4	1	10	13	8	1.625	500	465	1.075	Semifinals
3	Spain	4	2	2	6	9	8	1.125	435	440	0.989	5th–8th semifinals
4	Italy	5	2	3	7	9	11	0.818	431	444	0.971	5th–8th semifinals
5	Belarus	5	2	3	6	8	10	0.800	393	410	0.959	
6	France	4	1	3	3	4	10	0.400	382	440	0.868	

Date	Time		Score		Set 1	Set 2	Set 3	Set 4	Set 5	Total	Report
28 Aug	15:00	Spain	3–2	Italy	20–25	25–17	25–16	20–25	18–16	108–99	Report
28 Aug	17:30	Belarus	1–3	Bulgaria	25–20	21–25	18–25	18–25		82–95	Report
28 Aug	20:00	Serbia	3–0	France	25–18	31–29	25–20			81–67	Report
29 Aug	15:00	Bulgaria	3–0	Italy	25–22	25–21	25–13			75–56	Report
29 Aug	17:30	Belarus	1–3	Serbia	25–20	18–25	20–25	17–25		80–95	Report
29 Aug	20:00	France	3–1	Spain	14–25	25–20	25–23	25–21		89–89	Report
30 Aug	15:00	Serbia	3–2	Bulgaria	25–23	26–28	30–32	25–21	15–11	121–115	Report
30 Aug	17:30	Spain	3–0	Belarus	25–17	29–27	25–22			79–66	Report
30 Aug	20:00	Italy	3–1	France	25–21	23–25	25–14	25–19		98–79	Report
1 Sep	15:00	Serbia	3–2	Spain	25–18	25–23	23–25	23–25	15–10	111–101	Report
1 Sep	17:30	Belarus	3–1	Italy	25–21	25–13	15–25	25–17		90–76	Report
1 Sep	20:00	Bulgaria	3–1	France	25–16	22–25	25–19	25–22		97–82	Report
2 Sep	15:00	Italy	3–1	Serbia	34–32	25–19	18–25	25–16		102–92	Report
2 Sep	17:30	France	0–3	Belarus	21–25	22–25	22–25			65–75	Report
2 Sep	20:00	Spain	0–3	Bulgaria	19–25	22–25	17–25			58–75	Report

== Final round ==
- All times are Further-eastern European Time (UTC+03:00)

=== 5th–8th place ===
Semifinals
4 September
Germany	3
Italy	2
4 September
Belgium	0
Spain	3

5th place
5 September
Germany	2
Spain	3
7th place
5 September
Italy	3
Belgium	1

==== 5th–8th semifinals ====
Date	Time		Score		Set 1	Set 2	Set 3	Set 4	Set 5	Total	Report
4 Sep	17:00	Germany	3–2	Italy	25–21	14–25	21–25	25–20	15–13	100–104	Report
4 Sep	19:30	Belgium	0–3	Spain	21–25	20–25	17–25			58–75	Report

==== 7th place match ====
Date	Time		Score		Set 1	Set 2	Set 3	Set 4	Set 5	Total	Report
5 Sep	15:00	Italy	3–1	Belgium	25–23	22–25	25–21	25–19		97–88	Report

==== 5th place match ====
Date	Time		Score		Set 1	Set 2	Set 3	Set 4	Set 5	Total	Report
5 Sep	17:30	Germany	2–3	Spain	25–23	36–34	19–25	14–25	10–15	104–122	Report

=== Final ===
Semifinals
4 September
Russia	3
Serbia	0
4 September
Bulgaria	3
Netherlands	0

Final
5 September
Russia	3
Bulgaria	1
Third place
5 September
Serbia	3
Netherlands	2

==== Semifinals ====
Date	Time		Score		Set 1	Set 2	Set 3	Set 4	Set 5	Total	Report
4 Sep	17:00	Russia	3–0	Serbia	27–25	25–20	25–20			77–65	Report
4 Sep	19:30	Bulgaria	3–0	Netherlands	29–27	26–24	25–20			80–71	Report

==== 3rd place match ====
Date	Time		Score		Set 1	Set 2	Set 3	Set 4	Set 5	Total	Report
5 Sep	15:00	Serbia	3–2	Netherlands	21–25	25–23	25–20	22–25	15–10	108–103	Report

==== Final ====
Date	Time		Score		Set 1	Set 2	Set 3	Set 4	Set 5	Total	Report
5 Sep	17:30	Russia	3–1	Bulgaria	23–25	25–20	25–15	25–21		98–81	Report

== Final standing ==
Rank	Team
1st place, gold medalist(s)	Russia
2nd place, silver medalist(s)	Bulgaria
3rd place, bronze medalist(s)	Serbia
4	Netherlands
5	Spain
6	Germany
7	Italy
8	Belgium
9	Belarus
10	Poland
11	France
12	Turkey

2010 Men's U20 European champions

Russia
17th title

12–man Roster
Igor Filippov, Alexander Safonov, Dmitry Kovalev, Oleg Tsentalovich, Nikita Stulenkov, Aleksey Kabeshov, Andrey Kolesnik, Aleksey Pluzhnikov, Yaroslav Ostrakhovskiy, Ivan Nikishin, Sergey Kindinov
Head coach
Sergey Shlyapnikov

== Individual awards ==
- Most valuable player
  - Igor Filippov (RUS)
- Best scorer
  - Sjoerd Hoogendoorn (NED)
- Best spiker
  - Aleksandar Atanasijević (SRB)
- Best blocker
  - Igor Filippov (RUS)
- Best server
  - Oleg Tsentalovich (RUS)
- Best setter
  - Dmitry Kovalev (RUS)
- Best receiver
  - Nikolay Penchev (BUL)
- Best libero
  - Aleksey Kabeshov (RUS)
