= 2012–13 PGE Skra Bełchatów season =

PGE Skra Bełchatów
2012–13 season
- Chairman: Konrad Piechocki
- Manager: Jacek Nawrocki

PGE Skra Bełchatów 2012–2013 season is the 2012/2013 volleyball season for Polish professional volleyball club PGE Skra Bełchatów. The club won bronze medal of FIVB Volleyball Club World Championship, was 5th team of PlusLiga, lost in quarterfinals of Polish Cup and lost in playoff 12 of CEV Champions League.

The club competed in:

- Polish Championship
- Polish Cup
- CEV Champions League
- FIVB Club World Championship
- ENEA Polish SuperCup

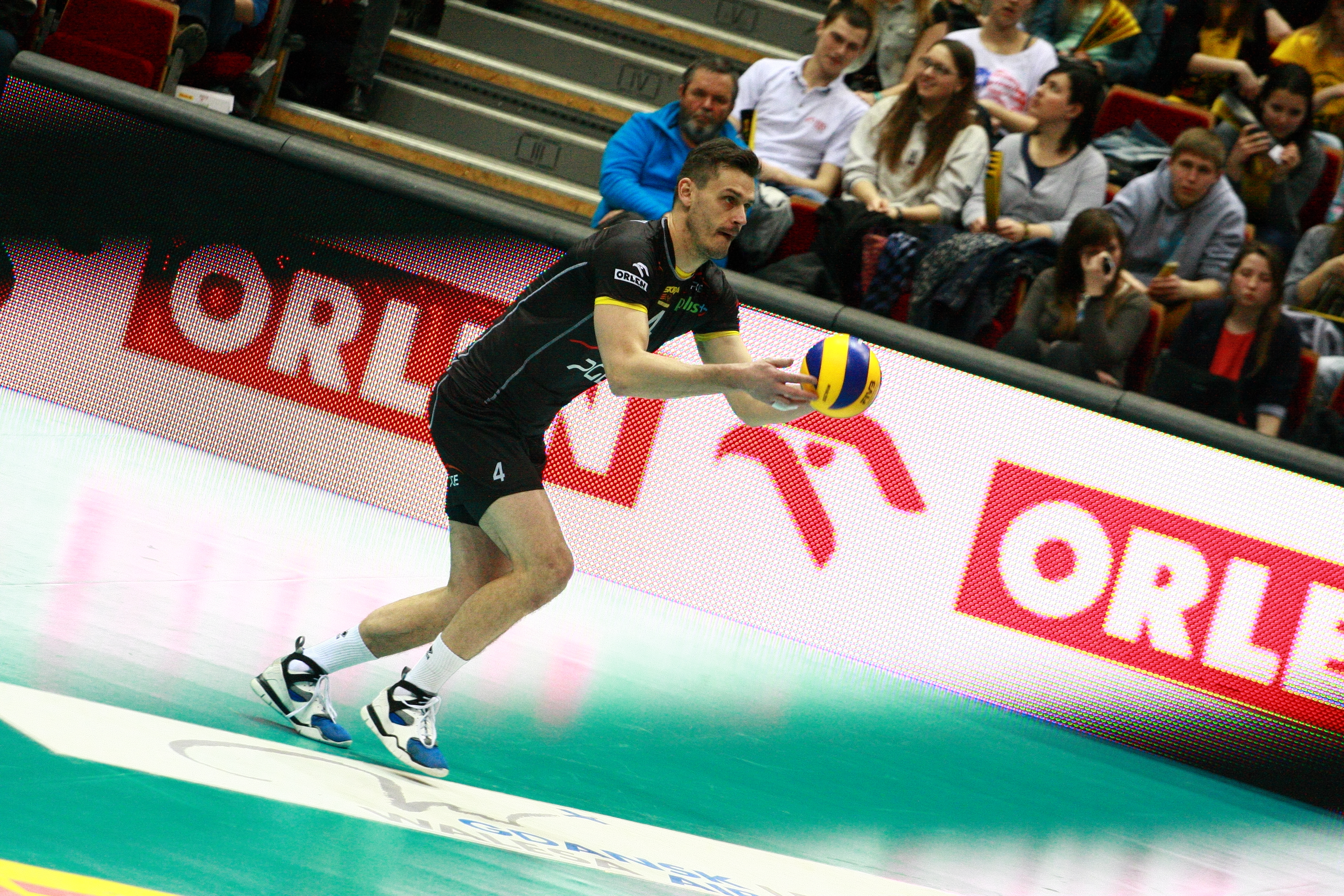
Daniel Pliński (middle blocker) during the match against Lotos Trefl Gdańsk in PlusLiga on March 17, 2013.

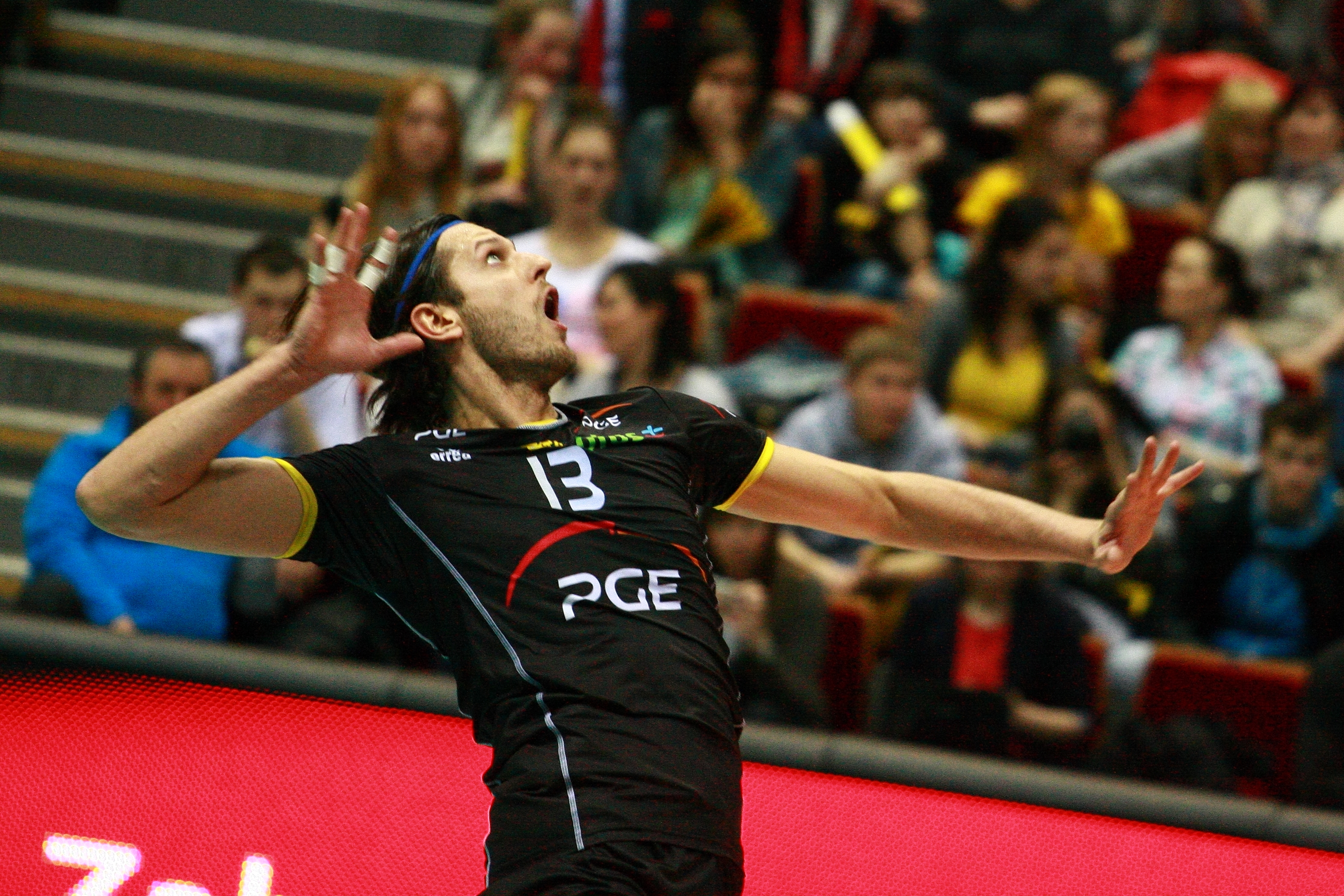
Michał Winiarski (outside hitter) during the match against Lotos Trefl Gdańsk in PlusLiga on March 17, 2013.

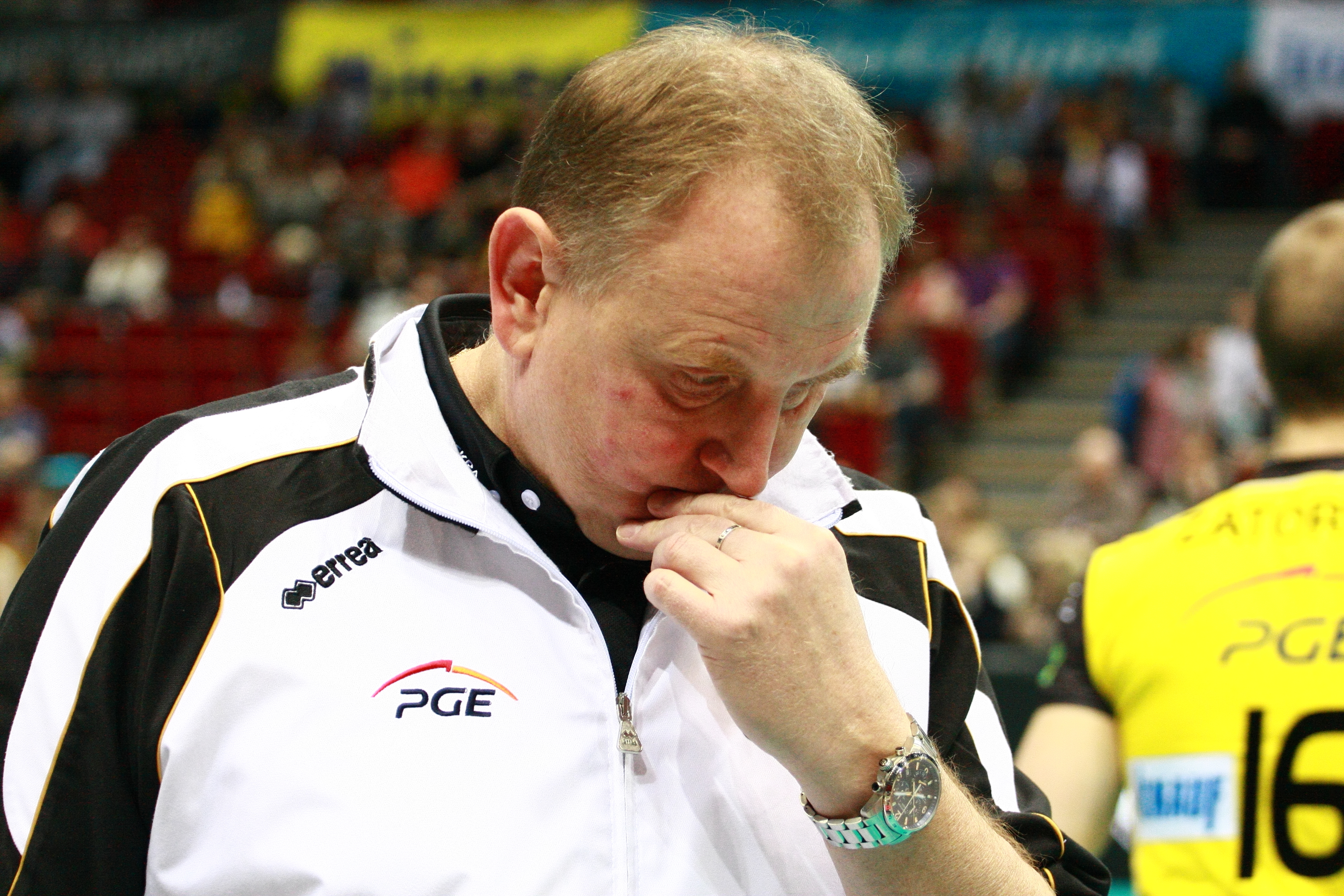
Jacek Nawrocki - coach of PGE Skra Bełchatów in 2009–2013.

== Team roster ==
Head coach:	Jacek Nawrocki
Assistant:	Maciej Bartodziejski

No.	Name	Date of birth	Position
2	(Poland) Mariusz Wlazły (C)	August 4, 1983	opposite
3	(Poland) Łukasz Zugaj	January 27, 1993	setter
4	(Poland) Daniel Pliński	December 10, 1978	middle blocker
5	(Netherlands) Wytze Kooistra	June 3, 1982	middle blocker
6	(Poland) Karol Kłos	August 8, 1989	middle blocker
7	(Poland) Kacper Turboś	June 12, 1993	libero
8	(Serbia) Konstantin Čupković	February 2, 1987	outside hitter
9	(Poland) Maciej Muzaj	May 21, 1994	opposite
10	(Italy) Dante Boninfante	March 7, 1977	setter
12	(Poland) Paweł Woicki	June 19, 1983	setter
13	(Poland) Michał Winiarski	September 28, 1983	outside hitter
14	(Serbia) Aleksandar Atanasijević	September 4, 1991	opposite
16	(Poland) Paweł Zatorski	June 21, 1990	libero
17	(Poland) Jędrzej Maćkowiak	October 17, 1992	middle blocker
18	(Poland) Michał Bąkiewicz	February 22, 1983	outside hitter

== Squad changes for the 2012–2013 season ==
In:

No.	Player	Position	From
3	(Poland) Łukasz Zugaj	setter	Czarni Radom
9	(Poland) Maciej Muzaj	opposite	SMS PZPS Spała
9	(Slovenia) Dejan Vinčić	setter	ACH Volley
10	(Italy) Dante Boninfante	setter	Al-Arabi Doha
17	(Cuba) Yosleyder Cala	outside hitter	Tours VB

Out:

No.	Player	Position	To
7	(Poland) Bartosz Kurek	outside hitter	VC Dynamo Moscow
8	(Poland) Robert Milczarek	libero	Effector Kielce
10	(Spain) Miguel Angel Falasca	setter	Ural Ufa
17	(Poland) Marcin Możdżonek	middle blocker	ZAKSA Kędzierzyn-Koźle
9	(Slovenia) Dejan Vinčić	setter	Maliye Milli Piyango Ankara
17	(Cuba) Yosleyder Cala	outside hitter	Ziraat Bankası Ankara

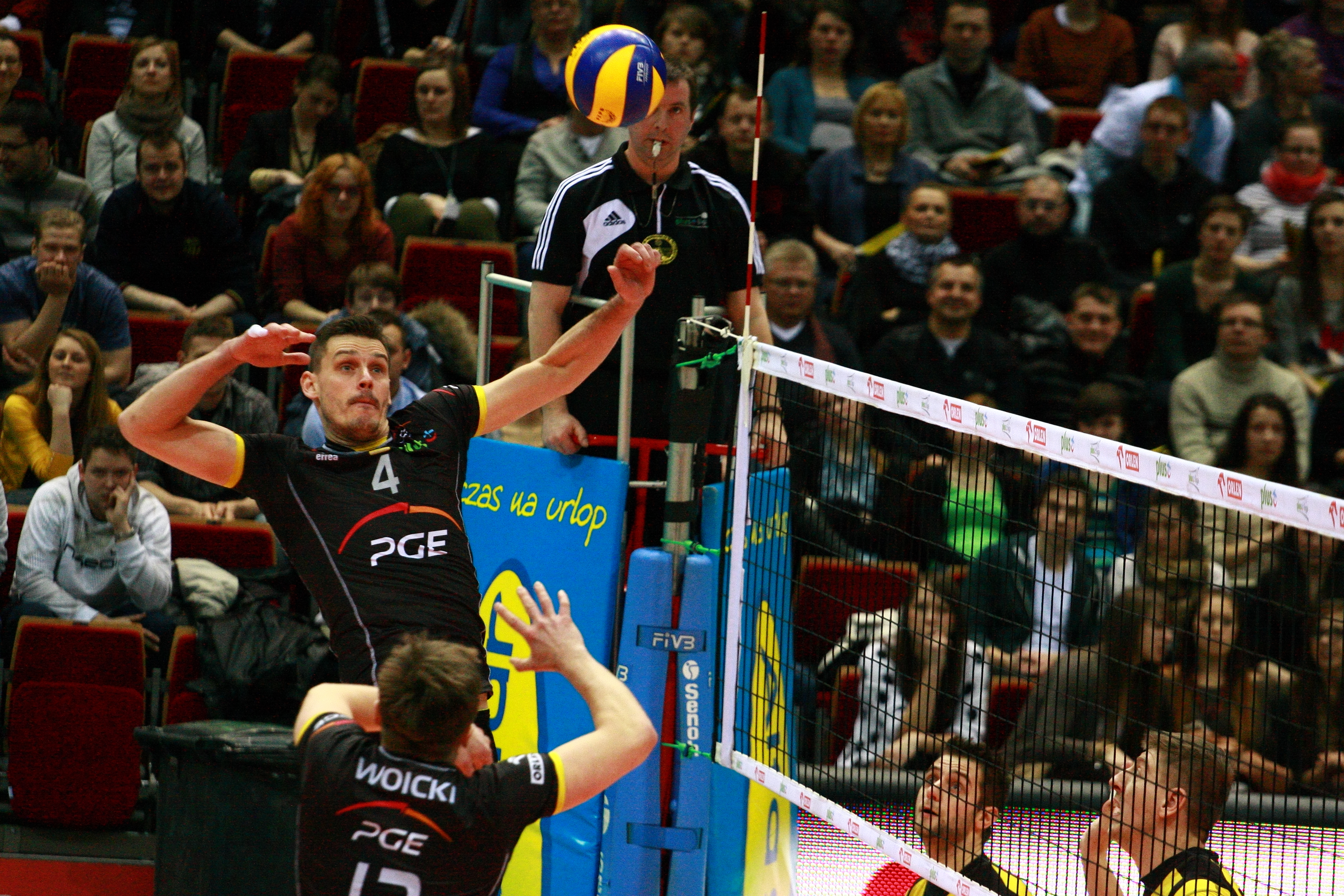
Daniel Pliński and Paweł Woicki during the match against Lotos Trefl Gdańsk in PlusLiga on March 17, 2013.

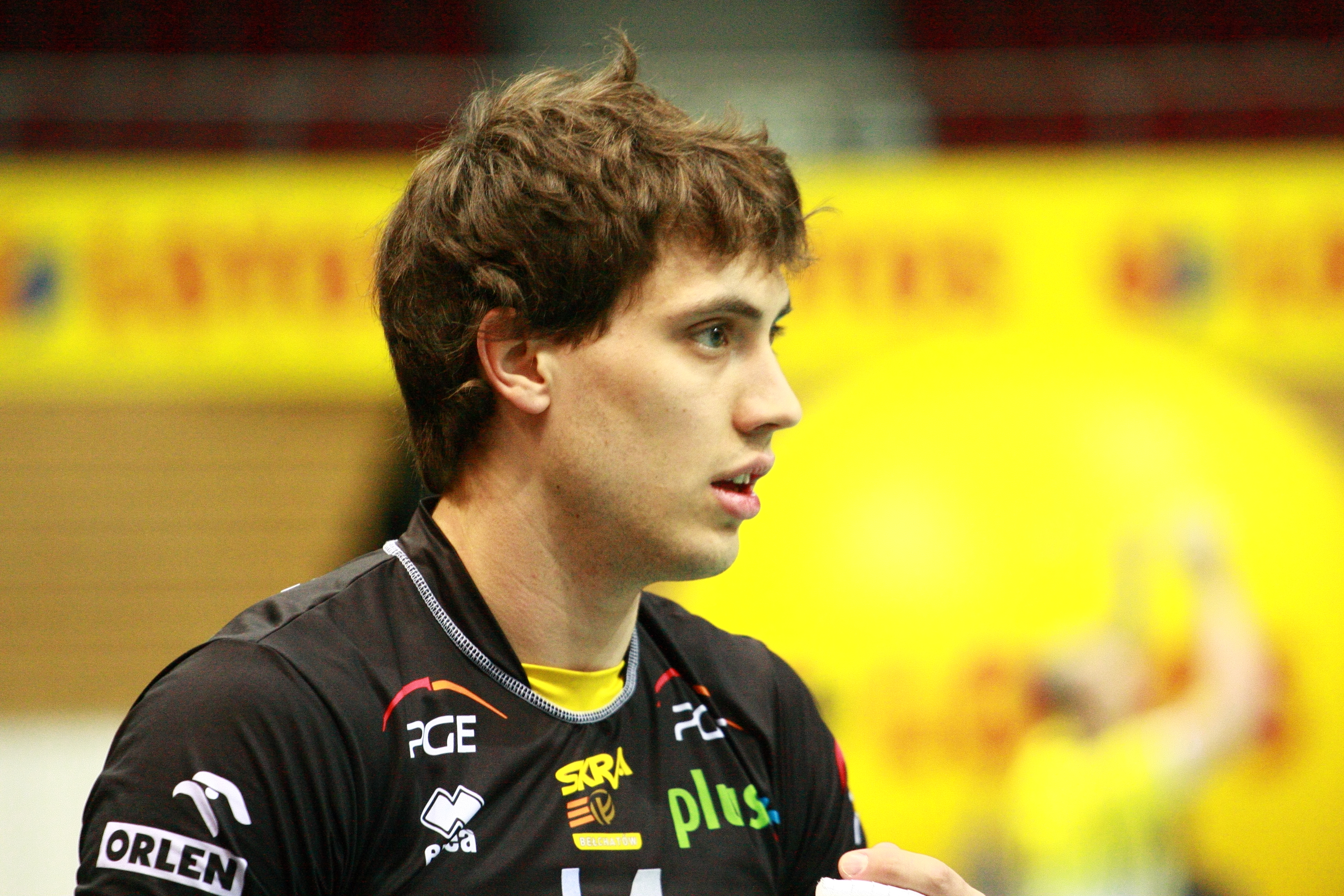
Opposite hitter - Aleksandar Atanasijević during the match against Lotos Trefl Gdańsk in PlusLiga on March 17, 2013.

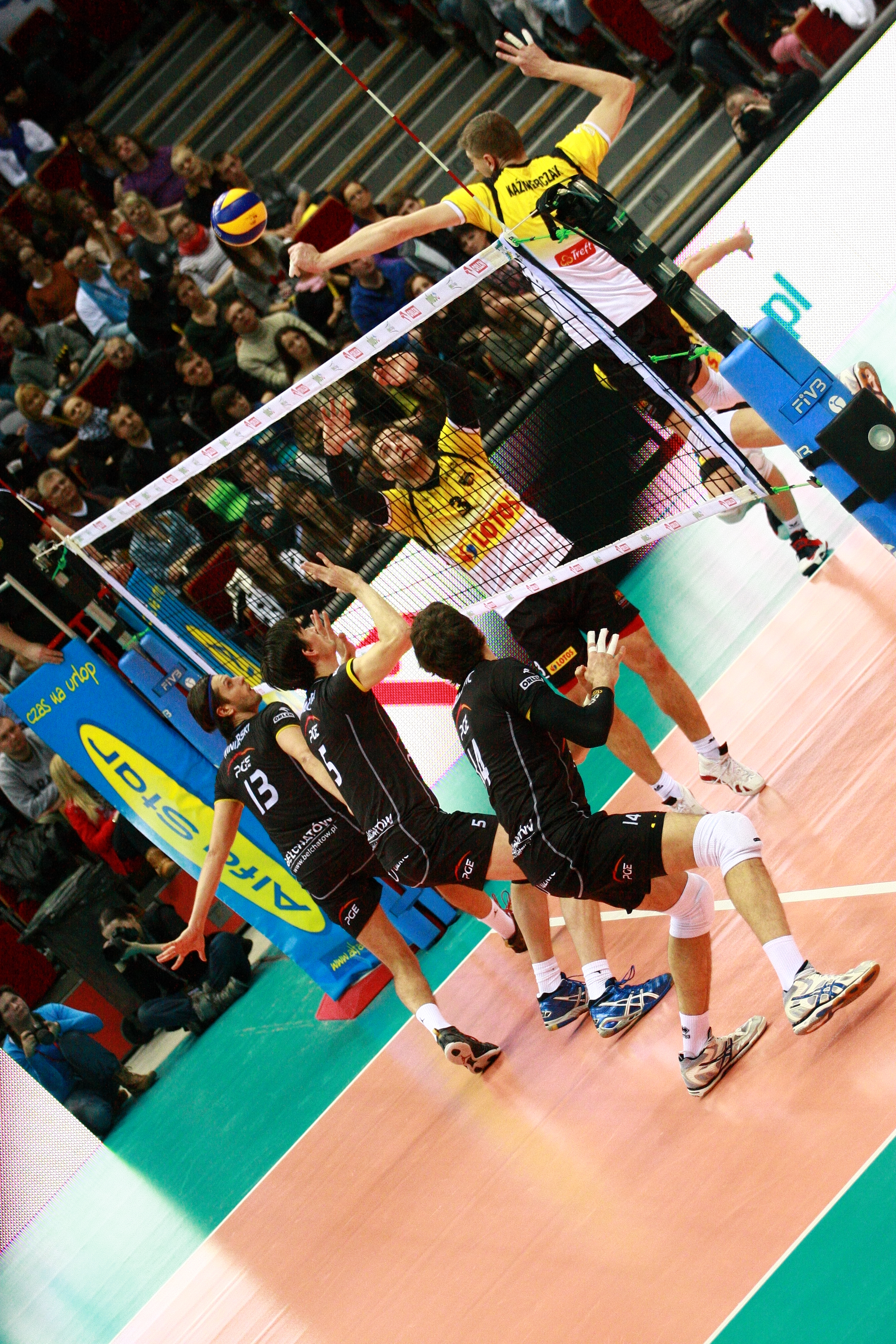
Lotos Trefl Gdańsk vs PGE Skra Bełchatów, in block from the left: Michał Winiarski (#13), Wytze Kooistra (#5), Aleksandar Atanasijević (#14).

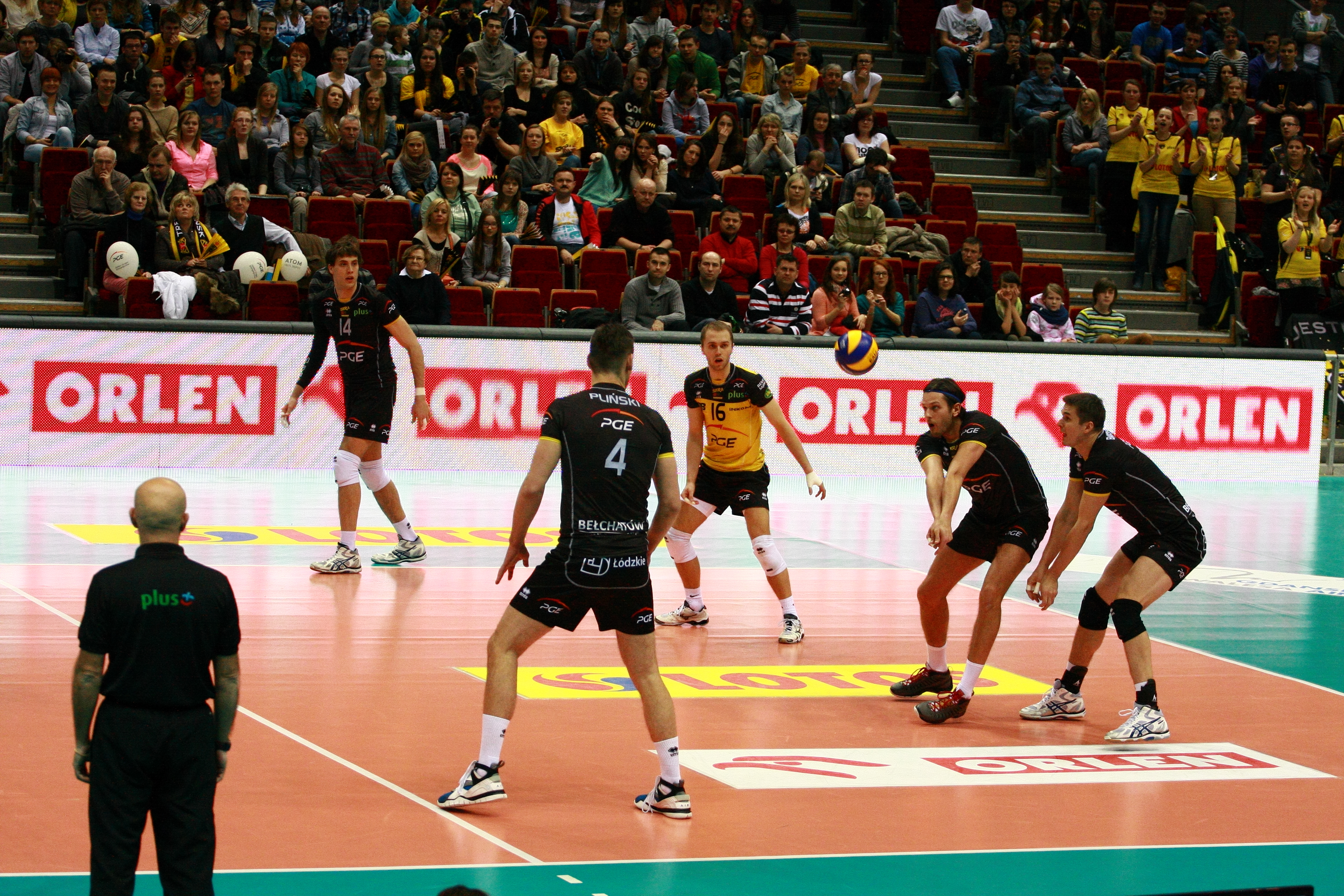
Reception the ball by Michał Winiarski (#13) and Michał Bąkiewicz (#18).

== Most Valuable Players ==
No.	Opponent	Date	Player
1.	Lotos Trefl Gdańsk	07.10.2012	(Poland) Michał Winiarski
2.	Transfer Bydgoszcz	10.11.2012	(Serbia) Aleksandar Atanasijević
3.	Indykpol AZS Olsztyn	15.11.2012	(Serbia) Aleksandar Atanasijević
4.	AZS Częstochowa	17.11.2012	(Poland) Paweł Woicki
5.	Effector Kielce	25.11.2012	(Poland) Daniel Pliński
6.	Lotos Trefl Gdańsk	01.12.2012	(Poland) Michał Winiarski
7.	Asseco Resovia Rzeszów	08.12.2012	(Serbia) Konstantin Čupković
8.	Indykpol AZS Olsztyn	14.12.2012	(Poland) Maciej Muzaj
9.	Effector Kielce	02.02.2013	(Netherlands) Wytze Kooistra
10.	AZS Politechnika Warszawska	09.02.2013	(Poland) Mariusz Wlazły
11.	Asseco Resovia Rzeszów	24.02.2013	(Serbia) Aleksandar Atanasijević
12.	Asseco Resovia Rzeszów	25.02.2013	(Serbia) Aleksandar Atanasijević
13.	Lotos Trefl Gdańsk	10.03.2013	(Netherlands) Wytze Kooistra
14.	Lotos Trefl Gdańsk	17.03.2013	(Serbia) Aleksandar Atanasijević
15.	AZS Politechnika Warszawska	22.03.2013	(Poland) Daniel Pliński
16.	AZS Politechnika Warszawska	23.03.2013	(Poland) Mariusz Wlazły
17.	AZS Politechnika Warszawska	08.04.2013	(Poland) Michał Winiarski

=== General classification ===
No.	Player	MVP
1.	(Serbia) Aleksandar Atanasijević	5
2.	(Poland) Michał Winiarski	3
3.	(Netherlands) Wytze Kooistra	2
	(Poland) Daniel Pliński	2
	(Poland) Mariusz Wlazły	2
6.	(Poland) Paweł Woicki	1
	(Serbia) Konstantin Čupković	1
	(Poland) Maciej Muzaj	1
