= Hoogendoorn =

Hoogendoorn is a Dutch surname. Notable people with the surname include:

- Esmir Hoogendoorn (born 1969), Dutch tennis player
- Michelle Davina Hoogendoorn (born 1995), Dutch singer
- Sjoerd Hoogendoorn (born 1991), Dutch volleyballer
