= Pluzhnikov =

Pluzhnikov (masculine, Russian: Плужников) or Pluzhnikova (feminine, Russian: Плужникова) is a Russian surname. Notable people with the surname include:

- Aleksey Pluzhnikov (born 1991), Russian volleyball player
- Konstantin Pluzhnikov (tenor) (born 1941), Russian operatic tenor
- Konstantin Pluzhnikov (gymnast) (born 1987), Russian gymnast
