= Aleksey Pluzhnikov =

Russian volleyball player (born 1991)

Personal information
- Nationality: Russian
- Born: 15 July 1991 (age 35)
- Height: 6 ft 9 in (2.05 m)
- Weight: 216 lb (98 kg)
- Spike: 140 in (350 cm)
- Block: 132 in (335 cm)

Volleyball information
- Position: Middle blocker
- Current club: (Russia) Gazprom-Ugra Surgut
- Number: 14

Career
Years	Teams
2009-2015; 2015-2018; 2018-2019; 2019-	(Russia) Yaroslavich Yaroslavl (Russia) Dinamo LO (Russia) Yaroslavich Yaroslavl (Russia) Gazprom-Ugra Surgut

Aleksey Vladimirovich Pluzhnikov (Russian: Алексей Владимирович Плужников; born 15 July 1991) is a Russian volleyball player and member of the club Gazprom-Ugra Surgut.

== Sporting achievements ==
=== National team ===
Junior European Championship:

- 2010

U21 World Championship:

- 2011

Universiade:

- 2017
