= Sergey Shlyapnikov =

Russian volleyball coach

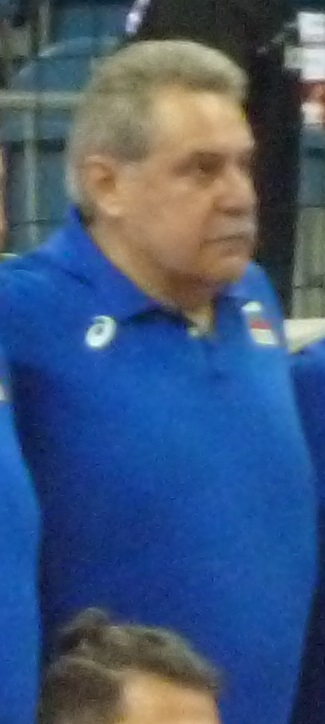
- Shlyapnikov in 2018

Personal information
- Nationality: Russian
- Born: 7 May 1961 (age 63); Yaroslavl, Russia
- Height: 1.91 m (6 ft 3 in)

Sergey Konstantinovich Shlyapnikov (Russian: Сергей Константинович Шляпников; born 7 May 1961) is a Russian volleyball coach who coached the Russia men's national volleyball team at the 2015 European Games in Baku where the team won a bronze medal.

Since 2017 he has been coaching the national men's team. Shlyapnikov is a Merited Master of Sports in Volleyball and Merited Coach of Russia.

== Coaching career ==
Shlyapnikov successfully coached the U19 men's national team, winning with them the 1999 U19 World Championships, as well as the 1999 and 2003 European Championships. For his success the International Olympic Committee awarded him the title "World's Best Boys' Coach".

He then coached the U21 men's junior team. Shlyapnikov helped the team to become 2011 U21 World Champions. He also coached the 2001 U21 World runners-up team. In U21 European Championships Shlyapnikov made his team winning in 2000, 2004, 2010 and 2014. At the 2013 Summer Universiade, he coached the future champion team. Then he also coached the national team at the 2015 European Games, winning bronze there. Since 2015 to 2016 he worked for Italian basketball team, Avellino but he returned in Russia after the won of European.

Shlyapnikov brought his team to the final of the 2017 Men's European Volleyball Championship, winning the championship title there.

== See also ==
- Russia at the 2015 European Games
