= Greece men's national under-21 volleyball team =

Greece U21
- Association: Hellenic Volleyball Federation
- Confederation: CEV

Uniforms
Home	Away	Third

FIVB U21 World Championship
- Appearances: 5 (First in 1987)
- Best result: 5th place : (1993)

Europe U21 / U20 Championship
- Appearances: Data uncompleted
- Official Website

The Greece men's national under-21 volleyball team represents Greece in international men's volleyball competitions and friendly matches under the age 21 and it is ruled by the Hellenic Volleyball Federation body that is an affiliate of the Federation of International Volleyball FIVB and also part of the European Volleyball Confederation CEV.

== Results ==
=== FIVB U21 World Championship ===
Champions Runners up Third place Fourth place

FIVB U21 World Championship
Year	Round	Position	Pld	W	L	SW	SL	Squad
(Brazil) 1977	Didn't qualify							
(United States) 1981	Didn't qualify							
(Italy) 1985	Didn't qualify							
(Bahrain) 1987		11th place						
(Greece) 1989		6th place						
(Egypt) 1991	Didn't qualify							
(Argentina) 1993		5th place						
(Malaysia) 1995	Didn't qualify							
(Bahrain) 1997	Didn't qualify							
(Thailand) 1999	Didn't qualify							
(Poland) 2001		13th place						
(Iran) 2003	Didn't qualify							
(India) 2005	Didn't qualify							
(Morocco) 2007	Didn't qualify							
(India) 2009		16th place						
(Brazil) 2011	Didn't qualify							
(Turkey) 2013	Didn't qualify							
(Mexico) 2015	Didn't qualify							
(Czech Republic) 2017	Didn't qualify							
(Bahrain) 2019	Didn't qualify							
(Italy) (Bulgaria) 2021	Didn't qualify							
(Bahrain) 2023	Didn't qualify							
(China) 2025	Didn't qualify							
Total	0 Titles	5/23						

== Team ==
=== Current squad ===
The following players are the Greek players that have competed in the 2018 Men's U20 Volleyball European Championship

#	name	position	height	weight	birthday	spike	block
	alexakis alexandros	middle-blocker	198	70	2000	313	283
	andreopoulos charalampos	outside-spiker	188	76	2001	311	287
	antonoglou ioannis	middle-blocker	193	80	2000	320	290
	barmpounis spyridon	outside-spiker	180	59	2000	315	284
	chakas spyridon	opposite	187	66	2002	317	312
	chandrinos spyridon	outside-spiker	186	71	2001	312	307
	chatzinikolaou dimitrios	outside-spiker	190	82	1999	315	292
	dimo ilia	outside-spiker	204	90	2001	315	288
	dimoudis konstantinos	middle-blocker	193	75	2000	328	303
	georgiou evangelos	setter	185	78	1999	330	294
	kagialis michail	middle-blocker	195	72	2000	329	303
	kanasaros angelos	outside-spiker	188	76	2000	311	287
	kapetanidis konstantinos	outside-spiker	195	85	1999	329	303
	kechagias alexandros	libero	179	70	2000	310	283
	kotsakis froixos	outside-spiker	190	81	1999	333	303
	ma?ganas petros	outside-spiker	188	78	2000	310	294
	makrygiannis konstantinos	opposite	193	81	1999	327	294
	melingiotis evangelos	setter	188	83	1999	310	285
	mouchlias dimitrios	opposite	198	70	2001	313	283
	palaiologos dimitrios	outside-spiker	190	82	2000	315	292
	papalexiou georgios	middle-blocker	205	82	1999	292	282
	raptis alexandros	opposite	190	78	2000	327	295
	rousopoulos theofanis	setter	182	72	2000	311	284
	stefanidis michail angelos	setter	179	80	2000	306	277
	stratos apostolos	outside-spiker	187	66	2002	317	312
	synadinos sotirios	libero	178	71	2000	311	284
	tziavras dimitrios	libero	176	72	1999	311	284
	vasilakopoulos nikolaos	middle-blocker	193	75	1999	327	303
	zaimis petros	middle-blocker	196	76	1999	329	303
