= Sjoerd Hoogendoorn =

Dutch volleyball player (born 1991)

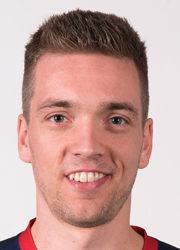

Personal information
- Full name: Sjoerd Hoogendoorn
- Nationality: Dutch
- Born: February 17, 1991 (age 35); Nieuwegein, Netherlands
- Height: 2.00 m (6 ft 7 in)
- Weight: 91 kg (201 lb)
- Spike: 354 cm (139 in)
- Block: 335 cm (132 in)

Volleyball information
- Position: Opposite
- Current club: (Italy) Sir Safety Umbria Volley
- Number: 4

Career
Years	Teams
2009–2013; 2013–2015; 2015–2016; 2016–2018; 2018-2020	(Netherlands) Dynamo Apeldoorn (Finland) Vammalan Lentopallo (Italy) Argos Sora (Italy) Olimpia Pallavolo (Italy) Sir Safety Umbria Volley

National team
Netherlands
- Last updated: 16 March 2019

Sjoerd Hoogendoorn (February 17, 1991 Nieuwegein) is a Dutch volleyballplayer, currently playing for Italian Sir Safety Umbria Volley and a Netherlands men's national volleyball team member.

== Career ==
Hoogendoorn played for the Dutch club Dynamo Apeldoorn between 2009 and 2013. During this period he won the National Championship, the SuperCup and twice the National Cup.

In 2013 Hoogendoorn continued his career in Finland at Vammalan Lentopallo who are acting in the Finland Volleyball League. He won the Finnish Championship and was twice runner up champion of the National Cup.

During the 2015/2016 season Hoogendoorn played for the Italian team Globo Banca del Popolare Frusinate Sora, or Argos Volley. In February 2016 Sora lost the Cup final in the Mediolanum Forum in Milan with 3-2 from Vibo Valentia. Sora managed to win the A2 championship against the same opponent with 3–2 in the best-of-5 play-off series, after trailing 0–2. The last game on 15–05–2016, played in Vibo Valentia, was won by Sora with 3–1. This earned promotion to the Superlega, the Serie A1, for Sora, for the first time in their history.

During the seasons 2016/2017 and 2017/2018 Hoogendoorn played for the Italian team Olimpia Pallovolo in the Serie A2 Championship. During season 2017/2018 Hoogendoorn was captain of the team.

Currently Hoogendoorn plays for the Italian Serie A1 team Sir Safety Umbria Volley who won the Italian Championship, the Italian Cup and the Italian SuperCup in season 2017–2018. This season Sir Safety Umbria Volley won the Italian Cup of the Serie A1 in February 2018 at the Unipol Arena in Bologna.

== National team ==
Hoogendoorn is a member of the Netherlands men's national volleyball team since 2011. In 2010 he was captain of the Junior National team and he became 'Best Scorer' at the Junior European Championship in Babruisk, Belarus.

== Sporting achievements ==
- 2009/2010 Dutch Cup, with Dynamo Apeldoorn
- 2009/2010 Dutch Championship, with Dynamo Apeldoorn
- 2010/2011 Dutch SuperCup, with Dynamo Apeldoorn
- 2010/2011 Dutch Cup, with Dynamo Apeldoorn
- 2013/2014 Finnish Championship, with Vammalan Lentopallo
- 2015/2016 Italian Championship Serie A2, with Argos Sora
- 2018/2019 Italian Cup, Serie A1, with Sir Safety Umbria Volley
- 2019/2020 Italian Supercup, Serie A1, with Sir Safety Umbria Volley

National team - Golden League 2019 3rd place

=== Individually ===
- 2010 CEV U21 European Championship – Best Scorer
- 2016/2017 Best Scorer A2 744 points
- 2019/2020 Best player of Sir Safety Perugia 2019/2020, voted by fans
