= Wytze Kooistra =

Dutch volleyball player (born 1982)

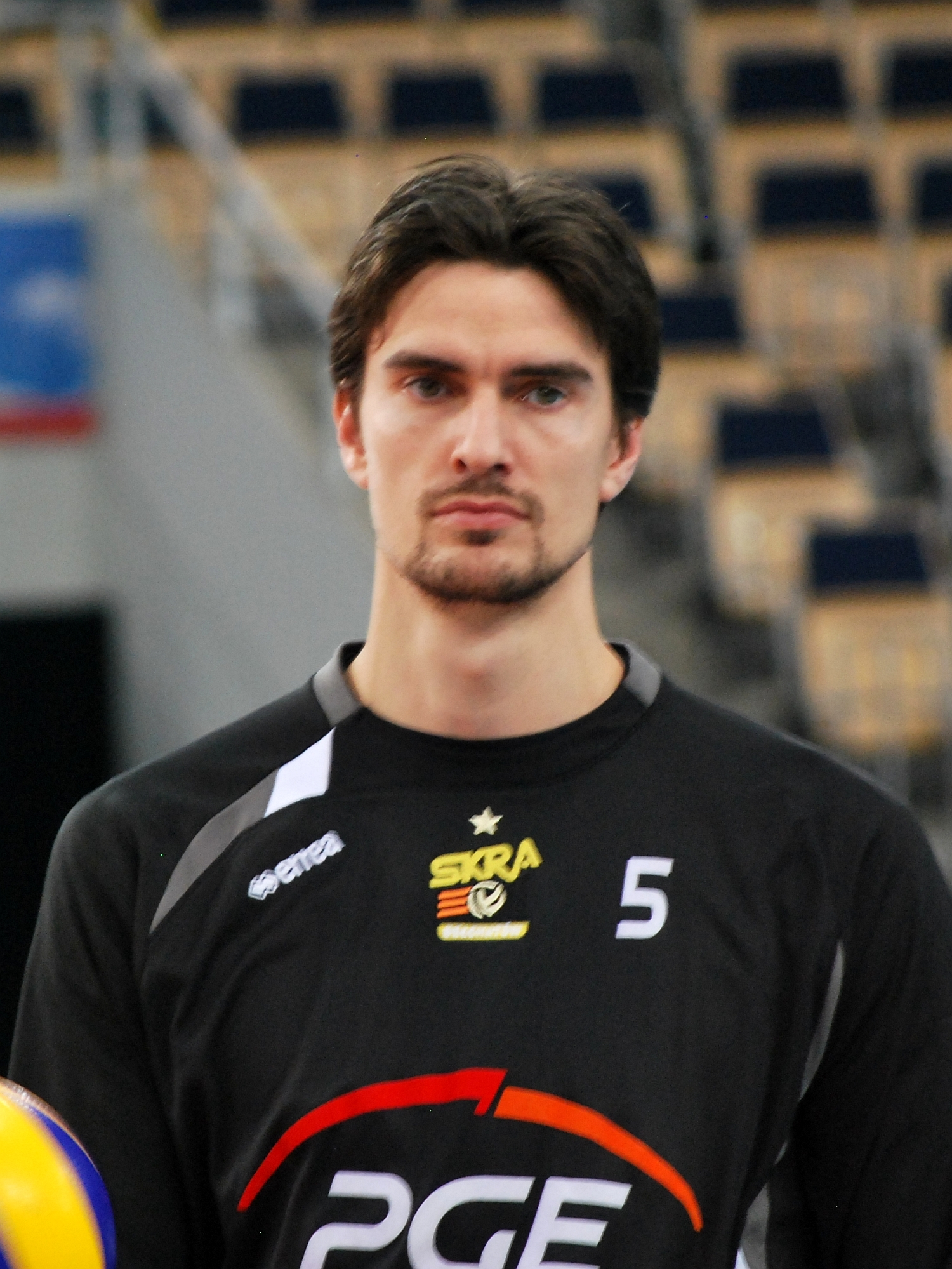

Personal information
- Full name: Wytze Kooistra
- Nationality: Dutch
- Born: June 3, 1982 (age 44) Westerbork, Netherlands
- Height: 2.09 m (6 ft 10 in)
- Weight: 102 kg (225 lb)
- Spike: 360 cm (140 in)
- Block: 345 cm (136 in)

Volleyball information
- Position: Middle blocker/Opposite
- Current club: Abiant Lycurgus Groningen
- Number: 2 (club), 12 (national team)

Career
- Years: Team
- 2000–2002 2002–2005 2005–2006 2006–2008 2008–2011 2011–2013 2013–2014 2014 2015 2015 2015–: Abiant Lycurgus Groningen; Sportvereniging Dynamo; Itas Diatec Trentino; M. Roma Volley; Trenkwalder Modena; PGE Skra Bełchatów; Cerrad Czarni Radom; İstanbul Büyükşehir Belediyesi; Pallavolo Molfetta; Olympiacos Piraeus; Abiant Lycurgus Groningen

National team
- Years: Team
- 2005–: Netherlands
Honours
Men's volleyball
Representing Netherlands
European League
Gold medal – first place	2006 Turkey
Gold medal – first place	2012 Turkey
Bronze medal – third place	2004 Czech Republic
- Updated on 20 February 2017

Wytze Kooistra (born 3 June 1982) is a Dutch volleyball player, a member of Netherlands men's national volleyball team and Dutch club Abiant Lycurgus Groningen.

== Career ==
He began his career as a middle-blocker. In 2013, he played for his national team as a spiker, and now he is playing in this position at his club.

=== Clubs ===
His first professional club was Lycurgus. During the seasons 2002-2005, he played for Piet Zoomers. In 2005, he moved to Itas Diatec Trentino. In 2011, he moved to Polish PlusLiga team, PGE Skra Bełchatów. For a long time he was a reserve player. With the club from Bełchatów, Kooistra won the Polish Cup of 2012, a silver medal in the Polish Championship in the season 2011/2012 and in the Polish SuperCup of 2013. He is a silver medalist of the CEV Champions League, which was held in Łódź, Poland. In 2013 moved to another Polish PlusLiga club - Cerrad Czarni Radom.

== Sporting achievements ==
=== Clubs ===
==== CEV Champions League ====
- 2011/2012 - with PGE Skra Bełchatów

==== CEV Cup ====
- 2007/2008, with M. Roma Volley

==== FIVB Club World Championship ====
- Qatar 2012 - with PGE Skra Bełchatów

==== National championships ====
- 2011/2012 Polish Championship, with PGE Skra Bełchatów
- 2011/2012 Polish Cup, with PGE Skra Bełchatów
- 2012/2013 Polish SuperCup, with PGE Skra Bełchatów
- 2014/2015 Greek League Cup, with Olympiacos Piraeus

=== Individually ===
- 2005 Dutch Championship - Best Blocker
