= Austria men's national under-21 volleyball team =

Youth volleyball team representing Austria

Austria U21
- Association: Austrian Volleyball Federation
- Confederation: CEV

Uniforms
Home	Away	Third

FIVB U21 World Championship
- Appearances: No Appearances

Europe U21 / U20 Championship
- Appearances: Data uncompleted
- Austrian Volleyball Association (in German)

The Austria men's national under-21 volleyball team represents Austria in international men's volleyball competitions and friendly matches under the age 21 and it is ruled by the Austrian Volleyball Federation body that is an affiliate of the Federation of International Volleyball FIVB and also part of the European Volleyball Confederation CEV.

== Results ==
=== FIVB U21 World Championship ===
Champions Runners up Third place Fourth place

FIVB U21 World Championship
Year	Round	Position	Pld	W	L	SW	SL	Squad
(Brazil) 1977 To | (Italy) (Bulgaria) 2021	Didn't qualify							
Total	0 Titles	0/20						

=== European U21 / 20 Championship ===
Champions Runners-up Third place 4th place

European U21 / 20 Championship Qualifying Tournament
Year	Round	Position	Pld	W	L	SW	SL	Squad
2014 Q	Group stages	Third place						
2016 Q	Group Stages	4th place						
2018 Q	Group stages	4th place						
2020 Q	Group Stages	4th Place						
2022 Q	On Hold							
Total	0 Titles	0/27						

== Team ==
=== Current squad ===
The following players are the Austrian players that have competed in the 2018 Men's U20 Volleyball European Championship

#	name	position	height	weight	birthday	spike	block
	Bauer alexander	middle-blocker	200	85	1999	336	322
	Etlinger niklas	outside-spiker	188	73	1999	330	312
	Hahn christopher	setter	197	91	1999	338	321
	Hofbauer julian	libero	179	74	1999	321	309
	Kopschar arwin	outside-spiker	185	79	1999	330	315
	Kremer mark maximilian	opposite	190	84	1999	334	320
	Kühl lukas	middle-blocker	203	85	1999	332	324
	Langwieser stephan	libero	188	76	1999	322	301
	Leitner laurenz	outside-spiker	190	80	2000	332	320
	Nikolic boris	outside-spiker	195	92	1999	338	325
	Pascariuc paul	setter	192	76	1999	338	320
	Petschnig david marius	middle-blocker	191	84	1999	327	313
	Preinfalk felix	opposite	191	96	1999	330	314
	Schedl maximilian	opposite	202	90	2001	339	320
	Steinböck maximilian	middle-blocker	194	79	1999	333	324
	Zaller jan niklas	setter	189	80	1999	312	298
