= Aleksandar Atanasijević =

Serbian volleyball player (born 1991)

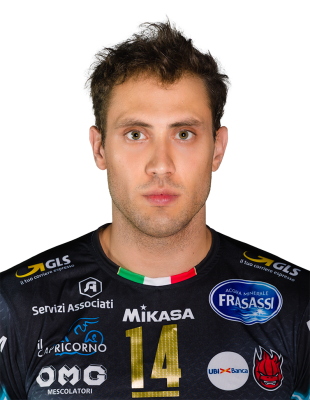
- Atanasijević in 2020

Personal information
- Nickname: Aleks, Magnum, Bata
- Born: 4 September 1991 (age 35); Belgrade, SR Serbia, SFR Yugoslavia
- Height: 2.02 m (6 ft 8 in)
- Weight: 99 kg (218 lb)
- Spike: 360 cm (142 in)
- Block: 338 cm (133 in)

Volleyball information
- Position: Opposite
- Current club: Olympiacos SF Piraeus

Career
Years	Teams
2007–2011	(Serbia) OK Partizan
2011–2013	(Poland) Skra Bełchatów
2013–2021	(Italy) Sir Safety Perugia
2021–2023	(Poland) Skra Bełchatów
2023–2024	(China) Shanghai Bright
2024–2026	(Greece) Olympiacos Piraeus
2026-	Panionios

National team
2011–2024	Serbia
Honours
Men's volleyball
Representing Serbia
FIVB World League
Silver medal – second place	2015 Rio de Janeiro
CEV European Championship
Gold medal – first place	2011 Austria/Czech Republic
Gold medal – first place	2019 Belgium/France/Netherlands/Slovenia
Bronze medal – third place	2013 Denmark/Poland
Bronze medal – third place	2017 Poland
- Last updated: 7 April 2026

Aleksandar Atanasijević (Serbian Cyrillic: Александар Атанасијевић; born 4 September 1991) is a Serbian professional volleyball player who plays as an opposite spiker for Olympiacos. Atanasijević took part in 2 Olympic Games (London 2012, Paris 2024) and is a two–time European Champion (2011, 2019) with Serbia.

== Personal life ==
He is married with Bulgarian professional volleyball player Elitsa Vasileva-Atanasijević who plays as an outside hitter for Panionios in Greece.

== Career ==
=== Club ===
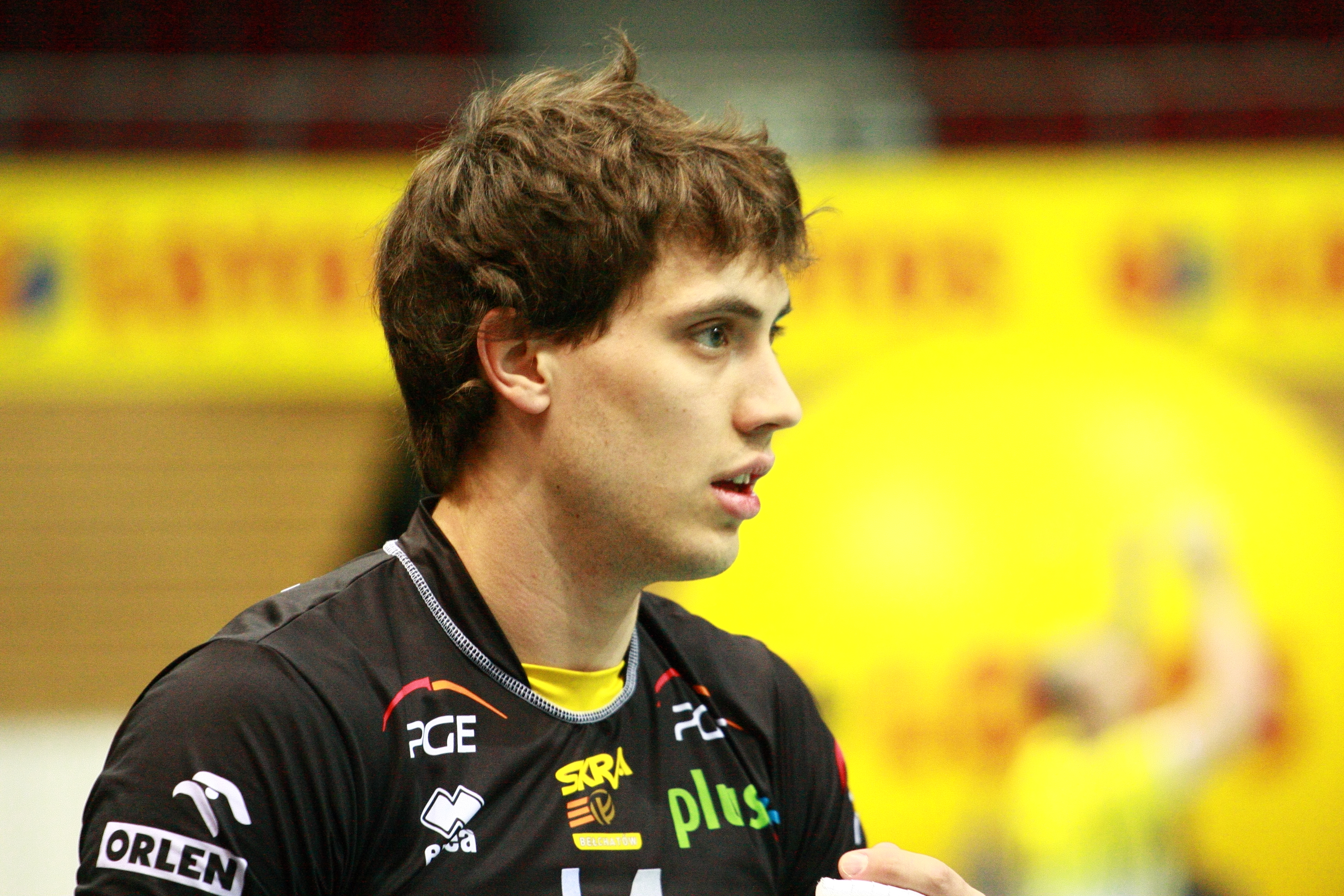
During the match PGE Skra Bełchatów against Lotos Trefl Gdańsk at Ergo Arena.

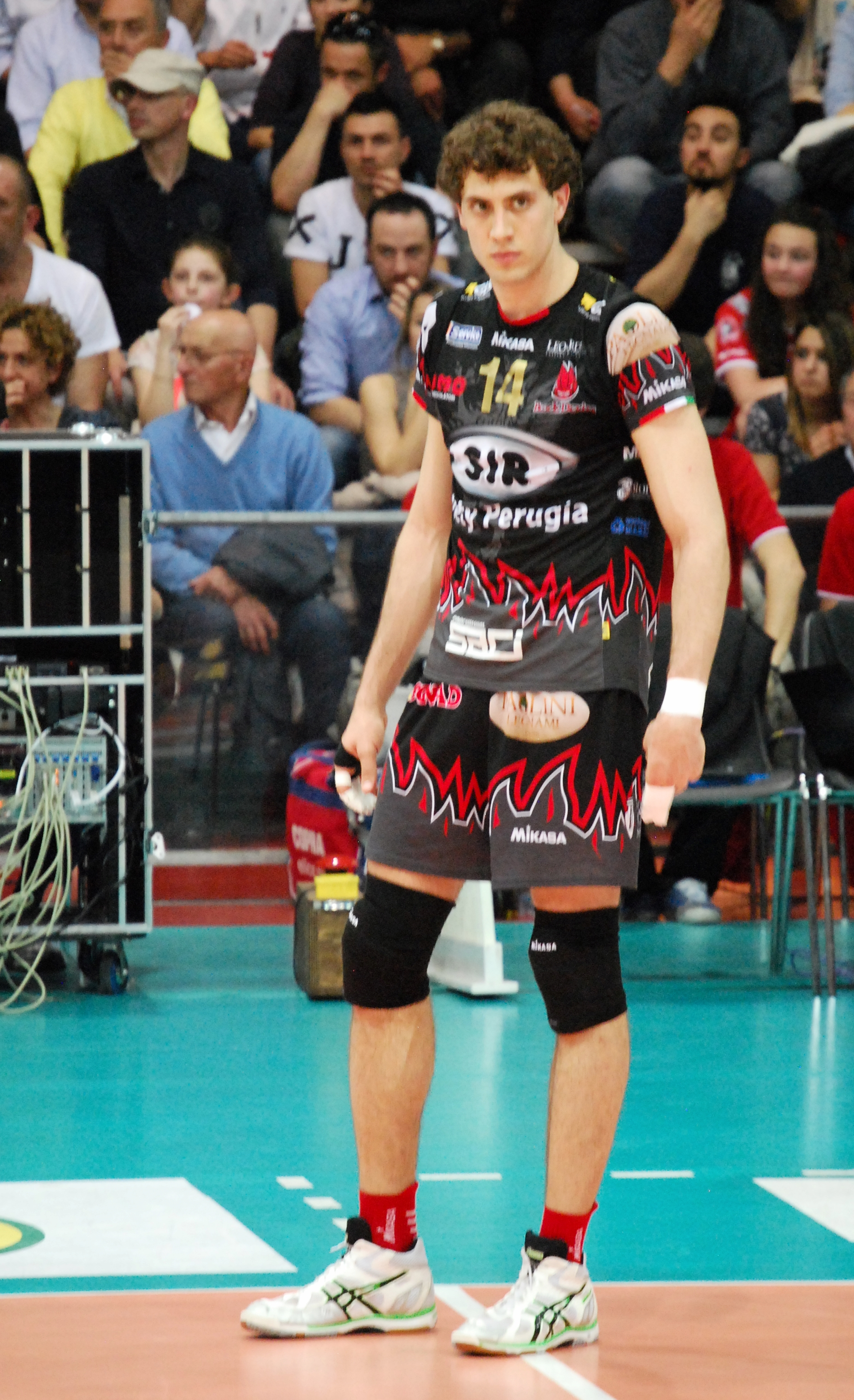
As Sir Safety Perugia player in the 2013–14 season.

His first professional club was Serbian OK Partizan. His trainer was Slavko Balandžić. In 2011, he moved to PGE Skra Bełchatów, one of the most successful teams in the Polish PlusLiga. In his first season in Poland, he was mainly a substitute player for Mariusz Wlazły. In the second season, he has become a major player on his position repeatedly winning the statuette for best player of the match. With PGE Skra Belchatów, he won a silver medal of the Polish Championship, Polish Cup, and a silver medal of the Club World Championship. In 2012, Atanasijević won a silver medal of the CEV Champions League after the match against Zenit Kazan during the Final Four held in Łódź, Poland. In 2013, he moved to Italian club – Sir Safety Perugia. In 2014, he won a silver medal of the Italian Championship after losing matches against Lube. In May 2014, he signed a new three–year contract with Sir Safety Perugia. With the Italian team he won several titles, such as the Italian championship in 2018, the Italian Cup in 2018 and 2019, as well as the Italian Super Cup in 2018, 2020 and 2021. He was also runner-up in the 2017 CEV Champions League.
He then won the Chinese Championship in 2024 with Shanghai Bright, and in the same year he signed a contract with the Greek team Olympiacos. With the Piraeus team in the 2024-25 season he won three cups, the League Cup, the Super Cup and the Hellenic Cup. He was also runner-up in the Hellenic Championship in the same season.

=== National team ===
He is a gold medalist of 2011 European Championship, and bronze medalist of the 2013 European Championship. He was a member of the national team at the Olympic Games London 2012. On 19 July 2015, the Serbian national team with him in squad reached the final of the 2015 World League, but lost to France (0–3), and eventually achieved a silver medal. Atanasijević received an individual award for the Best Opposite Spiker of the tournament.

== Honours ==
=== Club ===
- CEV Champions League
  - 2011–12, with PGE Skra Bełchatów
  - 2016–17, with Sir Safety Conad Perugia
  - 2017–18, with Sir Safety Conad Perugia
- Club World Championship
  - 2012, with PGE Skra Bełchatów
- National championships
  - 2010–11 Serbian Championship, with OK Partizan
  - 2011–12 Polish Championship, with Skra Bełchatów
  - 2015–16 Italian Championship, with Sir Safety Conad Perugia
  - 2017–18 Italian Championship, with Sir Safety Conad Perugia
  - 2018–19 Italian Championship, with Sir Safety Conad Perugia
  - 2020–21 Italian Championship, Sir Safety Conad Perugia
  - 2023–24 Chinese Championship, with Shanghai Bright
  - 2024–25 Hellenic championship, with Olympiacos Piraeus
- National cups
  - 2010–11 Serbian Cup, with OK Partizan
  - 2011–12 Polish Cup, with Skra Bełchatów
  - 2012–13 Polish Super Cup, with Skra Bełchatów
  - 2013–14 Italian Cup, with Sir Safety Conad Perugia
  - 2017–18 Italian Super Cup, with Sir Safety Conad Perugia
  - 2017–18 Italian Cup, with Sir Safety Conad Perugia
  - 2018–19 Italian Cup, with Sir Safety Conad Perugia
  - 2019–20 Italian Cup, with Sir Safety Conad Perugia
  - 2019–20 Italian Super Cup, with Sir Safety Conad Perugia
  - 2020–21 Italian Super Cup, with Sir Safety Conad Perugia
  - 2020–21 Italian Cup, with Sir Safety Conad Perugia
  - 2024–25 Hellenic League Cup, with Olympiacos Piraeus
  - 2024 Hellenic Super Cup, with Olympiacos Piraeus
  - 2024–25 Hellenic Cup, with Olympiacos Piraeus
  - 2025–26 Hellenic League Cup, with Olympiacos Piraeus
  - 2025 Hellenic Super Cup, with Olympiacos Piraeus

=== Youth national team ===
- 2009 CEV U18 European Championship
- 2009 FIVB U19 World Championship
- 2010 CEV U20 European Championship
- 2011 FIVB U21 World Championship
- 2013 FIVB U23 World Championship

=== National team ===
- 2011 CEV European Championship
- 2013 CEV European Championship
- 2015 FIVB World League
- 2017 CEV European Championship
- 2019 CEV European Championship

=== Individual awards ===
- 2009: CEV U19 European Championship – Best opposite spiker
- 2009: FIVB U19 World Championship – Most valuable player
- 2010: CEV U20 European Championship – Best spiker
- 2011: FIVB U21 World Championship – Best scorer
- 2012: FIVB Club World Championship – Best scorer
- 2013: CEV European Championship – Best scorer
- 2013: FIVB U23 World Championship – Best opposite spiker
- 2014: Italian Championship – Best scorer
- 2014: Italian Championship – Best spiker
- 2015: Italian Championship – Best scorer
- 2015: Italian Championship – Best spiker
- 2015: FIVB World League – Best opposite spiker
- 2016: Italian Championship – Best scorer
- 2016: Italian Championship – Best spiker
- 2017: CEV Champions League – Best opposite spiker
- 2018: Italian Cup – Most valuable player
- 2018: Italian Championship – Most valuable player
- 2018: CEV Champions League – Best server
- 2018: CEV Champions League – Best scorer
- 2019: CEV Champions League – Best spiker
- 2019: CEV Champions League – Best scorer
- 2019: CEV European Championship – Best opposite spiker
- 2019: Italian Cup – Best scorer
- 2024: Chinese Championship – Best opposite spiker
- 2025: Hellenic League Cup – Most valuable player
