= Denmark men's national under-21 volleyball team =

Volleyball team

Denmark U21
- Association: Danish Volleyball Federation
- Confederation: CEV

Uniforms
Home	Away	Third

FIVB U21 World Championship
- Appearances: No Appearances

Europe U21 / U20 Championship
- Appearances: Data uncompleted

The Denmark men's national under-21 volleyball team represents Denmark in international men's volleyball competitions and friendly matches under the age 21 and it is ruled by the Danish Volleyball Federation body that is an affiliate of the Federation of International Volleyball FIVB and also part of the European Volleyball Confederation CEV.

== Results ==
=== FIVB U21 World Championship ===
Champions Runners up Third place Fourth place

FIVB U21 World Championship
Year	Round	Position	Pld	W	L	SW	SL	Squad
(Brazil) 1977 To | (China) 2025	Did not qualify							
Total	0 Titles	0/23						

=== European U21 / 20 Championship ===
Champions Runners-up Third place 4th place

European U21 / 20 Championship Qualifying Tournament
Year	Round	Position	Pld	W	L	SW	SL	Squad
2014	Group stages	4th place						
2016	second round	Third place						
2018	Group stages	Third place						
2020								
Total	0 Titles	0/27						

== Team ==
=== Previous squad ===
The Following Players Represents Denmark in the 2022 European Junior Championship Qualifications

#	name	position	height	weight	birthday	spike	block
1	CHRISTENSEN Benjamin Nielsen	Libero	186	75	2003	312	238
2	CORNELIUS Gustav Plesner	Setter	191	75	2003	321	241
3	HANSEN Marius Stenmann	Outside spiker	196	90	2004	339	252
6	JEPPESEN Anton Dixen	Setter	188	72	2004	330	238
7	PEDERSEN Emil Blankholm	Opposite	203	98	2003	347	252
9	FRIMURER Victor Kjær	Outside spiker	189	80	2003	342	242
10	JENSEN Magnus Brandi	Outside spiker	195	82	2003	339	252
11	ANDERSEN Christian Lundby	Middle blocker	195	82	2004	347	252
12	UHRENHOLT Simon Tabermann	Opposite	204	86	2004	360	267
13	LARSEN Axel Valdemar Juul	Outside spiker	194	78	2004	330	251
14	MIKKELSEN Oskar Berg	Middle blocker	217	85	2004	330	280
15	PONTOPPIDAN Oskar Riis	Middle blocker	200	63	2003	338	253
16	CHRISTENSEN Oliver Rydahl	Middle blocker	197	92	2003	332	256
17	KROGH Jonathan Stenholt	Setter	193	70	2004	328	246
18	BERNBERG Emil	Libero	188	67	2004	305	238
19	KIRK Laurits Heinesen	Middle blocker	201	73	2003	342	262
21	HUNTLEY Joshua	Outside spiker	193	78	2004	333	245
22	DUMBUYAH Sebastian Hybschmann	Middle blocker	197	91	2003	350	262
23	BARDENFLETH-HANSEN LØJBORG Aske	Libero	184	66	2003	315	235
25	WELLENDORF Victor Dalgas	Outside spiker	195	70	2003	334	247
