= Spain men's national under-21 volleyball team =

Under-21 volleyball team

Spain U21
- Association: Spanish Volleyball Federation
- Confederation: CEV

Uniforms
Home	Away	Third

FIVB U21 World Championship
- Appearances: 6 (First in 1977)
- Best result: 7th place : (1995, 2011)

CEV Europe U20 Championship
- Appearances: Data Incompleted
- www.rfevb.com (in Spanish)

The Spain men's national under-21 volleyball team represents Spain in international men's volleyball competitions and friendly matches under the age 21 and it is ruled by the Real Federación Española de Voleibol body that is an affiliate of the Federation of International Volleyball FIVB and also part of the European Volleyball Confederation CEV.

== Results ==
=== FIVB U21 World Championship ===
Champions Runners up Third place Fourth place

FIVB U21 World Championship
Year	Round	Position	Pld	W	L	SW	SL	Squad
(Brazil) 1977		11th place						Squad
(United States) 1981		10th place						Squad
(Italy) 1985	Didn't qualify							
(Bahrain) 1987	Didn't qualify							
(Greece) 1989		13th place						Squad
(Egypt) 1991	Didn't qualify							
(Argentina) 1993		13th place						Squad
(Malaysia) 1995		7th place						Squad
(Bahrain) 1997	Didn't qualify							
(Thailand) 1999	Didn't qualify							
(Poland) 2001	Didn't qualify							
(Iran) 2003	Didn't qualify							
(India) 2005	Didn't qualify							
(Morocco) 2007	Didn't qualify							
(India) 2009	Didn't qualify							
(Brazil) 2011		7th place						Squad
(Turkey) 2013	Didn't qualify							
(Mexico) 2015	Didn't qualify							
(Czech Republic) 2017	Didn't qualify							
(Bahrain) 2019	Didn't qualify							
(Italy) (Bulgaria) 2021	Didn't qualify							
(Bahrain) 2023	Didn't qualify							
(China) 2025	Didn't qualify							
Total	0 Titles	6/23						

== Team ==
=== Previous squad ===
#	Name	Position	Height	Weight	Birthday	Spike	Block
1	NIEVES SUAREZ Carlos	Outside spiker	199	75	2004	315	258
2	RIBAS BROCKERT Alejandro	Middle blocker	194	83	2004	318	224
3	RUDA MARTINEZ Florentino	Middle blocker	193	69	2003	315	252
4	DELOS TORRENT Pau	Middle blocker	195	68	2004	311	251
5	ARJONES FERREIROS Jaime	Setter	184	67	2003	308	242
6	ZABALA SAIZ Gabriel	Outside spiker	188	80	2003	317	245
8	LOSADA GORDALIZA Roi	Setter	187	67	2003	300	242
9	SALMERÓN SAIZ Guillermo	Opposite	194	78	2003	310	256
10	FERNANDO QUINTANILLA Martin	Middle blocker	194	81	2003	310	251
11	ALVARO ORTEGA Iker	Outside spiker	191	66	2003	310	250
12	CARALT CARREÑO Marcel	Libero	174	68	2004	280	228
13	CID CADENAS Mario	Outside spiker	196	89	2003	310	250
14	BELDA DE VIAL Luke	Outside spiker	192	78	2003	315	257
15	MIMOUN CHAKRANI Azzdin	Middle blocker	194	82	2004	330	244
16	FRESQUET BARCELO Xavier	Middle blocker	197	84	2003	315	254
17	CASAIS BLANCO Martin	Outside spiker	193	76	2005	340	257
18	DAVILA TORRADO Alan	Libero	183	73	2003	290	232
19	BRITO CABRERA Jhonnatan Isaac	Outside spiker	188	68	2003	300	240
20	PARADELA CORTON Miguel	Libero	185	77	2004	310	235
21	AÑA MARTINEZ Victor	Setter	185	68	2005	299	235
22	GONZALO DIAZ Luis Carlos	Opposite	196	96	2005	324	258
23	MONTESDEOCA SANTANA Elio	Opposite	196	81	2005	305	243
24	MORENO SANCHEZ Pau	Opposite	191	76	2005	318	250
