= Igor Filippov (volleyball) =

Russian volleyball player (born 1991)

Personal information
- Full name: Igor Vladimirovich Filippov
- Nationality: Russian
- Born: 19 March 1991 (age 35); USSR
- Height: 2.05 m (6 ft 9 in)
- Weight: 107 kg (236 lb)
- Spike: 340 cm (134 in)
- Block: 326 cm (128 in)

Volleyball information
- Position: Middle blocker
- Current club: Belogorie

Career
Years	Teams
2009–2013; 2013–2017; 2017–2019; 2019–2021; 2021–	Yaroslavich Yaroslavl; Dinamo Moscow; Ural Ufa; Zenit Saint Petersburg; Belogorie

National team
2018–2019	Russia
Honours
Men's volleyball
Representing Russia
Nations League
Gold medal – first place	2018 Lille
European Games
Bronze medal – third place	2015 Baku
- Last updated: 24 May 2021

Igor Vladimirovich Filippov (Russian: Игорь Владимирович Филиппов; born 19 March 1991) is a Russian male volleyball player. He is part of the Russia men's national volleyball team. He won the bronze medal at the 2015 European Games in Baku. On club level he plays for Belogorie.

== See also ==
- Russia at the 2015 European Games
