= 2011 FIVB Volleyball Men's U21 World Championship =

2011 Men's Junior World Championship
Tournament details
- Host country: Brazil
- Dates: 1–10 August
- Teams: 16
- Venues: 2 (in 2 host cities)

Final positions
- Champions: Russia (8th title)

Tournament awards
- MVP: (Russia) Leonid Shchadilov

The 2011 FIVB Volleyball Men's Junior World Championship was held in Rio de Janeiro and Niterói, Brazil from 1 to 10 August 2011.

== Pools composition ==
Pool A	Pool B	Pool C	Pool D
Brazil; United States; Bulgaria; Japan	Argentina; Tunisia; Spain; Puerto Rico	Russia; India; Germany; Egypt	Iran; Serbia; Belgium; Canada

== Venues ==
- Ginásio do Maracanãzinho, Rio de Janeiro, Brazil – Pool A, C, E, F, 5th–8th places and Final four
- Ginásio Caio Martins, Niterói, Brazil – Pool B, D, G, H, 13th–16th places and 9th–12th places

== Pool standing procedure ==
1. Match points
2. Number of matches won
3. Sets ratio
4. Points ratio
5. Result of the last match between the tied teams

Match won 3–0 or 3–1: 3 match points for the winner, 0 match points for the loser
Match won 3–2: 2 match points for the winner, 1 match point for the loser

== First round ==
- All times are Brasília Time (UTC−03:00).

=== Pool A ===
Pos	Team	Pld	W	L	Pts	SW	SL	SR	SPW	SPL	SPR	Qualification
1	United States	3	2	1	6	7	4	1.750	257	239	1.075	Pool E or Pool F
2	Brazil	3	2	1	6	8	6	1.333	312	297	1.051	Pool E or Pool F
3	Japan	3	2	1	4	7	7	1.000	306	311	0.984	Pool G or Pool H
4	Bulgaria	3	0	3	2	4	9	0.444	271	299	0.906	Pool G or Pool H

Date	Time		Score		Set 1	Set 2	Set 3	Set 4	Set 5	Total	Report
01 Aug	16:00	United States	3–0	Bulgaria	25–22	25–18	25–21			75–61	P2
01 Aug	18:30	Brazil	2–3	Japan	25–21	19–25	20–25	25–22	16–18	105–111	P2
02 Aug	16:00	Japan	3–2	Bulgaria	20–25	20–25	33–31	25–18	15–11	113–110	P2
02 Aug	18:30	Brazil	3–1	United States	25–19	21–25	25–23	25–19		96–86	P2
03 Aug	16:00	United States	3–1	Japan	25–20	21–25	25–18	25–19		96–82	P2
03 Aug	18:30	Bulgaria	2–3	Brazil	25–23	19–25	25–23	23–25	8–15	100–111	P2

=== Pool B ===
Pos	Team	Pld	W	L	Pts	SW	SL	SR	SPW	SPL	SPR	Qualification
1	Argentina	3	3	0	9	9	2	4.500	270	207	1.304	Pool E or Pool F
2	Spain	3	2	1	6	7	3	2.333	217	186	1.167	Pool E or Pool F
3	Puerto Rico	3	1	2	2	4	8	0.500	226	267	0.846	Pool G or Pool H
4	Tunisia	3	0	3	1	2	9	0.222	205	258	0.795	Pool G or Pool H

Date	Time		Score		Set 1	Set 2	Set 3	Set 4	Set 5	Total	Report
01 Aug	10:00	Argentina	3–1	Puerto Rico	23–25	25–17	25–19	25–17		98–78	P2
01 Aug	12:30	Tunisia	0–3	Spain	14–25	18–25	17–25			49–75	P2
02 Aug	10:00	Puerto Rico	0–3	Spain	7–25	15–25	18–25			40–75	P2
02 Aug	12:30	Argentina	3–0	Tunisia	25–17	25–23	25–22			75–62	P2
03 Aug	10:00	Spain	1–3	Argentina	20–25	25–22	14–25	8–25		67–97	P2
03 Aug	12:30	Tunisia	2–3	Puerto Rico	25–20	13–25	25–23	20–25	11–15	94–108	P2

=== Pool C ===
Pos	Team	Pld	W	L	Pts	SW	SL	SR	SPW	SPL	SPR	Qualification
1	Russia	3	3	0	9	9	1	9.000	249	195	1.277	Pool E or Pool F
2	India	3	2	1	6	6	4	1.500	227	218	1.041	Pool E or Pool F
3	Egypt	3	1	2	3	3	7	0.429	197	242	0.814	Pool G or Pool H
4	Germany	3	0	3	0	3	9	0.333	273	291	0.938	Pool G or Pool H

Date	Time		Score		Set 1	Set 2	Set 3	Set 4	Set 5	Total	Report
01 Aug	10:00	India	3–1	Germany	19–25	25–21	25–23	25–20		94–89	P2
01 Aug	12:30	Russia	3–0	Egypt	25–16	25–16	25–13			75–45	P2
02 Aug	10:00	Egypt	3–1	Germany	26–24	25–20	22–25	25–23		98–92	P2
02 Aug	12:30	Russia	3–0	India	25–23	25–17	25–18			75–58	P2
03 Aug	10:00	India	3–0	Egypt	25–17	25–19	25–18			75–54	P2
03 Aug	12:30	Germany	1–3	Russia	20–25	26–24	23–25	23–25		92–99	P2

=== Pool D ===
Pos	Team	Pld	W	L	Pts	SW	SL	SR	SPW	SPL	SPR	Qualification
1	Serbia	3	3	0	7	9	4	2.250	295	247	1.194	Pool E or Pool F
2	Iran	3	2	1	7	8	4	2.000	282	258	1.093	Pool E or Pool F
3	Belgium	3	1	2	3	4	6	0.667	212	235	0.902	Pool G or Pool H
4	Canada	3	0	3	1	2	9	0.222	206	255	0.808	Pool G or Pool H

Date	Time		Score		Set 1	Set 2	Set 3	Set 4	Set 5	Total	Report
01 Aug	16:00	Iran	3–0	Canada	25–19	25–19	25–20			75–58	P2
01 Aug	18:30	Serbia	3–0	Belgium	25–21	25–15	25–16			75–52	P2
02 Aug	16:00	Canada	0–3	Belgium	23–25	22–25	17–25			62–75	P2
02 Aug	18:30	Iran	2–3	Serbia	25–23	25–22	28–30	18–25	13–15	109–115	P2
03 Aug	16:00	Belgium	1–3	Iran	20–25	25–23	23–25	17–25		85–98	P2
03 Aug	18:30	Serbia	3–2	Canada	25–17	19–25	25–15	21–25	15–4	105–86	P2

== Second round ==
- All times are Brasília Time (UTC−03:00).

=== Pool E ===
Pos	Team	Pld	W	L	Pts	SW	SL	SR	SPW	SPL	SPR	Qualification
1	Russia	3	3	0	8	9	2	4.500	261	225	1.160	Semifinals
2	United States	3	2	1	6	8	6	1.333	316	299	1.057	Semifinals
3	Iran	3	1	2	3	4	6	0.667	215	239	0.900	5th–8th semifinals
4	Spain	3	0	3	1	2	9	0.222	236	265	0.891	5th–8th semifinals

Date	Time		Score		Set 1	Set 2	Set 3	Set 4	Set 5	Total	Report
05 Aug	12:30	Spain	0–3	Russia	20–25	18–25	20–25			58–75	P2
05 Aug	16:00	United States	3–1	Iran	22–25	25–20	25–15	25–17		97–77	P2
06 Aug	10:00	Iran	0–3	Russia	21–25	19–25	22–25			62–75	P2
06 Aug	16:00	United States	3–2	Spain	25–21	20–25	26–24	28–30	15–11	114–111	P2
07 Aug	10:00	Spain	0–3	Iran	24–26	20–25	23–25			67–76	P2
07 Aug	16:00	Russia	3–2	United States	19–25	27–29	25–21	25–17	15–13	111–105	P2

=== Pool F ===
Pos	Team	Pld	W	L	Pts	SW	SL	SR	SPW	SPL	SPR	Qualification
1	Argentina	3	2	1	7	8	5	1.600	276	276	1.000	Semifinals
2	Serbia	3	2	1	5	6	6	1.000	261	248	1.052	Semifinals
3	Brazil	3	1	2	4	6	6	1.000	276	266	1.038	5th–8th semifinals
4	India	3	1	2	2	5	8	0.625	286	309	0.926	5th–8th semifinals

Date	Time		Score		Set 1	Set 2	Set 3	Set 4	Set 5	Total	Report
05 Aug	10:00	Argentina	3–1	India	25–21	23–25	25–16	25–19		98–81	P2
05 Aug	18:30	Brazil	3–0	Serbia	25–16	25–19	25–21			75–56	P2
06 Aug	12:30	Serbia	3–1	India	25–13	19–25	25–22	27–25		96–85	P2
06 Aug	18:30	Brazil	1–3	Argentina	25–14	20–25	24–26	17–25		86–90	P2
07 Aug	12:30	Argentina	2–3	Serbia	26–24	18–25	25–20	10–25	9–15	88–109	P2
07 Aug	18:30	India	3–2	Brazil	36–34	22–25	21–25	25–17	16–14	120–115	P2

=== Pool G ===
Pos	Team	Pld	W	L	Pts	SW	SL	SR	SPW	SPL	SPR	Qualification
1	Canada	3	3	0	8	9	3	3.000	276	230	1.200	9th–12th semifinals
2	Japan	3	2	1	5	6	5	1.200	219	235	0.932	9th–12th semifinals
3	Tunisia	3	1	2	3	4	7	0.571	244	248	0.984	13th–16th semifinals
4	Egypt	3	0	3	2	5	9	0.556	278	304	0.914	13th–16th semifinals

Date	Time		Score		Set 1	Set 2	Set 3	Set 4	Set 5	Total	Report
05 Aug	10:00	Japan	0–3	Canada	12–25	17–25	14–25			43–75	P2
05 Aug	12:30	Tunisia	3–1	Egypt	23–25	25–21	25–18	25–13		98–77	P2
06 Aug	12:30	Canada	3–2	Egypt	19–25	25–20	25–17	21–25	15–11	105–98	P2
06 Aug	16:00	Japan	3–0	Tunisia	25–19	25–20	25–18			75–57	P2
07 Aug	10:00	Tunisia	1–3	Canada	20–25	21–25	25–21	23–25		89–96	P2
07 Aug	18:30	Egypt	2–3	Japan	18–25	25–15	25–20	21–25	14–16	103–101	P2

=== Pool H ===
Pos	Team	Pld	W	L	Pts	SW	SL	SR	SPW	SPL	SPR	Qualification
1	Belgium	3	3	0	8	9	3	3.000	284	258	1.101	9th–12th semifinals
2	Germany	3	2	1	7	8	4	2.000	293	268	1.093	9th–12th semifinals
3	Bulgaria	3	1	2	3	4	6	0.667	239	222	1.077	13th–16th semifinals
4	Puerto Rico	3	0	3	0	1	9	0.111	189	257	0.735	13th–16th semifinals

Date	Time		Score		Set 1	Set 2	Set 3	Set 4	Set 5	Total	Report
05 Aug	16:00	Puerto Rico	1–3	Germany	14–25	22–25	34–32	12–25		82–107	P2
05 Aug	18:30	Bulgaria	1–3	Belgium	23–25	19–25	25–22	23–25		90–97	P2
06 Aug	10:00	Belgium	3–2	Germany	23–25	25–20	28–26	21–25	15–10	112–106	P2
06 Aug	18:30	Bulgaria	3–0	Puerto Rico	25–15	25–12	25–18			75–45	P2
07 Aug	12:30	Puerto Rico	0–3	Belgium	22–25	19–25	21–25			62–75	P2
07 Aug	16:00	Germany	3–0	Bulgaria	25–23	29–27	26–24			80–74	P2

== Final round ==
- All times are Brasília Time (UTC−03:00).

=== 13th–16th places ===
13th–16th semifinals
8 August
Tunisia	3
Puerto Rico	2
8 August
Bulgaria	3
Egypt	0

13th place match
9 August
Tunisia	0
Bulgaria	3
15th place match
9 August
Puerto Rico	1
Egypt	3

==== 13th–16th semifinals ====
Date	Time		Score		Set 1	Set 2	Set 3	Set 4	Set 5	Total	Report
08 Aug	16:00	Tunisia	3–2	Puerto Rico	27–29	25–21	25–21	23–25	15–12	115–108	P2
08 Aug	19:00	Bulgaria	3–0	Egypt	25–22	25–19	25–19			75–60	P2

==== 15th place match ====
Date	Time		Score		Set 1	Set 2	Set 3	Set 4	Set 5	Total	Report
09 Aug	16:00	Puerto Rico	1–3	Egypt	25–17	14–25	23–25	21–25		83–92	P2

==== 13th place match ====
Date	Time		Score		Set 1	Set 2	Set 3	Set 4	Set 5	Total	Report
09 Aug	18:30	Tunisia	0–3	Bulgaria	15–25	22–25	17–25			54–75	P2

=== 9th–12th places ===
9th–12th semifinals
9 August
Canada	1
Germany	3
9 August
Belgium	3
Japan	0

9th place match
10 August
Germany	2
Belgium	3
11th place match
10 August
Canada	3
Japan	0

==== 9th–12th semifinals ====
Date	Time		Score		Set 1	Set 2	Set 3	Set 4	Set 5	Total	Report
09 Aug	10:00	Canada	1–3	Germany	25–16	19–25	23–25	18–25		85–91	P2
09 Aug	12:30	Belgium	3–0	Japan	25–19	25–22	25–18			75–59	P2

==== 11th place match ====
Date	Time		Score		Set 1	Set 2	Set 3	Set 4	Set 5	Total	Report
10 Aug	09:00	Canada	3–0	Japan	25–23	25–20	25–19			75–62	P2

==== 9th place match ====
Date	Time		Score		Set 1	Set 2	Set 3	Set 4	Set 5	Total	Report
10 Aug	11:00	Germany	2–3	Belgium	22–25	25–22	25–22	28–30	11–15	111–114	P2

=== 5th–8th places ===
5th–8th semifinals
9 August
Iran	3
India	0
9 August
Brazil	3
Spain	1

5th place match
10 August
Iran	2
Brazil	3
7th place match
10 August
India	2
Spain	3

==== 5th–8th semifinals ====
Date	Time		Score		Set 1	Set 2	Set 3	Set 4	Set 5	Total	Report
09 Aug	10:00	Iran	3–0	India	25–11	25–22	25–21			75–54	P2
09 Aug	18:30	Brazil	3–1	Spain	25–20	18–25	25–20	25–16		93–81	P2

==== 7th place match ====
Date	Time		Score		Set 1	Set 2	Set 3	Set 4	Set 5	Total	Report
10 Aug	09:00	India	2–3	Spain	25–21	25–17	21–25	12–25	17–19	100–107	P2

==== 5th place match ====
Date	Time		Score		Set 1	Set 2	Set 3	Set 4	Set 5	Total	Report
10 Aug	11:00	Iran	2–3	Brazil	22–25	25–20	25–19	22–25	10–15	104–104	P2

=== Final four ===
Semifinals
9 August
Argentina	3
United States	1
9 August
Russia	3
Serbia	1

Final
10 August
Argentina	2
Russia	3
3rd place match
10 August
United States	1
Serbia	3

==== Semifinals ====
Date	Time		Score		Set 1	Set 2	Set 3	Set 4	Set 5	Total	Report
09 Aug	12:30	Argentina	3–1	United States	27–29	28–26	25–19	25–20		105–94	P2
09 Aug	16:00	Russia	3–1	Serbia	25–22	25–15	23–25	25–13		98–75	P2

==== 3rd place match ====
Date	Time		Score		Set 1	Set 2	Set 3	Set 4	Set 5	Total	Report
10 Aug	13:30	United States	1–3	Serbia	15–25	20–25	25–23	13–25		73–98	P2

==== Final ====
Date	Time		Score		Set 1	Set 2	Set 3	Set 4	Set 5	Total	Report
10 Aug	16:00	Argentina	2–3	Russia	19–25	25–23	25–21	18–25	12–15	99–109	P2

== Final standing ==
Rank	Team
1st place, gold medalist(s)	Russia
2nd place, silver medalist(s)	Argentina
3rd place, bronze medalist(s)	Serbia
4	United States
5	Brazil
6	Iran
7	Spain
8	India
9	Belgium
10	Germany
11	Canada
12	Japan
13	Bulgaria
14	Tunisia
15	Egypt
16	Puerto Rico

2011 Men's U21 World champions

Russia
8th title

11–man Roster
Igor Filippov, Alexander Safonov, Dmitry Kovalev (C), Bogdan Glivenko, Aleksey Kabeshov, Andrey Kolesnik, Leonid Shchadilov, Alexey Pluzhnikov, Igor Tisevich, Oleg Tsentalovich, Valentine Krotkov
Head coach
Sergey Shlyapnikov

== Awards ==
- Most valuable player
  - Leonid Shchadilov (RUS)
- Best scorer
  - Aleksandar Atanasijević (SRB)
- Best spiker
  - Leonid Shchadilov (RUS)
- Best blocker
  - Igor Filippov (RUS)
- Best server
  - Amir Ghafour (IRI)
- Best digger
  - Tomás Ruiz (ARG)
- Best setter
  - Jesus Bruque (ESP)
- Best receiver
  - Sivasubramanian Kanagaraj (IND)
- Best libero
  - Aleksey Kabeshov (RUS)
