= 2019 FIVB Volleyball Men's U21 World Championship squads =

This article shows the rosters of all participating teams at the 2019 FIVB Volleyball Men's U21 World Championship in Bahrain.

== Argentina ==
The following is the Argentine roster in the 2019 FIVB Volleyball Men's U21 World Championship.

Head coach: Alejandro Grossi

No.	Name	Date of birth	Height	Weight	Spike	Block	2019 club
1	Santiago Arroyo	10 August 1999	1.73 m (5 ft 8 in)	75 kg (165 lb)	305 cm (120 in)	290 cm (110 in)	(Argentina) Club de Amigos
2	Tobias Pinto	13 July 2000	1.83 m (6 ft 0 in)	75 kg (165 lb)	315 cm (124 in)	300 cm (120 in)	(Argentina) River Plate
3	Joaquin Alzueta	28 January 2000	1.96 m (6 ft 5 in)	76 kg (168 lb)	330 cm (130 in)	310 cm (120 in)	(Argentina) River Plate
4	Octavio Hermida	26 April 2000	1.82 m (6 ft 0 in)	78 kg (172 lb)	324 cm (128 in)	305 cm (120 in)	(Argentina) Ciudad de Bs. As.
5	Juan Barrera	21 May 1999	2.01 m (6 ft 7 in)	93 kg (205 lb)	345 cm (136 in)	320 cm (130 in)	(Argentina) Regatas de Mendoza
6	Franco Medina	30 March 1999	1.97 m (6 ft 6 in)	95 kg (209 lb)	342 cm (135 in)	325 cm (128 in)	(Argentina) UNLaM
7	Luciano Palonsky C	8 July 1999	1.98 m (6 ft 6 in)	72 kg (159 lb)	330 cm (130 in)	310 cm (120 in)	(Argentina) Club Ciudad de Buenos Aires
8	Nicolas Zerba	13 June 1999	2.03 m (6 ft 8 in)	94 kg (207 lb)	334 cm (131 in)	311 cm (122 in)	(Argentina) UNLaM
9	Federico José Seia	22 November 1999	1.91 m (6 ft 3 in)	78 kg (172 lb)	332 cm (131 in)	315 cm (124 in)	(Argentina) Trinitarios de Villa María
13	Federico Arquez	24 January 2000	1.84 m (6 ft 0 in)	66 kg (146 lb)	310 cm (120 in)	285 cm (112 in)	(Argentina) Ciudad de Buenos Aires
14	Luciano Vicentín	4 April 2000	1.97 m (6 ft 6 in)	84 kg (185 lb)	333 cm (131 in)	315 cm (124 in)	(Argentina) River Plate
17	Gaston Muller	12 October 1999	1.95 m (6 ft 5 in)	74 kg (163 lb)	339 cm (133 in)	318 cm (125 in)	(Argentina) Libertad S. J.

== Brazil ==
The following is the Brazilian roster in the 2019 FIVB Volleyball Men's U21 World Championship.

Head coach: Giovane Gávio

No.	Name	Date of birth	Height	Weight	Spike	Block	2019 club
1	Nathan Krupp	20 November 2001	1.95 m (6 ft 5 in)	96 kg (212 lb)	335 cm (132 in)	317 cm (125 in)	(Brazil) SESI SP
2	Bruno Ruivo	30 June 1999	1.82 m (6 ft 0 in)	82 kg (181 lb)	300 cm (120 in)	290 cm (110 in)	(Brazil) Brasl Volei Clube
3	Gustavo Orlando	10 August 2002	1.89 m (6 ft 2 in)	89 kg (196 lb)	335 cm (132 in)	315 cm (124 in)	(Brazil) Minas Tênis Clube
4	Rhendrick Rosa (C)	11 February 1999	1.83 m (6 ft 0 in)	82 kg (181 lb)	310 cm (120 in)	295 cm (116 in)	(Brazil) Sada Cruzeiro Volei
5	Gabriel Cotrim	30 October 1999	2.04 m (6 ft 8 in)	108 kg (238 lb)	341 cm (134 in)	328 cm (129 in)	(Brazil) BRASIL KIRIN
6	Marcus Coelho	29 September 2000	1.99 m (6 ft 6 in)	87 kg (192 lb)	332 cm (131 in)	311 cm (122 in)	(Brazil) MINAS TENIS CLUBE
7	Victor Cardoso	22 March 1999	1.99 m (6 ft 6 in)	86 kg (190 lb)	350 cm (140 in)	325 cm (128 in)	(Brazil) SESI-SP
10	Lucas Figueiredo	20 April 1999	1.9 m (6 ft 3 in)	77 kg (170 lb)	318 cm (125 in)	303 cm (119 in)	(Brazil) Minas Tênis Clube
12	Angellus Silva	6 September 2000	2.01 m (6 ft 7 in)	92 kg (203 lb)	358 cm (141 in)	335 cm (132 in)	(Brazil) Volei Renata
14	Guilherme Voss Santos	14 April 2000	1.98 m (6 ft 6 in)	87 kg (192 lb)	346 cm (136 in)	329 cm (130 in)	(Brazil) FLAMENGO
16	Edson Paixão	29 March 2000	2.01 m (6 ft 7 in)	81 kg (179 lb)	346 cm (136 in)	326 cm (128 in)	(Brazil) MINAS TENIS CLUBE
20	Welinton Oppenkoski	28 March 2000	1.95 m (6 ft 5 in)	90 kg (200 lb)	337 cm (133 in)	325 cm (128 in)	(Brazil) Sada Cruzeiro Volei

== Bahrain ==
The following is the Bahraini roster in the 2019 FIVB Volleyball Men's U21 World Championship.

Head coach: Yusuf Khalifa

No.	Name	Date of birth	Height	Weight	Spike	Block	2019 club
1	Sayed Mohamed Alabbar	8 September 1999	1.89 m (6 ft 2 in)	66 kg (146 lb)	322 cm (127 in)	303 cm (119 in)	(Bahrain) ALAHLI
2	Jawher Rashed	8 September 1999	1.92 m (6 ft 4 in)	69 kg (152 lb)	328 cm (129 in)	304 cm (120 in)	(Bahrain) ALNAJMA
4	Mohamed Jasim	30 November 1999	1.92 m (6 ft 4 in)	63 kg (139 lb)	328 cm (129 in)	309 cm (122 in)	(Bahrain) NABIHSALEH
7	Mohamed Haroona	17 October 1999	1.87 m (6 ft 2 in)	72 kg (159 lb)	320 cm (130 in)	297 cm (117 in)	(Bahrain) DARKULAIB
8	Hasan Haider	23 October 2000	1.97 m (6 ft 6 in)	85 kg (187 lb)	319 cm (126 in)	302 cm (119 in)	(Bahrain) MUHARRAQ
10	Jasim Matrook	20 August 2000	1.78 m (5 ft 10 in)	61 kg (134 lb)	329 cm (130 in)	306 cm (120 in)	(Bahrain) AL NASEER
11	Husain Thamer	29 July 1999	1.8 m (5 ft 11 in)	72 kg (159 lb)	317 cm (125 in)	297 cm (117 in)	(Bahrain) DARKULAIB
12	Bader Husain	31 March 2001	1.76 m (5 ft 9 in)	67 kg (148 lb)	300 cm (120 in)	290 cm (110 in)	(Bahrain) MUHARRAQ
13	Hasan Mohamed	27 July 1999	1.82 m (6 ft 0 in)	67 kg (148 lb)	327 cm (129 in)	294 cm (116 in)	(Bahrain) MUHARRAQ
14	Mahmood Abdulhusain C	20 January 1999	1.82 m (6 ft 0 in)	71 kg (157 lb)	316 cm (124 in)	293 cm (115 in)	(Bahrain) ALAHLI
15	Yusuf Saif	11 April 1999	1.82 m (6 ft 0 in)	83 kg (183 lb)	302 cm (119 in)	288 cm (113 in)	(Bahrain) MUHARRAQ
18	Husain Abdulla	29 August 2000	1.67 m (5 ft 6 in)	57 kg (126 lb)	277 cm (109 in)	282 cm (111 in)	(Bahrain) DARKULAIB

== Canada ==
The following is the Canadian roster in the 2019 FIVB Volleyball Men's U21 World Championship.

Head coach: João Paulo Bravo

No.	Name	Date of birth	Height	Weight	Spike	Block	2019 club
2	Matthew Neaves	21 June 2000	2.07 m (6 ft 9 in)	76 kg (168 lb)	360 cm (140 in)	335 cm (132 in)	Team Canada
6	Mathias Elser C	3 June 2001	1.98 m (6 ft 6 in)	76 kg (168 lb)	340 cm (130 in)	312 cm (123 in)	Team Canada
8	Justin Lui	8 May 2000	1.78 m (5 ft 10 in)	68 kg (150 lb)	304 cm (120 in)	283 cm (111 in)	Team Canada
9	Alexis Tournier	27 November 1999	1.9 m (6 ft 3 in)	77 kg (170 lb)	341 cm (134 in)	308 cm (121 in)	Team Canada
10	Brodie Hofer	27 April 2000	1.99 m (6 ft 6 in)	92 kg (203 lb)	351 cm (138 in)	320 cm (130 in)	Team Canada
11	Jackson Bere	7 February 2000	1.99 m (6 ft 6 in)	99 kg (218 lb)	351 cm (138 in)	322 cm (127 in)	Team Canada
12	Jordan Canham	4 July 2000	1.95 m (6 ft 5 in)	97 kg (214 lb)	353 cm (139 in)	321 cm (126 in)	Team Canada
14	Xander Ketrzynski	27 January 2000	2.08 m (6 ft 10 in)	90 kg (200 lb)	359 cm (141 in)	330 cm (130 in)	Team Canada
15	Coltyn Liu	7 June 1999	1.94 m (6 ft 4 in)	89 kg (196 lb)	342 cm (135 in)	318 cm (125 in)	Team Canada
17	Colm Guyn	17 May 1999	1.95 m (6 ft 5 in)	90 kg (200 lb)	345 cm (136 in)	317 cm (125 in)	Team Canada
18	Fynnian Lionel Mccarthy	4 December 1999	2 m (6 ft 7 in)	89 kg (196 lb)	362 cm (143 in)	321 cm (126 in)	(Canada) Montpellier
19	Jesse Elser	27 May 1999	2.03 m (6 ft 8 in)	86 kg (190 lb)	342 cm (135 in)	315 cm (124 in)	Team Canada

== China ==
The following is the Chinese roster in the 2019 FIVB Volleyball Men's U21 World Championship.

Head coach: Hao Liu

No.	Name	Date of birth	Height	Weight	Spike	Block	2019 club
3	Cong Tian	16 October 1999	1.93 m (6 ft 4 in)	90 kg (200 lb)	350 cm (140 in)	340 cm (130 in)	(China) Shanghai
4	Xinyu Zhang	3 November 1999	2.12 m (6 ft 11 in)	100 kg (220 lb)	340 cm (130 in)	340 cm (130 in)	(China) Tianjin
5	Boliang Chen	15 March 1999	1.9 m (6 ft 3 in)	82 kg (181 lb)	320 cm (130 in)	320 cm (130 in)	(China) Sichuan
6	Jianfei Diao	12 February 2000	2.01 m (6 ft 7 in)	80 kg (180 lb)	340 cm (130 in)	330 cm (130 in)	(China) Shandong
7	Chengcheng Xiu	23 August 1999	2 m (6 ft 7 in)	92 kg (203 lb)	350 cm (140 in)	340 cm (130 in)	(China) Bayi
8	Leiyang Chen C	25 January 1999	1.98 m (6 ft 6 in)	95 kg (209 lb)	345 cm (136 in)	340 cm (130 in)	(China) Zhejiang
12	Dongzheng Zhang	4 April 1999	1.98 m (6 ft 6 in)	81 kg (179 lb)	341 cm (134 in)	331 cm (130 in)	(China) Shandong
13	Qi Qi	4 February 1999	1.99 m (6 ft 6 in)	95 kg (209 lb)	345 cm (136 in)	341 cm (134 in)	(China) Shanghai
15	Zongshuai Qu	20 January 1999	1.86 m (6 ft 1 in)	73 kg (161 lb)	330 cm (130 in)	310 cm (120 in)	(China) Bayi
16	Dejun Zhai	2 January 2000	1.95 m (6 ft 5 in)	82 kg (181 lb)	330 cm (130 in)	330 cm (130 in)	(China) Shandong
17	Zhuang Gao	12 February 2000	2.02 m (6 ft 8 in)	88 kg (194 lb)	340 cm (130 in)	320 cm (130 in)	(China) Shandong
18	Ao Li	5 June 2000	1.9 m (6 ft 3 in)	75 kg (165 lb)	345 cm (136 in)	323 cm (127 in)	(China) Liaonin

== Cuba ==
The following is the Cuban roster in the 2019 FIVB Volleyball Men's U21 World Championship.

Head coach: Angel Cruz

No.	Name	Date of birth	Height	Weight	Spike	Block	2019 club
1	Jose Miguel Gutierrez Suarez	27 October 2001	1.92 m (6 ft 4 in)	73 kg (161 lb)	329 cm (130 in)	325 cm (128 in)	(Cuba) Villa Clara
2	Christian Manuel Thondike Mejias	28 May 2001	1.95 m (6 ft 5 in)	76 kg (168 lb)	340 cm (130 in)	336 cm (132 in)	(Cuba) La Habana
3	Julio Cesar Cardenas Morales	4 September 2000	1.9 m (6 ft 3 in)	72 kg (159 lb)	345 cm (136 in)	320 cm (130 in)	(Cuba) Matanzas
5	Carlos Yoandrys Charles Santana	4 October 2000	1.91 m (6 ft 3 in)	75 kg (165 lb)	345 cm (136 in)	338 cm (133 in)	(Cuba) Ciego de Avila
6	Adrian Chirino Callam	26 March 2002	1.94 m (6 ft 4 in)	84 kg (185 lb)	329 cm (130 in)	325 cm (128 in)	(Cuba) Camaguey
7	Ricardo Gomez Alonso	1 April 2001	2.02 m (6 ft 8 in)	78 kg (172 lb)	350 cm (140 in)	348 cm (137 in)	(Cuba) Mayabeque
8	Julio Alberto Gomez Galves C	24 July 1999	1.91 m (6 ft 3 in)	72 kg (159 lb)	343 cm (135 in)	320 cm (130 in)	(Cuba) La Habana
9	Henry Jose Pelayo Bernal	30 December 2000	2.02 m (6 ft 8 in)	90 kg (200 lb)	345 cm (136 in)	340 cm (130 in)	(Cuba) Camaguey
13	Jose Carlos Romero Gonzalez	5 January 1999	1.98 m (6 ft 6 in)	85 kg (187 lb)	350 cm (140 in)	325 cm (128 in)	(Cuba) Cienfuegos
14	Luis Vidal Allen Serrano	2 May 2001	1.95 m (6 ft 5 in)	67 kg (148 lb)	350 cm (140 in)	348 cm (137 in)	(Cuba) La Habana
19	Victor Ramon Andreu Flores	31 August 2001	1.88 m (6 ft 2 in)	72 kg (159 lb)	345 cm (136 in)	338 cm (133 in)	(Cuba) Camaguey
21	Raico Antonio Altunaga Saroza	2 September 1999	1.98 m (6 ft 6 in)	76 kg (168 lb)	352 cm (139 in)	345 cm (136 in)	(Cuba) Santic Spiritus

== Czech Republic ==
The following is the Czech roster in the 2019 FIVB Volleyball Men's U21 World Championship.

Head coach: Jan Svoboda

No.	Name	Date of birth	Height	Weight	Spike	Block	2019 club
1	Jan Pavlicek	7 March 2000	1.75 m (5 ft 9 in)	76 kg (168 lb)	308 cm (121 in)	288 cm (113 in)	(Czech Republic) VK Dukla Liberec
2	Radim Sulc	29 October 1999	1.81 m (5 ft 11 in)	70 kg (150 lb)	320 cm (130 in)	305 cm (120 in)	(Czech Republic) VSC Zlin
4	Ondrej Piskacek C	23 January 1999	1.91 m (6 ft 3 in)	79 kg (174 lb)	334 cm (131 in)	322 cm (127 in)	(Czech Republic) VK Ceske Budejovice
5	Josef Polak	11 February 1999	2.01 m (6 ft 7 in)	78 kg (172 lb)	344 cm (135 in)	333 cm (131 in)	(Czech Republic) VK Pribram
6	Filip Humler	24 July 1999	2 m (6 ft 7 in)	95 kg (209 lb)	350 cm (140 in)	325 cm (128 in)	(Czech Republic) VK Ceske Budejovice
9	Adam Kozak	11 June 1999	1.94 m (6 ft 4 in)	78 kg (172 lb)	344 cm (135 in)	332 cm (131 in)	(Czech Republic) VSC Zlin
10	Jan Svoboda	30 July 2000	1.94 m (6 ft 4 in)	80 kg (180 lb)	338 cm (133 in)	327 cm (129 in)	(Czech Republic) Lvi Praha
11	Lukas Vasina	6 July 1999	1.92 m (6 ft 4 in)	75 kg (165 lb)	340 cm (130 in)	330 cm (130 in)	(Czech Republic) VK Karlovarsko
15	Pavel Horak	27 June 1999	2.02 m (6 ft 8 in)	86 kg (190 lb)	339 cm (133 in)	328 cm (129 in)	(Czech Republic) Lvi Praha
17	Marek Sotola	5 November 1999	2 m (6 ft 7 in)	83 kg (183 lb)	348 cm (137 in)	335 cm (132 in)	(Czech Republic) VK Ceske Budejovice
20	Lukas Trojanowicz	4 July 2000	1.98 m (6 ft 6 in)	86 kg (190 lb)	340 cm (130 in)	336 cm (132 in)	(Czech Republic) VK Pribram
21	Martin Chevalier	4 August 2000	1.96 m (6 ft 5 in)	85 kg (187 lb)	345 cm (136 in)	322 cm (127 in)	(Czech Republic) Lvi Praha

== Egypt ==
The following is the Egyptian roster in the 2019 FIVB Volleyball Men's U21 World Championship.

Head coach: Hossameldin Eissawy

No.	Name	Date of birth	Height	Weight	Spike	Block	2019 club
1	Youssef Hamdy Awad	27 August 2000	1.94 m (6 ft 4 in)	90 kg (200 lb)	318 cm (125 in)	308 cm (121 in)	(Egypt) Al Ahly SC
2	Ahmed Azab Abdelrahman	1 March 2000	1.94 m (6 ft 4 in)	78 kg (172 lb)	310 cm (120 in)	288 cm (113 in)	(Egypt) Petrojet
3	Mohamed Abdelgawad	17 August 2000	1.99 m (6 ft 6 in)	86 kg (190 lb)	312 cm (123 in)	290 cm (110 in)	(Egypt) El Gesh SC
4	Amr Ramadan	6 July 1999	1.98 m (6 ft 6 in)	95 kg (209 lb)	317 cm (125 in)	293 cm (115 in)	(Egypt) El Gesh SC
7	Seifeldin Hassan Aly	14 July 1999	1.93 m (6 ft 4 in)	90 kg (200 lb)	306 cm (120 in)	282 cm (111 in)	(Egypt) Zamalek SC
9	Mohanad Hamam Sayed	19 April 1999	1.84 m (6 ft 0 in)	77 kg (170 lb)	300 cm (120 in)	283 cm (111 in)	(Egypt) Petrojet
11	Omar Zakaria Becheir	10 April 2000	1.99 m (6 ft 6 in)	98 kg (216 lb)	311 cm (122 in)	297 cm (117 in)	(Egypt) Al Ahly SC
12	George Bakhit C	20 February 1999	1.89 m (6 ft 2 in)	91 kg (201 lb)	334 cm (131 in)	308 cm (121 in)	(Egypt) Zamalek SC
14	Yossef Saadeldin Morgan	13 April 1999	1.84 m (6 ft 0 in)	86 kg (190 lb)	304 cm (120 in)	282 cm (111 in)	(Egypt) Al Ahly SC
15	Mohamed Osman Elhaddad	22 September 2000	2.12 m (6 ft 11 in)	105 kg (231 lb)	321 cm (126 in)	295 cm (116 in)	(Egypt) Al Ahly SC
16	Shehab Azab Elsayed	1 January 1999	1.99 m (6 ft 6 in)	97 kg (214 lb)	317 cm (125 in)	293 cm (115 in)	(Egypt) Petrojet
20	Mahmoud Erfan	15 June 1999	1.81 m (5 ft 11 in)	78 kg (172 lb)	288 cm (113 in)	270 cm (110 in)	(Egypt) 6 October Club

== Iran ==
The following is the Iranian roster in the 2019 FIVB Volleyball Men's U21 World Championship.

Head coach: Behrouz Ataei

No.	Name	Date of birth	Height	Weight	Spike	Block	2019 club
1	Mahdi Jelveh	21 May 2001	2.08 m (6 ft 10 in)	85 kg (187 lb)	355 cm (140 in)	330 cm (130 in)	(Iran) Dorna
2	Mohammad Reza Hazratpour	31 March 1999	1.87 m (6 ft 2 in)	87 kg (192 lb)	300 cm (120 in)	290 cm (110 in)	(Iran) Saipa
4	Amir Hossein Toukhteh	9 April 2001	2.03 m (6 ft 8 in)	79 kg (174 lb)	360 cm (140 in)	330 cm (130 in)	(Iran) Saipa
6	Amir Mohammad Falahat	19 May 2000	1.99 m (6 ft 6 in)	89 kg (196 lb)	330 cm (130 in)	310 cm (120 in)	(Iran) Paykan
7	Ehsan Daneshdoust	1 January 2000	1.92 m (6 ft 4 in)	76 kg (168 lb)	330 cm (130 in)	310 cm (120 in)	(Iran) Gonbad
9	Mehran Feyz	23 November 2001	2.05 m (6 ft 9 in)	77 kg (170 lb)	350 cm (140 in)	325 cm (128 in)	(Iran) Kaleh
11	Bardia Saadat	12 August 2002	2.05 m (6 ft 9 in)	87 kg (192 lb)	355 cm (140 in)	328 cm (129 in)	(Iran) Dorna
12	Amir Hossein Esfandiar (C)	24 January 1999	2.09 m (6 ft 10 in)	110 kg (240 lb)	330 cm (130 in)	310 cm (120 in)	(Iran) Paykan
13	Soheil Kamalabadi	14 January 2001	1.98 m (6 ft 6 in)	81 kg (179 lb)	340 cm (130 in)	320 cm (130 in)	(Iran) Dorna
18	Amir Hossein Saberi	26 December 1999	1.99 m (6 ft 6 in)	79 kg (174 lb)	330 cm (130 in)	312 cm (123 in)	(Iran) Saipa
20	Porya Yali	21 January 1999	2.09 m (6 ft 10 in)	81 kg (179 lb)	335 cm (132 in)	320 cm (130 in)	(Iran) Paykan
21	Morteza Sharifi	27 May 1999	1.93 m (6 ft 4 in)	83 kg (183 lb)	340 cm (130 in)	320 cm (130 in)	(Italy) Verona

== Italy ==
The following is the Italian roster in the 2019 FIVB Volleyball Men's U21 World Championship.

Head coach: Monica Cresta

No.	Name	Date of birth	Height	Weight	Spike	Block	2019 club
1	Davide Gardini	11 February 1999	2.05 m (6 ft 9 in)	94 kg (207 lb)	330 cm (130 in)	310 cm (120 in)	(Italy) Volley Lube
2	Lorenzo Cortesia	26 July 1999	1.98 m (6 ft 6 in)	75 kg (165 lb)	328 cm (129 in)	300 cm (120 in)	(Italy) Volley Treviso
4	Nicola Zonta	15 May 2000	1.84 m (6 ft 0 in)	70 kg (150 lb)	334 cm (131 in)	309 cm (122 in)	(Italy) Club Italia
5	Matheus Motzo	9 September 1999	1.9 m (6 ft 3 in)	84 kg (185 lb)	340 cm (130 in)	320 cm (130 in)	(Italy) Club Italia
7	Filippo Federici	26 December 2000	1.72 m (5 ft 8 in)	67 kg (148 lb)	295 cm (116 in)	250 cm (98 in)	(Italy) Club Italia
9	Francesco Recine C	7 February 1999	1.86 m (6 ft 1 in)	75 kg (165 lb)	325 cm (128 in)	300 cm (120 in)	(Italy) Club Italia
12	Leandro Ausibio Mosca	5 September 2000	2.08 m (6 ft 10 in)	90 kg (200 lb)	360 cm (140 in)	335 cm (132 in)	(Italy) Club Italia
13	Giovannimaria Gargiulo	1 January 1999	1.97 m (6 ft 6 in)	82 kg (181 lb)	328 cm (129 in)	312 cm (123 in)	(Italy) Materdomini Volley Castellana
14	Diego Cantagalli	13 February 1999	2.01 m (6 ft 7 in)	89 kg (196 lb)	348 cm (137 in)	310 cm (120 in)	(Italy) Cucine Lube Civitanova
15	Kristian Gamba	16 May 2000	1.9 m (6 ft 3 in)	68 kg (150 lb)	335 cm (132 in)	310 cm (120 in)	(Italy) Volley Segrate
18	Lorenzo Sperotto	28 April 1999	1.87 m (6 ft 2 in)	78 kg (172 lb)	320 cm (130 in)	300 cm (120 in)	(Italy) Volley Treviso
19	Daniele Lavia	4 November 1999	2 m (6 ft 7 in)	89 kg (196 lb)	345 cm (136 in)	316 cm (124 in)	(Italy) Porto Robur

== South Korea ==
The following is the South Korean roster in the 2019 FIVB Volleyball Men's U21 World Championship.

Head coach: Kyungsuk Lee

No.	Name	Date of birth	Height	Weight	Spike	Block	2019 club
1	Donghyeok Im C	9 March 1999	1.99 m (6 ft 6 in)	86 kg (190 lb)	320 cm (130 in)	300 cm (120 in)	(South Korea) Korean Airlines
4	Sungchan Cho	7 February 1999	1.82 m (6 ft 0 in)	75 kg (165 lb)	300 cm (120 in)	300 cm (120 in)	(South Korea) Hongik University
5	Hanyong Joung	31 July 2001	1.94 m (6 ft 4 in)	91 kg (201 lb)	310 cm (120 in)	295 cm (116 in)	(South Korea) Jecheon Industrial Highschool
6	Woojin Kim	13 August 2000	1.9 m (6 ft 3 in)	75 kg (165 lb)	310 cm (120 in)	295 cm (116 in)	(South Korea) Kyunghee University
7	Jihan Kim	16 September 1999	1.94 m (6 ft 4 in)	79 kg (174 lb)	320 cm (130 in)	310 cm (120 in)	(South Korea) Hyundai Capital
9	Huijun Yang	13 June 1999	2.01 m (6 ft 7 in)	85 kg (187 lb)	310 cm (120 in)	300 cm (120 in)	(South Korea) Hanyang University
10	Wanjong Kim	1 September 1999	1.95 m (6 ft 5 in)	85 kg (187 lb)	300 cm (120 in)	290 cm (110 in)	(South Korea) Joongbu University
11	Sunho Kim	18 January 1999	1.88 m (6 ft 2 in)	80 kg (180 lb)	310 cm (120 in)	295 cm (116 in)	(South Korea) Hanyang University
12	Sungjin Lim	11 January 1999	1.95 m (6 ft 5 in)	80 kg (180 lb)	300 cm (120 in)	290 cm (110 in)	(South Korea) Sungkyunkwan University
15	Yechan Park	27 May 2002	1.99 m (6 ft 6 in)	80 kg (180 lb)	320 cm (130 in)	295 cm (116 in)	(South Korea) Susung Highschool
19	Taeseong Park	9 April 2001	1.87 m (6 ft 2 in)	68 kg (150 lb)	310 cm (120 in)	285 cm (112 in)	(South Korea) Okchun Highschool
20	Seunghun Shin	5 May 2000	1.94 m (6 ft 4 in)	89 kg (196 lb)	280 cm (110 in)	280 cm (110 in)	(South Korea) Kyunghee University

== Morocco ==
The following is the Moroccan roster in the 2019 FIVB Volleyball Men's U21 World Championship.

Head coach: Khalid Berma

No.	Name	Date of birth	Height	Weight	Spike	Block	2019 club
1	Oussama Elazhari C	9 April 1999	1.95 m (6 ft 5 in)	82 kg (181 lb)	340 cm (130 in)	325 cm (128 in)	(Morocco) AS FAR
4	Marouane Samih	24 June 1999	2 m (6 ft 7 in)	79 kg (174 lb)	330 cm (130 in)	320 cm (130 in)	(Morocco) TSC CASABLANCA
5	Hamza Ouyachi	16 July 2000	2.05 m (6 ft 9 in)	83 kg (183 lb)	340 cm (130 in)	335 cm (132 in)	(Morocco) OCY YOUSSOFIA
6	Soufiyan Hazzaoui	17 February 1999	1.88 m (6 ft 2 in)	70 kg (150 lb)	316 cm (124 in)	310 cm (120 in)	(Morocco) IZK khemisset
7	Mohcne Souiti	28 July 1999	1.87 m (6 ft 2 in)	73 kg (161 lb)	328 cm (129 in)	322 cm (127 in)	(Morocco) RCOZ oued zem
8	Ilyas Rhouni Lazaar	14 April 2000	1.93 m (6 ft 4 in)	82 kg (181 lb)	337 cm (133 in)	325 cm (128 in)	(Morocco) OCS volley ball
9	Issam El Bakhir	19 January 2000	2.05 m (6 ft 9 in)	95 kg (209 lb)	335 cm (132 in)	330 cm (130 in)	(Morocco) ASL laarach
10	Youssef Marfouk	15 September 1999	1.78 m (5 ft 10 in)	66 kg (146 lb)	306 cm (120 in)	296 cm (117 in)	(Morocco) AMDS CASABLANCA
11	Anass Saber	22 April 1999	2.04 m (6 ft 8 in)	98 kg (216 lb)	340 cm (130 in)	335 cm (132 in)	(Morocco) FUS RABAT
12	Nourddine Khiati	13 October 2001	1.78 m (5 ft 10 in)	64 kg (141 lb)	305 cm (120 in)	297 cm (117 in)	(Morocco) AOSF FIGUIG
14	Mohamed Amine Ben Massaoud	20 January 2000	1.87 m (6 ft 2 in)	68 kg (150 lb)	315 cm (124 in)	312 cm (123 in)	(Morocco) AOSF FIGUIG
16	Bilal Zbakh	21 January 1999	1.95 m (6 ft 5 in)	74 kg (163 lb)	333 cm (131 in)	298 cm (117 in)	(Morocco) OCY YOUSSOFI

== Poland ==
The following is the Polish roster in the 2019 FIVB Volleyball Men's U21 World Championship.

Head coach: Michał Bąkiewicz

No.	Name	Date of birth	Height	Weight	Spike	Block	2019 club
1	Wiktor Rajsner	13 April 1999	2.05 m (6 ft 9 in)	91 kg (201 lb)	346 cm (136 in)	320 cm (130 in)	(Poland) BKS Chemik Bydgoszcz
3	Wiktor Nowak	21 May 1999	1.86 m (6 ft 1 in)	78 kg (172 lb)	325 cm (128 in)	310 cm (120 in)	
6	Kamil Kosiba	22 February 1999	1.98 m (6 ft 6 in)	93 kg (205 lb)	341 cm (134 in)	314 cm (124 in)	(Poland) AKS Rzeszow
8	Jakub Czerwiński	22 July 2001	1.93 m (6 ft 4 in)	87 kg (192 lb)	340 cm (130 in)	317 cm (125 in)	(Poland) NTS 3 Nakłp
9	Bartłomiej Zawalski	13 February 1999	2.04 m (6 ft 8 in)	95 kg (209 lb)	347 cm (137 in)	326 cm (128 in)	(Poland) Cuprum Lubin
10	Remigiusz Kapica	28 September 2000	2 m (6 ft 7 in)	94 kg (207 lb)	343 cm (135 in)	318 cm (125 in)	(Poland) AZS Czestochowa
11	Rafal Prokopczuk	23 March 1999	1.87 m (6 ft 2 in)	80 kg (180 lb)	335 cm (132 in)	320 cm (130 in)	(Poland) MOS WOLA Warszawa
12	Mateusz Janikowski	5 May 1999	2 m (6 ft 7 in)	96 kg (212 lb)	344 cm (135 in)	315 cm (124 in)	(Poland) ONICO Warszawa
16	Mateusz Poręba C	24 August 1999	2.03 m (6 ft 8 in)	100 kg (220 lb)	347 cm (137 in)	312 cm (123 in)	(Poland) AKS Rzeszow
17	Bartosz Firszt	19 March 1999	1.98 m (6 ft 6 in)	88 kg (194 lb)	332 cm (131 in)	314 cm (124 in)	(Poland) METRO Warszawa
18	Filip Grygiel	12 February 2000	2 m (6 ft 7 in)	95 kg (209 lb)	344 cm (135 in)	315 cm (124 in)	(Poland) SK Gornik Radlin
20	Kamil Szymura	24 January 1999	1.84 m (6 ft 0 in)	78 kg (172 lb)	319 cm (126 in)	294 cm (116 in)	(Poland) AZS Czestochowa

== Puerto Rico ==
The following is the Puerto Rican roster in the 2019 FIVB Volleyball Men's U21 World Championship.

Head coach: Francisco Negron

No.	Name	Date of birth	Height	Weight	Spike	Block	2019 club
2	Pedro Molina C	7 April 1999	1.92 m (6 ft 4 in)	81 kg (179 lb)	246 cm (97 in)	239 cm (94 in)	(Puerto Rico) National Team
3	Christian Hernandez Negron	7 June 2000	1.88 m (6 ft 2 in)	82 kg (181 lb)	245 cm (96 in)	240 cm (94 in)	(Puerto Rico) National Team
5	Sebastian Negron	15 February 2001	1.91 m (6 ft 3 in)	72 kg (159 lb)	246 cm (97 in)	242 cm (95 in)	(Puerto Rico) National Team
6	Roque Nido Alvarez	8 December 1999	1.86 m (6 ft 1 in)	83 kg (183 lb)	248 cm (98 in)	242 cm (95 in)	(Puerto Rico) National Team
8	Diego Rosich Oliver	28 February 2002	1.93 m (6 ft 4 in)	88 kg (194 lb)	256 cm (101 in)	249 cm (98 in)	(Puerto Rico) National Team
9	Johan Leon	12 May 1999	1.93 m (6 ft 4 in)	82 kg (181 lb)	245 cm (96 in)	239 cm (94 in)	(Puerto Rico) National Team
11	Antonio Elias Rodriguez	15 September 2000	1.93 m (6 ft 4 in)	81 kg (179 lb)	256 cm (101 in)	252 cm (99 in)	(Puerto Rico) National Team
12	Darryel Maldonado Quintana	27 September 1999	1.88 m (6 ft 2 in)	68 kg (150 lb)	252 cm (99 in)	246 cm (97 in)	(Puerto Rico) National Team
13	Francisco Pomar Dominguez	2 April 2000	1.86 m (6 ft 1 in)	66 kg (146 lb)	245 cm (96 in)	239 cm (94 in)	(Puerto Rico) National Team
14	Jovany Miguel Torres	8 June 1999	1.88 m (6 ft 2 in)	85 kg (187 lb)	254 cm (100 in)	253 cm (100 in)	(Puerto Rico) National Team
16	Willy Varela Diaz	12 March 1999	1.78 m (5 ft 10 in)	66 kg (146 lb)	248 cm (98 in)	244 cm (96 in)	(Puerto Rico) National Team

== Russia ==
The following is the Russian roster in the 2019 FIVB Volleyball Men's U21 World Championship.

Head coach: Andrey Nozdrin

No.	Name	Date of birth	Height	Weight	Spike	Block	2019 club
1	Ivan Kuznetcov	13 November 1999	2.01 m (6 ft 7 in)	88 kg (194 lb)	340 cm (130 in)	330 cm (130 in)	(Russia) Belogorie
2	Vitalii Dikarev	13 November 1999	2.08 m (6 ft 10 in)	95 kg (209 lb)	340 cm (130 in)	330 cm (130 in)	(Russia) Fakel NOVY URENGOY
3	Alexander Zakhvatenkov	26 December 1999	2.05 m (6 ft 9 in)	90 kg (200 lb)	340 cm (130 in)	330 cm (130 in)	(Russia) Belogorie
4	Artem Melnikov	28 June 1999	2.04 m (6 ft 8 in)	92 kg (203 lb)	340 cm (130 in)	330 cm (130 in)	(Russia) DINAMO-LO
5	Konstantin Abaev C	17 June 1999	1.92 m (6 ft 4 in)	82 kg (181 lb)	320 cm (130 in)	310 cm (120 in)	(Russia) LOKOMOTIV
7	Egor Sidenko	7 September 1999	1.98 m (6 ft 6 in)	86 kg (190 lb)	350 cm (140 in)	340 cm (130 in)	(Russia) Belogorie BELGOROD
8	Pavel Tetyukhin	22 October 2000	1.88 m (6 ft 2 in)	75 kg (165 lb)	310 cm (120 in)	300 cm (120 in)	(Russia) Belogorie
12	Maksim Sapozhkov	15 November 2000	2.1 m (6 ft 11 in)	97 kg (214 lb)	340 cm (130 in)	330 cm (130 in)	(Russia) Lokomotiv
14	Egor Krechetov	17 August 1999	1.88 m (6 ft 2 in)	79 kg (174 lb)	310 cm (120 in)	300 cm (120 in)	(Russia) VC Kuzbass
17	Denis Golubev	7 March 2000	1.83 m (6 ft 0 in)	73 kg (161 lb)	310 cm (120 in)	300 cm (120 in)	(Russia) Lokomotiv NOVOSIBIRSK
19	Anatolii Volodin	2 July 1999	1.91 m (6 ft 3 in)	85 kg (187 lb)	338 cm (133 in)	321 cm (126 in)	(Russia) Fakel NOVY URENGOY
20	Viktor Pivovarov	22 August 1999	1.99 m (6 ft 6 in)	87 kg (192 lb)	350 cm (140 in)	340 cm (130 in)	(Russia) Ural

== Tunisia ==
The following is the Tunisian roster in the 2019 FIVB Volleyball Men's U21 World Championship.

Head coach: Amine Basdouri

No.	Name	Date of birth	Height	Weight	Spike	Block	2019 club
1	Sofien Chaaben	4 February 1999	1.95 m (6 ft 5 in)	83 kg (183 lb)	325 cm (128 in)	302 cm (119 in)	(Tunisia) C S Sfaxien
2	Khaled Langliz	9 January 1999	1.92 m (6 ft 4 in)	73 kg (161 lb)	305 cm (120 in)	287 cm (113 in)	(Tunisia) C O Kélibia
3	Ghaith Hmaied	30 August 1999	1.97 m (6 ft 6 in)	71 kg (157 lb)	311 cm (122 in)	298 cm (117 in)	(Tunisia) C O Kélibia
8	Salem Naffeti	15 October 1999	1.92 m (6 ft 4 in)	80 kg (180 lb)	312 cm (123 in)	298 cm (117 in)	(Tunisia) U S T Sfax
9	Yassine Abdelhedi	28 October 1999	2.06 m (6 ft 9 in)	75 kg (165 lb)	327 cm (129 in)	301 cm (119 in)	(Tunisia) C S Sfaxien
10	Elyes Bouachir	27 October 2001	1.96 m (6 ft 5 in)	85 kg (187 lb)	348 cm (137 in)	310 cm (120 in)	(Tunisia) S.S.B.Said
12	Ala Hammami	13 July 2000	2.52 m (8 ft 3 in)	74 kg (163 lb)	320 cm (130 in)	305 cm (120 in)	(Tunisia) C.O.KELIBIA
13	Hedi Khazri	28 February 2000	1.9 m (6 ft 3 in)	75 kg (165 lb)	315 cm (124 in)	295 cm (116 in)	(Tunisia) A S Marsa
14	Yacine Ridene	30 April 1999	2 m (6 ft 7 in)	90 kg (200 lb)	305 cm (120 in)	284 cm (112 in)	(Tunisia) F H Ghezez
17	Ghassen Zgarni	14 May 2000	1.98 m (6 ft 6 in)	78 kg (172 lb)	320 cm (130 in)	300 cm (120 in)	(Tunisia) C O Kélibia
18	Hamdi Ben Taleb C	1 January 1999	1.88 m (6 ft 2 in)	70 kg (150 lb)	315 cm (124 in)	295 cm (116 in)	(Tunisia) A S Hawaria
20	Mohamed Amine Toubib	14 May 1999	1.85 m (6 ft 1 in)	80 kg (180 lb)	315 cm (124 in)	297 cm (117 in)	(Tunisia) A S Hawari
