= Bangladesh men's national under-21 volleyball team =

Bangladesh national volleyball team

Bangladesh Under-21
- Association: Bangladesh Volleyball Federation
- Confederation: AVC
- Head coach: Md Samir Islam Khan

Uniforms
| Home | Away |

FIVB U21 World Championship
- Appearances: None

Asian U20 Championship
- Appearances: None

The Bangladesh men's national under-21 volleyball team represents Bangladesh in men's under-21 volleyball events, it is controlled and managed by the Bangladesh Volleyball Federation that is a member of Asian volleyball body Asian Volleyball Confederation (AVC) and the international volleyball body government the Fédération Internationale de Volleyball (FIVB).

== Competitions history ==
=== FIVB U-21 World Championship ===
Champions Runners up Third place Fourth place

FIVB U-21 World Championship records
| Year | Round | Position | Pld | W | L | SW | SL | Squad |
|---|---|---|---|---|---|---|---|---|
| (Brazil) 1977 | Did not qualify | | | | | | | |
| (United States) 1981 | Did not qualify | | | | | | | |
| (Italy) 1985 | Did not qualify | | | | | | | |
| (Bahrain) 1987 | Did not qualify | | | | | | | |
| (Greece) 1989 | Did not qualify | | | | | | | |
| (Egypt) 1991 | Did not qualify | | | | | | | |
| (Argentina) 1993 | Did not qualify | | | | | | | |
| (Malaysia) 1995 | Did not qualify | | | | | | | |
| (Bahrain) 1997 | Did not qualify | | | | | | | |
| (Thailand) 1999 | Did not qualify | | | | | | | |
| (Poland) 2001 | Did not qualify | | | | | | | |
| (Iran) 2003 | Did not qualify | | | | | | | |
| (India) 2005 | Did not qualify | | | | | | | |
| (Morocco) 2007 | Did not qualify | | | | | | | |
| (India) 2009 | Did not qualify | | | | | | | |
| (Brazil) 2011 | Did not qualify | | | | | | | |
| (Turkey) 2013 | Did not qualify | | | | | | | |
| (Mexico) 2015 | Did not qualify | | | | | | | |
| (Czech Republic) 2017 | Did not qualify | | | | | | | |
| (Bahrain) 2019 | Did not qualify | | | | | | | |
| (Italy) (Bulgaria) 2021 | Did not qualify | | | | | | | |
| (Bahrain) 2023 | Did not qualify | | | | | | | |
| 2025 | Did not qualify | | | | | | | |
| Total | 0 Titles | 0/23 | 0 | 0 | 0 | 0 | 0 | |

=== Asian Under-20 Championship ===
Champions Runners up Third place Fourth place

Asian U-20 Championship
| Year | Round | Position | Pld | W | L | SW | SL |
|---|---|---|---|---|---|---|---|
| (South Korea) 1982 | Did not participate | | | | | | |
| (Saudi Arabia) 1984 | Did not participate | | | | | | |
| (Thailand) 1986 | Did not participate | | | | | | |
| (Indonesia) 1988 | Did not participate | | | | | | |
| (Thailand) 1990 | Did not participate | | | | | | |
| (Iran) 1992 | Did not participate | | | | | | |
| (Qatar) 1994 | Did not participate | | | | | | |
| (Vietnam) 1996 | Did not participate | | | | | | |
| (Iran) 1998 | Did not participate | | | | | | |
| (Iran) 2000 | Did not participate | | | | | | |
| (Iran) 2002 | Did not participate | | | | | | |
| (Qatar) 2004 | Did not participate | | | | | | |
| (Iran) 2006 | Did not participate | | | | | | |
| (Iran) 2008 | Did not participate | | | | | | |
| (Thailand) 2010 | Did not participate | | | | | | |
| (Iran) 2012 | Did not participate | | | | | | |
| (Bahrain) 2014 | Did not participate | | | | | | |
| (Taiwan) 2016 | Did not participate | | | | | | |
| (Bahrain) 2018 | Did not participate | | | | | | |
| (Bahrain) 2022 | Quarter-finals | 5th place | 5 | 3 | 2 | 11 | 11 |
| (Indonesia) 2024 | Final round | 14th place | 8 | 3 | 5 | 13 | 15 |
| Total | 0 Title | 2/21 | 13 | 6 | 7 | 24 | 26 |
