= Erfan Norouzi =

Iranian volleyball player (born 2003)

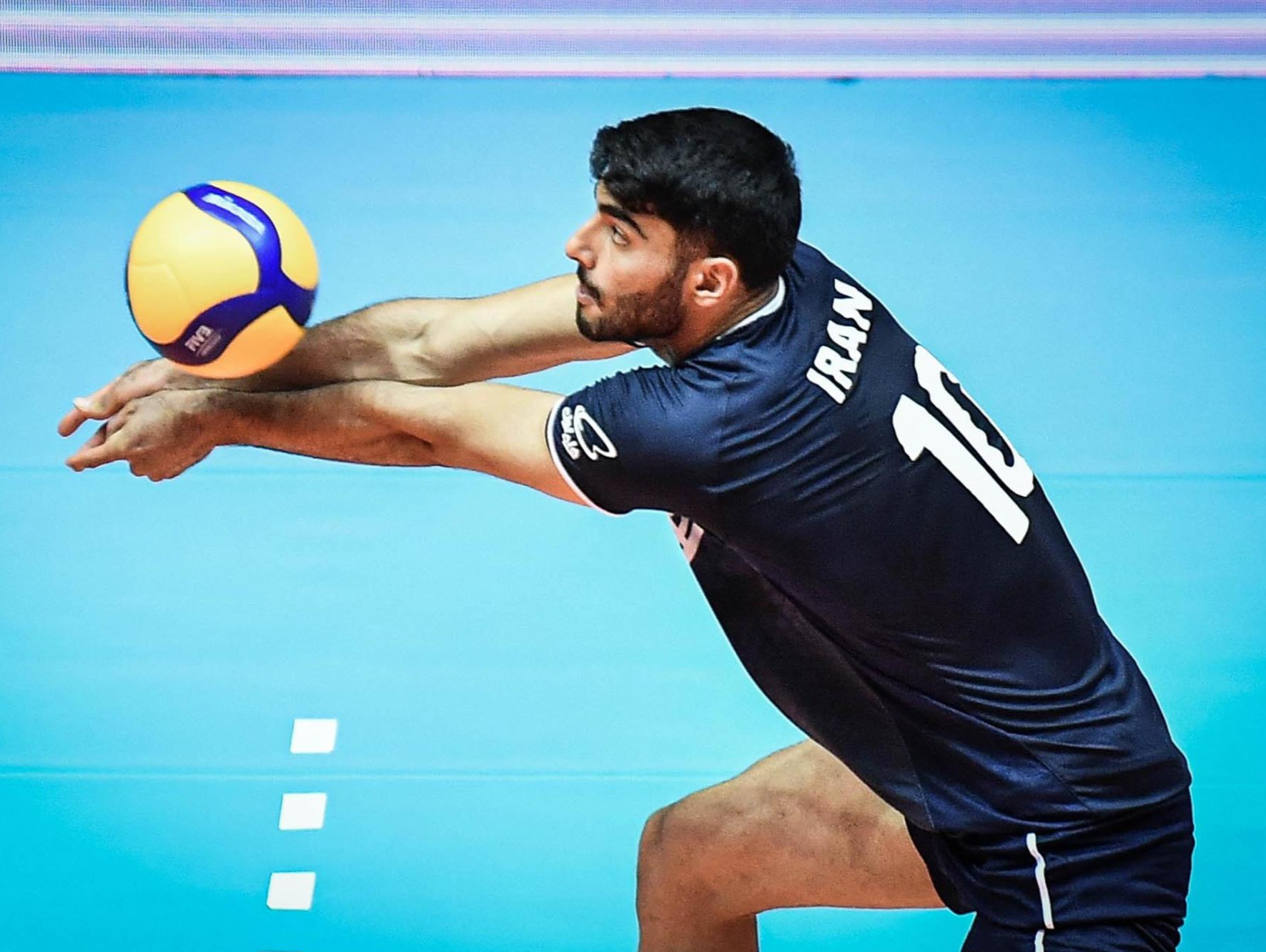
- Erfan Norouzi in 2022

Personal information
- Full name: Erfan Norouzi
- Nationality: Iranian
- Born: 12 July 2003 (age 23); Amol, Mazandaran, Iran
- Height: 2.02 m (6 ft 8 in)
- Weight: 97 kg (214 lb)
- Spike: 356 cm (140 in)
- Block: 345 cm (136 in)

Volleyball information
- Position: Middle blocker
- Current club: -

Career
Years	Teams
2019–2023; 2023; 2023-2024; 2024-2025	(Iran) Haraz Amol (Iran) Chadormalu (Iran) Shahdab Yazd (Iran) Saipa

National team
2021–2022; 2022–	Iran U19; Iran U21
Honours
Men's volleyball
Representing Iran
FIVB U19 World Championship
Bronze medal – third place	2021 Tehran
U20 Asian Championship
Gold medal – first place	2022 Riffa
FIVB U21 World Championship
Gold medal – first place	2023 Manama	Team

Erfan Norouzi (born on July 12, 2003, in Amol) is a volleyball player from Iran. Norouzi, who started his professional activity in volleyball at the age of 13, after 4 years of amateur activity in this field and achieving success in the youth age group, he was able to become the champion in the city and provincial competitions and became proud.

Haraz Amol's volleyball team under the head coach of Behrouz Ataei is considered his first team in the Iranian Volleyball Super League.He was invited to the Iran men's national under-21 volleyball team in 2022 and as the captain of this team, he won the gold medal of the Asian Men's U20 Volleyball Championship and won the title of the best middle defense in Asia.

He is now a capitan of Iran men's national under-21 volleyball team. He won the third place in the 2021 World Championships with Iran under-19 national team and won the championship in the 2023 FIVB Volleyball Men's U21 World Championship along with Iran's national youth volleyball team.

== Honors ==
- Runner-up in Iranian Volleyball Super League with the Haraz Amol team
- Bronze medal of 2021 World Championships (Tehran 2021)
- Gold medal of 2022 Asian Men's U20 Volleyball Championship (Riffa 2022)
- Gold medal of 2023 FIVB Volleyball Men's U21 World Championship (Manama 2023)
- Runner-up in 2024 Asian Men's Club Volleyball Championship with the Shahdab Yazd VC
