= 2018 Asian Men's U20 Volleyball Championship =

19th edition of the Asian Men's U20 Volleyball Championship

2018 Asian Men's U20 Championship
Tournament details
- Host country: Bahrain
- City: Riffa
- Dates: 21–28 July
- Teams: 23 (from 1 confederation)
- Venue: 2 (in 1 host city)

Final positions
- Champions: Iran (6th title)
- Runners-up: South Korea
- Third place: Thailand
- Fourth place: Iraq

Tournament awards
- MVP: (Iran) Amirhossein Esfandiar
- Best Setter: (South Korea) Choi Ik-je
- Best OH: (Iran) Morteza Sharifi (Iran) Porya Yali
- Best MB: (Thailand) Soranan Nuampara (Iran) Mehran Feyz
- Best OPP: (Iraq) Ali Sahib Abushanan
- Best Libero: (South Korea) Park Kyeong-min

The 2018 Asian Men's U20 Volleyball Championship was the 19th edition of the Asian Men's U20 Volleyball Championship, a biennial international volleyball tournament organised by the Asian Volleyball Confederation (AVC) with Bahrain Volleyball Association (BVA). The tournament was held in Riffa, Bahrain from 21 to 28 July 2018. The top two teams of the tournament qualified for the 2019 FIVB Volleyball Men's U21 World Championship as the AVC representatives.

Players must be born on or after 1 January 1999. And they can enroll themselves maximum for twice championships.

On 14 December 2020, the AVC announced that the 2020 Asian Men's U20 Volleyball Championship which was originally the AVC qualifier for the 2021 FIVB Volleyball Men's U21 World Championship was canceled due to COVID-19 pandemic and the top two teams of the tournament qualified for the 2021 U21 World Championship as the AVC representatives.

== Qualification ==
The 24 AVC member associations submitted their U20 men's national team to the 2018 Asian U20 Championship. But, Uzbekistan later withdrew. The 23 AVC member associations were from 5 zonal associations, including, Central Asia (7 teams), East Asia (6 teams), Oceania (2 teams), Southeast Asia (2 teams) and West Asia (6 teams).

=== Qualified teams ===
The following teams qualified for the tournament.

Means of qualification	Berths	Qualified
Host country	1	Bahrain
Central Asian teams	7	India
Central Asian teams	7	Iran
Central Asian teams	7	Kazakhstan
Central Asian teams	7	Maldives
Central Asian teams	7	Pakistan
Central Asian teams	7	Sri Lanka
Central Asian teams	7	Turkmenistan
Central Asian teams	7	~~Uzbekistan~~
East Asian teams	6	China
East Asian teams	6	Chinese Taipei
East Asian teams	6	Hong Kong
East Asian teams	6	Japan
East Asian teams	6	South Korea
East Asian teams	6	Macau
Oceanian teams	2	Australia
Oceanian teams	2	New Zealand
Southeast Asian teams	2	Malaysia
Southeast Asian teams	2	Thailand
West Asian teams	5	Iraq
West Asian teams	5	Jordan
West Asian teams	5	Qatar
West Asian teams	5	Saudi Arabia
West Asian teams	5	United Arab Emirates
Total 23

== Pools composition ==
This was the first Asian U20 Championship which used the new competition format. Following the 2017 AVC Board of Administration's unanimous decision, the new format saw teams were drawn into eight pools up to the total amount of the participating teams. Each team as well as the hosts was assigned into a pool according to their final standing of the 2016 edition. As the three best ranked teams were drawn in the same pool A, the next best three contested pool B, the next best three contested pool C. But, Uzbekistan withdrew after the draw. Final standing of the 2016 edition are shown in brackets.

Pool A	Pool B	Pool C	Pool D
China (1)	Japan (4)	Sri Lanka (7)	Qatar (10)
Iran (2)	Thailand (5)	Kazakhstan (8)	Iraq (11)
South Korea (3)	Turkmenistan (6)	Australia (9)	Bahrain (Hosts, 15)

Pool E	Pool F	Pool G	Pool H
Chinese Taipei (12)	Hong Kong (16)	India	Macau
Pakistan (13)	Jordan	New Zealand	Maldives
Saudi Arabia (14)	United Arab Emirates	~~Uzbekistan~~	Malaysia

== Venues ==
- Isa Sports City Hall C, Riffa, Bahrain – Pool A, B, D, E and Final round
- Isa Sports City Hall B, Riffa, Bahrain – Pool C, F, G, H and Final round

== Pool standing procedure ==
1. Number of matches won
2. Match points
3. Sets ratio
4. Points ratio
5. If the tie continues as per the point ratio between two teams, the priority will be given to the team which won the last match between them. When the tie in points ratio is between three or more teams, a new classification of these teams in the terms of points 1, 2 and 3 will be made taking into consideration only the matches in which they were opposed to each other.

Match won 3–0 or 3–1: 3 match points for the winner, 0 match points for the loser
Match won 3–2: 2 match points for the winner, 1 match point for the loser

== Preliminary round ==
- All times are Arabia Standard Time (UTC+03:00).
- Originally, the third ranked team of pool D had to play against the third ranked team of pool G in the playoffs. However, due to the absence of Uzbekistan, there were only two teams in pool G, so the third ranked team of pool D went directly to the round of 16.

=== Pool A ===
Pos	Team	Pld	W	L	Pts	SW	SL	SR	SPW	SPL	SPR	Qualification
1	Iran	2	2	0	6	6	0	MAX	150	119	1.261	Round of 16
2	South Korea	2	1	1	2	3	5	0.600	169	182	0.929	Round of 16
3	China	2	0	2	1	2	6	0.333	164	182	0.901	Round of 16

Date	Time		Score		Set 1	Set 2	Set 3	Set 4	Set 5	Total	Report
21 Jul	16:30	China	0–3	Iran	22–25	13–25	22–25			57–75	P2
22 Jul	14:00	South Korea	3–2	China	25–23	25–22	20–25	22–25	15–12	107–107	P2
23 Jul	14:00	Iran	3–0	South Korea	25–22	25–21	25–19			75–62	P2

=== Pool B ===
Pos	Team	Pld	W	L	Pts	SW	SL	SR	SPW	SPL	SPR	Qualification
1	Japan	2	2	0	6	6	0	MAX	152	96	1.583	Round of 16
2	Thailand	2	1	1	2	3	5	0.600	174	181	0.961	Round of 16
3	Turkmenistan	2	0	2	1	2	6	0.333	139	188	0.739	Round of 16

Date	Time		Score		Set 1	Set 2	Set 3	Set 4	Set 5	Total	Report
21 Jul	14:00	Thailand	0–3	Japan	19–25	17–25	25–27			61–77	P2
22 Jul	16:40	Turkmenistan	2–3	Thailand	20–25	28–26	25–22	21–25	10–15	104–113	P2
23 Jul	11:30	Japan	3–0	Turkmenistan	25–12	25–12	25–11			75–35	P2

=== Pool C ===
Pos	Team	Pld	W	L	Pts	SW	SL	SR	SPW	SPL	SPR	Qualification
1	Sri Lanka	2	2	0	6	6	2	3.000	202	162	1.247	Round of 16
2	Australia	2	1	1	3	4	3	1.333	159	150	1.060	Round of 16
3	Kazakhstan	2	0	2	0	1	6	0.167	128	177	0.723	Playoffs

Date	Time		Score		Set 1	Set 2	Set 3	Set 4	Set 5	Total	Report
21 Jul	19:00	Sri Lanka	3–1	Kazakhstan	23–25	25–16	29–27	25–10		102–78	P2
22 Jul	16:30	Sri Lanka	3–1	Australia	24–26	25–13	26–24	25–21		100–84	P2
23 Jul	19:30	Kazakhstan	0–3	Australia	20–25	22–25	8–25			50–75	P2

=== Pool D ===
Pos	Team	Pld	W	L	Pts	SW	SL	SR	SPW	SPL	SPR	Qualification
1	Bahrain	2	2	0	6	6	0	MAX	153	105	1.457	Playoffs
2	Iraq	2	1	1	3	3	4	0.750	161	156	1.032	Playoffs
3	Qatar	2	0	2	0	1	6	0.167	119	172	0.692	Round of 16

Date	Time		Score		Set 1	Set 2	Set 3	Set 4	Set 5	Total	Report
21 Jul	19:00	Bahrain	3–0	Iraq	25–23	28–26	25–15			78–64	P2
22 Jul	19:30	Qatar	0–3	Bahrain	15–25	16–25	10–25			41–75	P2
23 Jul	16:30	Iraq	3–1	Qatar	25–19	25–16	22–25	25–18		97–78	P2

=== Pool E ===
Pos	Team	Pld	W	L	Pts	SW	SL	SR	SPW	SPL	SPR	Qualification
1	Chinese Taipei	2	2	0	6	6	1	6.000	164	130	1.262	Playoffs
2	Saudi Arabia	2	1	1	3	3	3	1.000	130	137	0.949	Playoffs
3	Pakistan	2	0	2	0	1	6	0.167	137	164	0.835	Playoffs

Date	Time		Score		Set 1	Set 2	Set 3	Set 4	Set 5	Total	Report
21 Jul	11:30	Chinese Taipei	3–0	Saudi Arabia	25–18	25–19	25–18			75–55	P2
22 Jul	11:30	Pakistan	1–3	Chinese Taipei	17–25	15–25	25–14	18–25		75–89	P2
23 Jul	19:00	Saudi Arabia	3–0	Pakistan	25–19	25–22	25–21			75–62	P2

=== Pool F ===
Pos	Team	Pld	W	L	Pts	SW	SL	SR	SPW	SPL	SPR	Qualification
1	Hong Kong	2	2	0	6	6	2	3.000	192	176	1.091	Playoffs
2	Jordan	2	1	1	3	4	3	1.333	174	165	1.055	Playoffs
3	United Arab Emirates	2	0	2	0	1	6	0.167	149	174	0.856	Playoffs

Date	Time		Score		Set 1	Set 2	Set 3	Set 4	Set 5	Total	Report
21 Jul	16:30	Jordan	1–3	Hong Kong	25–20	22–25	24–26	24–26		95–97	P2
22 Jul	19:00	United Arab Emirates	0–3	Jordan	27–29	18–25	23–25			68–79	P2
23 Jul	14:00	Hong Kong	3–1	United Arab Emirates	20–25	25–22	25–20	25–14		95–81	P2

=== Pool G ===
Pos	Team	Pld	W	L	Pts	SW	SL	SR	SPW	SPL	SPR	Qualification
1	India	1	1	0	3	3	0	MAX	75	60	1.250	Playoffs
2	New Zealand	1	0	1	0	0	3	0.000	60	75	0.800	Playoffs

Date	Time		Score		Set 1	Set 2	Set 3	Set 4	Set 5	Total	Report
22 Jul	14:00	New Zealand	0–3	India	22–25	22–25	16–25			60–75	P2

=== Pool H ===
Pos	Team	Pld	W	L	Pts	SW	SL	SR	SPW	SPL	SPR	Qualification
1	Macau	2	2	0	5	6	2	3.000	188	142	1.324	Playoffs
2	Malaysia	2	1	1	4	5	3	1.667	189	151	1.252	Playoffs
3	Maldives	2	0	2	0	0	6	0.000	66	150	0.440	Playoffs

Date	Time		Score		Set 1	Set 2	Set 3	Set 4	Set 5	Total	Report
21 Jul	14:00	Maldives	0–3	Malaysia	9–25	19–25	10–25			38–75	P2
22 Jul	11:30	Macau	3–0	Maldives	25–9	25–8	25–11			75–28	P2
23 Jul	16:30	Malaysia	2–3	Macau	28–30	25–20	23–25	25–23	13–15	114–113	P2

== Final round ==
- All times are Arabia Standard Time (UTC+03:00).

Playoffs
24 July
Hong Kong	1
India	3
24 July
Kazakhstan	3
Maldives	0
24 July
Chinese Taipei	3
New Zealand	0
24 July
Pakistan	3
Jordan	0
24 July
Bahrain	3
Malaysia	1
24 July
Saudi Arabia	3
United Arab Emirates	1
24 July
Iraq	3
Macau	0

Round of 16
25 July
Iran	3
India	0
25 July
Sri Lanka	1
Kazakhstan	3
25 July
Japan	2
Chinese Taipei	3
25 July
Thailand	3
Qatar	0
25 July
South Korea	3
Pakistan	1
25 July
Australia	3
Bahrain	2
25 July
China	3
Saudi Arabia	0
25 July
Turkmenistan	0
Iraq	3

Quarterfinals
26 July
Iran	3
Kazakhstan	0
26 July
Chinese Taipei	0
Thailand	3
26 July
South Korea	3
Australia	0
26 July
China	2
Iraq	3

Semifinals
27 July
Iran	3
Thailand	1
27 July
South Korea	3
Iraq	0

Final
28 July
Iran	3
South Korea	0
3rd place match
28 July
Thailand	3
Iraq	1

5th–8th semifinals
27 July
Kazakhstan	0
Chinese Taipei	3
27 July
Australia	0
China	3

5th place match
28 July
Chinese Taipei	1
China	3
7th place match
28 July
Kazakhstan	0
Australia	3

9th–12th semifinals
26 July
Qatar	1
Sri Lanka	3
27 July
Turkmenistan	1
Bahrain	3

9th place match
28 July
Sri Lanka	0
Bahrain	3
11th place match
28 July
Qatar	0
Turkmenistan	3

13th–16th semifinals
26 July
India	0
Japan	3
26 July
Pakistan	3
Saudi Arabia	0

13th place match
27 July
Japan	3
Pakistan	0
15th place match
27 July
India	3
Saudi Arabia	1

17th–20th semifinals
26 July
Hong Kong	2
United Arab Emirates	3
27 July
Jordan	2
New Zealand	3

17th place match
28 July
United Arab Emirates	1
New Zealand	3
19th place match
28 July
Hong Kong	3
Jordan	0

21st–23rd semifinal
26 July
Malaysia	1
Macau	3

21st place match
27 July
Maldives	0
Macau	3

=== Playoffs ===
Date	Time	Venue		Score		Set 1	Set 2	Set 3	Set 4	Set 5	Total	Report
24 Jul	11:30	ISC	Chinese Taipei	3–0	New Zealand	25–19	25–13	25–15			75–47	P2
24 Jul	14:00	ISC	Pakistan	3–0	Jordan	25–20	25–17	25–21			75–58	P2
24 Jul	14:00	ISB	Hong Kong	1–3	India	25–19	24–26	25–27	12–25		86–97	P2
24 Jul	16:30	ISC	Iraq	3–0	Macau	25–18	25–19	25–18			75–55	P2
24 Jul	16:30	ISB	Saudi Arabia	3–1	United Arab Emirates	25–20	22–25	25–16	25–19		97–80	P2
24 Jul	19:00	ISC	Bahrain	3–1	Malaysia	25–27	25–20	25–10	25–21		100–78	P2
24 Jul	19:00	ISB	Kazakhstan	3–0	Maldives	25–16	25–14	25–11			75–41	P2

=== Round of 16 ===
Date	Time	Venue		Score		Set 1	Set 2	Set 3	Set 4	Set 5	Total	Report
25 Jul	11:30	ISC	Iran	3–0	India	25–17	25–14	25–22			75–53	P2
25 Jul	11:30	ISB	South Korea	3–1	Pakistan	25–17	25–22	20–25	25–21		95–85	P2
25 Jul	14:00	ISC	China	3–0	Saudi Arabia	25–22	25–12	25–14			75–48	P2
25 Jul	14:00	ISB	Turkmenistan	0–3	Iraq	16–25	20–25	16–25			52–75	P2
25 Jul	16:30	ISC	Thailand	3–0	Qatar	25–15	25–10	25–10			75–35	P2
25 Jul	16:30	ISB	Japan	2–3	Chinese Taipei	25–22	28–26	18–25	22–25	10–15	103–113	P2
25 Jul	19:00	ISC	Australia	3–2	Bahrain	16–25	17–25	34–32	25–22	15–11	107–115	P2
25 Jul	19:25	ISB	Sri Lanka	1–3	Kazakhstan	24–26	25–16	13–25	21–25		83–92	P2

=== Quarterfinals ===
Date	Time	Venue		Score		Set 1	Set 2	Set 3	Set 4	Set 5	Total	Report
26 Jul	14:00	ISB	Iran	3–0	Kazakhstan	25–13	25–15	25–16			75–44	P2
26 Jul	16:30	ISC	Chinese Taipei	0–3	Thailand	19–25	22–25	26–28			67–78	P2
26 Jul	19:00	ISC	South Korea	3–0	Australia	25–19	25–19	25–18			75–56	P2
26 Jul	19:00	ISB	China	2–3	Iraq	25–17	22–25	25–15	22–25	10–15	104–97	P2

=== 21st–23rd semifinal ===
Date	Time	Venue		Score		Set 1	Set 2	Set 3	Set 4	Set 5	Total	Report
26 Jul	09:00	ISB	Malaysia	1–3	Macau	21–25	17–25	25–23	18–25		81–98	P2

=== 17th–20th semifinals ===
Date	Time	Venue		Score		Set 1	Set 2	Set 3	Set 4	Set 5	Total	Report
26 Jul	16:30	ISB	Hong Kong	2–3	United Arab Emirates	23–25	25–10	20–25	25–15	13–15	106–90	P2
27 Jul	14:00	ISB	Jordan	2–3	New Zealand	16–25	25–18	22–25	25–23	15–17	103–108	P2

=== 13th–16th semifinals ===
Date	Time	Venue		Score		Set 1	Set 2	Set 3	Set 4	Set 5	Total	Report
26 Jul	11:30	ISC	Pakistan	3–0	Saudi Arabia	25–13	25–20	25–18			75–51	P2
26 Jul	11:30	ISB	India	0–3	Japan	19–25	21–25	13–25			53–75	P2

=== 9th–12th semifinals ===
24

Date	Time	Venue		Score		Set 1	Set 2	Set 3	Set 4	Set 5	Total	Report
26 Jul	14:00	ISC	Qatar	1–3	Sri Lanka	21–25	25–21	18–25	24–26		88–97	P2
27 Jul	11:30	ISB	Turkmenistan	1–3	Bahrain	25–23	15–25	13–25	8–25		61–98	P2

=== 5th–8th semifinals ===
Date	Time	Venue		Score		Set 1	Set 2	Set 3	Set 4	Set 5	Total	Report
27 Jul	11:30	ISC	Kazakhstan	0–3	Chinese Taipei	19–25	18–25	21–25			58–75	P2
27 Jul	14:00	ISC	Australia	0–3	China	14–25	19–25	22–25			55–75	P2

=== Semifinals ===
Date	Time	Venue		Score		Set 1	Set 2	Set 3	Set 4	Set 5	Total	Report
27 Jul	16:30	ISC	Iran	3–1	Thailand	25–14	25–18	15–25	25–14		90–71	P2
27 Jul	19:00	ISC	South Korea	3–0	Iraq	25–17	25–16	25–22			75–55	P2

=== 21st place match ===
Date	Time	Venue		Score		Set 1	Set 2	Set 3	Set 4	Set 5	Total	Report
27 Jul	09:00	ISB	Maldives	0–3	Macau	13–25	18–25	22–25			53–75	P2

=== 19th place match ===
Date	Time	Venue		Score		Set 1	Set 2	Set 3	Set 4	Set 5	Total	Report
28 Jul	10:00	ISB	Hong Kong	3–0	Jordan	25–23	25–20	25–20			75–63	P2

=== 17th place match ===
Date	Time	Venue		Score		Set 1	Set 2	Set 3	Set 4	Set 5	Total	Report
28 Jul	12:30	ISB	United Arab Emirates	1–3	New Zealand	25–23	18–25	23–25	22–25		88–98	P2

=== 15th place match ===
Date	Time	Venue		Score		Set 1	Set 2	Set 3	Set 4	Set 5	Total	Report
27 Jul	16:30	ISB	India	3–1	Saudi Arabia	23–25	25–18	25–16	25–17		98–76	P2

=== 13th place match ===
Date	Time	Venue		Score		Set 1	Set 2	Set 3	Set 4	Set 5	Total	Report
27 Jul	19:00	ISB	Japan	3–0	Pakistan	25–21	25–17	25–10			75–48	P2

=== 11th place match ===
Date	Time	Venue		Score		Set 1	Set 2	Set 3	Set 4	Set 5	Total	Report
28 Jul	15:00	ISB	Qatar	0–3	Turkmenistan	20–25	23–25	14–25			57–75	P2

=== 9th place match ===
Date	Time	Venue		Score		Set 1	Set 2	Set 3	Set 4	Set 5	Total	Report
28 Jul	17:30	ISB	Sri Lanka	0–3	Bahrain	21–25	19–25	17–25			57–75	P2

=== 7th place match ===
Date	Time	Venue		Score		Set 1	Set 2	Set 3	Set 4	Set 5	Total	Report
28 Jul	11:30	ISC	Kazakhstan	0–3	Australia	22–25	18–25	23–25			63–75	P2

=== 5th place match ===
Date	Time	Venue		Score		Set 1	Set 2	Set 3	Set 4	Set 5	Total	Report
28 Jul	14:00	ISC	Chinese Taipei	1–3	China	19–25	25–19	20–25	22–25		86–94	P2

=== 3rd place match ===
Date	Time	Venue		Score		Set 1	Set 2	Set 3	Set 4	Set 5	Total	Report
28 Jul	16:30	ISC	Thailand	3–1	Iraq	25–23	18–25	25–20	26–24		94–92	P2

=== Final ===
Date	Time	Venue		Score		Set 1	Set 2	Set 3	Set 4	Set 5	Total	Report
28 Jul	19:05	ISC	Iran	3–0	South Korea	25–22	25–14	25–18			75–54	P2

== Final standing ==
Rank	Team
1st place, gold medalist(s)	Iran
2nd place, silver medalist(s)	South Korea
3rd place, bronze medalist(s)	Thailand
4	Iraq
5	China
6	Chinese Taipei
7	Australia
8	Kazakhstan
9	Bahrain
10	Sri Lanka
11	Turkmenistan
12	Qatar
13	Japan
14	Pakistan
15	India
16	Saudi Arabia
17	New Zealand
18	United Arab Emirates
19	Hong Kong
20	Jordan
21	Macau
22	Maldives
23	Malaysia

Qualified for the 2019 and 2021 U21 World Championship
Qualified for the 2021 U21 World Championship

2018 Asian Men's U20 champions

Iran
6th title

12–man roster
Jelveh, Hazratpour, Saberi, Sharifi, Falahat, Feyz, Gholamipour, Esfandiar (c), Tabari, Beik, Toukhteh, Yali
Head coach
Ataei

== Awards ==
- Most valuable player
  (Iran) Amirhossein Esfandiar
- Best setter
  (South Korea) Choi Ik-je
- Best outside spikers
  (Iran) Morteza Sharifi
  (Iran) Porya Yali
- Best middle blockers
  (Thailand) Soranan Nuampara
  (Iran) Mehran Feyz
- Best opposite spiker
  (Iraq) Ali Sahib Abushanan
- Best libero
  (South Korea) Park Kyeong-min

== See also ==
- 2018 Asian Women's U19 Volleyball Championship
