= Arshia Behnezhad =

Iranian volleyball player (born 2003)

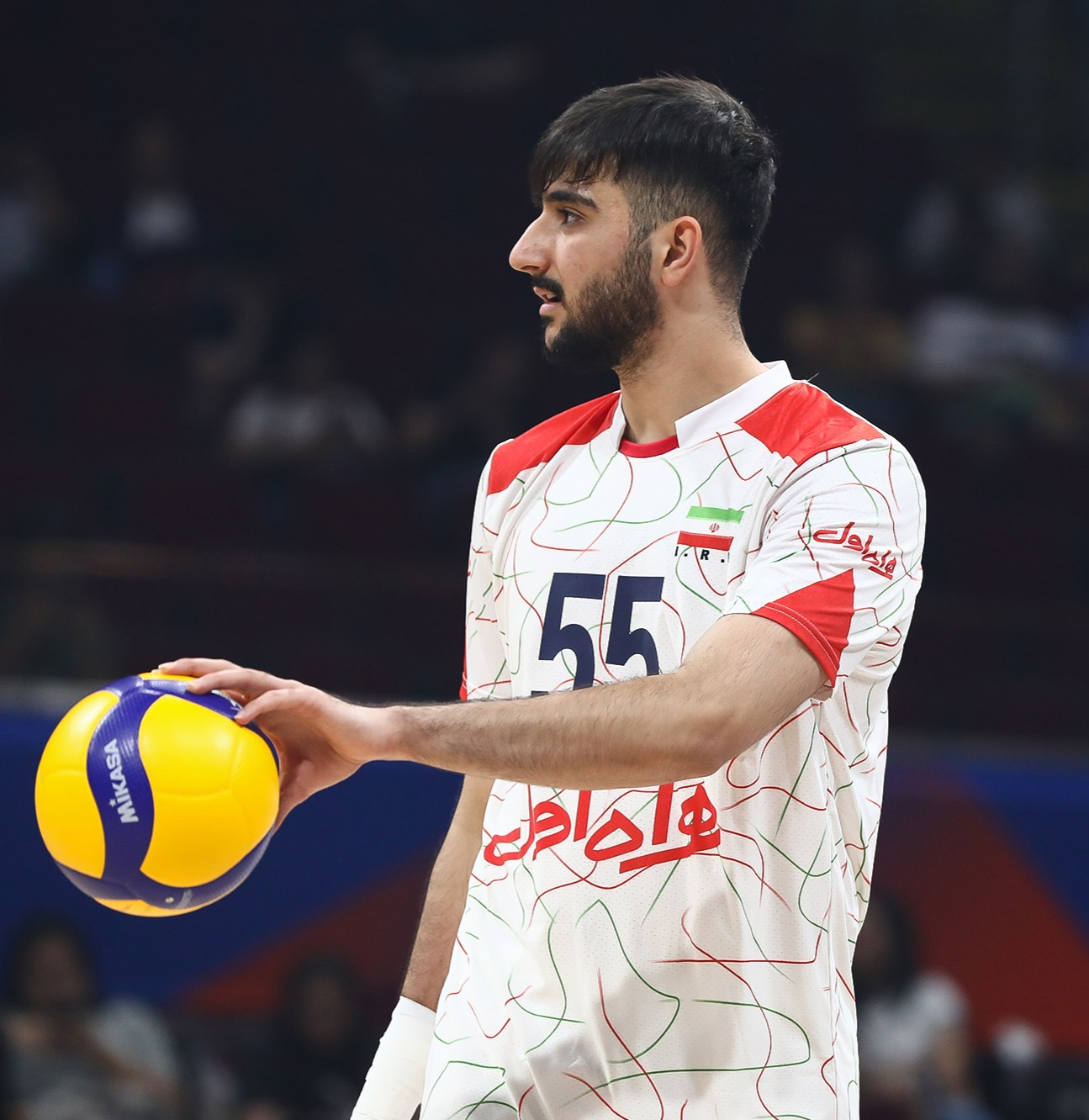
- Arshia Behnezhad in VNL 2024

Personal information
- Nickname: Magic man
- Nationality: Iranian
- Born: 4 August 2003 (age 23) Tehran, Iran
- Height: 2.00 m (6 ft 7 in)
- Weight: 78 kg (172 lb)
- Spike: 363 cm (143 in)
- Block: 336 cm (132 in)

Volleyball information
- Position: Setter
- Current club: Pallavolo Padova
- Number: 15

Career
- Years: Team
- 2022–2024 2024–2025 2025–: (Iran) Saipa Tehran (Iran) Shahrdari Urmia (Iran) Shahdab Yazd (Italy) Pallavolo Padova

National team
- Years: Team
- 2021–2022 2022–2024 2024–: Iran U19; Iran U21; Iran
Honours
Men's volleyball
Representing Iran
FIVB U19 World Championship
Bronze medal – third place	2021 Tehran
U20 Asian Championship
Gold medal – first place	2022 Riffa
Solidarity Games
Gold medal – first place	2025	Team
Asian Men's Volleyball Championship
Silver medal – second place	JPN 2026	Team
Asian Games
Gold medal – first place	Nagoya 2026	Team
FIVB U21 World Championship
Gold medal – first place	2023 Manama	Team

Arshia Behnezhad (Persian: عرشیا به‌نژاد; born August 4, 2003, in Tehran) is an Iranian volleyball player. He is now a member of Iran men's national volleyball team. He won the 2022 Asian Championship and the 2023 World Championship with the Iran men's national under-21 volleyball team, and was also recognized as the best Setter of these tournaments. Arshia Be-Nejad, dubbed the "Magic Man" of world volleyball, is one of the best setters in the sport.
