= 2022 Asian Men's U20 Volleyball Championship =

Twenty-first edition of the Asian Men's U20 Volleyball Championship

Tournament details
- Host country: Bahrain
- City: Riffa
- Dates: 22–29 August
- Teams: 17 (from 1 confederation)
- Venue: 2 (in 1 host city)

Final positions
- Champions: Iran (7th title)
- Runners-up: India
- Third place: South Korea
- Fourth place: Thailand

Tournament awards
- MVP: (Iran) Amir Mohammad Golzadeh
- Best Setter: (Iran) Arshia Behnezhad
- Best OH: (South Korea) Lee Yun-soo (Thailand) Kittipong Sangsak
- Best MB: (India) Dushyant Singh (Iran) Erfan Norouzi
- Best OPP: (Iran) Amir Mohammad Golzadeh
- Best Libero: (India) Karthikeyan K

Tournament statistics
- Matches played: 41
- Attendance: 13,470 (329 per match)

The 2022 Asian Men's U20 Volleyball Championship was the 21st edition of the Asian Men's U20 Volleyball Championship, a biennial international volleyball tournament organised by the Asian Volleyball Confederation (AVC) with Bahrain Volleyball Association (BVA). The tournament was held in Riffa, Bahrain from 22 to 29 August.

This tournament served as the qualification tournament for the FIVB Volleyball Men's U21 World Championship. The top two teams of the tournament qualified for the 2023 FIVB Volleyball Men's U21 World Championship as the AVC representatives.

Players must be born on or after January 1, 2003. Players who had played twice in the FIVB Junior (U20 or U21) Championships cannot play in AVC Junior Championship as it is a qualification event for the following year of FIVB Junior event.

== Qualification ==
The 18 AVC member associations submitted their U20 men's national team to the 2022 Asian U20 Championship. But, Kazakhstan later withdrew. The 17 AVC member associations were from 5 zonal associations, including, Central Asia (4 teams), East Asia (5 teams), Oceania (1 teams), Southeast Asia (1 teams) and West Asia (6 teams).

=== Qualified teams ===
The following teams qualified for the tournament.

Means of qualification	Berths	Qualified
Host Country	1	Bahrain
Central Asian teams	5	Bangladesh
Central Asian teams	5	India
Central Asian teams	5	Iran
Central Asian teams	5	~~Kazakhstan~~
Central Asian teams	5	Pakistan
East Asian teams	5	China
East Asian teams	5	Chinese Taipei
East Asian teams	5	Hong Kong
East Asian teams	5	Japan
East Asian teams	5	South Korea
Oceanian teams	1	Australia
Southeast Asian teams	1	Thailand
West Asian teams	5	Iraq
West Asian teams	5	Kuwait
West Asian teams	5	Qatar
West Asian teams	5	Saudi Arabia
West Asian teams	5	United Arab Emirates
Total 18

== Pools composition ==
Pool A	Pool B	Pool C	Pool D	Pool E	Pool F
Bahrain (Hosts)	Iran (1)	South Korea (2)	Thailand (3)	Iraq (4)	China (5)
Saudi Arabia (16)	Japan (13)	Qatar (12)	~~Kazakhstan~~* (8)	Australia (7)	Chinese Taipei (6)
Hong Kong (19)	India (15)	Kuwait	United Arab Emirates (18)	Bangladesh	Pakistan

* Kazakhstan withdrew from the competition.

== Format ==
Preliminary round: All teams are divided into 6 pools. Robin round to classify ranking. Top 2 teams advance to Classification round of 1st - 12th places. The bottom teams to enter to Classification round of 13th - 18th.

Classification & Final round: Knockout stage. Drawing of lots will be taken to determine the best team of each group's opponent. Winner to advance to quarterfinals. The best team of Pool A and Pool B and their opponents will enter to quarterfinal directly. Teams have faced each other in Preliminary round will not play again in Classification round. The losing teams at knockout stage are subjected to play classification match to determine final ranking.

The drawing of lots for second was scheduled to take place on Wednesday 24 August 2022 at 9pm local time.

== Venues ==
Pool A, B, C	Pool D, E, F
Riffa, Bahrain
Isa Sports City Hall Court 1	Isa Sports City Hall Court 2
Capacity: unknown	Capacity: unknown

== Pool standing procedure ==
1. Number of victories
2. Match points
3. Sets quotient
4. Points quotient
5. If the tie continues as per the point quotient between two teams, the priority will be given to the team which won the last match between them. When the tie in points ratio is between three or more teams, a new classification of these teams in the terms of points 1, 2 and 3 will be made taking into consideration only the matches in which they were opposed to each other.

Match won 3–0 or 3–1: 3 match points for the winner, 0 match points for the loser.
Match won 3–2: 2 match points for the winner, 1 match point for the loser.
Match forfeited: 0 point (25–0;25-0;25-0)

== Preliminary round ==
- All times are Arabia Standard Time (UTC+3:00).

=== Pool A ===
Pos	Team	Pld	W	L	Pts	SW	SL	SR	SPW	SPL	SPR	Qualification
1	Bahrain	2	2	0	6	6	1	6.000	168	142	1.183	Quarterfinals
2	Saudi Arabia	2	1	1	3	4	4	1.000	187	181	1.033	Quarterfinals
3	Hong Kong	2	0	2	0	1	6	0.167	138	170	0.812	13th–16th semifinals

Date	Time	Venue		Score		Set 1	Set 2	Set 3	Set 4	Set 5	Total	Report
22 Aug	19:00	Court 1	Hong Kong	1–3	Saudi Arabia	21–25	25–20	23–25	19–25		88–95	Report
23 Aug	19:00	Court 1	Bahrain	3–0	Hong Kong	25–16	25–18	25–16			75–50	Report
24 Aug	19:00	Court 1	Bahrain	3–1	Saudi Arabia	16–25	27–25	25–22	25–20		93–92	Report

=== Pool B ===
Pos	Team	Pld	W	L	Pts	SW	SL	SR	SPW	SPL	SPR	Qualification
1	Iran	2	2	0	5	6	2	3.000	188	154	1.221	Quarterfinals
2	India	2	1	1	3	3	4	0.750	143	163	0.877	Quarterfinals
3	Japan	2	0	2	1	3	6	0.500	193	207	0.932	13th–16th semifinals

Date	Time	Venue		Score		Set 1	Set 2	Set 3	Set 4	Set 5	Total	Report
22 Aug	14:00	Court 1	Japan	2–3	Iran	25–27	25–23	25–23	22–25	8–15	105–113	Report
23 Aug	16:30	Court 1	India	3–1	Japan	19–25	25–19	25–21	25–23		94–88	Report
24 Aug	14:00	Court 1	Iran	3–0	India	25–20	25–10	25–19			75–49	Report

=== Pool C ===
Pos	Team	Pld	W	L	Pts	SW	SL	SR	SPW	SPL	SPR	Qualification
1	South Korea	2	2	0	6	6	0	MAX	150	96	1.563	1st–12th playoffs
2	Qatar	2	1	1	2	3	5	0.600	157	170	0.924	1st–12th playoffs
3	Kuwait	2	0	2	1	2	6	0.333	140	181	0.773	13th–17th playoffs

Date	Time	Venue		Score		Set 1	Set 2	Set 3	Set 4	Set 5	Total	Report
22 Aug	16:30	Court 1	South Korea	3–0	Qatar	25–10	25–20	25–21			75–51	Report
23 Aug	14:00	Court 1	Kuwait	0–3	South Korea	15–25	13–25	17–25			45–75	Report
24 Aug	16:30	Court 1	Qatar	3–2	Kuwait	25–18	23–25	18–25	25–19	15–8	106–95	Report

=== Pool D ===
Pos	Team	Pld	W	L	Pts	SW	SL	SR	SPW	SPL	SPR	Qualification
1	Thailand	1	1	0	3	3	0	MAX	75	51	1.471	1st–12th playoffs
2	United Arab Emirates	1	0	1	0	0	3	0.000	51	75	0.680	1st–12th playoffs

Date	Time	Venue		Score		Set 1	Set 2	Set 3	Set 4	Set 5	Total	Report
23 Aug	16:30	Court 2	United Arab Emirates	0–3	Thailand	17–25	18–25	16–25			51–75	Report

=== Pool E ===
Pos	Team	Pld	W	L	Pts	SW	SL	SR	SPW	SPL	SPR	Qualification
1	Bangladesh	2	1	1	4	5	4	1.250	197	206	0.956	1st–12th playoffs
2	Iraq	2	1	1	3	4	4	1.000	183	185	0.989	1st–12th playoffs
3	Australia	2	1	1	2	4	5	0.800	206	195	1.056	13th–17th playoffs

Date	Time	Venue		Score		Set 1	Set 2	Set 3	Set 4	Set 5	Total	Report
22 Aug	16:30	Court 2	Iraq	1–3	Bangladesh	25–19	24–26	19–25	22–25		90–95	Report
23 Aug	14:00	Court 2	Australia	1–3	Iraq	20–25	25–18	22–25	23–25		90–93	Report
24 Aug	16:30	Court 2	Bangladesh	2–3	Australia	31–29	18–25	25–22	17–25	11–15	102–116	Report

=== Pool F ===
Pos	Team	Pld	W	L	Pts	SW	SL	SR	SPW	SPL	SPR	Qualification
1	China	2	2	0	6	6	2	3.000	193	166	1.163	1st–12th playoffs
2	Pakistan	2	1	1	2	4	5	0.800	183	192	0.953	1st–12th playoffs
3	Chinese Taipei	2	0	2	1	3	6	0.500	182	200	0.910	13th–16th semifinals

Date	Time	Venue		Score		Set 1	Set 2	Set 3	Set 4	Set 5	Total	Report
22 Aug	19:00	Court 2	China	3–1	Pakistan	25–23	20–25	25–16	25–17		95–81	Report
23 Aug	19:00	Court 2	Chinese Taipei	1–3	China	25–23	22–25	16–25	22–25		85–98	Report
24 Aug	19:00	Court 2	Pakistan	3–2	Chinese Taipei	20–25	17–25	25–19	25–17	15–11	102–97	Report

== Final round ==
- All times are Arabia Standard Time (UTC+3:00).

1st–12th playoffs
26 August
Thailand	3
Iraq	2
26 August
China	3
United Arab Emirates	0
26 August
South Korea	3
Pakistan	1
26 August
Bangladesh	3
Qatar	2

Quarterfinals
26 August
Bahrain	1
India	3
27 August
Thailand	3
China	2
26 August
Iran	3
Saudi Arabia	0
27 August
South Korea	3
Bangladesh	0

Semifinals
28 August
India	3
Thailand	1
28 August
Iran	3
South Korea	1

Final
29 August
India	1
Iran	3
3rd place match
29 August
Thailand	0
South Korea	3

5th place match
28 August
China	2
Bangladesh	3

7th–12th playoffs
27 August
Iraq	3
United Arab Emirates	2
27 August
Pakistan	3
Qatar	0

7th–10th semifinals
28 August
Bahrain	3
Iraq	0
28 August
Saudi Arabia	1
Pakistan	3

7th place match
29 August
Bahrain	3
Pakistan	2
9th place match
29 August
Iraq	1
Saudi Arabia	3

11th place match
28 August
United Arab Emirates	0
Qatar	3

13th–17th playoffs
26 August
Australia	3
Kuwait	1

13th–16th semifinals
27 August
Hong Kong	0
Chinese Taipei	3
27 August
Japan	3
Australia	0

13th place match
28 August
Chinese Taipei	0
Japan	3
15th place match
28 August
Hong Kong	0
Australia	3

=== 13th–17th playoffs ===
Date	Time	Venue		Score		Set 1	Set 2	Set 3	Set 4	Set 5	Total	Report
26 Aug	11:30	Court 2	Australia	3–1	Kuwait	23–25	25–23	25–14	25–18		98–80	Report

=== 1st–12th playoffs ===
Date	Time	Venue		Score		Set 1	Set 2	Set 3	Set 4	Set 5	Total	Report
26 Aug	14:00	Court 1	Bangladesh	3–2	Qatar	20–25	25–19	25–18	23–25	15–9	108–96	Report
26 Aug	16:30	Court 1	South Korea	3–1	Pakistan	23–25	25–21	25–23	25–20		98–89	Report
26 Aug	16:30	Court 2	Thailand	3–2	Iraq	25–21	25–17	23–25	19–25	15–12	107–100	Report
26 Aug	19:00	Court 2	China	3–0	United Arab Emirates	25–20	25–14	25–7			75–41	Report

=== 7th–12th playoffs ===
Date	Time	Venue		Score		Set 1	Set 2	Set 3	Set 4	Set 5	Total	Report
27 Aug	11:30	Court 1	Iraq	3–2	United Arab Emirates	23–25	25–22	23–25	25–17	15–10	111–99	Report
27 Aug	14:00	Court 1	Pakistan	3–0	Qatar	25–19	25–16	27–25			77–60	Report

=== Quarterfinals ===
Date	Time	Venue		Score		Set 1	Set 2	Set 3	Set 4	Set 5	Total	Report
26 Aug	14:00	Court 2	Iran	3–0	Saudi Arabia	25–20	25–15	25–21			75–56	Report
26 Aug	19:00	Court 1	Bahrain	1–3	India	22–25	19–25	28–26	24–26		93–102	Report
27 Aug	16:30	Court 1	Thailand	3–2	China	25–19	20–25	25–22	22–25	15–12	107–103	Report
27 Aug	19:00	Court 1	South Korea	3–0	Bangladesh	25–15	25–13	25–20			75–48	Report

=== 13th–16th semifinals ===
Date	Time	Venue		Score		Set 1	Set 2	Set 3	Set 4	Set 5	Total	Report
27 Aug	16:30	Court 2	Chinese Taipei	3–0	Hong Kong	25–20	25–16	25–17			75–53	Report
27 Aug	19:00	Court 2	Australia	0–3	Japan	21–25	14–25	14–25			49–75	Report

=== 15th place match ===
Date	Time	Venue		Score		Set 1	Set 2	Set 3	Set 4	Set 5	Total	Report
28 Aug	14:00	Court 2	Hong Kong	0–3	Australia	21–25	22–25	20–25			63–75	Report

=== 13th place match ===
Date	Time	Venue		Score		Set 1	Set 2	Set 3	Set 4	Set 5	Total	Report
28 Aug	16:30	Court 2	Chinese Taipei	0–3	Japan	14–25	22–25	22–25			58–75	Report

=== 11th place match ===
Date	Time	Venue		Score		Set 1	Set 2	Set 3	Set 4	Set 5	Total	Report
28 Aug	19:00	Court 2	United Arab Emirates	0–3	Qatar	16–25	21–25	19–25			56–75	Report

=== 7th–10th semifinals ===
Date	Time	Venue		Score		Set 1	Set 2	Set 3	Set 4	Set 5	Total	Report
28 Aug	11:30	Court 1	Bahrain	3–0	Iraq	25–21	25–21	25–17			75–59	Report
28 Aug	11:30	Court 2	Saudi Arabia	1–3	Pakistan	26–28	25–14	24–26	18–25		93–93	Report

=== 9th place match ===
Date	Time	Venue		Score		Set 1	Set 2	Set 3	Set 4	Set 5	Total	Report
29 Aug	11:30	Court 1	Iraq	1–3	Saudi Arabia	19–25	25–11	18–25	18–25		80–86	Report

=== 7th place match ===
Date	Time	Venue		Score		Set 1	Set 2	Set 3	Set 4	Set 5	Total	Report
29 Aug	14:00	Court 1	Bahrain	3–2	Pakistan	22–25	25–18	23–25	25–21	15–12	110–101	Report

=== 5th place match ===
Date	Time	Venue		Score		Set 1	Set 2	Set 3	Set 4	Set 5	Total	Report
28 Aug	14:00	Court 1	China	2–3	Bangladesh	30–32	19–25	25–23	25–22	13–15	112–117	Report

=== Semifinals ===
Date	Time	Venue		Score		Set 1	Set 2	Set 3	Set 4	Set 5	Total	Report
28 Aug	16:30	Court 1	India	3–1	Thailand	25–21	23–25	25–19	25–18		98–83	Report
28 Aug	19:00	Court 1	Iran	3–1	South Korea	25–22	24–26	25–17	25–19		99–84	Report

=== 3rd place match ===
Date	Time	Venue		Score		Set 1	Set 2	Set 3	Set 4	Set 5	Total	Report
29 Aug	16:30	Court 1	Thailand	0–3	South Korea	29–31	16–25	14–25			59–81	Report

=== Final ===
Date	Time	Venue		Score		Set 1	Set 2	Set 3	Set 4	Set 5	Total	Report
29 Aug	19:00	Court 1	India	1–3	Iran	12–25	19–25	25–22	15–25		71–97	Report

== Final standing ==
Rank	Team
1st place, gold medalist(s)	Iran
2nd place, silver medalist(s)	India
3rd place, bronze medalist(s)	South Korea
4	Thailand
5	Bangladesh
6	China
7	Bahrain
8	Pakistan
9	Saudi Arabia
10	Iraq
11	Qatar
12	United Arab Emirates
13	Japan
14	Chinese Taipei
15	Australia
16	Hong Kong
17	Kuwait

Qualified for the 2023 U21 World Championship

2022 Asian Men's U20 champions

Iran
7th title

12–man roster
Sajad Jelodarian, Mahdi Bayati, Porya Hosseinpour, Yousef Kazemi Poshtpari, Younes Javan, Amir Mohammad Golzadeh, Poriya Hossein Khanzadeh, Mohammad Matin Jafari Baghmaleki, Pendar Momeni Moghadam, Erfan Norouzi, Mobin Nasri, Arshia Behnezhad
Head coach
Gholamreza Momeni Moghadam

== Awards ==
- Most valuable player
  Amir Mohammad Golzadeh (IRI)
- Best setter
  Arshia Behnezhad (IRI)
- Best outside spikers
  Lee Yun-soo (KOR)
  Kittipong Sangsak (THA)
- Best middle blockers
  Dushyan Singh (IND)
  Erfan Norouzi (IRI)
- Best opposite spiker
  Amir Mohammad Golzadeh (IRI)
- Best libero
  Karthikeyan K (IND)

== See also ==
- 2022 Asian Women's U20 Volleyball Championship
- 2022 Asian Boys' U18 Volleyball Championship
