= Amir Mohammad Golzadeh =

Iranian volleyball player (born 2003)

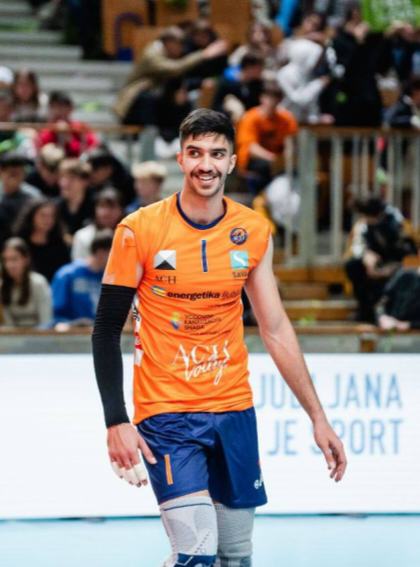
- Amir Mohammad Golzadeh in 2025

Personal information
- Full name: Amir Mohammad Golzadeh
- Nationality: Iranian
- Born: 9 May 2003 (age 23); Karaj, Iran
- Height: 2.05 m (6 ft 9 in)
- Weight: 92 kg (203 lb)
- Spike: 370 cm (146 in)
- Block: 351 cm (138 in)

Volleyball information
- Position: Opposite
- Current club: Yuasa Battery Grottazzolina
- Number: 1

Career
Years	Teams
2021–2024; 2024–2025; 2025–	(Iran) Saipa Tehran (Slovenia) ACH Volley (Italy) Yuasa Battery Grottazzolina

National team
2021–2022; 2022–2024; 2024–	Iran U19; Iran U21; Iran
Honours
Men's volleyball
Representing Iran
FIVB U19 World Championship
Bronze medal – third place	2021 Tehran
U20 Asian Championship
Gold medal – first place	2022 Riffa
FIVB U21 World Championship
Gold medal – first place	2023 Manama	Team

Amir Mohammad Golzadeh (born May 9, 2003, in Karaj) is a volleyball player from Iran. He is now a member of Iran men's national under-21 volleyball team. He won the third place in the 2021 World Under-19 Championship with Iran's Under-19 National Team and won the Championship in the Volleyball Men's U21 World Championship in Bahrain in 2023 with Iran's Under-21 National Volleyball Team. He was recognized as the most valuable player in this tournament.
