= India men's national under-21 volleyball team =

India
- Association: Indian Volleyball Association
- Confederation: AVC
- Head coach: Lakshhminarayana Kirumani Ramaiah

Uniforms
Home

FIVB U21 World Championship
- Appearances: 8 (First in 1981)
- Best result: 4th (2009)

Asian U20 Championship
- Appearances: 20 (First in 1980)
- Best result: (silver) Runners-up (1994, 2022)

The India men's national under-21 volleyball team represents India in men's under-21 volleyball events, it is controlled and managed by the India Volleyball Association, which is a member of the Asian volleyball body Asian Volleyball Confederation (AVC) and the international volleyball body government the Fédération Internationale de Volleyball (FIVB).

== Results ==
=== FIVB U21 World Championship ===
FIVB U21 World Championship
Year	Position
(United States) 1981	11th
(Malaysia) 1995	9th
(Iran) 2003	9th
(India) 2005	9th
(India) 2009	4th
(Brazil) 2011	8th
(Turkey) 2013	8th
(Bahrain) 2023	12th

=== Asian U20 Championship ===
Asian U20 Championship
Year	Position
(South Korea) 1980	3rd place, bronze medalist(s)
(Saudi Arabia) 1984	5th
(Thailand) 1986	9th
(Indonesia) 1988	7th
(Thailand) 1990	11th
(Iran) 1992	7th
(Qatar) 1994	2nd place, silver medalist(s)
(Vietnam) 1996	4th
(Iran) 1998	5th
(Iran) 2000	9th
(Iran) 2002	2nd place, silver medalist(s)
(Qatar) 2004	5th
(Iran) 2006	3rd place, bronze medalist(s)
(Iran) 2008	4th
(Thailand) 2010	3rd place, bronze medalist(s)
(Iran) 2012	4th
(Bahrain) 2014	9th
(Bahrain) 2018	15th
(Bahrain) 2022	2nd place, silver medalist(s)
(Indonesia) 2024	6th

== See also ==
- India men's national volleyball team
