= Behrouz Ataei =

Iranian volleyball coach (born 1970)

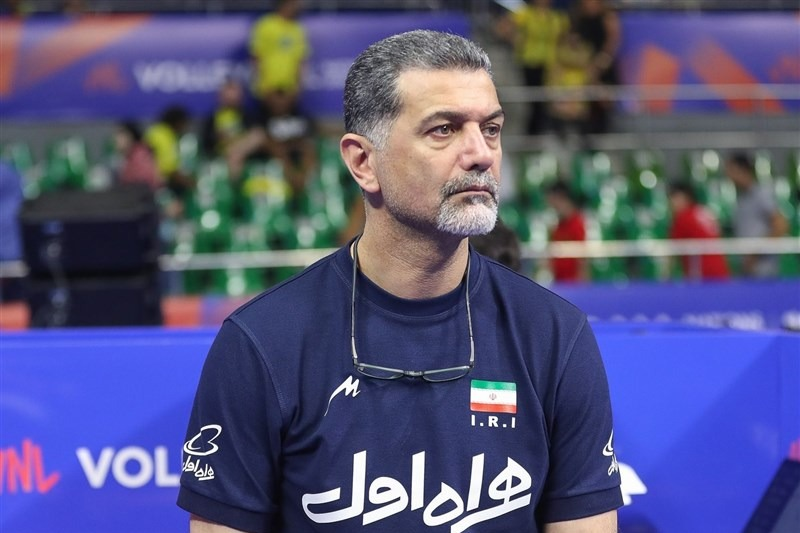
- Behrouz Ataei in 2022

Personal information
- Full name: Behrouz Ataei Nouri
- Nickname: Emperor
- Born: August 5, 1970 (age 56); Amol, Iran
- Height: 195
- Weight: 85
- Spike: 350
- Block: 330

Coaching information
- Current team: Foolad Sirjan
Previous teams coached
Teams
Kalleh Mazandaran; Matin Varamin; Kalleh Mazandaran; Iran U-21; Haraz Amol; Iran U-23; Iran; Foolad Sirjan

Volleyball information
- Position: Head Coach

Career
Years	Teams
1988–1989; 1990; 1991–1992; 1993; 1998–1999; 2002; 2003–2005	Pas Tehran; Janbazan Mazandaran; Fajr Amol; Farmandari Mahabad; Peykan Tehran; Loolehsazi Ahvaz; Persepolis

National team
Iran

Behrouz Ataei (Persian: بهروز عطایی, born August 5, 1970, in Amol, Mazandaran Province) is an Iranian volleyball coach and current manager. He is former head coach of Iran men's national volleyball team He started playing volleyball in 1985, and two years later, for eight consecutive years, he was a member of the national teams of different categories of youth and adults.

Ataei began coaching in 2007 and in 2008 he won the first division league of the country with Kalleh Mazandaran team and brought this team to the Super League. Ataei has been the head coach of the Kalleh team for eleven years. He also led Matin Varamin's volleyball team in 2015 for a year. He became the head coach of the Iranian national youth team in 2017, and this contract was extended in 2019. Ataei inspired Iran to win the 2019 FIVB U21 World Championship for the first time. He returned to the Kalleh team in 2018 and remained the team's head coach until 2020.

== Sporting achievements ==
=== As coach ===
==== National ====
Year	Competition	Host	Team	Role	Rank
2009	Asian Championship	(Philippines) Manila	Iran National Team	Assistant coach	2nd
2010	Asian Games	(China) Guangzhou	Iran National Team	Assistant coach	2nd
2010	AVC Cup	(Iran) Urmia	Iran National Team	Assistant coach	1st
2010	Kazakhstan Presidential Cup	(Kazakhstan) Almaty	Iran National Team	Assistant coach	1st
2010	Men's World Championship	(Italy) Rome	Iran National Team	Assistant coach	19th
2016	Asian Junior's Championship	(Chinese Taipei) Kaohsiung	Iran U21 National Team	Head Coach	2nd
2017	Islamic Solidarity Games	(Azerbaijan) Baku	Iran National Team	Head Coach	1st
2017	U21 World Championship	(Czech Republic) Brno - České Budějovice	Iran U21 National Team	Head Coach	5th
2018	AVC Cup	(Chinese Taipei) Taipei	Iran National Team	Head Coach	2nd
2018	Asian Junior's Championship	(Bahrain) Riffa	Iran U21 National Team	Head Coach	1st
2019	U21 World Championship	(Bahrain) Riffa	Iran U21 National Team	Head Coach	1st
2021	Asian Championship	(Japan) Chiba - Funabashi	Iran National Team	Head coach	1st

==== Club (International Tournaments) ====
Year	Competition	Host	Team	Role	Rank
2012	Asian Club Championship	(China) Shanghai	Kalleh Mazandaran	Head Coach	3rd
2013	Asian Club Championship	(Iran) Tehran	Kalleh Mazandaran	Head Coach	1st
2013	Men's Club World Championship	(Brazil) Betim	Kalleh Mazandaran	Head Coach	7th

==== Club (Iranian Super League) ====
Season	Team	Role	Rank
2009–10	Kalleh Mazandaran	Head Coach	3rd
2010–11	Kalleh Mazandaran	Head Coach	3rd
2011–12	Kalleh Mazandaran	Head Coach	1st
2012–13	Kalleh Mazandaran	Head Coach	1st
2013–14	Kalleh Mazandaran	Head Coach	2nd
2018–19	Kalleh Mazandaran	Head Coach	3rd
