= Morteza Sharifi =

Iranian volleyball player (born 1999)

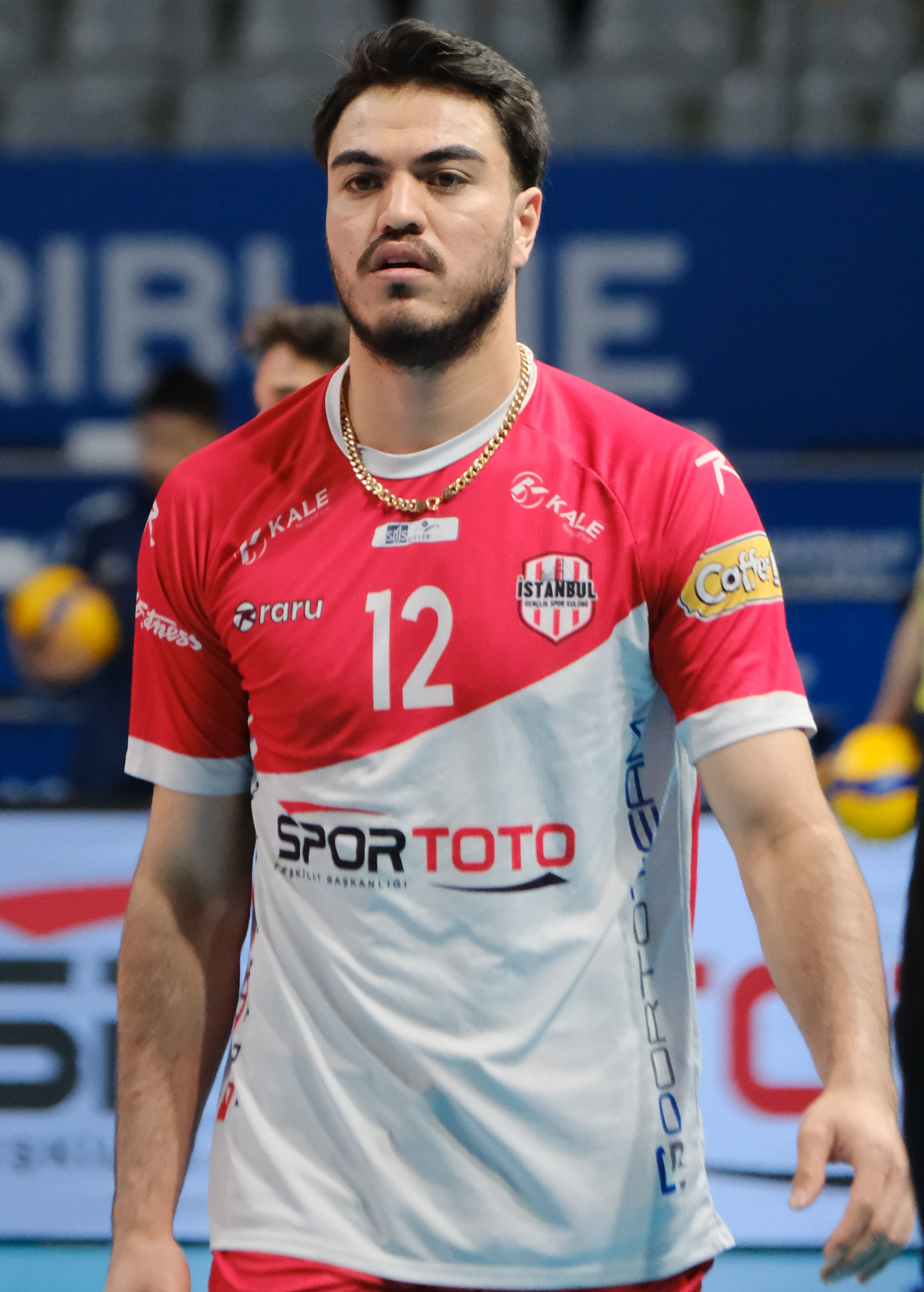

Personal information
- Full name: Morteza Sharifi
- Nickname: Lightning
- Born: May 27, 1999 (age 27); Urmia, Iran
- Height: 1.94 m (6 ft 4 in)
- Weight: 88 kg (194 lb)
- Spike: 3.73 m (147 in)
- Block: 3.55 m (140 in)

Volleyball information
- Position: Outside spiker

Career
Years	Teams
2014–2015; 2015–2016; 2016–2017; 2017–2018; 2018–2019; 2019–2020; 2020; 2020–2021; 2021–2022; 2022–2023	(Iran) Moghavemat Urmia (Iran) Matin Varamin (Iran) Shahrdari Bojnord (Iran) Shahrdari Urmia (Iran) Shams Tehran (Italy) BluVolley Verona (Turkey) Bursa B.B. SK (Iran) Shahrdari Urmia (Turkey) Haliliye Belediye Spor (Turkey) Spor Toto Spor Kulübü (Turkey) Galatasaray

National team
2017; 2018–2019; 2018–	Iran U19; Iran U21; Iran
Honours
Representing Iran
Men's volleyball
Asian Games
Gold medal – first place	2018 Jakarta–Palembang	Team
Gold medal – first place	2026 JPN	Team
Asian Men's Volleyball Championship
Silver medal – second place	JPN 2026	Team
U21 World Championship
Gold medal – first place	2019 Riffa	Team
Asian U20 Championship
Gold medal – first place	2018 Riffa	Team
U19 World Championship
Gold medal – first place	2017 Riffa	Team

Morteza Sharifi (Persian: مرتضی شریفی, born May 27, 1999, in Urmia) is an Iranian volleyball player who plays as an outside spiker for the Iranian national team and Turkish club Galatasaray.

== Club career ==
On 15 August 2022, he signed a one-year contract with Galatasaray, one of the Turkish Men's Volleyball League teams.

== National team career ==
Sharifi in 2018 year invited to Iran senior national team by Igor Kolaković and made his debut match against France in the 2018 Nations League.

== Honours ==
=== National team ===
- Asian Games
  - Gold medal (1): 2018
- U21 World Championship
  - Gold medal (1): 2019
- Asian U20 Championship
  - Gold medal (1): 2018
- U19 World Championship
  - Gold medal (1): 2017

=== Individual ===
- Best outside spiker: 2017 Asian U19 Championship
- Best outside spiker: 2018 Asian U20 Championship
- Best outside spiker: 2019 U21 World Championship
- World fastest spike record: 139 km/h (Iran - France) at 2025 FIVB Men's Volleyball Nations League
