= China men's national under-21 volleyball team =

Youth volleyball team representing China

China
- Association: Chinese Volleyball Association
- Confederation: AVC

Uniforms
Home	Away	Third

FIVB U21 World Championship
- Appearances: 16 (First in 1977)
- Best result: (silver) Runners-Up : (1977)

Asian U20 Championship
- Appearances: 19 (First in 1984)
- Best result: (gold) Champions : (1990, 1996, 2000, 2016).

The China men's national under-21 volleyball team represents China in men's under-21 volleyball events. It is controlled and managed by the Chinese Volleyball Association that is a member of Asian volleyball body Asian Volleyball Confederation (AVC) and the international volleyball body government the Fédération Internationale de Volleyball (FIVB).

== Results ==
=== FIVB U21 World Championship ===
Champions Runners up Third place Fourth place

FIVB U21 World Championship
Year	Round	Position	Squad
(Brazil) 1977		Runners-up	Squad
(United States) 1981		4th place	Squad
(Italy) 1985		7th place	Squad
(Bahrain) 1987		9th place	Squad
(Greece) 1989		8th place	Squad
(Egypt) 1991		9th place	Squad
(Argentina) 1993		9th place	Squad
(Malaysia) 1995		9th place	Squad
(Bahrain) 1997		9th place	Squad
(Thailand) 1999	did not qualify		
(Poland) 2001		13th place	Squad
(Iran) 2003	First round	13th place	Squad
(India) 2005	did not qualify		
(Morocco) 2007	did not qualify		
(India) 2009	Second round	11th place	Squad
(Brazil) 2011	did not qualify		
(Turkey) 2013	Round of 16	15th place	Squad
(Mexico) 2015	Semifinals	3rd place	Squad
(Czech Republic) 2017	Second round	6th place	Squad
(Bahrain) 2019	Second round	6th place	Squad
(Italy) (Bulgaria) 2021	withdrew		
(Bahrain) 2023	did not qualify		
(China) 2025	Second round	8th place	Squad
Total	0 Titles	17/23	—

== Team ==
=== Current squad ===
The following is China roster for the 2025 FIVB Volleyball Men's U21 World Championship.

Head coach: Paweł Woicki

No.	Name	Pos.	Date of birth	Height	2025 club
1	Gao Yuning	MB	16 February 2005	2.03 m (6 ft 8 in)	(China) Jiangsu
2	Sun Qingsong	L	21 January 2006	1.79 m (5 ft 10 in)	(China) Jiangsu
3	Shi Taier	MB	23 January 2006	2.01 m (6 ft 7 in)	(China) Zhejiang
4	Wu Haoze	OH	21 April 2006	1.98 m (6 ft 6 in)	(China) Jiangsu
6	Li Hai	OP	17 November 2005	2.01 m (6 ft 7 in)	(China) Shandong
9	Zeng Yangjie	OH	31 October 2005	1.85 m (6 ft 1 in)	(China) Zhejiang
11	Geng Qi	S	9 May 2005	1.88 m (6 ft 2 in)	(China) Jiangsu
12	Lyu Junpeng	MB	2 January 2006	2.00 m (6 ft 7 in)	(China) Shandong
14	Zhang Zhiqiang	OH	15 February 2006	1.97 m (6 ft 6 in)	(China) Shandong
15	Wang Bohan	OH	20 August 2006	1.95 m (6 ft 5 in)	(China) Shanghai Bright
16	Yao Qian	S	1 November 2006	1.95 m (6 ft 5 in)	(China) Shandong
21	Li Duo	OH	3 May 2005	1.96 m (6 ft 5 in)	(China) Jiangsu
