= 2020 Asian Men's U20 Volleyball Championship =

20th edition of the Asian Men's U20 Volleyball Championship

2020 Asian Men's U20 Championship
Tournament details
- Host country: Canceled (originally Iran)
- City: Canceled (originally Tehran)
- Dates: Canceled (originally 20–27 February 2021)

The 2020 Asian Men's U20 Volleyball Championship was originally to be the 20th edition of the Asian Men's U20 Volleyball Championship, a biennial international volleyball tournament organised by the Asian Volleyball Confederation (AVC) with Islamic Republic of Iran Volleyball Federation (IRIVF).

== History ==
The tournament was scheduled to be held in Tehran, Iran from 20 to 27 February 2021. It was originally scheduled to take place in Isfahan, Iran from 21 to 28 June 2020, but was postponed to 2021 due to the COVID-19 pandemic.

On 14 December 2020, AVC announced that the tournament which was originally the AVC qualifier for the 2021 FIVB Volleyball Men's U21 World Championship was canceled due to COVID-19 pandemic and the top two teams of the 2018 Asian Men's U20 Volleyball Championship qualified for the 2021 U21 World Championship as the AVC representatives.

== See also ==
- 2020 Asian Women's U19 Volleyball Championship
