= Porya Yali =

Iranian volleyball player (born 1999)

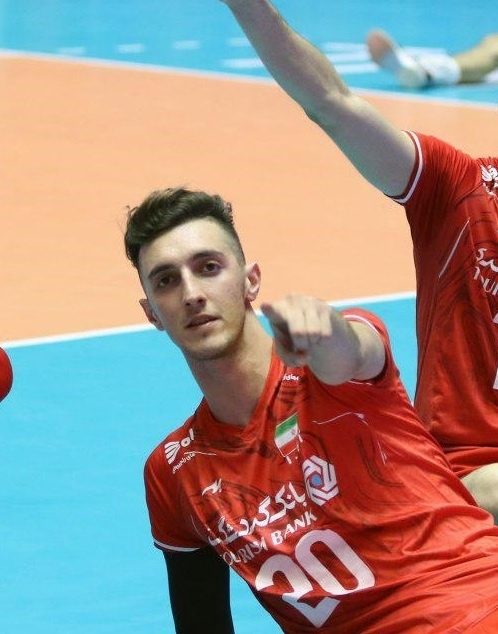

Personal information
- Full name: Porya Yali
- Nationality: Iran
- Born: 21 January 1999 (age 27); Quchan, Iran
- Height: 2.10 m (6 ft 11 in)
- Weight: 81 kg (179 lb)
- Spike: 3.55 m (140 in)
- Block: 3.45 m (136 in)

Volleyball information
- Position: Opposite spiker
- Current club: HIC-Necton Itaquá

Career
Years	Teams
2016–2020; 2020–2021; 2021–2022; 2022–2023; 2023–2024; 2024; 2024–2025; 2025; 2026–	Paykan Tehran; Shahrdari Urmia; Paykan Tehran; Eefaceram Ardakan; Sepehr Sadra; Jakarta Pertamina Pertamax; Sepehr Sadra; Shahrdari Urmia; HIC-Necton Itaquá

National team
2015–2017; 2017–2019; 2018–	Iran U19; Iran U21; Iran
Honours
Men's volleyball
Representing Iran
Asian Championship
Gold medal – first place	2019 Tehran	Team
Asian Cup
Silver medal – second place	2018 Taipei	Team
Islamic Solidarity Games
Gold medal – first place	2021 Konya	Team

Porya Yali (Persian: پوریا یلی; born 21 January 1999 in Quchan) is an Iranian volleyball player who plays as an opposite spiker for the Iranian national team and Brazilian club HIC-Necton Itaquá.

In 2018, Yali was invited to join the Iranian senior national team by Igor Kolaković and made his debut match against Poland in the 2018 Nations League.

== Honours ==
=== National team ===
- Asian Championship
  - Gold medal (1): 2019
- Asian Cup
  - Silver medal (1): 2018
- U21 World Championship
  - Gold medal (1): 2019
- Asian U20 Championship
  - Gold medal (1): 2018
- U19 World Championship
  - Gold medal (1): 2017
  - Bronze medal (1): 2015

=== Individual ===
- Best outside spiker: 2018 Asian U20 Championship
