= Mohammad Reza Hazratpour =

Iranian volleyball player (born 1999)

Mohammadreza Hazratpour
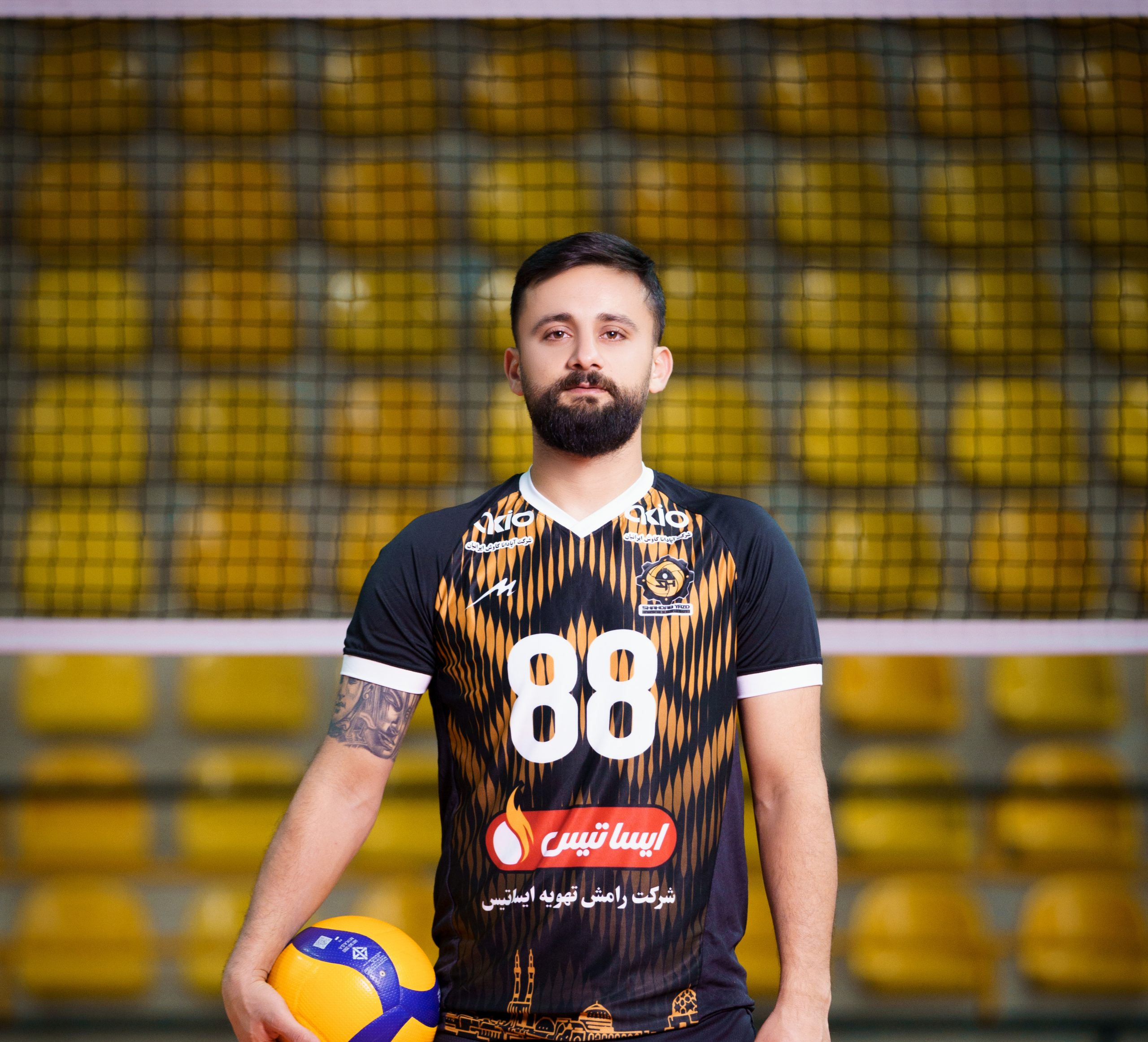

Personal information
- Full name: Mohammadreza Hazratpour Talatappeh
- Born: March 31, 1999 (age 27); Urmia, Iran
- Height: 1.83 m (6 ft 0 in)
- Weight: 87 kg (192 lb)
- Spike: 3.00 m (118 in)
- Block: 2.90 m (114 in)

Volleyball information
- Position: Libero
- Current club: (Iran) Shahrdari Urmia
- Number: 8

Career
| Years | Teams |
|---|---|
| 2018–2019; 2019– | (Iran) Shams Tehran (Iran) Shahrdari Urmia |

National team
| 2018– | Iran U-19; Iran U-23; Iran |
Honours
Representing Iran
Men's volleyball
Asian Games
| Gold medal – first place | 2018 Jakarta–Palembang | Team |
| Gold medal – first place | 2022 Hangzhou | Team |
Asian Championship
| Gold medal – first place | 2019 Iran | Team |
| Gold medal – first place | 2021 Japan | Team |
| Silver medal – second place | 2023 Iran | Team |
| Silver medal – second place | 2026 JPN | Team |
U21 World Championship
| Gold medal – first place | 2019 Bahrain | Team |
U19 World Championship
| Gold medal – first place | 2017 Bahrain | Team |
Asian U20 Championship
| Gold medal – first place | 2018 Bahrain | Team |

Mohammadreza Hazratpour Talatappeh (Persian: محمدرضا حضرت‌پور طلاتپه, born March 31, 1999, in Urmia) is an Iranian volleyball player who plays as a libero for the Iranian national team and Iranian club Shahrdari Urmia.

Hazratpour in 2018 year invited to Iran senior national team by Igor Kolaković and made his debut match against Japan in the 2018 Nations League.

== Honours ==
=== National team ===
| Year | Host | Competition | Rank |
|---|---|---|---|
| 2016 | Serbia | World School Volleyball Championship | Silver |
| 2017 | Bahrain | U19 World Championship | Gold |
| 2019 | Bahrain | U21 World Championship | Gold |
| 2018 | Bahrain | Asian U20 Championship | Gold |
| 2019 | Iran | Asian Championship | Gold |
| 2018 | Indonesia | Asian Games | Gold |
| 2016 | Iran | Iranian U21 Beach Games | Gold |

=== Club ===
| Year | Team | Competition | Rank |
|---|---|---|---|
| 2018–19 | Saipa Tehran | Iranian Super League | Silver |
| 2016–17 | Shahrdari Urmia | Iranian Super League | Bronze |

=== Individual ===
- Best libero: 2019 U21 World Championship
- Best libero: 2021 Asian Championship
- Best libero: 2021 Asian Men's Volleyball Championship

Awards
| Preceded by (Japan) Tomohiro Yamamoto | Best Libero of Asian Men's Championship; 2021 | Succeeded by Incumbent |
