= Amirhossein Esfandiar =

Iranian volleyball player (born 1999)

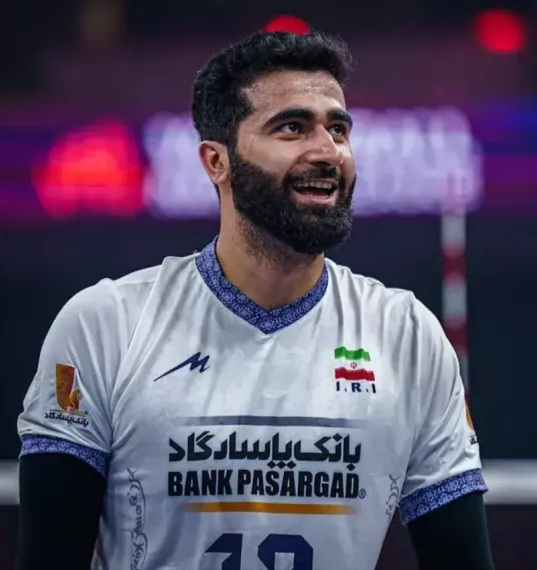
- Esfandiar in VNL 2025

Personal information
- Nationality: (Iran) Iranian
- Born: 24 January 1999 (age 27); Amol, Iran
- Height: 2.10 m (6 ft 11 in)
- Weight: 110 kg (243 lb)
- Spike: 363 cm (143 in)
- Block: 350 cm (138 in)

Volleyball information
- Position: Outside hitter
- Current club: Tianjin Food Group
- Number: 12

Career
Years	Teams
2017–2018; 2018–2020; 2020–2021; 2022–2023; 2023–	Kalleh Mazandaran; Paykan Tehran; Greenyard Maaseik; Ural Ufa; Tianjin Food Group

National team
2018–	Iran
Honours
Men's volleyball
Representing Iran
AVC Asian Championship
Gold medal – first place	2019 Iran
Gold medal – first place	2021 Japan
Asian Games
Gold medal – first place	2022 Hangzhou	Team

Amirhossein Esfandiar (Persian: امیرحسین اسفندیار; born 24 January 1999) is an Iranian professional volleyball player. He is part of the Iranian national team, and a two–time Asian Champion (2019, 2021). At the professional club level, he plays for Tianjin Food Group.

== Sporting achievements ==
=== Clubs ===
- National championships
  - 2020/2021 Belgian Championship, with Greenyard Maaseik

=== Youth national team ===
- 2014 AVC U18 Asian Championship
- 2016 AVC U20 Asian Championship
- 2017 FIVB U19 World Championship
- 2018 AVC U20 Asian Championship
- 2019 FIVB U21 World Championship

=== Individual awards ===
- 2014: AVC U18 Asian Championship – Best outside spiker
- 2016: AVC U20 Asian Championship – Best outside spiker
- 2017: FIVB U19 World Championship – Most valuable player
- 2017: FIVB U19 World Championship – Best outside spiker
- 2018: AVC U20 Asian Championship – Most valuable player
- 2019: FIVB U21 World Championship – Most valuable player
