= Iran men's national under-21 volleyball team =

Iran
- Association: IRIVF
- Confederation: AVC
- Head coach: Gholamreza Momeni-Moghaddam

Uniforms
| Home | Away | Third |

FIVB U21 World Championship
- Appearances: 15 (First in 1993)
- Best result: (gold) (2019, 2023, 2025)

Asian U20 Championship
- Appearances: 18 (First in 1988)
- Best result: (gold) (1998, 2002, 2006, 2008, 2014, 2018, 2022, 2024)
- iranvolleyball.com

The Iran men's national under-21 volleyball team represents Iran in men's under-21 volleyball Events, it is controlled and managed by the Islamic Republic of Iran Volleyball Federation (I.R.I.V.F.) and takes part in international volleyball competitions.Iran's national under-21 volleyball team holds the number one spot in the FIVB world rankings.

== Results ==
=== FIVB U21 World Championship ===
Champions Runners-up 3rd place 4th place

FIVB U21 World Championship
| Year | Rank | M | W | L | SF | SA | Squad |
|---|---|---|---|---|---|---|---|
| (Brazil) 1977 | Did Not Compete or Did Not Qualify | | | | | | Squad |
| (United States) 1981 | Did Not Compete or Did Not Qualify | | | | | | Squad |
| (Italy) 1985 | Did Not Compete or Did Not Qualify | | | | | | Squad |
| (Bahrain) 1987 | Did Not Compete or Did Not Qualify | | | | | | Squad |
| (Greece) 1989 | Did Not Compete or Did Not Qualify | | | | | | Squad |
| (Egypt) 1991 | Did Not Compete or Did Not Qualify | | | | | | Squad |
| (Argentina) 1993 | 9th place | 6 | 1 | 5 | 6 | 17 | Squad |
| (Malaysia) 1995 | Did Not Qualify | | | | | | Squad |
| (Bahrain) 1997 | 9th place | 4 | 1 | 3 | 3 | 10 | Squad |
| (Thailand) 1999 | 8th place | 7 | 2 | 5 | 9 | 16 | Squad |
| (Poland) 2001 | Did Not Qualify | | | | | | Squad |
| (Iran) 2003 | 6th place | 7 | 4 | 3 | 13 | 13 | Squad |
| (India) 2005 | 5th place | 7 | 4 | 3 | 17 | 12 | Squad |
| (Morocco) 2007 | 3rd place | 7 | 5 | 2 | 18 | 10 | Squad |
| (India) 2009 | 7th place | 8 | 5 | 3 | 15 | 14 | Squad |
| (Brazil) 2011 | 6th place | 8 | 4 | 4 | 17 | 13 | Squad |
| (Turkey) 2013 | 5th place | 8 | 7 | 1 | 21 | 5 | Squad |
| (Mexico) 2015 | 12th place | 8 | 3 | 5 | 15 | 17 | Squad |
| (Czech Republic) 2017 | 5th place | 8 | 6 | 2 | 22 | 14 | Squad |
| (Bahrain) 2019 | Champions | 8 | 6 | 2 | 21 | 9 | Squad |
| (Italy) (Bulgaria) 2021 | 9th place | 8 | 6 | 2 | 22 | 8 | Squad |
| (Bahrain) 2023 | Champions | 8 | 8 | 0 | 24 | 7 | Squad |
| (China) 2025 | Champions | 9 | 9 | 0 | 27 | 6 | Squad |
| Total | 15/23 | 111 | 71 | 40 | 250 | 169 | - |

=== Asian U20 Championship ===
Champions Runners-up 3rd place 4th place

Asian U20 Championship
| Year | Rank | M | W | L | SF | SA | Squad |
|---|---|---|---|---|---|---|---|
| (South Korea) 1980 | Did Not Compete | | | | | | Squad |
| (Saudi Arabia) 1984 | Did Not Compete | | | | | | Squad |
| (Thailand) 1986 | Did Not Compete | | | | | | Squad |
| (Indonesia) 1988 | 11th place | 0 | 0 | 0 | 0 | 0 | Squad |
| (Thailand) 1990 | 9th place | 0 | 0 | 0 | 0 | 0 | Squad |
| (Iran) 1992 | 4th place | 0 | 0 | 0 | 0 | 0 | Squad |
| (Qatar) 1994 | 6th place | 0 | 0 | 0 | 0 | 0 | Squad |
| (Vietnam) 1996 | 6th place | 0 | 0 | 0 | 0 | 0 | Squad |
| (Iran) 1998 | Champions | 7 | 7 | 0 | 21 | 2 | Squad |
| (Iran) 2000 | 3rd place | 6 | 4 | 2 | 15 | 10 | Squad |
| (Iran) 2002 | Champions | 6 | 6 | 0 | 18 | 4 | Squad |
| (Qatar) 2004 | 2nd place | 5 | 3 | 2 | 10 | 7 | Squad |
| (Iran) 2006 | Champions | 5 | 4 | 1 | 14 | 6 | Squad |
| (Iran) 2008 | Champions | 7 | 7 | 0 | 21 | 3 | Squad |
| (Thailand) 2010 | 2nd place | 8 | 7 | 1 | 22 | 4 | Squad |
| (Iran) 2012 | 3rd place | 7 | 6 | 1 | 20 | 6 | Squad |
| (Bahrain) 2014 | Champions | 7 | 7 | 0 | 21 | 3 | Squad |
| (Taiwan) 2016 | 2nd place | 8 | 7 | 1 | 23 | 4 | Squad |
| (Bahrain) 2018 | Champions | 6 | 6 | 0 | 18 | 1 | Squad |
| (Bahrain) 2022 | Champions | 5 | 5 | 0 | 15 | 4 | Squad |
| (Indonesia) 2024 | Champions | 7 | 7 | 0 | 21 | 2 | Squad |
| Total | 18/21 | 84 | 76 | 8 | 229 | 56 | - |

== See also ==
- Iran men's national under-23 volleyball team
- Iran men's national under-18 volleyball team
