= 2016 Asian Men's U20 Volleyball Championship =

2016 Asian Men's U20 Championship

Tournament details
- Host country: Taiwan
- Dates: 9–17 July
- Teams: 16
- Venues: 2 (in 1 host city)

Final positions
- Champions: China (4th title)

Tournament awards
- MVP: (China) Liu Zhihao

The 2016 Asian Men's U20 Volleyball Championship was held in Kaohsiung, Taiwan from 9 to 17 July 2016. The top two teams qualified for the 2017 U21 World Championship.

== Pools composition ==
Teams were seeded in the first two positions of each pool following the Serpentine system according to their final standing of the 2014 edition. AVC reserved the right to seed the hosts as head of Pool A regardless of the final standing of the 2014 edition. All teams not seeded were drawn. Final standing of the 2014 edition are shown in brackets except Hosts who ranked 6th.

Pool A	Pool B	Pool C	Pool D
Chinese Taipei (Hosts)	Iran (1)	China (2)	South Korea (3)
Thailand (8)	Qatar (7)	Japan (5)	Bahrain (4)
Kazakhstan (10)	Turkmenistan (13)	Pakistan (–)	Sri Lanka (11)
Saudi Arabia (12)	Hong Kong (17)	Iraq (–)	Australia (–)

== Venues ==
- Kaohsiung Arena, Kaohsiung, Taiwan – Main venue
- Fengshan Gymnasium, Kaohsiung, Taiwan – Sub venue

== Pool standing procedure ==
1. Number of matches won
2. Match points
3. Sets ratio
4. Points ratio
5. Result of the last match between the tied teams

Match won 3–0 or 3–1: 3 match points for the winner, 0 match points for the loser
Match won 3–2: 2 match points for the winner, 1 match point for the loser

== Preliminary round ==
- All times are Taiwan National Standard Time (UTC+08:00).

=== Pool A ===
Pos	Team	Pld	W	L	Pts	SW	SL	SR	SPW	SPL	SPR	Qualification
1	Thailand	3	3	0	9	9	1	9.000	256	198	1.293	Pool E
2	Kazakhstan	3	2	1	5	6	6	1.000	250	276	0.906	Pool E
3	Chinese Taipei	3	1	2	3	5	7	0.714	266	264	1.008	Pool G
4	Saudi Arabia	3	0	3	1	3	9	0.333	259	293	0.884	Pool G

Date	Time		Score		Set 1	Set 2	Set 3	Set 4	Set 5	Total	Report
9 Jul	15:00	Thailand	3–0	Kazakhstan	25–20	25–15	25–15			75–50	Report
9 Jul	18:35	Chinese Taipei	3–1	Saudi Arabia	25–17	25–20	21–25	25–18		96–80	Report
10 Jul	17:35	Saudi Arabia	2–3	Kazakhstan	25–20	23–25	20–25	25–22	15–17	108–109	Report
10 Jul	20:35	Chinese Taipei	1–3	Thailand	18–25	13–25	25–18	21–25		77–93	Report
11 Jul	17:25	Thailand	3–0	Saudi Arabia	38–36	25–16	25–19			88–71	Report
11 Jul	19:40	Chinese Taipei	1–3	Kazakhstan	23–25	25–16	22–25	23–25		93–91	Report

=== Pool B ===
Pos	Team	Pld	W	L	Pts	SW	SL	SR	SPW	SPL	SPR	Qualification
1	Iran	3	3	0	9	9	0	MAX	225	139	1.619	Pool F
2	Turkmenistan	3	2	1	6	6	4	1.500	222	229	0.969	Pool F
3	Hong Kong	3	1	2	3	4	6	0.667	206	234	0.880	Pool H
4	Qatar	3	0	3	0	0	9	0.000	175	226	0.774	Pool H

Date	Time		Score		Set 1	Set 2	Set 3	Set 4	Set 5	Total	Report
9 Jul	11:00	Iran	3–0	Turkmenistan	25–12	25–22	25–18			75–52	Report
10 Jul	13:00	Hong Kong	1–3	Turkmenistan	25–20	18–25	19–25	23–25		85–95	Report
10 Jul	15:45	Qatar	0–3	Iran	16–25	15–25	11–25			42–75	Report
11 Jul	13:00	Hong Kong	0–3	Iran	13–25	17–25	15–25			45–75	Report
11 Jul	15:05	Turkmenistan	3–0	Qatar	25–23	25–23	25–23			75–69	Report
12 Jul	13:30	Qatar	0–3	Hong Kong	20–25	20–25	24–26			64–76	Report

=== Pool C ===
Pos	Team	Pld	W	L	Pts	SW	SL	SR	SPW	SPL	SPR	Qualification
1	China	3	3	0	9	9	0	MAX	226	161	1.404	Pool E
2	Japan	3	2	1	6	6	4	1.500	239	222	1.077	Pool E
3	Iraq	3	1	2	3	3	7	0.429	202	228	0.886	Pool G
4	Pakistan	3	0	3	0	2	9	0.222	213	269	0.792	Pool G

Date	Time		Score		Set 1	Set 2	Set 3	Set 4	Set 5	Total	Report
9 Jul	19:00	China	3–0	Iraq	25–18	25–14	25–15			75–47	Report
10 Jul	17:00	Japan	3–0	Iraq	25–21	25–21	25–17			75–59	Report
10 Jul	19:30	China	3–0	Pakistan	25–19	25–11	25–18			75–48	Report
11 Jul	17:00	China	3–0	Japan	25–20	26–24	25–22			76–66	Report
11 Jul	19:05	Pakistan	1–3	Iraq	21–25	25–21	14–25	18–25		78–96	Report
12 Jul	11:00	Pakistan	1–3	Japan	25–23	17–25	23–25	22–25		87–98	Report

=== Pool D ===
Pos	Team	Pld	W	L	Pts	SW	SL	SR	SPW	SPL	SPR	Qualification
1	South Korea	3	3	0	9	9	1	9.000	248	198	1.253	Pool F
2	Sri Lanka	3	2	1	6	6	4	1.500	233	215	1.084	Pool F
3	Australia	3	1	2	3	5	6	0.833	241	258	0.934	Pool H
4	Bahrain	3	0	3	0	0	9	0.000	175	226	0.774	Pool H

Date	Time		Score		Set 1	Set 2	Set 3	Set 4	Set 5	Total	Report
9 Jul	13:00	South Korea	3–0	Bahrain	25–17	25–23	25–16			75–56	Report
9 Jul	15:00	Australia	1–3	Sri Lanka	25–23	23–25	19–25	16–25		83–98	Report
10 Jul	13:00	Bahrain	0–3	Sri Lanka	18–25	19–25	20–25			57–75	Report
10 Jul	15:00	South Korea	3–1	Australia	23–25	25–14	25–23	25–20		98–82	Report
11 Jul	13:00	Australia	3–0	Bahrain	26–24	25–17	25–21			76–62	Report
11 Jul	15:00	Sri Lanka	0–3	South Korea	20–25	20–25	20–25			60–75	Report

== Classification round ==
- All times are Taiwan National Standard Time (UTC+08:00).
- The results and the points of the matches between the same teams that were already played during the preliminary round shall be taken into account for the classification round.

=== Pool E ===
Pos	Team	Pld	W	L	Pts	SW	SL	SR	SPW	SPL	SPR	Qualification
1	China	3	3	0	9	9	0	MAX	226	148	1.527	Quarterfinals
2	Japan	3	2	1	5	6	5	1.200	249	231	1.078	Quarterfinals
3	Thailand	3	1	2	4	5	6	0.833	223	233	0.957	Quarterfinals
4	Kazakhstan	3	0	3	0	0	9	0.000	139	225	0.618	Quarterfinals

Date	Time		Score		Set 1	Set 2	Set 3	Set 4	Set 5	Total	Report
13 Jul	15:00	China	3–0	Kazakhstan	25–12	25–9	25–14			75–35	Report
13 Jul	17:15	Thailand	2–3	Japan	19–25	25–21	25–22	20–25	12–15	101–108	Report
14 Jul	15:00	Kazakhstan	0–3	Japan	15–25	17–25	22–25			54–75	Report
14 Jul	17:05	Thailand	0–3	China	18–25	18–25	11–25			47–75	Report

=== Pool F ===
Pos	Team	Pld	W	L	Pts	SW	SL	SR	SPW	SPL	SPR	Qualification
1	Iran	3	3	0	9	9	0	MAX	225	153	1.471	Quarterfinals
2	South Korea	3	2	1	6	6	3	2.000	205	189	1.085	Quarterfinals
3	Turkmenistan	3	1	2	2	3	8	0.375	215	258	0.833	Quarterfinals
4	Sri Lanka	3	0	3	1	2	9	0.222	214	259	0.826	Quarterfinals

Date	Time		Score		Set 1	Set 2	Set 3	Set 4	Set 5	Total	Report
13 Jul	12:35	Iran	3–0	Sri Lanka	25–18	25–14	25–14			75–46	Report
13 Jul	13:00	South Korea	3–0	Turkmenistan	25–18	25–18	25–18			75–54	Report
14 Jul	12:35	Iran	3–0	South Korea	25–19	25–16	25–20			75–55	Report
14 Jul	13:00	Turkmenistan	3–2	Sri Lanka	25–23	21–25	23–25	25–23	15–12	109–108	Report

=== Pool G ===
Pos	Team	Pld	W	L	Pts	SW	SL	SR	SPW	SPL	SPR	Qualification
1	Iraq	3	3	0	8	9	3	3.000	271	240	1.129	9th–12th semifinals
2	Chinese Taipei	3	2	1	7	8	5	1.600	300	259	1.158	9th–12th semifinals
3	Pakistan	3	1	2	3	5	6	0.833	232	254	0.913	13th–16th semifinals
4	Saudi Arabia	3	0	3	0	1	9	0.111	196	246	0.797	13th–16th semifinals

Date	Time		Score		Set 1	Set 2	Set 3	Set 4	Set 5	Total	Report
13 Jul	17:00	Iraq	3–0	Saudi Arabia	25–17	25–18	25–22			75–57	Report
13 Jul	20:00	Chinese Taipei	3–1	Pakistan	25–12	25–18	23–25	26–24		99–79	Report
14 Jul	17:30	Saudi Arabia	0–3	Pakistan	20–25	22–25	17–25			59–75	Report
14 Jul	19:05	Chinese Taipei	2–3	Iraq	23–25	24–26	25–17	25–17	8–15	105–100	Report

=== Pool H ===
Pos	Team	Pld	W	L	Pts	SW	SL	SR	SPW	SPL	SPR	Qualification
1	Australia	3	2	1	6	7	3	2.333	251	233	1.077	9th–12th semifinals
2	Qatar	3	2	1	6	6	4	1.500	243	238	1.021	9th–12th semifinals
3	Hong Kong	3	2	1	5	6	5	1.200	247	232	1.065	13th–16th semifinals
4	Bahrain	3	0	3	1	2	9	0.222	217	255	0.851	13th–16th semifinals

Date	Time		Score		Set 1	Set 2	Set 3	Set 4	Set 5	Total	Report
13 Jul	14:35	Australia	1–3	Qatar	23–25	27–25	21–25	27–29		98–104	Report
13 Jul	19:00	Hong Kong	3–2	Bahrain	25–16	17–25	22–25	25–12	15–13	104–91	Report
14 Jul	14:35	Qatar	3–0	Bahrain	25–22	25–22	25–20			75–64	Report
14 Jul	19:25	Hong Kong	0–3	Australia	19–25	23–25	25–27			67–77	Report

== Final round ==
- All times are Taiwan National Standard Time (UTC+08:00).

=== 13th–16th places ===
13th–16th semifinals
15 July
Pakistan	3
Bahrain	0
15 July
Hong Kong	2
Saudi Arabia	3

13th place match
16 July
Pakistan	3
Saudi Arabia	1
15th place match
16 July
Bahrain	3
Hong Kong	2

==== 13th–16th semifinals ====
Date	Time		Score		Set 1	Set 2	Set 3	Set 4	Set 5	Total	Report
15 Jul	17:00	Pakistan	3–0	Bahrain	25–14	26–24	27–25			78–63	Report
15 Jul	19:00	Hong Kong	2–3	Saudi Arabia	17–25	18–25	26–24	25–21	12–15	98–110	Report

==== 15th place match ====
Date	Time		Score		Set 1	Set 2	Set 3	Set 4	Set 5	Total	Report
16 Jul	13:00	Bahrain	3–2	Hong Kong	25–21	18–25	24–26	25–16	15–10	107–98	Report

==== 13th place match ====
Date	Time		Score		Set 1	Set 2	Set 3	Set 4	Set 5	Total	Report
16 Jul	15:00	Pakistan	3–1	Saudi Arabia	25–13	25–19	22–25	28–26		100–83	Report

=== 9th–12th places ===
9th–12th semifinals
15 July
Iraq	2
Qatar	3
15 July
Australia	3
Chinese Taipei	2

9th place match
16 July
Qatar	1
Australia	3
11th place match
16 July
Iraq	3
Chinese Taipei	1

==== 9th–12th semifinals ====
Date	Time		Score		Set 1	Set 2	Set 3	Set 4	Set 5	Total	Report
15 Jul	17:00	Iraq	2–3	Qatar	18–25	27–25	11–25	25–19	11–15	92–109	Report
15 Jul	19:55	Australia	3–2	Chinese Taipei	24–26	17–25	25–20	25–20	18–16	109–107	Report

==== 11th place match ====
Date	Time		Score		Set 1	Set 2	Set 3	Set 4	Set 5	Total	Report
16 Jul	17:00	Iraq	3–1	Chinese Taipei	25–21	24–26	25–18	28–26		102–91	Report

==== 9th place match ====
Date	Time		Score		Set 1	Set 2	Set 3	Set 4	Set 5	Total	Report
16 Jul	19:00	Qatar	1–3	Australia	20–25	13–25	25–23	19–25		77–98	Report

=== Final eight ===
Quarterfinals
15 July
Iran	3
Kazakhstan	0
15 July
Japan	3
Turkmenistan	0
15 July
China	3
Sri Lanka	0
15 July
South Korea	3
Thailand	0

Semifinals
16 July
Iran	3
Japan	1
16 July
China	3
South Korea	0

Final
17 July
Iran	2
China	3
3rd place match
17 July
Japan	2
South Korea	3

5th–8th semifinals
16 July
Kazakhstan	1
Turkmenistan	3
16 July
Sri Lanka	1
Thailand	3

5th place match
17 July
Turkmenistan	0
Thailand	3
7th place match
17 July
Kazakhstan	0
Sri Lanka	3

==== Quarterfinals ====
Date	Time		Score		Set 1	Set 2	Set 3	Set 4	Set 5	Total	Report
15 Jul	12:35	China	3–0	Sri Lanka	25–16	25–17	25–10			75–43	Report
15 Jul	13:00	Iran	3–0	Kazakhstan	25–18	25–13	25–9			75–40	Report
15 Jul	14:35	South Korea	3–0	Thailand	25–21	25–20	25–22			75–63	Report
15 Jul	15:00	Japan	3–0	Turkmenistan	25–20	25–16	25–12			75–48	Report

==== 5th–8th semifinals ====
Date	Time		Score		Set 1	Set 2	Set 3	Set 4	Set 5	Total	Report
16 Jul	12:30	Kazakhstan	1–3	Turkmenistan	25–22	20–25	19–25	23–25		87–97	Report
16 Jul	14:30	Sri Lanka	1–3	Thailand	20–25	20–25	25–19	21–25		86–94	Report

==== Semifinals ====
Date	Time		Score		Set 1	Set 2	Set 3	Set 4	Set 5	Total	Report
16 Jul	17:00	Iran	3–1	Japan	25–16	25–16	29–31	25–19		104–82	Report
16 Jul	19:00	China	3–0	South Korea	25–23	25–17	26–24			76–64	Report

==== 7th place match ====
Date	Time		Score		Set 1	Set 2	Set 3	Set 4	Set 5	Total	Report
17 Jul	11:00	Kazakhstan	0–3	Sri Lanka	22–25	16–25	17–25			55–75	Report

==== 5th place match ====
Date	Time		Score		Set 1	Set 2	Set 3	Set 4	Set 5	Total	Report
17 Jul	13:00	Turkmenistan	0–3	Thailand	16–25	19–25	23–25			58–75	Report

==== 3rd place match ====
Date	Time		Score		Set 1	Set 2	Set 3	Set 4	Set 5	Total	Report
17 Jul	15:30	Japan	2–3	South Korea	25–21	25–19	17–25	24–26	14–16	105–107	Report

==== Final ====
Date	Time		Score		Set 1	Set 2	Set 3	Set 4	Set 5	Total	Report
17 Jul	17:30	Iran	2–3	China	25–27	25–21	29–31	25–18	13–15	117–112	Report

== Final standing ==
Rank	Team
1st place, gold medalist(s)	China
2nd place, silver medalist(s)	Iran
3rd place, bronze medalist(s)	South Korea
4	Japan
5	Thailand
6	Turkmenistan
7	Sri Lanka
8	Kazakhstan
9	Australia
10	Qatar
11	Iraq
12	Chinese Taipei
13	Pakistan
14	Saudi Arabia
15	Bahrain
16	Hong Kong

Qualified for the 2017 U21 World Championship

2016 Asian Men's U20 champions

China
4th title

12–man roster
Yang Xueshuai (c), Liu Zhihao, Yu Yuantai, Jiang Hongbin, Guo Shunxiang, Li Nan, Wang Jingyi, Zhou Liying, Zhang Zuyuan, Guo Lei, Tao Zixuan, Yang Huaxing
Head coach
Ju Genyin

== Awards ==
- Most valuable player
  (China) Liu Zhihao
- Best setter
  (Iran) Javad Karimi
- Best outside spikers
  (Iran) Amirhossein Esfandiar
  (China) Yu Yuantai
- Best middle blockers
  (Iran) Ali Asghar Mojarad
  (China) Tao Zixuan
- Best opposite spiker
  (Iran) Rasoul Aghchehli
- Best libero
  (South Korea) Oh Eun-ryeol

== See also ==
- List of sporting events in Taiwan
