= AVC Men's U20 Volleyball Championship =

International volleyball competition in Asia and Oceania

- Most recent season or competition: 2024 Asian Men's U20 Volleyball Championship
- Sport: Volleyball
- Founded: 1980; 46 years ago
- First season: 1980
- No. of teams: 16
- Continents: Asia and Oceania (AVC)
- Most recent champions: Iran (8th title)
- Most titles: Iran (8 titles)

The AVC Men's U20 Volleyball Championship is an international volleyball competition in Asia and Oceania contested by the under 20 men's national teams of the members of Asian Volleyball Confederation (AVC), the sport's continent governing body. Tournaments have been awarded every two years since 1980. The top four teams qualified for the FIVB Volleyball Men's U21 World Championship. The current champion is Iran, which won its seventh title at the 2024 tournament.

The 20 Asian Championship tournaments have been won by four different national teams: Iran have won seven times, South Korea with six title, China with four titles, and Japan with three titles.

== Result summary ==
Year	Host	Final			3rd place match			Teams
Year	Host	Champions	Score	Runners-up	3rd place	Score	4th place	Teams
1980; Details	(South Korea); Seoul	South Korea	Round-robin	Japan	India	Round-robin	Indonesia	10
1984; Details	(Saudi Arabia); Riyadh	South Korea		China	Japan		Saudi Arabia	8
1986; Details	(Thailand); Bangkok	South Korea	3–2	Japan	China	3–1	North Korea	15
1988; Details	(Indonesia); Jakarta	Japan	3–1	South Korea	China		Indonesia	17
1990; Details	(Thailand); Bangkok	China		Japan	South Korea		Thailand	14
1992; Details	(Iran); Tehran	South Korea		Japan	China		Iran	13
1994; Details	(Qatar); Doha	South Korea	Round-robin	India	China	Round-robin	Japan	12
1996; Details	(Vietnam); Ho Chi Minh City	China	Round-robin	Chinese Taipei	Japan	Round-robin	India	13
1998; Details	(Iran); Tehran	Iran	Round-robin	South Korea	Chinese Taipei	Round-robin	China	12
2000; Details	(Iran); Tehran	China	Round-robin	Saudi Arabia	Iran	Round-robin	Japan	13
2002; Details	(Iran); Tehran	Iran	3–1	India	China	3–0	South Korea	14
2004; Details	(Qatar); Doha	South Korea	3–1	Iran	Qatar	3–2	Japan	19
2006; Details	(Iran); Tehran	Iran	Round-robin	Japan	India	Round-robin	Chinese Taipei	16
2008; Details	(Iran); Tehran	Iran	3–1	China	Pakistan	3–0	India	13
2010; Details	(Thailand); Nakhon Pathom	Japan	3–1	Iran	India	3–2	China	16
2012; Details	(Iran); Urmia	Japan	3–0	China	Iran	3–0	India	13
2014; Details	(Bahrain); Manama	Iran	3–0	China	South Korea	3–0	Bahrain	18
2016; Details	(Taiwan); Kaohsiung	China	3–2	Iran	South Korea	3–2	Japan	16
2018; Details	(Bahrain); Riffa	Iran	3–0	South Korea	Thailand	3–1	Iraq	23
2020; Details	(Iran); Tehran	Canceled due to COVID-19 pandemic						
2022; Details	(Bahrain); Riffa	Iran	3–1	India	South Korea	3–0	Thailand	17
2024; Details	(Indonesia); Surabaya	Iran	3–0	South Korea	Japan	3–1	Indonesia	16
2027; Details	(Bahrain); Manama							

=== Teams reaching the top four ===
Team	Winners	Runners-up	Third-place	Fourth-place
Iran	8 (1998, 2002, 2006, 2008, 2014, 2018, 2022, 2024)	3 (2004, 2010, 2016)	2 (2000, 2012)	1 (1992)
South Korea	6 (1980, 1984, 1986, 1992, 1994, 2004)	4 (1988, 1998, 2018, 2024)	4 (1990, 2014, 2016, 2022)	1 (2002)
China	4 (1990, 1996, 2000, 2016)	4 (1984, 2008, 2012, 2014)	5 (1986, 1988, 1992, 1994, 2002)	2 (1998, 2010)
Japan	3 (1988, 2010, 2012)	5 (1980, 1986, 1990, 1992, 2006)	3 (1984, 1996, 2024)	4 (1994, 2000, 2004, 2016)
India		3 (1994, 2002, 2022)	3 (1980, 2006, 2010)	3 (1996, 2008, 2010)
Chinese Taipei		1 (1996)	1 (1998)	1 (2006)
Saudi Arabia		1 (2000)		1 (1984)
Thailand			1 (2018)	2 (1990, 2022)
Pakistan			1 (2008)	
Qatar			1 (2010)	
Indonesia				3 (1980, 1988, 2024)
North Korea				1 (1986)
Bahrain				1 (2014)
Iraq				1 (2018)

=== Champions by region ===
Federation (Region)	Champion(s)	Number
EAZVA (East Asia)	Korea (6); China (4); Japan (3)	13 titles
CAZVA (Central Asia)	Iran (8)	8 titles

== Hosts ==
Times Hosted	Nations	Year(s)
7	Iran	1992, 1998, 2000, 2002, 2006, 2008, 2012, ~~2020~~
4	Bahrain	2014, 2018, 2022, 2027
3	Thailand	1986, 1990, 2010
2	Qatar	1994, 2004
2	Indonesia	1988, 2024
1	Saudi Arabia	1984
1	South Korea	1980
1	Taiwan	2016
1	Vietnam	1996

== Medal table ==
Rank	Nation	Gold	Silver	Bronze	Total
1	Iran	8	3	2	13
2	South Korea	6	4	4	14
3	China	4	4	5	13
4	Japan	3	5	3	11
5	India	0	3	3	6
6	Chinese Taipei	0	1	1	2
7	Saudi Arabia	0	1	0	1
8	Pakistan	0	0	1	1
8	Qatar	0	0	1	1
8	Thailand	0	0	1	1
Totals (10 entries)		21	21	21	63

== Participating nations ==
Legend

- 1st – Champions
- 2nd – Runners-up
- 3rd – Third place
- 4th – Fourth place
- • – Did not enter / Did not qualify
- – Hosts
- Q – Qualified for the forthcoming tournament

Year Team	(South Korea) 1980 (10)	(Saudi Arabia) 1984 (8)	(Thailand) 1986 (15)	(Indonesia) 1988 (17)	(Thailand) 1990 (14)	(Iran) 1992 (13)	(Qatar) 1994 (12)	(Vietnam) 1996 (13)	(Iran) 1998 (12)	(Iran) 2000 (13)	(Iran) 2002 (14)	(Qatar) 2004 (19)	(Iran) 2006 (16)	(Iran) 2008 (13)	(Thailand) 2010 (16)	(Iran) 2012 (13)	(Bahrain) 2014 (18)	(Taiwan) 2016 (16)	(Bahrain) 2018 (23)	(Bahrain) 2022 (17)	(Indonesia) 2024 (16)	Total
Afghanistan	•	•	•	•	•	•	•	•	•	•	•	•	•	•	•	13th	•	•	•	•	•	1
Australia	5th	•	11th	10th	8th	6th	8th	8th	7th	7th	9th	7th	7th	5th	15th	7th	•	9th	7th	15th	11th	19
Bahrain	•	6th	10th	6th	•	10th	•	•	•	8th	6th	18th	11th	•	•	•	4th	15th	9th	7th	•	12
Bangladesh	•	•	•	•	•	•	•	•	•	•	•	•	•	•	•	•	•	•	•	5th	14th	2
China	•	2nd	3rd	3rd	1st	3rd	3rd	1st	4th	1st	3rd	6th	5th	2nd	4th	2nd	2nd	1st	5th	6th	7th	20
Chinese Taipei	•	•	5th	5th	5th	5th	9th	2nd	3rd	11th	7th	9th	4th	9th	6th	6th	6th	12th	6th	14th	10th	19
Hong Kong	10th	•	•	17th	•	•	•	12th	•	•	•	•	•	•	•	•	17th	16th	19th	16th	12th	8
India	3rd	5th	9th	7th	11th	7th	2nd	4th	5th	9th	2nd	5th	3rd	4th	3rd	4th	9th	•	15th	2nd	6th	20
Indonesia	4th	7th	6th	4th	6th	12th	•	•	•	•	•	14th	12th	10th	9th	•	•	•	•	•	4th	11
Iran	•	•	•	11th	9th	4th	6th	6th	1st	3rd	1st	2nd	1st	1st	2nd	3rd	1st	2nd	1st	1st	1st	18
Iraq	•	8th	•	12th	•	•	•	•	•	•	•	•	•	•	13th	•	•	11th	4th	10th	•	6
Japan	2nd	3rd	2nd	1st	2nd	2nd	4th	3rd	6th	4th	10th	4th	2nd	7th	1st	1st	5th	4th	13th	13th	3rd	21
Jordan	•	•	•	•	•	•	•	•	•	•	•	19th	•	•	•	•	•	•	20th	•	•	2
Kazakhstan	•	•	•	•	•	•	•	•	10th	12th	•	•	•	12th	11th	9th	10th	8th	8th	•	5th	9
Kuwait	9th	•	12th	•	12th	13th	11th	•	•	•	13th	12th	15th	•	•	•	18th	•	•	17th	15th	11
Macau	•	•	•	•	•	•	•	•	•	•	•	•	•	•	•	•	•	•	21st	•	•	1
Malaysia	•	•	•	•	•	•	•	13th	•	•	•	•	•	•	•	•	•	•	23rd	•	•	2
Maldives	•	•	•	•	•	•	•	•	•	•	•	•	•	13th	16th	•	15th	•	22nd	•	•	4
Myanmar	•	•	•	•	7th	•	•	•	•	•	•	•	•	•	•	•	•	•	•	•	•	1
New Zealand	•	•	•	16th	14th	8th	•	•	•	•	•	•	•	•	14th	•	14th	•	17th	•	•	6
North Korea	•	•	4th	•	•	•	•	•	•	10th	•	•	•	•	•	•	•	•	•	•	•	2
Oman	•	•	•	•	•	•	10th	•	•	•	•	8th	•	•	•	•	•	•	•	•	•	2
Pakistan	•	•	•	•	•	9th	5th	•	8th	6th	5th	13th	9th	3rd	•	•	•	13th	14th	8th	•	11
Philippines	•	•	•	•	•	•	•	11th	•	•	•	•	•	•	•	•	•	•	•	•	•	1
Qatar	•	•	15th	14th	•	•	7th	•	11th	•	8th	3rd	8th	8th	8th	•	7th	10th	12th	11th	16th	14
Saudi Arabia	8th	4th	7th	•	10th	•	12th	•	•	2nd	•	10th	•	•	•	•	12th	14th	16th	9th	8th	12
Singapore	7th	•	14th	13th	•	•	•	•	•	•	•	•	•	•	•	•	•	•	•	•	•	3
South Korea	1st	1st	1st	2nd	3rd	1st	1st	5th	2nd	5th	4th	1st	6th	6th	5th	5th	3rd	3rd	2nd	3rd	2nd	21
Sri Lanka	•	•	13th	15th	13th	11th	•	10th	12th	13th	•	17th	14th	11th	10th	10th	11th	7th	10th	•	•	15
Thailand	•	•	8th	9th	4th	•	•	7th	•	•	12th	11th	10th	•	7th	8th	8th	5th	3rd	4th	9th	14
Turkmenistan	•	•	•	•	•	•	•	•	•	•	•	•	•	•	•	11th	13th	6th	11th	•	•	4
United Arab Emirates	6th	•	•	8th	•	•	•	•	9th	•	11th	15th	13th	•	•	•	•	•	18th	12th	•	8
Uzbekistan	•	•	•	•	•	•	•	•	•	•	•	•	•	•	•	12th	16th	•	•	•	•	2
Vietnam	•	•	•	•	•	•	•	9th	•	•	•	•	•	•	12th	•	•	•	•	•	13th	3
Yemen	•	•	•	•	•	•	•	•	•	•	14th	16th	16th	•	•	•	•	•	•	•	•	3

=== Debut of teams ===
Year	Debutants	Total
1980	Australia	10
1980	Hong Kong	10
1980	India	10
1980	Indonesia	10
1980	Japan	10
1980	Kuwait	10
1980	Saudi Arabia	10
1980	Singapore	10
1980	South Korea	10
1980	United Arab Emirates	10
1984	Bahrain	3
1984	China	3
1984	Iraq	3
1986	Chinese Taipei	5
1986	North Korea	5
1986	Qatar	5
1986	Sri Lanka	5
1986	Thailand	5
1988	Iran	2
1988	New Zealand	2
1990	Myanmar	1
1992	Pakistan	1
1994	Oman	1
1996	Malaysia	3
1996	Philippines	3
1996	Vietnam	3
1998	Kazakhstan	1
2000	None	0
2002	None	0
2004	Jordan	1
2006	None	0
2008	Maldives	1
2010	None	0
2012	Afghanistan	3
2012	Turkmenistan	3
2012	Uzbekistan	3
2014	None	0
2016	None	0
2018	Macau	1
2022	Bangladesh	1
2024	None	0

== Awards ==
=== Most Valuable Player ===
Tournament	Most Valuable Player
1998 Tehran	(Iran) Alireza Nadi
2002 Tehran	(Iran) Rouhollah Kolivand
2004 Doha	(Japan) Tatsuya Fukuzawa
2006 Tehran	(Iran) Pouria Fathollahi
2008 Tehran	(Iran) Mojtaba Ghiasi
2010 Nakhon Pathom	(Japan) Taiki Tsuruda
2012 Urmia	(Japan) Masahiro Sekita
2014 Manama	(Iran) Mohammad Javad Manavinejad
2016 Kaohsiung	(China) Liu Zhihao
2018 Riffa	(Iran) Amir Hossein Esfandiar
2022 Riffa	(Iran) Amir Mohammad Golzadeh
2024 Surabaya	(Iran) Pouya Ariakhah

=== Best Opposite Spiker ===
Tournament	Best Opposite Spiker
2014 Manama	(Bahrain) Mohamed Anan
2016 Kaohsiung	(Iran) Rasoul Aghchehli
2018 Riffa	(Iraq) Ali Abushanan
2022 Riffa	(Iran) Amir Mohammad Golzadeh
2024 Surabaya	(Indonesia) Dawuda Alaihi

=== Best Outside Spikers ===
Tournament	Best Outside Spikers
2014 Manama	(Iran) Amir Hossein Esfandiar
2014 Manama	(China) Yu Yuantai
2016 Kaohsiung	(Iran) Akbar Valaei
2016 Kaohsiung	(China) Xia Runtao
2018 Riffa	(Iran) Morteza Sharifi
2018 Riffa	(Iran) Porya Yali
2022 Riffa	(South Korea) Lee Yun-soo
2022 Riffa	(Thailand) Kittipong Sangsak
2024 Surabaya	(Japan) Shunta Ono
2024 Surabaya	(South Korea) Lee Woo-jin

=== Best Middle Blockers ===
Tournament	Best Middle Blockers
2014 Manama	(Iran) Sahand Allah Verdian
2014 Manama	(China) Zhang Zhejia
2016 Kaohsiung	(Iran) Ali Asghar Mojarad
2016 Kaohsiung	(China) Tao Zixuan
2018 Riffa	(Thailand) Soranan Nuampara
2018 Riffa	(Iran) Mehran Feyz
2022 Riffa	(India) Dushyan Singh
2022 Riffa	(Iran) Erfan Norouzi
2024 Surabaya	(Iran) Taha Behboudnia
2024 Surabaya	(Iran) Armin Ghelichniazi

=== Best Setter ===
Tournament	Best Setter
1998 Tehran	(Iran) Mohammad Shariati
2002 Tehran	(Iran) Behzad Behnejad
2004 Doha	(South Korea) You Kwang-woo
2006 Tehran	(Japan) Shogo Okamoto
2008 Tehran	(Iran) Farhad Salafzoun
2010 Nakhon Pathom	(China) Xu Xiantao
2012 Urmia	(China) Mao Tianyi
2014 Manama	(China) Yu Yaochen
2016 Kaohsiung	(Iran) Javad Karimi
2018 Riffa	(South Korea) Choi Ik-je
2022 Riffa	(Iran) Arshia Behnezhad
2024 Surabaya	(Iran) Erman Kook Jili

=== Best Libero ===
Tournament	Best Libero
2010 Nakhon Pathom	(Japan) Satoshi Ide
2012 Urmia	(Japan) Raita Takino
2014 Manama	(South Korea) Lee Sang-uk
2016 Kaohsiung	(South Korea) Oh Eun-ryeol
2018 Riffa	(South Korea) Park Kyeong-min
2022 Riffa	(India) Karthikeyan K
2024 Surabaya	(South Korea) Kang Seung-il

== Former awards ==
=== Best Scorer ===
Tournament	Best Scorer
1998 Tehran	(Iran) Behnam Mahmoudi
2004 Doha	(Japan) Hiromitsu Matsuzaki
2006 Tehran	(Japan) Hiromitsu Matsuzaki
2008 Tehran	(China) Dai Qingyao
2010 Nakhon Pathom	(China) Dai Qingyao
2012 Urmia	(Iran) Javad Hosseinabadi

=== Best Spiker ===
Tournament	Best Spiker
1998 Tehran	(Iran) Mohammad Torkashvand
2002 Tehran	(China) Yuan Zhi
2004 Doha	(Iran) Mohammad Soleimani
2006 Tehran	(India) Guttikonda Pradeep
2008 Tehran	(China) Dai Qingyao
2010 Nakhon Pathom	(China) Song Jianwei
2012 Urmia	(China) Jin Zhihong

=== Best Server ===
Tournament	Best Server
1998 Tehran	(Iran) Behnam Mahmoudi
2002 Tehran	(Iran) Rouhollah Kolivand
2004 Doha	(South Korea) Lim Si-hyung
2006 Tehran	(Iran) Mansour Zadvan
2008 Tehran	(Iran) Farhad Salafzoun
2010 Nakhon Pathom	(China) Song Jianwei
2012 Urmia	(Iran) Alireza Nasr Esfahani

=== Best Blocker ===
Tournament	Best Blocker
1998 Tehran	(China) Liu Yuyi
2002 Tehran	(Iran) Davoud Moghbeli
2004 Doha	(Qatar) Jumah Faraj
2006 Tehran	(Iran) Mohammad Mousavi
2008 Tehran	(Iran) Alireza Jadidi
2010 Nakhon Pathom	(India) G. R. Vaishnav
2012 Urmia	(India) Dipesh Kumar Sinha

=== Best Receiver ===
Tournament	Best Receiver
2002 Tehran	(Iran) Farhad Zarif
2004 Doha	(Qatar) Salem Mansour
2006 Tehran	(Chinese Taipei) Chien Wei-lun
2008 Tehran	(Pakistan) Shahrukh Khan

=== Best Digger ===
Tournament	Best Digger
2004 Doha	(Iran) Arash Sadeghiani
2006 Tehran	(Japan) Tomohiko Sakanashi
2008 Tehran	(Iran) Golmohammad Sakhavi

== See also ==
- AVC Women's U20 Volleyball Championship
- AVC Men's Volleyball Continental Championship
- AVC Men's Volleyball Cup
- AVC Boys' U18 Volleyball Championship
- AVC Boys' U16 Volleyball Championship
