= Indonesia men's national under-21 volleyball team =

Indonesia U-21
- Association: Indonesian Volleyball Federation (PBVSI)
- Confederation: AVC
- Head coach: Reidel Toiran

Uniforms
Home	Away	Third

FIVB U21 World Championship
- Appearances: 2 (First in 1989)
- Best result: 15th (1989)

Asian U20 Championship
- Appearances: 11 (First in 1980)
- Best result: 4th (1980, 1988, 2024)

The Indonesia men's national under-21 volleyball team represents Indonesia in men's under-21 volleyball events, it is controlled and managed by the Indonesian Volleyball Federation (PBVSI) and takes part in international volleyball competitions.

== Competition record ==
=== FIVB U21 World Championship ===
Champions Runners-up 3rd place 4th place

FIVB U21 World Championship
Year	Round	Position	Pld	W	L	SW	SL	Squad
(Brazil) 1977	Did not enter or Did not qualify							
(United States) 1981	Did not enter or Did not qualify							
(Italy) 1985	Did not enter or Did not qualify							
(Bahrain) 1987	Did not enter or Did not qualify							
(Greece) 1989	15th–16th places	15th place	6	2	4	6	14	Squad
(Egypt) 1991	Did not qualify							
(Argentina) 1993	Did not qualify							
(Malaysia) 1995	Did not qualify							
(Bahrain) 1997	Did not qualify							
(Thailand) 1999	Did not qualify							
(Poland) 2001	Did not qualify							
(Iran) 2003	Did not qualify							
(India) 2005	Did not qualify							
(Morocco) 2007	Did not qualify							
(India) 2009	Did not qualify							
(Brazil) 2011	Did not qualify							
(Turkey) 2013	Did not qualify							
(Mexico) 2015	Did not qualify							
(Czech Republic) 2017	Did not qualify							
(Bahrain) 2019	Did not qualify							
(Italy) (Bulgaria) 2021	Did not qualify							
(Bahrain) 2023	Did not qualify							
(China) 2025	17th–24th places	19th place	8	3	5	14	17	Squad
Total	0 Titles	2/22	14	5	9	20	31	—

=== Asian U20 Championship ===
Champions Runners-up 3rd place 4th place

Asian U20 Championship
Year	Round	Position	Pld	W	L	SW	SL
(South Korea) 1980	Round robin	4th place	7	3	4	9	13
(Saudi Arabia) 1984		7th place					
(Thailand) 1986	5th place match	6th place	8	4	4	12	12
(Indonesia) 1988	Semifinals	4th place	8	5	3	15	12
(Thailand) 1990		6th place					
(Iran) 1992		12th place					
(Qatar) 1994	Did not participate						
(Vietnam) 1996	Did not participate						
(Iran) 1998	Did not participate						
(Iran) 2000	Did not participate						
(Iran) 2002	Did not participate						
(Qatar) 2004	13th place match	14th place	7	3	4	11	16
(Iran) 2006	9th–12th places	12th place	5	1	4	5	13
(Iran) 2008	9th place match	10th place	6	3	3	10	11
(Thailand) 2010	9th place match	9th place	7	4	3	14	15
(Iran) 2012	Did not participate						
(Bahrain) 2014	Did not participate						
(Taiwan) 2016	Did not participate						
(Bahrain) 2018	Did not participate						
(Bahrain) 2022	Did not participate						
(Indonesia) 2024	Semifinals	4th place	7	4	3	13	11
Total	0 Titles	11/21	55	27	28	89	103

== Team ==
=== Current squad ===
The following is the Indonesia roster in the 2025 U21 World Championship.

Head coach: (China) Li Qiujiang

No.	Name	Pos.	Date of birth	Height	2025 club
3	Bagas Wijanarko	OH	29 March 2005	1.84 m (6 ft 0 in)	(Indonesia) Garuda Jaya
4	Darda Mulya Muhammad	MB	8 January 2005	1.90 m (6 ft 3 in)	(Indonesia) Garuda Jaya
5	Dawuda Alaihimassalam	OP	2 May 2005	1.96 m (6 ft 5 in)	(Indonesia) Garuda Jaya
7	Zaki Hasan Maulana	MB	24 March 2007	1.90 m (6 ft 3 in)	(Indonesia) Garuda Jaya
11	Hilarius Galang Bryantama	S	6 January 2006	1.85 m (6 ft 1 in)	(Indonesia) Garuda Jaya
12	Muhammad Reyhan	L	22 May 2007	1.82 m (6 ft 0 in)	(Indonesia) Garuda Jaya
13	Imam Ahmad Faisal	OP	14 May 2005	1.97 m (6 ft 6 in)	(Indonesia) Ganevo
14	Raihan Rizky Attorif	L	25 January 2006	1.73 m (5 ft 8 in)	(Indonesia) Garuda Jaya
15	Pajar Pamungkas	S	18 May 2005	1.80 m (5 ft 11 in)	(Indonesia) Garuda Jaya
16	Krisna	OH	8 June 2005	1.88 m (6 ft 2 in)	(Indonesia) Surabaya Samator
17	Muhammad Haikal Hidayatullah	OH	7 February 2007	1.90 m (6 ft 3 in)	(Indonesia) Garuda Jaya
18	Agustino	MB	26 August 2005	1.95 m (6 ft 5 in)	(Indonesia) Garuda Jaya
