= Japan men's national under-21 volleyball team =

Japanese national volleyball team

Japan
- Association: Japanese Volleyball Association
- Confederation: AVC
- Head coach: Ueda Yoshitsugu

Uniforms
Home	Away	Third

FIVB U21 World Championship
- Appearances: 14 (First in 1977)
- Best result: (1989)

Asian U20 Championship
- Appearances: 21 (First in 1980)
- Best result: (1988, 2010, 2012)
- jva.or.jp

The Japan men's national under-21 volleyball team represents Japan in men's under-21 volleyball events, it is controlled and managed by the Japanese Volleyball Association that is a member of Asian volleyball body Asian Volleyball Confederation (AVC) and the international volleyball body government the Fédération Internationale de Volleyball (FIVB).

== Results ==
=== FIVB U21 World Championship ===
Champions Runners up Third place Fourth place

FIVB U21 World Championship
Year	Round	Position	Pld	W	L	SW	SL	Squad
(Brazil) 1977		6th place						Squad
(United States) 1981		9th place						Squad
(Italy) 1985		10th place						Squad
(Bahrain) 1987		10th place						Squad
(Greece) 1989	Final	Runners-Up						Squad
(Egypt) 1991		5th place						Squad
(Argentina) 1993		7th place						Squad
(Malaysia) 1995	Did not qualify							
(Bahrain) 1997	Did not qualify							
(Thailand) 1999	Did not qualify							
(Poland) 2001		9th place						Squad
(Iran) 2003	Did not qualify							
(India) 2005	Did not qualify							
(Morocco) 2007	11th place match	11th place	7	3	4	14	16	Squad
(India) 2009	Did not qualify							
(Brazil) 2011	11th place match	12th place	8	4	4	13	18	Squad
(Turkey) 2013	9th place match	10th place	8	3	5	11	19	Squad
(Mexico) 2015		14th place						Squad
(Czech Republic) 2017	13th place match	13th place	8	5	3	17	15	Squad
(Bahrain) 2019	Did not qualify							
(Italy) (Bulgaria) 2021	Did not qualify							
(Bahrain) 2023	Did not qualify							
(China) 2025	11th place match	11th place	9	6	3	22	14	Squad
Total	0 Titles	14/23						

=== Asian U20 Championship ===
Champions Runners up Third place Fourth place

Asian U20 Championship
Year	Round	Position	Pld	W	L	SW	SL
(Thailand) 2010	Final	Champions	8	7	1	22	9
(Iran) 2012	Final	Champions	8	8	0	24	2
(Bahrain) 2014	5th place match	5th place	7	6	1	18	4
(Taiwan) 2016	Semifinals	4th place	8	5	3	18	12
(Bahrain) 2018	Preliminary round	13th place	5	4	1	14	2
(Bahrain) 2022	Preliminary round	13th place	4	2	2	9	6
(Indonesia) 2024	Semifinals	3rd place	7	6	1	20	5
Total	3 Titles	21/21					

== Team ==
=== Current squad ===
The following is the Japanese roster in the 2017 FIVB Volleyball Men's U21 World Championship.

Head coach: Tokunaga Fumitoshi

No.	Name	Date of birth	Height	Weight	Spike	Block	2017 club
1	Kenta Takanashi (c)	25 March 1997	1.90 m (6 ft 3 in)	77 kg (170 lb)	333 cm (131 in)	312 cm (123 in)	(Japan) Nippon Sport Science University
3	Takaki Koyama	23 November 1997	1.91 m (6 ft 3 in)	76 kg (168 lb)	330 cm (130 in)	315 cm (124 in)	(Japan) Osaka Sangyo University
4	Yudai Arai	27 June 1998	1.88 m (6 ft 2 in)	86 kg (190 lb)	345 cm (136 in)	333 cm (131 in)	(Japan) Tokai University
5	Kenyu Nakamoto	21 November 1997	1.87 m (6 ft 2 in)	68 kg (150 lb)	325 cm (128 in)	305 cm (120 in)	(Japan) Nippon Sport Science University
6	Kento Miyaura	22 February 1999	1.89 m (6 ft 2 in)	73 kg (161 lb)	338 cm (133 in)	320 cm (130 in)	(Japan) Waseda University
7	Jin Tsuzuki	28 December 1998	1.94 m (6 ft 4 in)	78 kg (172 lb)	340 cm (130 in)	320 cm (130 in)	(Japan) Chuo University
8	Taisei Muraoka	18 October 1998	1.90 m (6 ft 3 in)	85 kg (187 lb)	335 cm (132 in)	320 cm (130 in)	(Japan) Tokyo Gakugei University
10	Alan Kono	21 January 1999	1.80 m (5 ft 11 in)	74 kg (163 lb)	320 cm (130 in)	308 cm (121 in)	(Japan) Aichi Gakuin University
11	Shunichiro Sato	17 May 2000	2.03 m (6 ft 8 in)	92 kg (203 lb)	335 cm (132 in)	320 cm (130 in)	(Japan) Tohoku High School
12	Masaki Kaneko	23 October 1997	1.88 m (6 ft 2 in)	70 kg (150 lb)	333 cm (131 in)	320 cm (130 in)	(Japan) JT Thunders Hiroshima
14	Tomohiro Horie	23 June 1997	1.83 m (6 ft 0 in)	70 kg (150 lb)	315 cm (124 in)	305 cm (120 in)	(Japan) Waseda University
15	Yusuke Makiyama	4 November 1997	1.85 m (6 ft 1 in)	65 kg (143 lb)	320 cm (130 in)	303 cm (119 in)	(Japan) Chuo University

=== Notable players ===
- Masahiro Sekita (2012–2013)
- Naoya Takano (2012–2013)
- Yūki Ishikawa (2013–2014)
- Kentaro Takahashi (2013)
- Masaki Oya (2014)
- Taishi Onodera (2015)
- Issei Otake (2015)
- Kento Miyaura (2017)
- Kenta Takanashi (2015–2017)

== See also ==
- Japan men's national under-19 volleyball team
- Japan women's national under-20 volleyball team
- Japan men's national volleyball team
