= Park Chul-woo (volleyball) =

South Korean volleyball player (born 1985)

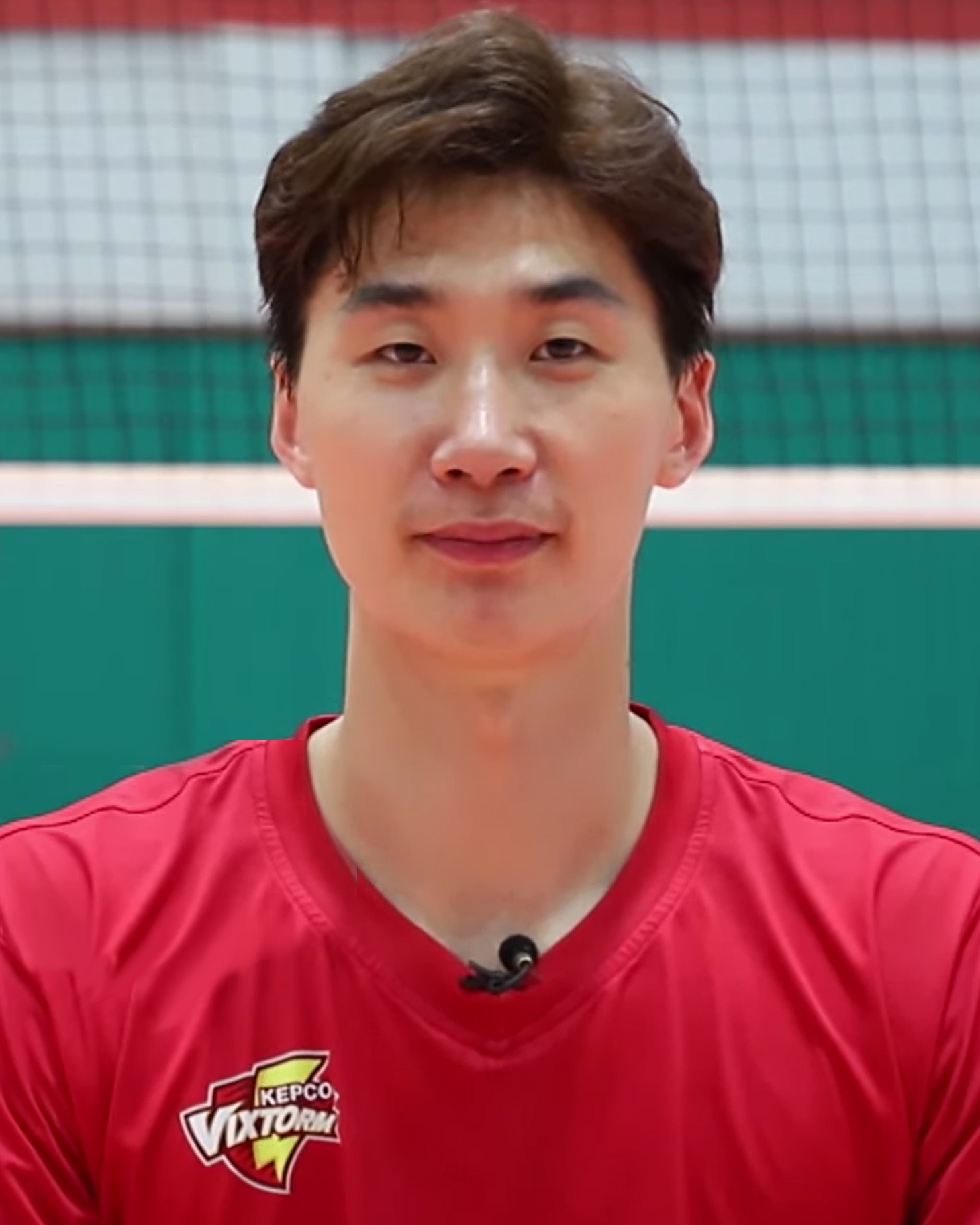

Personal information
- Nationality: South Korean
- Born: 25 July 1985 (age 41); Gumi, Gyeongsangbuk-do, South Korea
- Height: 198 cm (6 ft 6 in)
- Weight: 88 kg (194 lb)
- Spike: 332 cm (10 ft 11 in)
- Block: 319 cm (10 ft 6 in)

Volleyball information
- Position: Opposite spiker
- Current club: Suwon KEPCO Vixtorm
- Number: 3

Career
Years	Teams
2004–2010; 2010–2020; 2020–	Hyundai Capital Skywalkers; Samsung Fire Bluefangs; Suwon KEPCO Vixtorm

National team
2006–2020	South Korea
Medal record
Asian Games
Bronze medal – third place	2010 Guangzhou
Bronze medal – third place	2014 Incheon
AVC Cup
Gold medal – first place	2014 Almaty
Silver medal – second place	2008 Nakhon Ratchasima
Asian Junior Championship
Gold medal – first place	2004 Doha
- Last updated: 18 December 2017

Park Chul-woo (Korean: 박철우; born 25 July 1985 in Gumi, Gyeongsangbuk-do) is a South Korean male volleyball player. On club level he currently plays for the Suwon KEPCO Vixtorm.

== Career ==
=== Club career ===
Park began his professional career out of high school in 2004 after signing a contract with the Hyundai Capital Skywalkers.

An unrestricted free agent in the 2010 offseason, Park was signed by the Samsung Fire Bluefangs on May 31.

=== International career ===
Park first garnered attention at the 2003 World Junior Volleyball Championship, where he led his team to the semifinals of the tournament as the starting opposite spiker. Next year he won the gold medal at the 2004 Asian Junior Volleyball Championship as part of the South Korean junior national team. In 2005 Park got called up to the junior national team again for the 2005 World Junior Volleyball Championship, where his team finished in sixth place.

Park first joined the South Korean senior national team in 2006 and took part in the 2006 FIVB World League, where the team finished in tenth place. Next year Park competed at the 2007 FIVB World League, where South Korea finished ninth for its best result since 1995.

At the inaugural AVC Cup, Park played as the starting opposite spiker in all six matches and helped Team Korea to the gold medal match, where they lost to Asia No. 1 Iran in full sets. He was named the tournament's "Best Spiker".

Park was part of the South Korean national team that won the 2014 AVC Cup when the team defeated India 3–0 in the final match.

== Individual awards ==
=== Club ===
- 2009 V-League - Most Valuable Player

=== National team ===
- 2008 AVC Cup - Best Spiker
