= Azadi Volleyball Hall =

Sports arena in Tehran, Iran

Coordinates: 35°43′43″N 51°15′46″E

- Volleyball Federation Hall
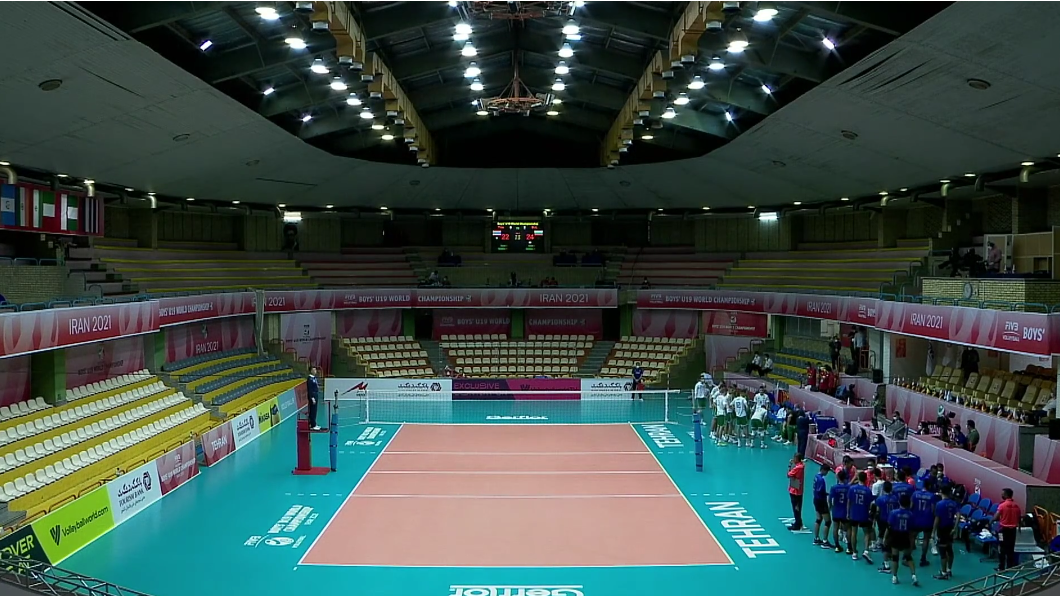
- Interior view of Azadi Volleyball Hall
- Interactive map of Azadi Volleyball Hall
- Full name: Azadi Volleyball Hall
- Location: Tehran, Iran
- Owner: Ministry of Sports
- Operator: Tehran Municipality
- Capacity: 3,000
- Surface: 4,500 m^{2}
- Field size: 72 x 44 m

Construction
- Opened: 1971
- Renovated: 2005

Tenant
- Iran men's national volleyball team

The Azadi Volleyball Hall also known as Volleyball Federation Hall is an all-seater indoor arena located in Tehran, Iran. It is part of 5 Halls Complex within the Azadi Sport Complex. It seats 3,000 people.

== Hosted events ==
- Volleyball at the 1974 Asian Games
- 1992 Asian Junior Men's Volleyball Championship
- 1997 FIVB Volleyball Boys' U19 World Championship
- 1998 FIVB Volleyball Men's World Championship qualification AVC Qualification Pool D
- 1998 Asian Junior Men's Volleyball Championship
- 1999 Asian Men's Volleyball Championship
- 2000 Asian Junior Men's Volleyball Championship
- 2002 AVC Cup Men's Club Tournament
- 2002 Asian Junior Men's Volleyball Championship
- 2003 FIVB Volleyball Men's U21 World Championship
- 2004 Asian Men's Club Volleyball Championship
- 2005 Asian Youth Boys Volleyball Championship
- 2006 FIVB Volleyball Men's World Championship AVC Qualification Second Round Pool F
- 2006 Asian Junior Men's Volleyball Championship
- 2008 Asian Junior Men's Volleyball Championship
- 2010 FIVB Volleyball Men's World Championship AVC Qualification Second Round Pool D
- 2010 Asian Youth Boys Volleyball Championship
- 2011 Asian Men's Volleyball Championship
- 2012 Asian Youth Boys Volleyball Championship
- 2013 Asian Men's Club Volleyball Championship
- 2014 FIVB Volleyball Men's World Championship AVC Qualification Final Round Pool B
- 2015 Asian Men's Volleyball Championship
- 2019 Asian Men's Volleyball Championship
- 2021 FIVB Volleyball Boys' U19 World Championship
- 2022 Asian Boys' U18 Volleyball Championship
