= 2004 Asian Junior Men's Volleyball Championship =

2004 Asian Junior Men's Championship

Tournament details
- Host country: Qatar
- Dates: 3–10 September
- Teams: 16
- Venues: 2 (in 1 host city)

Final positions
- Champions: South Korea (6th title)

Tournament awards
- MVP: (Japan) Tatsuya Fukuzawa

The 2004 Asian Junior Men's Volleyball Championship was held in Doha, Qatar from 3 September to 10 September 2004.

== Pools composition ==
The teams are seeded based on their final ranking at the 2002 Asian Junior Men's Volleyball Championship.

Pool A	Pool B	Pool C	Pool D
Qatar (Host)	Iran (1st)	India (2nd)	China (3rd)
Chinese Taipei (7th); Saudi Arabia; Australia	Bahrain (6th); United Arab Emirates; Thailand; Oman	Pakistan (5th); Jordan; Indonesia; Japan	South Korea (4th); Kuwait; Yemen; Sri Lanka

== Preliminary round ==
=== Pool A ===
Pos	Team	Pld	W	L	Pts	SW	SL	SR	SPW	SPL	SPR	Qualification
1	Australia	2	2	0	4	6	3	2.000	215	199	1.080	Pool E
2	Chinese Taipei	2	1	1	3	4	5	0.800	196	197	0.995	Pool G
3	Saudi Arabia	2	0	2	2	4	6	0.667	201	216	0.931	Pool G

Date	Time		Score		Set 1	Set 2	Set 3	Set 4	Set 5	Total
03 Sep	19:45	Australia	3–2	Saudi Arabia	25–22	25–23	23–25	23–25	15–13	111–108
04 Sep	10:00	Chinese Taipei	1–3	Australia	18–25	27–25	19–25	27–29		91–104
05 Sep	18:30	Saudi Arabia	2–3	Chinese Taipei	25–21	25–19	17–25	14–25	12–15	93–105

=== Pool B ===
Pos	Team	Pld	W	L	Pts	SW	SL	SR	SPW	SPL	SPR	Qualification
1	Oman	3	2	1	5	7	4	1.750	257	241	1.066	Pool F
2	Thailand	3	2	1	5	8	5	1.600	299	267	1.120	Pool H
3	United Arab Emirates	3	1	2	4	4	6	0.667	222	242	0.917	Pool H
4	Bahrain	3	1	2	4	4	8	0.500	248	276	0.899	Pool I

Date	Time		Score		Set 1	Set 2	Set 3	Set 4	Set 5	Total
03 Sep	09:00	Bahrain	1–3	Oman	23–25	16–25	25–21	23–25		87–96
03 Sep	09:00	United Arab Emirates	1–3	Thailand	25–22	20–25	23–25	22–25		90–97
04 Sep	18:30	Oman	1–3	Thailand	25–22	19–25	21–25	20–25		85–97
04 Sep	18:30	Bahrain	0–3	United Arab Emirates	23–25	23–25	23–25			69–75
05 Sep	16:30	United Arab Emirates	0–3	Oman	15–25	18–25	24–26			57–76
05 Sep	16:30	Thailand	2–3	Bahrain	22–25	25–14	25–12	19–25	14–16	105–92

=== Pool C ===
Pos	Team	Pld	W	L	Pts	SW	SL	SR	SPW	SPL	SPR	Qualification
1	Japan	3	3	0	6	9	0	MAX	225	134	1.679	Pool E
2	Pakistan	3	2	1	5	6	3	2.000	209	188	1.112	Pool G
3	Indonesia	3	1	2	4	3	6	0.500	183	207	0.884	Pool G
4	Jordan	3	0	3	3	0	9	0.000	137	225	0.609	Pool I

Date	Time		Score		Set 1	Set 2	Set 3	Set 4	Set 5	Total
03 Sep	13:30	Indonesia	0–3	Japan	21–25	13–25	12–25			46–75
03 Sep	13:30	Jordan	0–3	Pakistan	17–25	15–25	19–25			51–75
04 Sep	10:00	Indonesia	3–0	Jordan	25–17	25–22	25–18			75–57
04 Sep	16:30	Japan	3–0	Pakistan	25–16	25–23	25–20			75–59
05 Sep	10:00	Jordan	0–3	Japan	10–25	11–25	8–25			29–75
05 Sep	18:30	Pakistan	3–0	Indonesia	25–21	25–23	25–18			75–62

=== Pool D ===
Pos	Team	Pld	W	L	Pts	SW	SL	SR	SPW	SPL	SPR	Qualification
1	South Korea	3	3	0	6	9	1	9.000	247	157	1.573	Pool F
2	Yemen	3	2	1	5	7	3	2.333	211	211	1.000	Pool H
3	Kuwait	3	1	2	4	3	7	0.429	193	236	0.818	Pool H
4	Sri Lanka	3	0	3	3	1	9	0.111	193	240	0.804	Pool I

Date	Time		Score		Set 1	Set 2	Set 3	Set 4	Set 5	Total
03 Sep	15:00	Yemen	1–3	South Korea	25–22	13–25	9–25	14–25		61–97
03 Sep	21:30	Kuwait	3–1	Sri Lanka	25–19	25–19	15–25	25–23		90–86
04 Sep	11:30	Yemen	3–0	Kuwait	25–21	25–23	25–11			75–55
04 Sep	16:30	South Korea	3–0	Sri Lanka	25–19	25–14	25–15			75–48
05 Sep	10:00	Kuwait	0–3	South Korea	18–25	16–25	14–25			48–75
05 Sep	11:30	Sri Lanka	0–3	Yemen	17–25	20–25	22–25			59–75

== Quarterfinals ==
=== Pool E ===
Pos	Team	Pld	W	L	Pts	SW	SL	SR	SPW	SPL	SPR	Qualification
1	Qatar	3	3	0	6	9	1	9.000	253	212	1.193	Semifinals
2	Japan	3	2	1	5	6	4	1.500	240	225	1.067	Semifinals
3	India	3	1	2	4	5	8	0.625	280	303	0.924	5th–8th place
4	Australia	3	0	3	3	2	9	0.222	225	258	0.872	5th–8th place

Date	Time		Score		Set 1	Set 2	Set 3	Set 4	Set 5	Total
06 Sep	09:00	India	3–2	Australia	25–16	19–25	31–29	18–25	15–6	108–101
06 Sep	18:30	Qatar	3–0	Japan	25–22	26–24	25–19			76–65
07 Sep	09:00	Australia	0–3	Japan	20–25	23–25	22–25			65–75
07 Sep	18:30	Qatar	3–1	India	25–18	24–26	28–26	25–18		102–88
08 Sep	10:30	India	1–3	Japan	25–23	25–27	22–25	12–25		84–100
08 Sep	18:30	Qatar	3–0	Australia	25–18	25–20	25–21			75–59

=== Pool F ===
Pos	Team	Pld	W	L	Pts	SW	SL	SR	SPW	SPL	SPR	Qualification
1	South Korea	3	3	0	6	9	3	3.000	289	232	1.246	Semifinals
2	Iran	3	2	1	5	6	3	2.000	200	182	1.099	Semifinals
3	China	3	1	2	4	5	7	0.714	252	275	0.916	5th–8th place
4	Oman	3	0	3	3	2	9	0.222	213	265	0.804	5th–8th place

Date	Time		Score		Set 1	Set 2	Set 3	Set 4	Set 5	Total
06 Sep	10:30	Iran	0–3	South Korea	19–25	12–25	19–25			50–75
06 Sep	16:30	China	3–1	Oman	25–19	25–20	17–25	25–20		92–84
07 Sep	10:30	Oman	1–3	South Korea	25–23	21–25	13–25	14–25		73–98
07 Sep	16:30	Iran	3–0	China	25–16	25–17	25–18			75–51
08 Sep	09:00	Iran	3–0	Oman	25–20	25–16	25–20			75–56
08 Sep	16:30	China	2–3	South Korea	26–28	16–25	26–24	25–21	16–18	109–116

=== Pool G ===
Pos	Team	Pld	W	L	Pts	SW	SL	SR	SPW	SPL	SPR	Qualification
1	Saudi Arabia	2	2	0	4	6	2	3.000	176	156	1.128	9th–12th place
2	Chinese Taipei	2	1	1	3	5	5	1.000	216	209	1.033	9th–12th place
3	Indonesia	2	1	1	3	5	5	1.000	199	210	0.948	13th–16th place
4	Pakistan	2	0	2	2	2	6	0.333	166	182	0.912	13th–16th place

Date	Time		Score		Set 1	Set 2	Set 3	Set 4	Set 5	Total
06 Sep	10:30	Chinese Taipei	2–3	Indonesia	22–25	24–26	25–12	26–24	12–15	109–102
06 Sep	16:30	Pakistan	0–3	Saudi Arabia	15–25	21–25	23–25			59–75
07 Sep	10:30	Saudi Arabia	3–2	Indonesia	19–25	25–20	25–15	17–25	15–12	101–97
07 Sep	16:30	Chinese Taipei	3–2	Pakistan	20–25	19–25	28–26	25–23	15–8	107–107

=== Pool H ===
Pos	Team	Pld	W	L	Pts	SW	SL	SR	SPW	SPL	SPR	Qualification
1	Thailand	2	2	0	4	6	0	MAX	158	137	1.153	9th–12th place
2	Kuwait	2	1	1	3	3	4	0.750	164	160	1.025	9th–12th place
3	United Arab Emirates	2	0	2	2	2	6	0.333	166	190	0.874	13th–16th place
4	Yemen	2	1	1	3	3	4	0.750	163	164	0.994	13th–16th place

Date	Time		Score		Set 1	Set 2	Set 3	Set 4	Set 5	Total
06 Sep	12:00	Thailand	3–0	Kuwait	25–20	26–24	27–25			78–69
06 Sep	18:30	Yemen	3–1	United Arab Emirates	27–25	25–19	18–25	25–15		95–84
07 Sep	12:00	United Arab Emirates	1–3	Kuwait	18–25	21–25	25–20	18–25		82–95
07 Sep	18:30	Thailand	3–0	Yemen	25–17	25–23	30–28			80–68

=== Pool I ===
Pos	Team	Pld	W	L	Pts	SW	SL	SR	SPW	SPL	SPR
17	Sri Lanka	2	1	1	3	5	4	1.250	207	201	1.030
18	Bahrain	2	1	1	3	4	4	1.000	184	184	1.000
19	Jordan	2	1	1	3	4	5	0.800	193	199	0.970

Date	Time		Score		Set 1	Set 2	Set 3	Set 4	Set 5	Total
06 Sep	09:00	Bahrain	3–1	Jordan	25–21	25–22	18–25	25–15		93–83
07 Sep	09:00	Bahrain	1–3	Sri Lanka	28–26	22–25	21–25	20–25		91–101
08 Sep	09:00	Jordan	3–2	Sri Lanka	25–19	19–25	22–25	29–27	15–10	110–106

== Classification 13th–16th ==
13th–16th places
8 September – Doha
Indonesia	3
United Arab Emirates	2
8 September – Doha
Yemen	0
Pakistan	3

13th place
9 September – Doha
Indonesia	0
Pakistan	3
15th place
9 September – Doha
United Arab Emirates	3
Yemen	1

=== Semifinals ===
Date	Time		Score		Set 1	Set 2	Set 3	Set 4	Set 5	Total
08 Sep	10:30	Indonesia	3–2	United Arab Emirates	28–26	20–25	25–16	25–27	15–11	113–105
08 Sep	12:00	Yemen	0–3	Pakistan	16–25	15–25	15–25			46–75

=== 15th place ===
Date	Time		Score		Set 1	Set 2	Set 3	Set 4	Set 5	Total
09 Sep	10:30	United Arab Emirates	3–1	Yemen	23–25	25–20	25–22	25–18		98–85

=== 13th place ===
Date	Time		Score		Set 1	Set 2	Set 3	Set 4	Set 5	Total
09 Sep	16:30	Indonesia	0–3	Pakistan	11–25	17–25	22–25			50–75

== Classification 9th–12th ==
9th–12th places
8 September – Doha
Saudi Arabia	3
Kuwait	0
8 September – Doha
Thailand	1
Chinese Taipei	3

9th place
9 September – Doha
Saudi Arabia	0
Chinese Taipei	3
11th place
9 September – Doha
Kuwait	0
Thailand	3

=== Semifinals ===
Date	Time		Score		Set 1	Set 2	Set 3	Set 4	Set 5	Total
08 Sep	16:30	Saudi Arabia	3–0	Kuwait	25–18	25–12	25–23			75–53
08 Sep	18:30	Thailand	1–3	Chinese Taipei	16–25	25–14	23–25	18–25		82–89

=== 11th place ===
Date	Time		Score		Set 1	Set 2	Set 3	Set 4	Set 5	Total
09 Sep	16:30	Kuwait	0–3	Thailand	15–25	16–25	16–25			47–75

=== 9th place ===
Date	Time		Score		Set 1	Set 2	Set 3	Set 4	Set 5	Total
09 Sep	18:30	Saudi Arabia	0–3	Chinese Taipei	26–28	28–30	23–25			77–83

== Classification 5th–8th ==
5th–8th places
9 September – Doha
India	3
Oman	0
9 September – Doha
China	3
Australia	1

5th place
10 September – Doha
India	3
China	0
7th place
10 September – Doha
Oman	1
Australia	3

=== Semifinals ===
Date	Time		Score		Set 1	Set 2	Set 3	Set 4	Set 5	Total
09 Sep	09:00	India	3–0	Oman	25–18	25–22	25–20			75–60
09 Sep	10:30	China	3–1	Australia	25–10	21–25	25–18	25–22		96–75

=== 7th place ===
Date	Time		Score		Set 1	Set 2	Set 3	Set 4	Set 5	Total
10 Sep	09:00	Oman	1–3	Australia	25–22	24–26	20–25	19–25		88–98

=== 5th place ===
Date	Time		Score		Set 1	Set 2	Set 3	Set 4	Set 5	Total
10 Sep	09:00	India	3–0	China	25–21	25–15	25–20			75–56

== Final round ==
Semifinals
9 September – Doha
Qatar	1
Iran	3
9 September – Doha
South Korea	3
Japan	2

Final
10 September – Doha
Iran	1
South Korea	3
3rd place
10 September – Doha
Qatar	3
Japan	2

=== Semifinals ===
Date	Time		Score		Set 1	Set 2	Set 3	Set 4	Set 5	Total
09 Sep	16:30	Qatar	1–3	Iran	17–25	25–21	22–25	19–25		83–96
09 Sep	18:30	South Korea	3–2	Japan	15–25	25–20	25–20	15–25	17–15	97–105

=== 3rd place ===
Date	Time		Score		Set 1	Set 2	Set 3	Set 4	Set 5	Total
10 Sep	16:30	Qatar	3–2	Japan	20–25	18–25	25–23	25–22	15–10	103–105

=== Final ===
Date	Time		Score		Set 1	Set 2	Set 3	Set 4	Set 5	Total
10 Sep	19:30	Iran	1–3	South Korea	28–26	19–25	21–25	20–25		88–101

== Final standing ==
Rank	Team
1st place, gold medalist(s)	South Korea
2nd place, silver medalist(s)	Iran
3rd place, bronze medalist(s)	Qatar
4	Japan
5	India
6	China
7	Australia
8	Oman
9	Chinese Taipei
10	Saudi Arabia
11	Thailand
12	Kuwait
13	Pakistan
14	Indonesia
15	United Arab Emirates
16	Yemen
17	Sri Lanka
18	Bahrain
19	Jordan

Qualified for the 2005 World Junior Championship

2004 Asian Junior Men's champions

South Korea
Sixth title

Team Roster
Lee Jong-hwa, Chun Chang-hee, Park Chul-woo, Lim Si-hyoung, You Kwang-woo, Moon Sung-min, Hwang Dong-il, Kang Young-jun, Shin Yung-suk, Park Sung-ryul, Hong Jung-pyo, Kim Dong-kun

Head Coach: Lee Kyung-suk

== Awards ==
- MVP: (Japan) Tatsuya Fukuzawa
- Best scorer: (Japan) Hiromitsu Matsuzaki
- Best spiker: (Iran) Mohammad Soleimani
- Best blocker: (Qatar) Jumah Faraj
- Best server: (South Korea) Lim Si-hyung
- Best setter: (South Korea) You Kwang-woo
- Best digger: (Iran) Arash Sadeghiani
- Best receiver: (Qatar) Salem Mansour
