= Farhad Zarif =

Iranian volleyball player (born 1983)

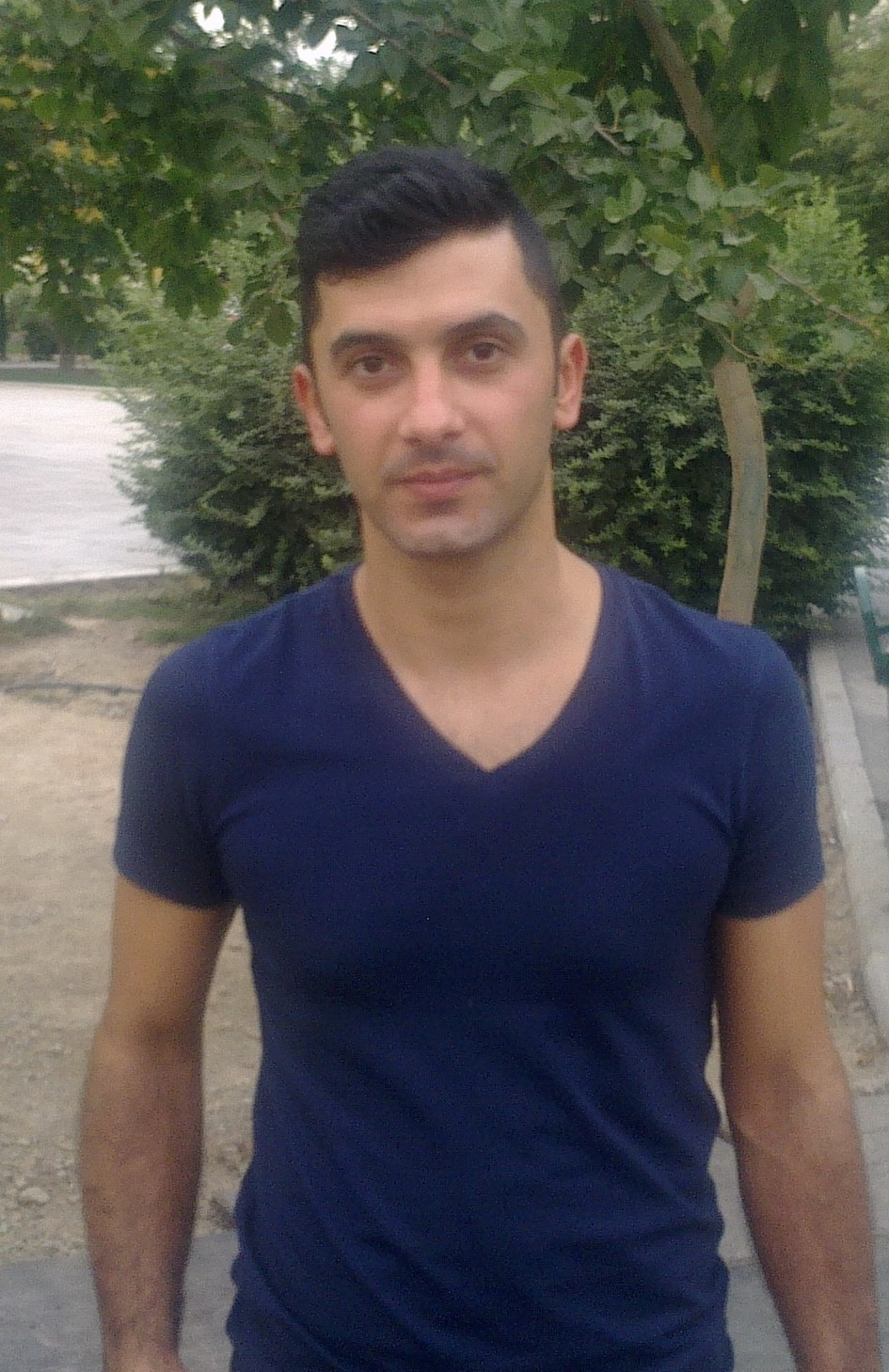

Personal information
- Full name: Farhad Zarif Ahangaran Varzandeh
- Born: 3 March 1983 (age 43); Mashhad, Iran
- Height: 1.65 m (5 ft 5 in)
- Weight: 60 kg (132 lb)
- Spike: 2.90 m (114 in)
- Block: 2.71 m (107 in)

Volleyball information
- Position: Libero
- Current club: (Iran) Paykan Tehran
- Number: 8
Honours
Men's volleyball
Representing Iran
Asian Games
Gold medal – first place	2014 Incheon	Team
Asian Championship
Gold medal – first place	2011 Tehran	Team
Gold medal – first place	2013 Dubai	Team
U19 World Championship
Silver medal – second place	2001 Cairo	Team

Farhad Zarif (Persian: فرهاد ظریف; born 3 March 1983 in Mashhad) is an Iranian professional volleyball player who plays for Paykan Tehran. He was previously on the Iranian national team.

== Honours ==
=== National team ===
- Asian Championship
  - Gold medal (2): 2011, 2013
- Asian Games
  - Gold medal (1): 2014
- Asian Junior Championship
  - Gold medal (1): 2002
- Asian Youth Championship
  - Gold medal (1): 2001
- World Youth Championship
  - Silver medal (1): 2001

=== Club ===
- Asian Championship
  - Gold medal (2): 2016, 2017 (Sarmayeh Bank)

== Individual awards ==
- Best digger: 2001 Asian Youth Championship
- Best receiver: 2001 World Youth Championship
- Best receiver: 2002 Asian Junior Championship
- Best receiver: 2003 World Junior Championship
- Best libero: 2006 Asian Club Championship
- Best libero: 2007 Asian Club Championship
- Best libero: 2009 Asian Club Championship
- Best libero: 2011 Asian Championship
- Best libero: 2012 Olympic Qualification Tournament
- Best libero: 2013 Asian Championship
- Best libero: 2013 FIVB World Grand Champions Cup

Awards
Preceded by (Brazil) Sérgio Santos	Best Libero of FIVB World Grand Champions Cup; 2013	Succeeded by (Japan) Satoshi Ide
