= Mohammad Javad Manavinejad =

Iranian volleyball player (born 1995)

MohammadJavad Manavinezhad
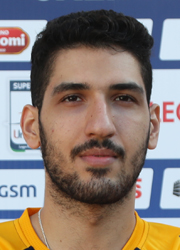

Personal information
- Full name: MohammadJavad Manavinejad
- Born: November 27, 1995 (age 30) isfahan, Iran
- Height: 1.98 m (6 ft 6 in)
- Weight: 90 kg (200 lb)
- Spike: 3.65 m (144 in)
- Block: 13.25 m (522 in)

Volleyball information
- Position: Outside spiker
- Current club: emmavillas siena

Career
Years	Teams
2011–2012; 2012–2013; 2013–2017; 2017–2019; 2019–2021; 2021–2022; 2023–	(Iran) Raho Tarabari Esfahan (Iran) Novin Keshavarz Tehran (Iran) Paykan Tehran (Italy) BluVolley Verona (Iran) Saipa Tehran (France) Stade Poitevin Poitiers (Indonesia) Jakarta Bhayangkara Presisi

National team
2012–2013; 2013–2015; 2015–2015; 2015–	Iran U19; Iran U21; Iran U23; Iran
Honours
Representing Iran
Men's volleyball
World Grand Champions Cup
Bronze medal – third place	2017 Japan	Team
Asian Games
Gold medal – first place	2018 Jakarta–Palembang	Team
Asian U23 Championship
Gold medal – first place	2015 Myanmar	Team
Asian U20 Championship
Gold medal – first place	2014 Bahrain	Team
Asian U18 Championship
Gold medal – first place	2012 Tehran	Team

Mohammad Javad Manavinejad or Manavinezhad (Persian: محمدجواد معنوی‌نژاد, born 27 November 1995 in isfahan) is an Iranian volleyball player who plays as an outside spiker for the Iranian national team and Indonesian club Jakarta Bhayangkara Presisi.

Manavinejad in 2015 year invited to Iran senior national team by Slobodan Kovac and made his debut match against United States in the 2015 World League.

Manavinejad with U21 Iran national team won gold the medal in Asian U20 Championship and selected Most Valuable Player. He had a great performance in 2017 World League for Iran national volleyball team. Manavinejad joined BluVolley Verona in 2017, with a two-year contract.

== Honours ==
=== National team ===
- World Grand Champions Cup
  - Bronze medal (1): 2017
- Asian Games
  - Gold medal (1): 2018
- Asian U23 Championship
  - Gold medal (1): 2015
- Asian U20 Championship
  - Gold medal (1): 2014
- Asian U18 Championship
  - Gold medal (1): 2012

=== Club ===
- Iranian Super League
  - Champions (1): 2015 (Paykan)
- Asian Club Championship
  - Runner-up (1): 2023 (Jakarta Bhayangkara Presisi)

=== Individual ===
- Most valuable player: 2014 Asian U20 Championship
- Best outside hitter: 2023 Asian Club Championship
