= 2024 Asian Men's U20 Volleyball Championship =

Volleyball competition held in Indonesia

Tournament details
- Host country: Indonesia
- City: Surabaya
- Dates: 23–30 July
- Teams: 16 (from 1 confederation)
- Venue: 2 (in 1 host city)

Final positions
- Champions: Iran (8th title)
- Runners-up: South Korea
- Third place: Japan
- Fourth place: Indonesia

Tournament awards
- MVP: (Iran) Pouya Ariakhah
- Best Setter: (Iran) Emran Kook Jili
- Best OH: (Japan) Shunta Ono; (South Korea) Lee Woo-jin
- Best MB: (Iran) Taha Behboudnia; (Iran) Armin Ghelichniazi
- Best OPP: (Indonesia) Dawuda Alaihi
- Best Libero: (South Korea) Kang Seung-il

Tournament statistics
- Matches played: 56
- Attendance: 32,270 (576 per match)

The 2024 Asian Men's U20 Volleyball Championship was the 22nd edition of the Asian Men's U20 Volleyball Championship, a biennial international volleyball tournament organised by the Asian Volleyball Confederation (AVC) with Indonesian Volleyball Federation (PBVSI). The tournament took place in Surabaya, Indonesia from 23 to 30 July.

This tournament served as the qualification tournament for the FIVB Volleyball Men's U21 World Championship. The top four teams of the tournament qualified for the 2025 FIVB Volleyball Men's U21 World Championship as the AVC representatives.

Players must be born on or after January 1, 2005. Players who had played twice in the FIVB Junior (U20 or U21) Championships cannot play in AVC U20 Championship as it is a qualification event for the following year of FIVB U21 event.

Iran won their eighth title of the tournament after defeating South Korea in straight sets (3–0) in the final. Japan defeated Indonesia in the third place match (3–1). Pouya Ariakhah of Iran named the MVP of the tournament.

== Host selection ==
Chinese Taipei was originally going to host the Asian Men's U20 Championship, but then host changed and Indonesia became the host.

== Qualification ==
The 16 AVC member associations submitted their U20 men's national team to the 2024 Asian U20 Championship. The 16 AVC member associations were from 5 zonal associations, including, Central Asia (4 teams), East Asia (5 teams), Oceania (1 teams), Southeast Asia (3 teams) and West Asia (3 teams).

=== Central Asian qualification ===
Date	Time		Score		Set 1	Set 2	Set 3	Set 4	Set 5	Total	Report
12 Jun		Kazakhstan	3–0	Uzbekistan	25–16	25–15	25–21			75–52	Report

=== East Asian qualification ===
Date	Time		Score		Set 1	Set 2	Set 3	Set 4	Set 5	Total	Report
20 Apr	18.00	Hong Kong	3–1	Macau	26–28	29–27	25–14	25–20		105–89	

=== Southeast Asian qualification ===
Date	Time		Score		Set 1	Set 2	Set 3	Set 4	Set 5	Total	Report
25 Jun	16.30	Cambodia	2–3	Vietnam	25–21	16–25	25–20	22–25	5–15	93–106	

=== Oceania qualification ===
Date	Time		Score		Set 1	Set 2	Set 3	Set 4	Set 5	Total	Report
8 Jun		Australia	3–1	New Zealand	25–20	25–21	23–25	25–20		98–86	Report
9 Jun		Australia	3–2	New Zealand	25–21	21–25	25–14	23–25	15–10	109–95	Report
10 Jun		Australia	1–3	New Zealand	16–25	25–16	20–25	21–25		82–91	Report

=== Qualified teams ===
The following teams qualified for the tournament.

Means of qualification	Berths	Qualified
Host country	1	Indonesia
Central Asian teams	4	Bangladesh
Central Asian teams	4	India
Central Asian teams	4	Iran
Central Asian teams	4	Kazakhstan
East Asian teams	5	China
East Asian teams	5	Chinese Taipei
East Asian teams	5	Japan
East Asian teams	5	South Korea
East Asian teams	5	Hong Kong
Oceanian teams	1	Australia
Southeast Asian teams	2	Thailand
Southeast Asian teams	2	Vietnam
West Asian teams	3	Kuwait
West Asian teams	3	Qatar
West Asian teams	3	Saudi Arabia
Total 16

== Pools composition ==
The overview of pools was released on 12 March 2024.

Pool A	Pool B	Pool C	Pool D
Indonesia (Hosts)	Iran (1)	India (2)	South Korea (3)
Saudi Arabia (9)	China (6)	Bangladesh (5)	Thailand (4)
Hong Kong	Chinese Taipei (14)	Japan (13)	Kazakhstan
Australia	Qatar (11)	Kuwait	Vietnam

== Format ==
In preliminary round, all teams are divided into four pools (A, B, C, & D) with four teams each. The teams battled in a single round-robin with the top two teams in each pool qualified to 1st–8th classification while bottom two teams qualified to 9th–16th classification.

In classification round, all teams in each pools (E, F, G, & H) battle again in a single round-robin where top two teams in pools E and F qualify to semifinals and the two bottom teams qualify to 5th–8th places, while the top two teams in pools G and H qualify to 9th–12th places and 13th–16th places, respectively. Teams who faced each other in the preliminary will not play again rather their win-loss record will carry over.

In final round, the teams battle in knockout format.

== Venues ==
Preliminary, Classification, 1st–8th places	Preliminary, Classification, 9th–16th places
Surabaya, Indonesia
DBL Arena	Gelora Pancasila
Capacity: 5,000	Capacity: —

== Pool standing procedure ==
1. Number of victories
2. Match points
3. Sets quotient
4. Points quotient
5. If the tie continues as per the point quotient between two teams, the priority will be given to the team which won the last match between them. When the tie in points ratio is between three or more teams, a new classification of these teams in the terms of points 1, 2 and 3 will be made taking into consideration only the matches in which they were opposed to each other.

Match won 3–0 or 3–1: 3 match points for the winner, 0 match points for the loser.
Match won 3–2: 2 match points for the winner, 1 match point for the loser.
Match forfeited: 0 point (25–0;25-0;25-0)

== Preliminary round ==
- All times are Western Indonesian Time (UTC+07:00).

=== Pool A ===
Pos	Team	Pld	W	L	Pts	SW	SL	SR	SPW	SPL	SPR	Qualification
1	Indonesia (H)	3	3	0	9	9	1	9.000	248	186	1.333	Pool E
2	Saudi Arabia	3	2	1	6	6	3	2.000	205	209	0.981	Pool E
3	Hong Kong	3	1	2	3	3	6	0.500	183	220	0.832	Pool G
4	Australia	3	0	3	0	1	9	0.111	231	252	0.917	Pool G

Source: Daily Bulletin No.4
(H) Host

Date	Time	Venue		Score		Set 1	Set 2	Set 3	Set 4	Set 5	Total	Report
23 Jul	12:00	DBL	Saudi Arabia	3–0	Australia	25–23	28–26	25–23			78–72	Report
23 Jul	19:00	DBL	Hong Kong	0–3	Indonesia	10–25	21–25	14–25			45–75	Report
24 Jul	13:30	DBL	Hong Kong	3–0	Australia	25–23	25–23	26–24			76–70	Report
24 Jul	19:00	DBL	Indonesia	3–0	Saudi Arabia	25–20	25–13	25–19			75–52	Report
25 Jul	13:30	DBL	Hong Kong	0–3	Saudi Arabia	19–25	22–25	21–25			62–75	Report
25 Jul	19:00	DBL	Australia	1–3	Indonesia	25–23	21–25	23–25	20–25		89–98	Report

=== Pool B ===
Pos	Team	Pld	W	L	Pts	SW	SL	SR	SPW	SPL	SPR	Qualification
1	Iran	3	3	0	9	9	0	MAX	229	142	1.613	Pool F
2	China	3	2	1	6	6	4	1.500	236	202	1.168	Pool F
3	Chinese Taipei	3	1	2	3	4	6	0.667	205	219	0.936	Pool H
4	Qatar	3	0	3	0	0	9	0.000	118	225	0.524	Pool H

Source: Daily Bulletin No.4

Date	Time	Venue		Score		Set 1	Set 2	Set 3	Set 4	Set 5	Total	Report
23 Jul	09:30	DBL	Qatar	0–3	Chinese Taipei	16–25	13–25	20–25			49–75	Report
23 Jul	14:30	DBL	Iran	3–0	China	29–27	25–21	25–18			79–66	Report
24 Jul	11:00	DBL	Qatar	0–3	China	10–25	13–25	14–25			37–75	Report
24 Jul	16:30	DBL	Chinese Taipei	0–3	Iran	13–25	12–25	19–25			44–75	Report
25 Jul	11:00	DBL	China	3–1	Chinese Taipei	25–21	20–25	25–19	25–21		95–86	Report
25 Jul	16:30	DBL	Qatar	0–3	Iran	11–25	10–25	11–25			32–75	Report

=== Pool C ===
Pos	Team	Pld	W	L	Pts	SW	SL	SR	SPW	SPL	SPR	Qualification
1	Japan	3	3	0	8	9	2	4.500	257	179	1.436	Pool E
2	India	3	2	1	6	8	6	1.333	276	251	1.100	Pool E
3	Bangladesh	3	1	2	4	5	6	0.833	219	219	1.000	Pool G
4	Kuwait	3	0	3	0	0	9	0.000	122	225	0.542	Pool G

Source: Daily Bulletin No.4

Date	Time	Venue		Score		Set 1	Set 2	Set 3	Set 4	Set 5	Total	Report
23 Jul	11:00	GP	Japan	3–0	Kuwait	25–15	25–14	25–12			75–41	Report
23 Jul	13:30	GP	India	3–2	Bangladesh	21–25	21–25	25–23	25–15	15–12	107–100	Report
24 Jul	11:00	GP	Japan	3–0	Bangladesh	25–7	25–22	25–15			75–44	Report
24 Jul	13:30	GP	Kuwait	0–3	India	14–25	12–25	18–25			44–75	Report
25 Jul	11:00	GP	Bangladesh	3–0	Kuwait	25–15	25–11	25–11			75–37	Report
25 Jul	13:30	GP	Japan	3–2	India	25–14	25–15	25–27	17–25	15–13	107–94	Report

=== Pool D ===
Pos	Team	Pld	W	L	Pts	SW	SL	SR	SPW	SPL	SPR	Qualification
1	South Korea	3	3	0	9	9	2	4.500	266	227	1.172	Pool F
2	Kazakhstan	3	2	1	5	7	6	1.167	280	296	0.946	Pool F
3	Vietnam	3	1	2	2	4	8	0.500	260	265	0.981	Pool H
4	Thailand	3	0	3	2	5	9	0.556	298	316	0.943	Pool H

Source: Daily Bulletin No.4

Date	Time	Venue		Score		Set 1	Set 2	Set 3	Set 4	Set 5	Total	Report
23 Jul	16:30	GP	Thailand	2–3	Kazakhstan	23–25	25–19	25–19	29–31	9–15	111–109	Report
23 Jul	19:00	GP	Vietnam	0–3	South Korea	22–25	20–25	17–25			59–75	Report
24 Jul	16:30	GP	Thailand	1–3	South Korea	25–22	22–25	23–25	22–25		92–97	Report
24 Jul	19:00	GP	Kazakhstan	3–1	Vietnam	20–25	25–22	25–22	25–22		95–91	Report
25 Jul	16:30	GP	Thailand	2–3	Vietnam	12–25	25–23	22–25	25–22	11–15	95–110	Report
25 Jul	19:00	GP	South Korea	3–1	Kazakhstan	25–18	19–25	25–20	25–13		94–76	Report

== Classification round ==
- All times are Western Indonesian Time (UTC+07:00).
- The results and the points of the matches between the same teams that were already played during the preliminary round shall be taken into account for the classification round.

=== Pool E ===
Pos	Team	Pld	W	L	Pts	SW	SL	SR	SPW	SPL	SPR	Qualification
1	Japan	3	3	0	8	9	2	4.500	260	213	1.221	Final four
2	Indonesia (H)	3	2	1	6	6	4	1.500	235	216	1.088	Final four
3	India	3	1	2	4	6	7	0.857	290	296	0.980	5th–8th places
4	Saudi Arabia	3	0	3	0	1	9	0.111	200	260	0.769	5th–8th places

Source: Bulletin No.6
(H) Host

Date	Time	Venue		Score		Set 1	Set 2	Set 3	Set 4	Set 5	Total	Report
27 Jul	16:30	DBL	Japan	3–0	Saudi Arabia	25–14	25–13	25–23			75–50	Report
27 Jul	19:00	DBL	Indonesia	3–1	India	25–20	25–23	16–25	25–18		91–86	Report
28 Jul	16:30	DBL	Saudi Arabia	1–3	India	22–25	29–27	16–25	31–33		98–110	Report
28 Jul	19:00	DBL	Indonesia	0–3	Japan	26–28	22–25	21–25			69–78	Report

=== Pool F ===
Pos	Team	Pld	W	L	Pts	SW	SL	SR	SPW	SPL	SPR	Qualification
1	Iran	3	3	0	8	9	2	4.500	266	226	1.177	Final four
2	South Korea	3	2	1	7	8	5	1.600	292	267	1.094	Final four
3	Kazakhstan	3	1	2	3	4	6	0.667	213	236	0.903	5th–8th places
4	China	3	0	3	0	1	9	0.111	212	254	0.835	5th–8th places

Source: Bulletin No.6

Date	Time	Venue		Score		Set 1	Set 2	Set 3	Set 4	Set 5	Total	Report
27 Jul	11:00	DBL	Iran	3–0	Kazakhstan	25–21	25–16	25–22			75–59	Report
27 Jul	13:30	DBL	South Korea	3–1	China	25–16	25–20	22–25	25–18		97–79	Report
28 Jul	11:00	DBL	China	0–3	Kazakhstan	26–28	21–25	20–25			67–78	Report
28 Jul	13:30	DBL	Iran	3–2	South Korea	25–22	25–20	24–26	23–25	15–8	112–101	Report

=== Pool G ===
Pos	Team	Pld	W	L	Pts	SW	SL	SR	SPW	SPL	SPR	Qualification
1	Australia	3	2	1	6	6	3	2.000	226	193	1.171	9th–12th places
2	Hong Kong	3	2	1	5	7	5	1.400	277	261	1.061	9th–12th places
3	Bangladesh	3	1	2	4	5	6	0.833	239	226	1.058	13th–16th places
4	Kuwait	3	1	2	3	3	7	0.429	181	243	0.745	13th–16th places

Source: Bulletin No.6

Date	Time	Venue		Score		Set 1	Set 2	Set 3	Set 4	Set 5	Total	Report
27 Jul	11:00	GP	Hong Kong	1–3	Kuwait	22–25	25–18	24–26	22–25		93–94	Report
27 Jul	13:30	GP	Bangladesh	0–3	Australia	17–25	29–31	21–25			67–81	Report
28 Jul	11:00	GP	Australia	3–0	Kuwait	25–15	25–13	25–22			75–50	Report
28 Jul	13:30	GP	Hong Kong	3–2	Bangladesh	25–15	20–25	23–25	25-22	15-10	108–65	Report

=== Pool H ===
Pos	Team	Pld	W	L	Pts	SW	SL	SR	SPW	SPL	SPR	Qualification
1	Chinese Taipei	3	2	1	7	8	3	2.667	256	231	1.108	9th–12th places
2	Thailand	3	2	1	6	8	5	1.600	205	213	0.962	9th–12th places
3	Vietnam	3	2	1	5	6	5	1.200	257	221	1.163	13th–16th places
4	Qatar	3	0	3	0	0	9	0.000	97	150	0.647	13th–16th places

Source: Bulletin No.6

Date	Time	Venue		Score		Set 1	Set 2	Set 3	Set 4	Set 5	Total	Report
27 Jul	16:30	GP	Chinese Taipei	2–3	Thailand	20–25	23–25	26–24	25–21	9–15	103–110	Report
27 Jul	19:00	GP	Vietnam	3–0	Qatar	25–12	25–22	25–14			75–48	Report
28 Jul	16:30	GP	Qatar	0–3	Thailand	15–25	11–25	13–25			39–75	Report
28 Jul	19:00	GP	Chinese Taipei	3–0	Vietnam	26–24	27–25	25–23			78–72	Report

== Final round ==
- All times are Western Indonesian Time (UTC+07:00).

=== 13th–16th places ===
13th–16th semifinals
29 July
Bangladesh	3
Qatar	0
29 July
Vietnam	3
Kuwait	0

13th place match
30 July
Bangladesh	0
Vietnam	3
15th place match
30 July
Qatar	1
Kuwait	3

==== 13th–16th semifinals ====
Date	Time	Venue		Score		Set 1	Set 2	Set 3	Set 4	Set 5	Total	Report
29 Jul	11:00	GP	Bangladesh	3–0	Qatar	25–13	25–18	25–23			75–54	Report
29 Jul	13:30	GP	Vietnam	3–0	Kuwait	25–14	25–16	27–25			77–55	Report

==== 15th place match ====
Date	Time	Venue		Score		Set 1	Set 2	Set 3	Set 4	Set 5	Total	Report
30 Jul	10:00	GP	Qatar	1–3	Kuwait	27–25	17–25	22–25	23–25		89–100	Report

==== 13th place match ====
Date	Time	Venue		Score		Set 1	Set 2	Set 3	Set 4	Set 5	Total	Report
30 Jul	12:30	GP	Bangladesh	0–3	Vietnam	18–25	19–25	16–25			53–75	Report

=== 9th–12th places ===
9th–12th semifinals
29 July
Australia	0
Thailand	3
29 July
Chinese Taipei	3
Hong Kong	0

9th place match
30 July
Thailand	3
Chinese Taipei	0
11th place match
30 July
Australia	3
Hong Kong	1

==== 9th–12th semifinals ====
Date	Time	Venue		Score		Set 1	Set 2	Set 3	Set 4	Set 5	Total	Report
29 Jul	16:30	GP	Australia	0–3	Thailand	14–25	15–25	23–25			52–75	Report
29 Jul	19:00	GP	Chinese Taipei	3–0	Hong Kong	25–22	25–19	25–20			75–61	Report

==== 11th place match ====
Date	Time	Venue		Score		Set 1	Set 2	Set 3	Set 4	Set 5	Total	Report
30 Jul	15:30	GP	Australia	3–1	Hong Kong	27–25	22–25	25–19	25–21		99–90	Report

==== 9th place match ====
Date	Time	Venue		Score		Set 1	Set 2	Set 3	Set 4	Set 5	Total	Report
30 Jul	18:00	GP	Thailand	3–0	Chinese Taipei	26–24	26–24	25–20			77–68	Report

=== 5th–8th semifinals ===
5th–8th semifinals
29 July
India	3
China	1
29 July
Kazakhstan	3
Saudi Arabia	0

5th place match
30 July
India	2
Kazakhstan	3
7th place match
30 July
China	3
Saudi Arabia	0

==== 5th–8th semifinals ====
Date	Time	Venue		Score		Set 1	Set 2	Set 3	Set 4	Set 5	Total	Report
29 Jul	11:00	DBL	India	3–1	China	25–22	19–25	25–20	25–22		94–89	Report
29 Jul	13:30	DBL	Kazakhstan	3–0	Saudi Arabia	25–15	25–17	25–18			75–50	Report

==== 7th place match ====
Date	Time	Venue		Score		Set 1	Set 2	Set 3	Set 4	Set 5	Total	Report
30 Jul	11:00	DBL	China	3–0	Saudi Arabia	25–20	25–15	25–21			75–56	Report

==== 5th place match ====
Date	Time	Venue		Score		Set 1	Set 2	Set 3	Set 4	Set 5	Total	Report
30 Jul	13:30	DBL	India	2–3	Kazakhstan	29–31	25–20	25–23	23–25	10–15	112–114	Report

=== Final four ===
Semifinals
29 July
Japan	2
South Korea	3
29 July
Iran	3
Indonesia	0

Final
30 July
South Korea	0
Iran	3
3rd place match
30 July
Japan	3
Indonesia	1

==== Semifinals ====
Date	Time	Venue		Score		Set 1	Set 2	Set 3	Set 4	Set 5	Total	Report
29 Jul	16:30	DBL	Japan	2–3	South Korea	20–25	19–25	25–21	25–21	11–15	100–107	Report
29 Jul	19:00	DBL	Iran	3–0	Indonesia	25–21	25–14	25–16			75–51	Report

==== 3rd place match ====
Date	Time	Venue		Score		Set 1	Set 2	Set 3	Set 4	Set 5	Total	Report
30 Jul	16:30	DBL	Japan	3–1	Indonesia	23–25	27–25	25–18	25–20		100–88	Report

==== Final ====
Date	Time	Venue		Score		Set 1	Set 2	Set 3	Set 4	Set 5	Total	Report
30 Jul	19:00	DBL	South Korea	0–3	Iran	12–25	18–25	22–25			52–75	Report

== Final standing ==
Rank	Team
1st place, gold medalist(s)	Iran
2nd place, silver medalist(s)	South Korea
3rd place, bronze medalist(s)	Japan
4	Indonesia
5	Kazakhstan
6	India
7	China
8	Saudi Arabia
9	Thailand
10	Chinese Taipei
11	Australia
12	Hong Kong
13	Vietnam
14	Bangladesh
15	Kuwait
16	Qatar

Qualified for the 2025 U21 World Championship
Qualified for the 2025 U21 World Championship as defending champions
Qualified for the 2025 U21 World Championship as hosts
Qualified for the 2025 U21 World Championship via world ranking

2024 Asian Men's U20 champions

Iran
Eighth title

12–man roster
Taha Behboudnia, Emran Kook Jili (c), Morteza Narimani, Seyed Morteza Tabatabaei, Abolfazl Mahdian, Pouya Ariakhah, Seyed Matin Hosseini Tolouti, Ali Eshghinour, Shayan Mehrabi, Ariyan Mahmoudi Nejad, Matin Soghli, Armin Ghelichniazi
Head coach
Gholamreza Momeni Moghaddam

== Awards ==
- Most valuable player
  Pouya Ariakhah (IRI)
- Best setter
  Emran Kook Jili (IRI)
- Best outside spikers
  Shunta Ono (JPN)
  Lee Woo-jin (KOR)
- Best middle blockers
  Taha Behboudnia (IRI)
  Armin Ghelichniazi (IRI)
- Best opposite spiker
  Dawuda Alaihi (INA)
- Best libero
  Kang Seung-il (KOR)

== Qualified teams for FIVB U21 World Championship ==
The following teams from AVC qualified for the 2025 FIVB Volleyball Men's U21 World Championship.

Team	Qualified on	Previous appearances in the FIVB Volleyball Men's U21 World Championship^{1}
Iran	28 March 2024	14 (1993, 1997, 1999, 2003, 2005, 2007, 2009, 2011, 2013, 2015, 2017, **2019**, 2021, **2023**)
South Korea	27 July 2024	13 (1977, 1981, 1985, **1987**, 1989, 1991, 1993, 1995, 1999, 2001, 2003, 2005, 2019)
Japan	27 July 2024	13 (1977, 1981, 1985, 1987, 1989, 1991, 1993, 2001, 2007, 2011, 2013, 2015, 2017)
Indonesia	27 July 2024	1 (1989)
Kazakhstan	30 July 2024	0 (None)

^{1} Bold indicates champions for that year.

== See also ==
- 2024 Asian Women's U20 Volleyball Championship
- 2024 Asian Men's U18 Volleyball Championship
