= 2014 Asian Men's U20 Volleyball Championship =

2014 Asian Men's U20 Championship
Tournament details
- Host country: Bahrain
- Dates: 17–25 October
- Teams: 18
- Venues: 2 (in 1 host city)

Final positions
- Champions: Iran (5th title)

Tournament awards
- MVP: (Iran) Mohammad Javad Manavinejad

The 2014 Asian Men's U20 Volleyball Championship was held in Manama, Bahrain from 17 to 25 October 2014. 20 teams entered for the tournament which 2 of them withdrew.

== Pools composition ==
Teams were seeded in the first three positions of each pool following the Serpentine system according to their final standing of the 2012 edition. AVC reserved the right to seed the hosts as head of Pool A regardless of the final standing of the 2012 edition. All teams not seeded were drawn. Final standing of the 2012 edition are shown in brackets except Hosts.

Pool A	Pool B	Pool C	Pool D
Bahrain (Hosts)	Japan (1)	China (2)	Iran (3)
~~Australia (7)~~ *	Chinese Taipei (6)	South Korea (5)	India (4)
Thailand (8)	Kazakhstan (9)	Sri Lanka (10)	Turkmenistan (11)
Maldives (–)	Uzbekistan (12)	~~Pakistan (–)~~ *	Hong Kong (–)
Saudi Arabia (–)	Kuwait (–)	New Zealand (–)	Qatar (–)

* Withdrew

== Preliminary round ==
- All times are Arabia Standard Time (UTC+03:00).

=== Pool A ===
Pos	Team	Pld	W	L	Pts	SW	SL	SR	SPW	SPL	SPR	Qualification
1	Bahrain	3	3	0	9	9	2	4.500	268	190	1.411	Quarterfinals
2	Thailand	3	2	1	5	7	5	1.400	274	211	1.299	Quarterfinals
3	Saudi Arabia	3	1	2	4	6	6	1.000	247	266	0.929	9th–16th quarterfinals
4	Maldives	3	0	3	0	0	9	0.000	105	227	0.463	9th–16th quarterfinals

Date	Time		Score		Set 1	Set 2	Set 3	Set 4	Set 5	Total	Report
17 Oct	19:00	Maldives	0–3	Bahrain	12–25	8–25	9–25			29–75	Report
18 Oct	18:30	Saudi Arabia	1–3	Bahrain	9–25	18–25	26–24	18–25		71–99	Report
19 Oct	12:00	Thailand	3–0	Maldives	25–7	25–4	25–7			75–18	Report
20 Oct	14:00	Thailand	3–2	Saudi Arabia	21–25	23–25	25–20	25–18	15–11	109–99	Report
21 Oct	12:00	Maldives	0–3	Saudi Arabia	25–27	15–25	18–25			58–77	Report
21 Oct	18:30	Thailand	1–3	Bahrain	25–18	19–25	22–25	24–26		90–94	Report

=== Pool B ===
Pos	Team	Pld	W	L	Pts	SW	SL	SR	SPW	SPL	SPR	Qualification
1	Japan	4	4	0	12	12	0	MAX	302	183	1.650	Quarterfinals
2	Chinese Taipei	4	3	1	9	9	4	2.250	311	258	1.205	Quarterfinals
3	Kazakhstan	4	2	2	6	6	7	0.857	285	296	0.963	9th–16th quarterfinals
4	Uzbekistan	4	1	3	3	5	9	0.556	291	331	0.879	9th–16th quarterfinals
5	Kuwait	4	0	4	0	0	12	0.000	182	303	0.601	17th–18th places

Date	Time		Score		Set 1	Set 2	Set 3	Set 4	Set 5	Total	Report
17 Oct	10:00	Kazakhstan	3–1	Uzbekistan	21–25	25–20	25–20	25–20		96–85	Report
17 Oct	12:00	Kuwait	0–3	Japan	10–25	13–25	5–25			28–75	Report
18 Oct	14:00	Kazakhstan	3–0	Kuwait	25–23	25–22	25–14			75–59	Report
18 Oct	16:00	Chinese Taipei	0–3	Japan	21–25	11–25	25–27			57–77	Report
19 Oct	16:00	Chinese Taipei	3–0	Kazakhstan	25–15	27–25	25–21			77–61	Report
19 Oct	18:30	Uzbekistan	3–0	Kuwait	27–25	26–24	25–9			78–58	Report
20 Oct	16:00	Japan	3–0	Kazakhstan	25–16	25–19	25–18			75–53	Report
20 Oct	16:00	Uzbekistan	1–3	Chinese Taipei	11–25	25–23	20–25	27–29		83–102	Report
21 Oct	16:00	Japan	3–0	Uzbekistan	25–16	25–13	25–16			75–45	Report
21 Oct	16:00	Kuwait	0–3	Chinese Taipei	14–25	6–25	17–25			37–75	Report

=== Pool C ===
Pos	Team	Pld	W	L	Pts	SW	SL	SR	SPW	SPL	SPR	Qualification
1	China	3	3	0	9	9	0	MAX	226	156	1.449	Quarterfinals
2	South Korea	3	2	1	6	6	3	2.000	199	183	1.087	Quarterfinals
3	Sri Lanka	3	1	2	3	3	6	0.500	191	218	0.876	9th–16th quarterfinals
4	New Zealand	3	0	3	0	0	9	0.000	166	225	0.738	9th–16th quarterfinals

Date	Time		Score		Set 1	Set 2	Set 3	Set 4	Set 5	Total	Report
17 Oct	12:00	New Zealand	0–3	South Korea	16–25	14–25	20–25			50–75	Report
18 Oct	16:00	New Zealand	0–3	China	18–25	18–25	13–25			49–75	Report
19 Oct	12:00	South Korea	0–3	China	15–25	18–25	16–25			49–75	Report
19 Oct	16:30	Sri Lanka	3–0	New Zealand	25–22	25–23	25–22			75–67	Report
20 Oct	18:30	South Korea	3–0	Sri Lanka	25–21	25–19	25–18			75–58	Report
21 Oct	18:30	China	3–0	Sri Lanka	26–24	25–18	25–16			76–58	Report

=== Pool D ===
Pos	Team	Pld	W	L	Pts	SW	SL	SR	SPW	SPL	SPR	Qualification
1	Iran	4	4	0	12	12	2	6.000	351	255	1.376	Quarterfinals
2	Qatar	4	3	1	8	10	5	2.000	362	313	1.157	Quarterfinals
3	India	4	2	2	7	8	6	1.333	309	277	1.116	9th–16th quarterfinals
4	Turkmenistan	4	1	3	3	3	10	0.300	228	314	0.726	9th–16th quarterfinals
5	Hong Kong	4	0	4	0	2	12	0.167	252	343	0.735	17th–18th places

Date	Time		Score		Set 1	Set 2	Set 3	Set 4	Set 5	Total	Report
17 Oct	10:00	Turkmenistan	0–3	India	12–25	16–25	17–25			45–75	Report
17 Oct	14:00	Hong Kong	1–3	Iran	25–23	10–25	18–25	11–25		64–98	Report
18 Oct	14:00	Turkmenistan	3–1	Hong Kong	20–25	25–23	25–16	25–19		95–83	Report
18 Oct	18:30	Qatar	1–3	Iran	20–25	25–22	25–27	27–29		97–103	Report
19 Oct	14:00	Qatar	3–0	Turkmenistan	25–13	31–29	25–10			81–52	Report
19 Oct	14:00	India	3–0	Hong Kong	25–13	25–13	25–22			75–48	Report
20 Oct	14:00	India	2–3	Qatar	25–23	18–25	25–21	20–25	13–15	101–109	Report
20 Oct	18:30	Iran	3–0	Turkmenistan	25–16	25–11	25–9			75–36	Report
21 Oct	14:00	Iran	3–0	India	25–14	25–21	25–23			75–58	Report
21 Oct	14:00	Hong Kong	0–3	Qatar	20–25	21–25	16–25			57–75	Report

== Final round ==
- All times are Arabia Standard Time (UTC+03:00).

=== 17th–18th places ===
Date	Time		Score		Set 1	Set 2	Set 3	Set 4	Set 5	Total	Report
24 Oct	10:00	Kuwait	0–3	Hong Kong	16–25	15–25	22–25			53–75	Report

=== 9th–16th places ===
9th–16th quarterfinals
23 October
Saudi Arabia	3
Turkmenistan	0
23 October
India	3
Uzbekistan	0
23 October
Kazakhstan	3
New Zealand	2
23 October
Sri Lanka	3
Maldives	0

9th–12th semifinals
24 October
Saudi Arabia	1
India	3
24 October
Kazakhstan	3
Sri Lanka	1

9th place match
25 October
India	3
Kazakhstan	1
11th place match
25 October
Saudi Arabia	1
Sri Lanka	3

13th–16th semifinals
24 October
Turkmenistan	3
Uzbekistan	1
24 October
New Zealand	3
Maldives	0

13th place match
25 October
Turkmenistan	3
New Zealand	2
15th place match
25 October
Uzbekistan	0
Maldives	3

==== 9th–16th quarterfinals ====
Date	Time		Score		Set 1	Set 2	Set 3	Set 4	Set 5	Total	Report
23 Oct	12:00	Saudi Arabia	3–0	Turkmenistan	25–17	25–23	25–20			75–60	Report
23 Oct	14:00	India	3–0	Uzbekistan	27–25	25–20	25–10			77–55	Report
23 Oct	16:00	Kazakhstan	3–2	New Zealand	25–17	25–22	22–25	23–25	15–12	110–101	Report
23 Oct	18:30	Sri Lanka	3–0	Maldives	25–16	25–12	25–22			75–50	Report

==== 13th–16th semifinals ====
Date	Time		Score		Set 1	Set 2	Set 3	Set 4	Set 5	Total	Report
24 Oct	12:00	Turkmenistan	3–1	Uzbekistan	25–22	26–24	21–25	25–14		97–85	Report
24 Oct	14:00	New Zealand	3–0	Maldives	25–17	25–14	25–12			75–43	Report

==== 9th–12th semifinals ====
Date	Time		Score		Set 1	Set 2	Set 3	Set 4	Set 5	Total	Report
24 Oct	16:00	Saudi Arabia	1–3	India	22–25	25–20	23–25	18–25		88–95	Report
24 Oct	18:30	Kazakhstan	3–1	Sri Lanka	25–20	17–25	25–22	27–25		94–92	Report

==== 15th place match ====
Date	Time		Score		Set 1	Set 2	Set 3	Set 4	Set 5	Total	Report
25 Oct	Forfeit	Uzbekistan	0–3	Maldives	0–25	0–25	0–25			0–75	Report

==== 13th place match ====
Date	Time		Score		Set 1	Set 2	Set 3	Set 4	Set 5	Total	Report
25 Oct	09:30	Turkmenistan	3–2	New Zealand	25–22	19–25	26–24	19–25	15–12	104–108	Report

==== 11th place match ====
Date	Time		Score		Set 1	Set 2	Set 3	Set 4	Set 5	Total	Report
25 Oct	11:30	Saudi Arabia	1–3	Sri Lanka	17–25	18–25	27–25	21–25		83–100	Report

==== 9th place match ====
Date	Time		Score		Set 1	Set 2	Set 3	Set 4	Set 5	Total	Report
25 Oct	13:30	India	3–1	Kazakhstan	25–20	34–36	25–22	25–10		109–88	Report

=== Final eight ===
Quarterfinals
23 October
Bahrain	3
Chinese Taipei	1
23 October
Iran	3
Thailand	0
23 October
Japan	0
South Korea	3
23 October
China	3
Qatar	1

Semifinals
24 October
Bahrain	1
Iran	3
24 October
South Korea	1
China	3

Final
25 October
Iran	3
China	0
3rd place match
25 October
Bahrain	0
South Korea	3

5th–8th semifinals
24 October
Chinese Taipei	3
Thailand	1
24 October
Japan	3
Qatar	1

5th place match
25 October
Chinese Taipei	0
Japan	3
7th place match
25 October
Thailand	1
Qatar	3

==== Quarterfinals ====
Date	Time		Score		Set 1	Set 2	Set 3	Set 4	Set 5	Total	Report
23 Oct	12:00	Iran	3–0	Thailand	25–21	25–7	25–19			75–47	Report
23 Oct	14:00	Japan	0–3	South Korea	25–27	23–25	19–25			67–77	Report
23 Oct	16:00	China	3–1	Qatar	25–17	25–19	21–25	25–23		96–84	Report
23 Oct	18:30	Bahrain	3–1	Chinese Taipei	25–27	25–19	25–17	25–21		100–84	Report

==== 5th–8th semifinals ====
Date	Time		Score		Set 1	Set 2	Set 3	Set 4	Set 5	Total	Report
24 Oct	12:00	Chinese Taipei	3–1	Thailand	28–26	25–16	20–25	25–18		98–85	Report
24 Oct	14:00	Japan	3–1	Qatar	19–25	25–21	25–22	25–18		94–86	Report

==== Semifinals ====
Date	Time		Score		Set 1	Set 2	Set 3	Set 4	Set 5	Total	Report
24 Oct	16:00	South Korea	1–3	China	25–23	22–25	17–25	24–26		88–99	Report
24 Oct	18:30	Bahrain	1–3	Iran	14–25	25–21	24–26	15–25		78–97	Report

==== 7th place match ====
Date	Time		Score		Set 1	Set 2	Set 3	Set 4	Set 5	Total	Report
25 Oct	09:30	Thailand	1–3	Qatar	25–20	16–25	14–25	19–25		74–95	Report

==== 5th place match ====
Date	Time		Score		Set 1	Set 2	Set 3	Set 4	Set 5	Total	Report
25 Oct	11:30	Chinese Taipei	0–3	Japan	23–25	18–25	18–25			59–75	Report

==== 3rd place match ====
Date	Time		Score		Set 1	Set 2	Set 3	Set 4	Set 5	Total	Report
25 Oct	16:00	Bahrain	0–3	South Korea	20–25	14–25	22–25			56–75	Report

==== Final ====
Date	Time		Score		Set 1	Set 2	Set 3	Set 4	Set 5	Total	Report
25 Oct	18:30	Iran	3–0	China	25–19	25–18	25–19			75–56	Report

== Final standing ==
Rank	Team
1st place, gold medalist(s)	Iran
2nd place, silver medalist(s)	China
3rd place, bronze medalist(s)	South Korea
4	Bahrain
5	Japan
6	Chinese Taipei
7	Qatar
8	Thailand
9	India
10	Kazakhstan
11	Sri Lanka
12	Saudi Arabia
13	Turkmenistan
14	New Zealand
15	Maldives
16	Uzbekistan
17	Hong Kong
18	Kuwait

Qualified for the 2015 U21 World Championship

2014 Asian Men's U20 champions

Iran
5th title

12–man roster
Hamoodi, Cheperli, Taghizadeh, Seyedniazi, Allahverdian, Valaei, Evazpour, Aghchelli, Manavinejad (c), Daliri, Karimi, Heidari
Head coach
Nafarzadeh

== Awards ==
- Most valuable player
  (Iran) Mohammad Javad Manavinejad
- Best setter
  (China) Yu Yaochen
- Best outside spikers
  (Iran) Akbar Valaei
  (China) Xia Runtao
- Best middle blockers
  (Iran) Sahand Allah Verdian
  (China) Zhang Zhejia
- Best opposite spiker
  (Bahrain) Mohamed Anan
- Best libero
  (South Korea) Lee Sang-uk
