= 2010 Asian Junior Men's Volleyball Championship =

2010 Asian Junior Men's Championship

Tournament details
- Host country: Thailand
- Dates: 1–9 October
- Teams: 16
- Venues: 2 (in 2 host cities)

Final positions
- Champions: Japan (2nd title)

Tournament awards
- MVP: (Japan) Taiki Tsuruda

The 2010 Asian Junior Men's Volleyball Championship was held in Nakhon Pathom and Ratchaburi, Thailand.

== Pools composition ==
The teams are seeded based on their final ranking at the 2008 Asian Junior Men's Volleyball Championship.

Pool A	Pool B	Pool C	Pool D
Thailand (Host); Qatar (8th); Maldives; New Zealand; ~~Hong Kong~~ *	Iran (1st); Japan (7th); Sri Lanka; Indonesia	China (2nd); South Korea (6th); Kazakhstan; Vietnam	India (4th); Australia (5th); Iraq; Chinese Taipei

* Withdrew

== Preliminary round ==
=== Pool A ===
Pos	Team	Pld	W	L	Pts	SW	SL	SR	SPW	SPL	SPR	Qualification
1	Thailand	3	3	0	6	9	0	MAX	225	158	1.424	Pool E
2	Qatar	3	2	1	5	6	3	2.000	204	182	1.121	Pool E
3	New Zealand	3	1	2	4	3	8	0.375	228	239	0.954	Pool G
4	Maldives	3	0	3	3	2	9	0.222	184	262	0.702	Pool G

Date	Time		Score		Set 1	Set 2	Set 3	Set 4	Set 5	Total	Report
01 Oct	14:00	Thailand	3–0	New Zealand	25–18	25–17	25–16			75–51	Report
01 Oct	16:00	Maldives	0–3	Qatar	16–25	10–25	16–25			42–75	Report
02 Oct	14:00	Qatar	3–0	New Zealand	25–20	25–23	25–22			75–65	Report
02 Oct	16:00	Maldives	0–3	Thailand	14–25	22–25	17–25			53–75	Report
03 Oct	14:00	New Zealand	3–2	Maldives	25–17	23–25	25–12	24–26	15–9	112–89	Report
03 Oct	16:00	Thailand	3–0	Qatar	25–16	25–17	25–21			75–54	Report

=== Pool B ===
Pos	Team	Pld	W	L	Pts	SW	SL	SR	SPW	SPL	SPR	Qualification
1	Iran	3	3	0	6	9	1	9.000	247	178	1.388	Pool F
2	Japan	3	2	1	5	7	4	1.750	265	248	1.069	Pool F
3	Sri Lanka	3	1	2	4	3	7	0.429	210	245	0.857	Pool H
4	Indonesia	3	0	3	3	2	9	0.222	229	280	0.818	Pool H

Date	Time		Score		Set 1	Set 2	Set 3	Set 4	Set 5	Total	Report
01 Oct	10:00	Iran	3–0	Sri Lanka	25–11	25–16	25–21			75–48	Report
01 Oct	12:00	Japan	3–1	Indonesia	25–17	32–34	25–18	25–18		107–87	Report
02 Oct	18:00	Sri Lanka	3–1	Indonesia	25–23	21–25	25–22	27–25		98–95	Report
02 Oct	20:00	Iran	3–1	Japan	25–18	25–21	22–25	25–19		97–83	Report
03 Oct	14:00	Indonesia	0–3	Iran	17–25	17–25	13–25			47–75	Report
03 Oct	16:00	Japan	3–0	Sri Lanka	25–19	25–23	25–22			75–64	Report

=== Pool C ===
Pos	Team	Pld	W	L	Pts	SW	SL	SR	SPW	SPL	SPR	Qualification
1	China	3	3	0	6	9	3	3.000	279	227	1.229	Pool E
2	South Korea	3	2	1	5	7	5	1.400	271	253	1.071	Pool E
3	Kazakhstan	3	1	2	4	7	6	1.167	282	253	1.115	Pool G
4	Vietnam	3	0	3	3	0	9	0.000	126	225	0.560	Pool G

Date	Time		Score		Set 1	Set 2	Set 3	Set 4	Set 5	Total	Report
01 Oct	14:00	South Korea	3–0	Vietnam	25–12	25–21	25–13			75–46	Report
01 Oct	16:00	China	3–2	Kazakhstan	25–19	25–20	23–25	18–25	15–9	106–98	Report
02 Oct	10:00	Vietnam	0–3	Kazakhstan	16–25	10–25	14–25			40–75	Report
02 Oct	12:00	South Korea	1–3	China	19–25	25–23	23–25	22–25		89–98	Report
03 Oct	18:00	China	3–0	Vietnam	25–16	25–7	25–17			75–40	Report
03 Oct	20:00	Kazakhstan	2–3	South Korea	21–25	25–22	23–25	25–18	15–17	109–107	Report

=== Pool D ===
Pos	Team	Pld	W	L	Pts	SW	SL	SR	SPW	SPL	SPR	Qualification
1	India	3	3	0	6	9	1	9.000	248	183	1.355	Pool F
2	Chinese Taipei	3	2	1	5	6	4	1.500	243	225	1.080	Pool F
3	Iraq	3	1	2	4	3	7	0.429	196	237	0.827	Pool H
4	Australia	3	0	3	3	3	9	0.333	251	293	0.857	Pool H

Date	Time		Score		Set 1	Set 2	Set 3	Set 4	Set 5	Total	Report
01 Oct	18:00	Iraq	3–1	Australia	25–23	25–17	20–25	25–22		95–87	Report
01 Oct	20:00	India	3–0	Chinese Taipei	25–21	25–20	27–25			77–66	Report
02 Oct	14:00	Iraq	0–3	India	16–25	18–25	10–25			44–75	Report
02 Oct	16:00	Australia	1–3	Chinese Taipei	29–27	17–25	22–25	23–25		91–102	Report
03 Oct	10:00	Chinese Taipei	3–0	Iraq	25–18	25–18	25–21			75–57	Report
03 Oct	12:00	India	3–1	Australia	25–18	21–25	25–13	25–17		96–73	Report

== Classification round ==
- The results and the points of the matches between the same teams that were already played during the preliminary round shall be taken into account for the classification round.

=== Pool E ===
Pos	Team	Pld	W	L	Pts	SW	SL	SR	SPW	SPL	SPR	Qualification
1	China	3	3	0	6	9	1	9.000	248	185	1.341	Quarterfinals
2	South Korea	3	2	1	5	7	4	1.750	261	223	1.170	Quarterfinals
3	Thailand	3	1	2	4	3	6	0.500	171	204	0.838	Quarterfinals
4	Qatar	3	0	3	3	1	9	0.111	179	247	0.725	Quarterfinals

Date	Time		Score		Set 1	Set 2	Set 3	Set 4	Set 5	Total	Report
05 Oct	14:00	Thailand	0–3	South Korea	15–25	20–25	19–25			54–75	Report
05 Oct	16:00	China	3–0	Qatar	25–19	25–17	25–18			75–54	Report
06 Oct	14:00	Qatar	1–3	South Korea	17–25	17–25	25–22	12–25		71–97	Report
06 Oct	16:00	Thailand	0–3	China	14–25	11–25	17–25			42–75	Report

=== Pool F ===
Pos	Team	Pld	W	L	Pts	SW	SL	SR	SPW	SPL	SPR	Qualification
1	Iran	3	3	0	6	9	1	9.000	247	202	1.223	Quarterfinals
2	Japan	3	2	1	5	7	5	1.400	274	262	1.046	Quarterfinals
3	India	3	1	2	4	5	6	0.833	246	257	0.957	Quarterfinals
4	Chinese Taipei	3	0	3	3	0	9	0.000	181	227	0.797	Quarterfinals

Date	Time		Score		Set 1	Set 2	Set 3	Set 4	Set 5	Total	Report
05 Oct	18:00	Iran	3–0	Chinese Taipei	25–18	25–18	25–19			75–55	Report
05 Oct	20:00	India	2–3	Japan	32–30	17–25	25–21	21–25	10–15	105–116	Report
06 Oct	18:00	Japan	3–0	Chinese Taipei	25–20	25–18	25–22			75–60	Report
06 Oct	20:00	Iran	3–0	India	25–22	25–23	25–19			75–64	Report

=== Pool G ===
Pos	Team	Pld	W	L	Pts	SW	SL	SR	SPW	SPL	SPR	Qualification
1	Kazakhstan	3	3	0	6	9	0	MAX	225	125	1.800	9th–12th place
2	Vietnam	3	2	1	5	6	5	1.200	229	232	0.987	9th–12th place
3	New Zealand	3	1	2	4	4	8	0.500	241	255	0.945	13th–16th place
4	Maldives	3	0	3	3	3	9	0.333	202	285	0.709	13th–16th place

Date	Time		Score		Set 1	Set 2	Set 3	Set 4	Set 5	Total	Report
05 Oct	14:00	New Zealand	1–3	Vietnam	11–25	20–25	25–16	23–25		79–91	Report
05 Oct	16:00	Kazakhstan	3–0	Maldives	25–9	25–12	25–14			75–35	Report
06 Oct	14:00	Maldives	1–3	Vietnam	18–25	17–25	25–23	18–25		78–98	Report
06 Oct	16:00	New Zealand	0–3	Kazakhstan	17–25	14–25	19–25			50–75	Report

=== Pool H ===
Pos	Team	Pld	W	L	Pts	SW	SL	SR	SPW	SPL	SPR	Qualification
1	Sri Lanka	3	3	0	6	9	2	4.500	274	233	1.176	9th–12th place
2	Indonesia	3	2	1	5	7	5	1.400	289	276	1.047	9th–12th place
3	Iraq	3	1	2	4	4	7	0.571	230	259	0.888	13th–16th place
4	Australia	3	0	3	3	3	9	0.333	268	293	0.915	13th–16th place

Date	Time		Score		Set 1	Set 2	Set 3	Set 4	Set 5	Total	Report
05 Oct	10:00	Sri Lanka	3–1	Australia	24–26	25–21	27–25	25–17		101–89	Report
05 Oct	12:00	Iraq	1–3	Indonesia	21–25	25–22	21–25	19–25		86–97	Report
06 Oct	10:00	Indonesia	3–1	Australia	20–25	25–21	27–25	25–21		97–92	Report
06 Oct	12:00	Sri Lanka	3–0	Iraq	25–17	25–15	25–17			75–49	Report

== Classification 13th–16th ==
=== 15th place ===
Date	Time		Score		Set 1	Set 2	Set 3	Set 4	Set 5	Total	Report
08 Oct	10:00	Maldives	0–3	Australia	7–25	11–25	11–25			29–75	Report

=== 13th place ===
Date	Time		Score		Set 1	Set 2	Set 3	Set 4	Set 5	Total	Report
08 Oct	12:00	New Zealand	2–3	Iraq	25–23	25–12	21–25	23–25	13–15	107–100	Report

== Classification 9th–12th ==
9th–12th places
8 October – Ratchaburi
Kazakhstan	2
Indonesia	3
8 October – Ratchaburi
Sri Lanka	3
Vietnam	0

9th place
9 October – Ratchaburi
Indonesia	3
Sri Lanka	2
11th place
9 October – Ratchaburi
Kazakhstan	3
Vietnam	0

=== Semifinals ===
Date	Time		Score		Set 1	Set 2	Set 3	Set 4	Set 5	Total	Report
08 Oct	14:00	Kazakhstan	2–3	Indonesia	25–22	27–25	19–25	19–25	8–15	98–112	Report
08 Oct	16:00	Sri Lanka	3–0	Vietnam	25–19	25–22	25–18			75–59	Report

=== 11th place ===
Date	Time		Score		Set 1	Set 2	Set 3	Set 4	Set 5	Total	Report
09 Oct	10:00	Kazakhstan	3–0	Vietnam	25–11	25–15	25–16			75–42	Report

=== 9th place ===
Date	Time		Score		Set 1	Set 2	Set 3	Set 4	Set 5	Total	Report
09 Oct	12:00	Indonesia	3–2	Sri Lanka	25–18	22–25	25–27	25–22	15–6	112–98	Report

== Final round ==
Quarterfinals
7 October – Nakhon Pathom
China	3
Chinese Taipei	0
7 October – Nakhon Pathom
Japan	3
Thailand	0
7 October – Nakhon Pathom
Iran	3
Qatar	0
7 October – Nakhon Pathom
South Korea	2
India	3

Semifinals
8 October – Nakhon Pathom
China	2
Japan	3
8 October – Nakhon Pathom
Iran	3
India	0

Final
9 October – Nakhon Pathom
Japan	3
Iran	1
3rd place
9 October – Nakhon Pathom
China	2
India	3

5th–8th places
8 October – Nakhon Pathom
Chinese Taipei	3
Thailand	0
8 October – Nakhon Pathom
Qatar	0
South Korea	3

5th place
9 October – Nakhon Pathom
Chinese Taipei	2
South Korea	3
7th place
9 October – Nakhon Pathom
Thailand	3
Qatar	2

=== Quarterfinals ===
Date	Time		Score		Set 1	Set 2	Set 3	Set 4	Set 5	Total	Report
07 Oct	12:00	China	3–0	Chinese Taipei	25–19	27–25	25–23			77–67	Report
07 Oct	15:00	Japan	3–0	Thailand	25–20	25–12	25–15			75–47	Report
07 Oct	17:00	South Korea	2–3	India	25–17	21–25	25–23	22–25	13–15	106–105	Report
07 Oct	19:00	Iran	3–0	Qatar	25–9	25–13	25–18			75–40	Report

=== 5th–8th semifinals ===
Date	Time		Score		Set 1	Set 2	Set 3	Set 4	Set 5	Total	Report
08 Oct	14:00	Chinese Taipei	3–0	Thailand	25–15	25–17	25–21			75–53	Report
08 Oct	16:00	Qatar	0–3	South Korea	19–25	17–25	18–25			54–75	Report

=== Semifinals ===
Date	Time		Score		Set 1	Set 2	Set 3	Set 4	Set 5	Total	Report
08 Oct	18:00	China	2–3	Japan	23–25	22–25	25–23	25–17	12–15	107–105	Report
08 Oct	20:00	Iran	3–0	India	25–23	25–17	25–18			75–58	Report

=== 7th place ===
Date	Time		Score		Set 1	Set 2	Set 3	Set 4	Set 5	Total	Report
09 Oct	10:00	Thailand	3–2	Qatar	25–13	16–25	25–19	26–28	15–13	107–98	Report

=== 5th place ===
Date	Time		Score		Set 1	Set 2	Set 3	Set 4	Set 5	Total	Report
09 Oct	12:00	Chinese Taipei	2–3	South Korea	23–25	25–23	27–25	21–25	13–15	109–113	Report

=== 3rd place ===
Date	Time		Score		Set 1	Set 2	Set 3	Set 4	Set 5	Total	Report
09 Oct	14:00	China	2–3	India	25–21	25–17	25–27	22–25	10–15	107–105	Report

=== Final ===
Date	Time		Score		Set 1	Set 2	Set 3	Set 4	Set 5	Total	Report
09 Oct	16:00	Japan	3–1	Iran	25–19	19–25	25–12	25–23		94–79	Report

== Final standing ==
Rank	Team
1st place, gold medalist(s)	Japan
2nd place, silver medalist(s)	Iran
3rd place, bronze medalist(s)	India
4	China
5	South Korea
6	Chinese Taipei
7	Thailand
8	Qatar
9	Indonesia
10	Sri Lanka
11	Kazakhstan
12	Vietnam
13	Iraq
14	New Zealand
15	Australia
16	Maldives

Qualified for the 2011 World Junior Championship

2010 Asian Junior Men's champions

Japan
Second title

Team Roster
Yosuke Arai, Ryota Denda, Taiki Tsuruda, Takumi Okada, Takashi Dekita, Issei Maeda, Yamato Fushimi, Daiki Hisahara, Satoshi Ide, Sho Kuboyama, Yuki Tainaka, Kodai Yoshioko

Head Coach: Noriaki Sako

== Awards ==
- MVP: (Japan) Taiki Tsuruda
- Best scorer: (China) Dai Qingyao
- Best spiker: (China) Song Jianwei
- Best blocker: (India) G. R. Vaishnav
- Best server: (China) Song Jianwei
- Best setter: (China) Xu Xiantao
- Best libero: (Japan) Satoshi Ide
