= Song Jianwei =

Chinese volleyball player (born 1992)

Personal information
- Nationality: Chinese
- Born: 4 January 1992 (age 34)
- Height: 194 cm (6 ft 4 in)
- Weight: 75 kg (165 lb)
- Spike: 340 cm (134 in)
- Block: 330 cm (130 in)

Career
Years	Teams
2009 - present	Shandong

National team
2011 - 2016	China

Song Jianwei (born 4 January 1992) is a Chinese volleyball player. He is part of the China men's national volleyball team. On club level he plays for Shandong.
