= 2000 Asian Junior Men's Volleyball Championship =

2000 Asian Junior Men's Championship

Tournament details
- Host country: Iran
- Dates: 18–25 August
- Teams: 13
- Venue: 1 (in 1 host city)

Final positions
- Champions: China (3rd title)

The 2000 Asian Junior Men's Volleyball Championship was held in Azadi Volleyball Hall, Tehran, Iran from 18 August to 25 August 2000.

== Pools composition ==
The teams are seeded based on their final ranking at the 1998 Asian Junior Men's Volleyball Championship.

Pool A	Pool B	Pool C	Pool D
Iran (Host & 1st); Pakistan (8th); North Korea	South Korea (2nd); Australia (7th); Kazakhstan	Chinese Taipei (3rd); Japan (6th); Bahrain	China (4th); India (5th); Saudi Arabia; Sri Lanka

== Preliminary round ==
=== Pool A ===
Pos	Team	Pld	W	L	Pts	SW	SL	SR	SPW	SPL	SPR	Qualification
1	Iran	2	2	0	4	6	2	3.000	197	180	1.094	Quarterfinals
2	Pakistan	2	1	1	3	4	5	0.800	200	195	1.026	Quarterfinals
3	North Korea	2	0	2	2	3	6	0.500	192	214	0.897	

Date		Score		Set 1	Set 2	Set 3	Set 4	Set 5	Total
18 Aug	North Korea	2–3	Pakistan	25–20	25–20	18–25	16–25	18–20	102–110
19 Aug	Iran	3–1	North Korea	25–17	26–24	28–30	25–19		104–90
20 Aug	Pakistan	1–3	Iran	25–18	23–25	22–25	20–25		90–93

=== Pool B ===
Pos	Team	Pld	W	L	Pts	SW	SL	SR	SPW	SPL	SPR	Qualification
1	South Korea	2	2	0	4	6	1	6.000	176	142	1.239	Quarterfinals
2	Australia	2	1	1	3	4	5	0.800	217	224	0.969	Quarterfinals
3	Kazakhstan	2	0	2	2	2	6	0.333	173	200	0.865	

Date		Score		Set 1	Set 2	Set 3	Set 4	Set 5	Total
18 Aug	Australia	3–2	Kazakhstan	20–25	30–28	30–28	30–32	15–10	125–123
19 Aug	South Korea	3–1	Australia	25–23	22–25	25–17	29–27		101–92
20 Aug	Kazakhstan	0–3	South Korea	18–25	13–25	19–25			50–75

=== Pool C ===
Pos	Team	Pld	W	L	Pts	SW	SL	SR	SPW	SPL	SPR	Qualification
1	Japan	2	2	0	4	6	1	6.000	173	148	1.169	Quarterfinals
2	Bahrain	2	1	1	3	4	5	0.800	191	199	0.960	Quarterfinals
3	Chinese Taipei	2	0	2	2	2	6	0.333	166	183	0.907	

Date		Score		Set 1	Set 2	Set 3	Set 4	Set 5	Total
18 Aug	Bahrain	1–3	Japan	25–22	17–25	19–25	23–25		84–97
19 Aug	Chinese Taipei	2–3	Bahrain	22–25	25–21	25–21	20–25	10–15	102–107
20 Aug	Japan	3–0	Chinese Taipei	26–24	25–20	25–20			76–64

=== Pool D ===
Pos	Team	Pld	W	L	Pts	SW	SL	SR	SPW	SPL	SPR	Qualification
1	China	3	3	0	6	9	1	9.000	248	183	1.355	Quarterfinals
2	Saudi Arabia	3	2	1	5	7	3	2.333	234	203	1.153	Quarterfinals
3	India	3	1	2	4	3	6	0.500	183	202	0.906	
4	Sri Lanka	3	0	3	3	0	9	0.000	148	225	0.658	

Date		Score		Set 1	Set 2	Set 3	Set 4	Set 5	Total
18 Aug	India	0–3	Saudi Arabia	18–25	20–25	16–25			54–75
18 Aug	Sri Lanka	0–3	China	18–25	13–25	14–25			45–75
19 Aug	India	3–0	Sri Lanka	25–21	25–16	25–15			75–52
19 Aug	Saudi Arabia	1–3	China	20–25	25–23	22–25	17–25		84–98
20 Aug	Sri Lanka	0–3	Saudi Arabia	20–25	13–25	18–25			51–75
20 Aug	China	3–0	India	25–19	25–20	25–15			75–54

== Quarterfinals ==
- The results and the points of the matches between the same teams that were already played during the preliminary round shall be taken into account for the Quarterfinals.

=== Pool E ===
Pos	Team	Pld	W	L	Pts	SW	SL	SR	SPW	SPL	SPR	Qualification
1	Japan	3	3	0	6	9	4	2.250	297	268	1.108	Championship round
2	Iran	3	2	1	5	8	4	2.000	266	265	1.004	Championship round
3	Pakistan	3	1	2	4	5	7	0.714	275	278	0.989	5th–8th classification
4	Bahrain	3	0	3	3	2	9	0.222	244	271	0.900	5th–8th classification

Date		Score		Set 1	Set 2	Set 3	Set 4	Set 5	Total
21 Aug	Pakistan	1–3	Japan	25–19	22–25	22–25	22–25		91–94
21 Aug	Iran	3–0	Bahrain	25–23	25–18	30–28			80–69
22 Aug	Pakistan	3–1	Bahrain	25–23	25–20	19–25	25–23		94–91
22 Aug	Iran	2–3	Japan	17–25	16–25	25–20	25–21	10–15	93–106

=== Pool F ===
Pos	Team	Pld	W	L	Pts	SW	SL	SR	SPW	SPL	SPR	Qualification
1	China	3	3	0	6	9	1	9.000	248	188	1.319	Championship round
2	Saudi Arabia	3	2	1	5	7	5	1.400	264	265	0.996	Championship round
3	South Korea	3	1	2	4	5	7	0.714	260	271	0.959	5th–8th classification
4	Australia	3	0	3	3	1	9	0.111	204	252	0.810	5th–8th classification

Date		Score		Set 1	Set 2	Set 3	Set 4	Set 5	Total
21 Aug	South Korea	2–3	Saudi Arabia	25–20	21–25	25–19	21–25	9–15	101–104
21 Aug	Australia	0–3	China	13–25	19–25	14–25			46–75
22 Aug	South Korea	0–3	China	19–25	20–25	19–25			58–75
22 Aug	Australia	0–3	Saudi Arabia	24–26	20–25	22–25			66–76

=== Pool G ===
Pos	Team	Pld	W	L	Pts	SW	SL	SR	SPW	SPL	SPR	Qualification
1	North Korea	1	1	0	2	3	1	3.000	95	87	1.092	9th–12th classification
2	Chinese Taipei	1	0	1	1	1	3	0.333	87	95	0.916	9th–12th classification

Date		Score		Set 1	Set 2	Set 3	Set 4	Set 5	Total
22 Aug	North Korea	3–1	Chinese Taipei	25–19	20–25	25–22	25–21		95–87

=== Pool H ===
Pos	Team	Pld	W	L	Pts	SW	SL	SR	SPW	SPL	SPR	Qualification
1	India	2	2	0	4	6	1	6.000	168	143	1.175	9th–12th classification
2	Kazakhstan	2	1	1	3	4	4	1.000	190	168	1.131	9th–12th classification
3	Sri Lanka	2	0	2	2	1	6	0.167	127	174	0.730	

Date		Score		Set 1	Set 2	Set 3	Set 4	Set 5	Total
21 Aug	Kazakhstan	3–1	Sri Lanka	25–21	25–15	24–26	25–13		99–75
22 Aug	Kazakhstan	1–3	India	23–25	22–25	25–18	21–25		91–93

== Final round ==
- The results and the points of the matches between the same teams that were already played during the previous rounds shall be taken into account for the final round.

=== Classification 9th–12th ===
Pos	Team	Pld	W	L	Pts	SW	SL	SR	SPW	SPL	SPR
9	India	3	3	0	6	9	4	2.250	299	295	1.014
10	North Korea	3	2	1	5	7	4	1.750	272	194	1.402
11	Chinese Taipei	3	1	2	4	6	6	1.000	264	194	1.361
12	Kazakhstan	3	0	3	1	1	9	0.111	91	243	0.374

Date		Score		Set 1	Set 2	Set 3	Set 4	Set 5	Total
24 Aug	North Korea	3–0	Kazakhstan	25–0	25–0	25–0			Forfeit
24 Aug	India	3–2	Chinese Taipei	25–23	25–20	13–25	21–25	15–9	99–102
25 Aug	Chinese Taipei	3–0	Kazakhstan	25–0	25–0	25–0			Forfeit
25 Aug	North Korea	1–3	India	30–32	23–25	27–25	22–25		102–107

=== Classification 5th–8th ===
Pos	Team	Pld	W	L	Pts	SW	SL	SR	SPW	SPL	SPR
5	South Korea	3	3	0	6	9	2	4.500	281	236	1.191
6	Pakistan	3	2	1	5	7	4	1.750	264	249	1.060
7	Australia	3	1	2	4	4	8	0.500	280	308	0.909
8	Bahrain	3	0	3	3	3	9	0.333	272	304	0.895

Date		Score		Set 1	Set 2	Set 3	Set 4	Set 5	Total
24 Aug	Pakistan	3–0	Australia	25–15	25–17	25–21			75–53
24 Aug	South Korea	3–0	Bahrain	25–16	25–16	25–17			75–49
25 Aug	Bahrain	2–3	Australia	47–49	25–22	23–25	26–24	11–15	132–135
25 Aug	Pakistan	1–3	South Korea	23–25	32–30	19–25	21–25		95–105

=== Championship ===
Pos	Team	Pld	W	L	Pts	SW	SL	SR	SPW	SPL	SPR
1	China	3	3	0	6	9	3	3.000	290	245	1.184
2	Saudi Arabia	3	1	2	4	6	6	1.000	272	267	1.019
3	Iran	3	1	2	4	6	8	0.750	287	317	0.905
4	Japan	3	1	2	4	4	8	0.500	242	262	0.924

Date		Score		Set 1	Set 2	Set 3	Set 4	Set 5	Total
24 Aug	China	3–1	Iran	25–19	23–25	25–19	25–19		98–82
24 Aug	Japan	0–3	Saudi Arabia	19–25	22–25	16–25			57–75
25 Aug	Japan	1–3	China	19–25	16–25	25–19	19–25		79–94
25 Aug	Iran	3–2	Saudi Arabia	26–24	20–25	29–27	22–25	15–12	112–113

== Final standing ==
Rank	Team
1st place, gold medalist(s)	China
2nd place, silver medalist(s)	Saudi Arabia
3rd place, bronze medalist(s)	Iran
4	Japan
5	South Korea
6	Pakistan
7	Australia
8	Bahrain
9	India
10	North Korea
11	Chinese Taipei
12	Kazakhstan
13	Sri Lanka

Qualified for the 2001 World Junior Championship

2000 Asian Junior Men's champions

China
Third title
