= Jumah Faraj =

Qatari male volleyball player

Personal information
- Nationality: Qatari
- Born: 14 April 1985 (age 41)
- Height: 199 cm (6 ft 6 in)
- Weight: 70 kg (154 lb)
- Spike: 335 cm (132 in)
- Block: 325 cm (128 in)

Volleyball information
- Position: outside hitter
- Number: 2

Career
Years	Teams
2010-2012	Al-Arabi

National team
2010	Qatar

Jumah Faraj Mohamed (Arabic: ﺟﻤﻌﺔ ﻓﺮج, born 14 April 1985) is a Qatari male volleyball player. He was part of the Qatar men's national volleyball team and competed at the 2010 Asian Games. With his club Al-Arabi he competed at the 2012 FIVB Volleyball Men's Club World Championship.
