= 2002 Asian Junior Men's Volleyball Championship =

2002 Asian Junior Men's Championship
Tournament details
- Host country: Iran
- Dates: 10–17 September
- Teams: 14
- Venue: 1 (in 1 host city)

Final positions
- Champions: Iran (2nd title)

Tournament awards
- MVP: (Iran) Rouhollah Kolivand

The 2002 Asian Junior Men's Volleyball Championship took place at the Azadi Volleyball Hall, Tehran, Iran from 10 September to 17 September 2002.

== Pools composition ==
The teams were seeded according to their final rankings at the 2000 Asian Junior Men's Volleyball Championship.

Pool A	Pool B	Pool C	Pool D
Iran (Host & 3rd); India (9th); Yemen	China (1st); Bahrain (8th); United Arab Emirates	Japan (4th); Australia (7th); Qatar; Chinese Taipei	South Korea (5th); Pakistan (6th); Kuwait; Thailand

== Preliminary round ==
=== Pool A ===
Pos	Team	Pld	W	L	Pts	SW	SL	SR	SPW	SPL	SPR	Qualification
1	Iran	2	2	0	4	6	0	MAX	150	86	1.744	Pool E or Pool F
2	India	2	1	1	3	3	3	1.000	121	105	1.152	Pool E or Pool F
3	Yemen	2	0	2	2	0	6	0.000	70	150	0.467	Pool G

Date		Score		Set 1	Set 2	Set 3	Set 4	Set 5	Total
10 Sep	Iran	3–0	India	25–10	25–18	25–18			75–46
11 Sep	Yemen	0–3	Iran	10–25	16–25	14–25			40–75
12 Sep	India	3–0	Yemen	25–11	25–9	25–10			75–30

=== Pool B ===
Pos	Team	Pld	W	L	Pts	SW	SL	SR	SPW	SPL	SPR	Qualification
1	China	2	2	0	4	6	0	MAX	150	108	1.389	Pool E or Pool F
2	Bahrain	2	1	1	3	3	4	0.750	164	165	0.994	Pool E or Pool F
3	United Arab Emirates	2	0	2	2	1	6	0.167	135	176	0.767	Pool H

Date		Score		Set 1	Set 2	Set 3	Set 4	Set 5	Total
10 Sep	China	3–0	Bahrain	25–20	25–22	25–21			75–63
11 Sep	United Arab Emirates	0–3	China	18–25	14–25	13–25			45–75
12 Sep	Bahrain	3–1	United Arab Emirates	26–28	25–21	25–18	25–23		101–90

=== Pool C ===
Pos	Team	Pld	W	L	Pts	SW	SL	SR	SPW	SPL	SPR	Qualification
1	Qatar	3	3	0	6	9	2	4.500	264	220	1.200	Pool E or Pool F
2	Chinese Taipei	3	2	1	5	6	5	1.200	252	236	1.068	Pool E or Pool F
3	Japan	3	1	2	4	5	6	0.833	242	250	0.968	Pool G or Pool H
4	Australia	3	0	3	3	2	9	0.222	220	272	0.809	Pool G or Pool H

Date		Score		Set 1	Set 2	Set 3	Set 4	Set 5	Total
10 Sep	Chinese Taipei	0–3	Qatar	16–25	16–25	23–25			55–75
10 Sep	Japan	3–0	Australia	26–24	25–18	25–18			76–60
11 Sep	Japan	1–3	Chinese Taipei	18–25	25–20	21–25	18–25		82–95
11 Sep	Australia	1–3	Qatar	25–19	19–25	16–25	21–25		81–94
12 Sep	Qatar	3–1	Japan	20–25	25–18	25–20	25–21		95–84
12 Sep	Chinese Taipei	3–1	Australia	29–27	25–9	23–25	25–18		102–79

=== Pool D ===
Pos	Team	Pld	W	L	Pts	SW	SL	SR	SPW	SPL	SPR	Qualification
1	South Korea	3	3	0	6	9	1	9.000	249	182	1.368	Pool E or Pool F
2	Pakistan	3	2	1	5	6	4	1.500	239	221	1.081	Pool E or Pool F
3	Thailand	3	1	2	4	5	6	0.833	243	244	0.996	Pool G or Pool H
4	Kuwait	3	0	3	3	0	9	0.000	141	225	0.627	Pool G or Pool H

Date		Score		Set 1	Set 2	Set 3	Set 4	Set 5	Total
10 Sep	Kuwait	0–3	Thailand	23–25	12–25	17–25			52–75
10 Sep	South Korea	3–0	Pakistan	25–20	25–20	29–27			79–67
11 Sep	South Korea	3–0	Kuwait	25–13	25–9	25–18			75–40
11 Sep	Pakistan	3–1	Thailand	25–23	27–25	20–25	25–20		97–93
12 Sep	Kuwait	0–3	Pakistan	19–25	16–25	14–25			49–75
12 Sep	Thailand	1–3	South Korea	25–20	14–25	19–25	17–25		75–95

== Quarterfinals ==
- The results and the points of the matches between the same teams that were already played during the preliminary round shall be taken into account for the Quarterfinals.

=== Pool E ===
Pos	Team	Pld	W	L	Pts	SW	SL	SR	SPW	SPL	SPR	Qualification
1	Iran	3	3	0	6	9	1	9.000	247	167	1.479	Semifinals
2	India	3	2	1	5	6	3	2.000	0	0	—	Semifinals
3	Qatar	3	1	2	4	3	6	0.500	0	0	—	5th–8th classification
4	Chinese Taipei	3	0	3	3	1	9	0.111	191	247	0.773	5th–8th classification

Date		Score		Set 1	Set 2	Set 3	Set 4	Set 5	Total
13 Sep	Qatar	0–3	India						
13 Sep	Iran	3–1	Chinese Taipei	22–25	25–12	25–16	25–21		97–74
14 Sep	India	3–0	Chinese Taipei	25–20	25–19	25–23			75–62
14 Sep	Iran	3–0	Qatar	25–13	25–19	25–15			75–47

=== Pool F ===
Pos	Team	Pld	W	L	Pts	SW	SL	SR	SPW	SPL	SPR	Qualification
1	China	3	3	0	6	9	0	MAX	0	0	—	Semifinals
2	South Korea	3	2	1	5	6	3	2.000	0	0	—	Semifinals
3	Bahrain	3	1	2	4	3	6	0.500	0	0	—	5th–8th classification
4	Pakistan	3	0	3	3	0	9	0.000	0	0	—	5th–8th classification

Date		Score		Set 1	Set 2	Set 3	Set 4	Set 5	Total
13 Sep	China	3–0	Pakistan						
13 Sep	South Korea	3–0	Bahrain						
14 Sep	China	3–0	South Korea	25–23	25–22	27–25			77–70
14 Sep	Bahrain	3–0	Pakistan						

=== Pool G ===
Pos	Team	Pld	W	L	Pts	SW	SL	SR	SPW	SPL	SPR	Qualification
1	Japan	2	2	0	4	6	0	MAX	151	116	1.302	9th–12th classification
2	Australia	2	1	1	3	3	3	1.000	135	125	1.080	9th–12th classification
3	Yemen	2	0	2	2	0	6	0.000	105	150	0.700	13th–14th classification

Date		Score		Set 1	Set 2	Set 3	Set 4	Set 5	Total
13 Sep	Yemen	0–3	Australia	15–25	17–25	17–25			49–75
14 Sep	Yemen	0–3	Japan	11–25	23–25	22–25			56–75

=== Pool H ===
Pos	Team	Pld	W	L	Pts	SW	SL	SR	SPW	SPL	SPR	Qualification
1	Thailand	2	2	0	4	6	1	6.000	178	132	1.348	9th–12th classification
2	United Arab Emirates	2	1	1	3	4	3	1.333	0	0	—	9th–12th classification
3	Kuwait	2	0	2	2	0	6	0.000	0	0	—	13th–14th classification

Date		Score		Set 1	Set 2	Set 3	Set 4	Set 5	Total
13 Sep	United Arab Emirates	3–0	Kuwait						
14 Sep	United Arab Emirates	1–3	Thailand	27–25	12–25	15–25	26–28		80–103

== Classification 13th–14th ==
Date		Score		Set 1	Set 2	Set 3	Set 4	Set 5	Total
16 Sep	Yemen	?–3	Kuwait						

== Classification 9th–12th ==
9th–12th places
16 September – Tehran
Japan	3
United Arab Emirates	0
16 September – Tehran
Thailand	0
Australia	3

9th place
17 September – Tehran
Japan	1
Australia	3
11th place
17 September – Tehran
United Arab Emirates	3
Thailand	0

=== Semifinals ===
Date		Score		Set 1	Set 2	Set 3	Set 4	Set 5	Total
16 Sep	Thailand	0–3	Australia	0–25	0–25	0–25			Forfeit
16 Sep	Japan	3–0	United Arab Emirates	25–17	25–12	28–26			78–55

=== 11th place ===
Date		Score		Set 1	Set 2	Set 3	Set 4	Set 5	Total
17 Sep	United Arab Emirates	3–0	Thailand	25–0	25–0	25–0			Forfeit

=== 9th place ===
Date		Score		Set 1	Set 2	Set 3	Set 4	Set 5	Total
17 Sep	Japan	1–3	Australia	22–25	19–25	25–23	23–25		89–98

== Classification 5th–8th ==
5th–8th places
16 September – Tehran
Qatar	0
Pakistan	3
16 September – Tehran
Bahrain	3
Chinese Taipei	?

5th place
17 September – Tehran
Pakistan	3
Bahrain	?
7th place
17 September – Tehran
Qatar	?
Chinese Taipei	3

=== Semifinals ===
Date		Score		Set 1	Set 2	Set 3	Set 4	Set 5	Total
16 Sep	Qatar	0–3	Pakistan	18–25	22–25	23–25			63–75
16 Sep	Bahrain	3–?	Chinese Taipei						

=== 7th place ===
Date		Score		Set 1	Set 2	Set 3	Set 4	Set 5	Total
17 Sep	Qatar	?–3	Chinese Taipei						

=== 7th place ===
Date		Score		Set 1	Set 2	Set 3	Set 4	Set 5	Total
17 Sep	Pakistan	3–?	Bahrain						

== Final round ==
Semifinals
16 September – Tehran
Iran	3
South Korea	2
16 September – Tehran
China	2
India	3

Final
17 September – Tehran
Iran	3
India	1
3rd place
17 September – Tehran
South Korea	0
China	3

=== Semifinals ===
Date		Score		Set 1	Set 2	Set 3	Set 4	Set 5	Total
16 Sep	China	2–3	India	23–25	17–25	25–21	25–23	10–15	100–109
16 Sep	Iran	3–2	South Korea	25–21	16–25	25–22	21–25	15–11	102–104

=== 3rd place ===
Date		Score		Set 1	Set 2	Set 3	Set 4	Set 5	Total
17 Sep	South Korea	0–3	China	24–26	23–25	19–25			66–76

=== Final ===
Date		Score		Set 1	Set 2	Set 3	Set 4	Set 5	Total
17 Sep	Iran	3–1	India	21–25	29–27	25–17	25–17		100–86

== Final standing ==
Rank	Team
1st place, gold medalist(s)	Iran
2nd place, silver medalist(s)	India
3rd place, bronze medalist(s)	China
4	South Korea
5	Pakistan
6	Bahrain
7	Chinese Taipei
8	Qatar
9	Australia
10	Japan
11	United Arab Emirates
12	Thailand
13	Kuwait
14	Yemen

Qualified for the 2003 World Junior Championship
Qualified for the 2003 World Junior Championship as host

2002 Asian Junior Men's champions

Iran
Second title

Team Roster

Rouhollah Kolivand, Davoud Moghbeli, Amin Moammeri, Mohsen Andalib, Saeid Mostafavand, Mehdi Mahdavi, Mahmoud Tavanaei, Mohammad Soleimani, Mikaeil Yolmeh, Vahid Sadeghi, Farhad Zarif, Behzad Behnejad

Head Coach: Mostafa Karkhaneh

== Awards ==
- MVP: (Iran) Rouhollah Kolivand
- Best spiker: (China) Yuan Xi
- Best blocker: (Iran) Davoud Moghbeli
- Best server: (Iran) Rouhollah Kolivand
- Best setter: (Iran) Behzad Behnejad
- Best receiver: (Iran) Farhad Zarif
