= Maldives men's national volleyball team =

National volleyball team

Maldives
- Association: Volleyball Association Maldives (VAM)
- Confederation: AVC
- Head coach: Mohamed Sajid
- FIVB ranking: NR (5 October 2025)

Uniforms
| Home | Away |

The Maldives men's national volleyball team represents Maldives in international volleyball competitions and friendly matches. Last Ranking in FIVB World Rankings is 65th.

== Competition history ==
=== CAVA Challenge Cup ===
- (Uzbekistan) 2024 — 5th place
