= 1998 Asian Junior Men's Volleyball Championship =

1998 Asian Junior Men's Championship

Tournament details
- Host country: Iran
- Dates: 8–15 October
- Teams: 12
- Venues: 2 (in 1 host city)

Final positions
- Champions: Iran (1st title)

Tournament awards
- MVP: (Iran) Alireza Nadi

The 1998 Asian Junior Men's Volleyball Championship was held in Azadi Volleyball Hall, Tehran, Iran from 8 October to 15 October 1998.

== Pools composition ==
The teams are seeded based on their final ranking at the 1996 Asian Junior Men's Volleyball Championship.

Pool A	Pool B
Iran (Host); Japan (3rd); South Korea; Australia; Qatar; Sri Lanka	China (1st); Chinese Taipei (2nd); Pakistan; Kazakhstan; India; United Arab Emirates

== Preliminary round ==
=== Pool A ===
Pos	Team	Pld	W	L	Pts	SW	SL	SR	SPW	SPL	SPR	Qualification
1	Iran	5	5	0	10	15	1	15.000	240	97	2.474	Championship round
2	South Korea	5	4	1	9	12	4	3.000	211	155	1.361	Championship round
3	Australia	5	3	2	8	10	7	1.429	217	207	1.048	5th–8th classification
4	Japan	5	2	3	7	7	9	0.778	194	199	0.975	5th–8th classification
5	Qatar	5	1	4	6	3	12	0.250	120	196	0.612	9th–12th classification
6	Sri Lanka	5	0	5	5	1	15	0.067	109	237	0.460	9th–12th classification

Date	Time		Score		Set 1	Set 2	Set 3	Set 4	Set 5	Total
08 Oct	15:30	Australia	3–0	Sri Lanka	15–3	15–11	16–14			46–28
08 Oct	17:30	Iran	3–0	Japan	15–13	15–3	15–12			45–28
08 Oct	19:30	Qatar	0–3	South Korea	9–15	2–15	8–15			19–45
09 Oct	09:00	Sri Lanka	0–3	Japan	9–15	7–15	8–15			25–45
09 Oct	11:00	Australia	0–3	South Korea	13–15	13–15	10–15			36–45
09 Oct	17:30	Iran	3–0	Qatar	15–3	15–3	15–4			45–10
10 Oct	15:30	Japan	3–0	Qatar	15–7	15–13	15–4			45–24
10 Oct	17:30	Iran	3–1	Australia	15–17	15–2	15–4	15–7		60–30
10 Oct	19:30	South Korea	3–1	Sri Lanka	15–3	11–15	15–5	15–8		56–31
11 Oct	11:00	Qatar	3–0	Sri Lanka	15–6	15–4	15–6			45–16
11 Oct	13:30	Japan	1–3	Australia	15–17	11–15	15–13	11–15		52–60
11 Oct	17:30	Iran	3–0	South Korea	15–4	15–9	15–7			45–20
12 Oct	09:00	Qatar	0–3	Australia	2–15	9–15	11–15			22–45
12 Oct	15:30	South Korea	3–0	Japan	15–8	15–8	15–8			45–24
12 Oct	17:30	Iran	3–0	Sri Lanka	15–4	15–2	15–3			45–9

=== Pool B ===
Pos	Team	Pld	W	L	Pts	SW	SL	SR	SPW	SPL	SPR	Qualification
1	Chinese Taipei	5	5	0	10	15	4	3.750	0	0	—	Championship round
2	China	5	4	1	9	13	5	2.600	0	0	—	Championship round
3	India	5	3	2	8	13	6	2.167	0	0	—	5th–8th classification
4	Pakistan	5	2	3	7	6	10	0.600	0	0	—	5th–8th classification
5	United Arab Emirates	5	1	4	6	4	13	0.308	0	0	—	9th–12th classification
6	Kazakhstan	5	0	5	4	2	15	0.133	0	0	—	9th–12th classification

Date	Time		Score		Set 1	Set 2	Set 3	Set 4	Set 5	Total
08 Oct	09:00	India	3–0	Kazakhstan	15–0	15–0	15–0			Forfeit
08 Oct	11:00	Pakistan	0–3	China						
08 Oct	13:30	United Arab Emirates	0–3	Chinese Taipei						
09 Oct	13:30	Pakistan	3–1	United Arab Emirates						
09 Oct	15:30	Kazakhstan	0–3	China						
09 Oct	19:30	India	2–3	Chinese Taipei						
10 Oct	09:00	China	3–0	United Arab Emirates						
10 Oct	11:00	Chinese Taipei	3–1	Kazakhstan						
10 Oct	13:30	India	3–0	Pakistan						
11 Oct	09:30	Chinese Taipei	3–0	Pakistan						
11 Oct	15:30	Kazakhstan	1–3	United Arab Emirates						
11 Oct	19:30	China	3–2	India						
12 Oct	11:00	United Arab Emirates	0–3	India						
12 Oct	13:30	Pakistan	3–0	Kazakhstan						
12 Oct	19:30	Chinese Taipei	3–1	China						

== Final round ==
- The results and the points of the matches between the same teams that were already played during the preliminary round shall be taken into account for the final round.

=== Classification 9th–12th ===
Pos	Team	Pld	W	L	Pts	SW	SL	SR	SPW	SPL	SPR
9	United Arab Emirates	3	2	1	5	8	4	2.000	0	0	—
10	Kazakhstan	3	2	1	5	7	6	1.167	0	0	—
11	Qatar	3	1	2	4	4	6	0.667	0	0	—
12	Sri Lanka	3	1	2	4	5	8	0.625	0	0	—

Date	Time		Score		Set 1	Set 2	Set 3	Set 4	Set 5	Total
14 Oct	09:00	Qatar	1–3	Kazakhstan						
14 Oct	11:00	Sri Lanka	3–2	United Arab Emirates						
15 Oct	10:00	Sri Lanka	2–3	Kazakhstan						
15 Oct	12:00	Qatar	0–3	United Arab Emirates						

=== Classification 5th–8th ===
Pos	Team	Pld	W	L	Pts	SW	SL	SR	SPW	SPL	SPR
5	India	3	3	0	6	9	2	4.500	0	0	—
6	Japan	3	1	2	4	5	7	0.714	143	150	0.953
7	Australia	3	1	2	4	5	7	0.714	138	167	0.826
8	Pakistan	3	1	2	4	4	7	0.571	0	0	—

Date	Time		Score		Set 1	Set 2	Set 3	Set 4	Set 5	Total
14 Oct	13:30	Australia	1–3	Pakistan	8–15	15–12	9–15	15–17		47–59
14 Oct	15:30	Japan	1–3	India	15–6	14–16	9–15	4–15		42–52
15 Oct	10:00	Japan	3–1	Pakistan	15–7	4–15	15–7	15–9		49–38
15 Oct	12:00	Australia	1–3	India	15–11	0–15	10–15	6–15		31–56

=== Championship ===
Pos	Team	Pld	W	L	Pts	SW	SL	SR	SPW	SPL	SPR
1	Iran	3	3	0	6	9	1	9.000	150	27	5.556
2	South Korea	3	2	1	5	6	6	1.000	149	162	0.920
3	Chinese Taipei	3	1	2	4	5	7	0.714	0	0	—
4	China	3	0	3	3	3	9	0.333	0	0	—

Date	Time		Score		Set 1	Set 2	Set 3	Set 4	Set 5	Total
14 Oct	17:30	Iran	3–0	China	15–5	15–5	15–2			45–12
14 Oct	19:30	South Korea	3–1	Chinese Taipei	16–14	15–11	15–17	15–11		61–53
15 Oct	14:00	South Korea	3–2	China	15–7	14–16	2–15	15–6	22–20	68–64
15 Oct	17:00	Iran	3–1	Chinese Taipei	15–17	15–2	15–5	15–1		60–25

== Final standing ==
Rank	Team
1st place, gold medalist(s)	Iran
2nd place, silver medalist(s)	South Korea
3rd place, bronze medalist(s)	Chinese Taipei
4	China
5	India
6	Japan
7	Australia
8	Pakistan
9	United Arab Emirates
10	Kazakhstan
11	Qatar
12	Sri Lanka

Qualified for the 1999 World Junior Championship

1998 Asian Junior Men's champions

Iran
First title

Team Roster

Behnam Mahmoudi, Mohammad Torkashvand, Mohammad Shariati, Alireza Nadi, Alireza Behboudi, Afshin Oliaei, Morteza Shiari, Amir Ahmadi, Hossein Moghaddamrad, Aghmohammad Salagh, Mehrdad Soltani, Farhad Kaveh-Ahangaran

Head Coach: Mostafa Karkhaneh

== Awards ==
- MVP: (Iran) Alireza Nadi
- Best scorer: (Iran) Behnam Mahmoudi
- Best spiker: (Iran) Mohammad Torkashvand
- Best blocker: (China) Liu Yuyi
- Best server: (Iran) Behnam Mahmoudi
- Best setter: (Iran) Mohammad Shariati
