= 2023 FIVB Volleyball Men's U21 World Championship squads =

This article shows the 12-player roster of all participating teams at the 2023 FIVB Volleyball Men's U21 World Championship.

== Pool A ==
=== Bahrain ===
A 12-player squad was announced on 6 July 2023.

Head coach: Saber Abdulwahed

No.	Pos.	Name	Date of birth (age)	Height	Club
1	OH	Husain Ehsan	2 April 2003 (aged 20)	1.94 m
4	S	Ali Al-Bosta	13 November 2003 (aged 19)	1.85 m
5	MB	Hasan Warqaa	24 April 2005 (aged 18)	1.99 m	(Bahrain) Dar Kulaib
6	OH	Sayed Hashem Ali	30 July 2003 (aged 19)	1.83 m	(Bahrain) Nabih Saleh
7	MB	Ali Abdulwahab	29 December 2004 (aged 18)	1.95 m	(Bahrain) Bani Jamra
8	OH	Ali Al-Arab	9 November 2003 (aged 19)	1.87 m	(Bahrain) Dar Kulaib
9	S	Sadeq Marhoon	16 February 2003 (aged 20)	1.79 m	(Bahrain) Nabih Saleh
10	OH	Sayed Ahmed Ali	28 October 2003 (aged 19)	1.88 m
12	L	Husain Ramadhan	12 February 2003 (aged 20)	1.72 m	(Bahrain) Nabih Saleh
13	L	Mohamed Abdulla	12 March 2005 (aged 18)	1.78 m
15	MB	Hasan Al-Aiwi	7 November 2004 (aged 18)	1.89 m	(Bahrain) Dar Kulaib
17	OH	Abbas Ehsan	13 August 2006 (aged 16)	1.89 m

=== Iran ===
A 12-player squad was announced on 6 July 2023.

Head coach: Gholamreza Momeni Moghaddam

No.	Pos.	Name	Date of birth (age)	Height	Club
2	L	Sajad Jelodarian	19 January 2003 (aged 20)	1.83 m	(Iran) Eefa Ceram Ardakan
3	MB	Mahdi Bayati	7 June 2004 (aged 19)	2.02 m
4	OH	Porya Hosseinpour	18 March 2003 (aged 20)	1.95 m
5	OH	Mobin Nasri	7 January 2003 (aged 20)	2.01 m	(Iran) Shahrdari Urmia VC
7	OH	Younes Javan	22 September 2003 (aged 19)	1.91 m	(Iran) Nian Electronic Khorasan
8	OP	Amir Mohammad Golzadeh	9 May 2003 (aged 20)	2.05 m	(Iran) Saipa Tehran VC
9	OH	Poriya Hossein Khanzadeh	1 July 2004 (aged 19)	1.98 m	(Iran) Haraz Amol
10	MB	Shayan Sepehri Fard	22 March 2004 (aged 19)	1.95 m	(Iran) Shahrdari Urmia VC
12	S	Pendar Momeni Moghaddam	14 April 2003 (aged 20)	1.92 m
13	MB	Erfan Norouzi	12 July 2003 (aged 19)	2.02 m	(Iran) Haraz Amol
15	S	Arshia Behnezhad	4 August 2003 (aged 19)	1.94 m	(Iran) Saipa Tehran VC
19	OH	Ali Haghparast	16 December 2004 (aged 18)	1.98 m

=== Thailand ===
A 12-player squad was announced on 4 July 2023.

Head coach: Kampol Sripo

No.	Pos.	Name	Date of birth (age)	Height	Club
1	S	Kritsadikon Bunsuk	22 June 2005 (aged 18)	1.80 m	Thailand National Sports
2	OH	Jakkrit Thanomnoi	8 June 2004 (aged 19)	1.85 m	(Thailand) Kasetsart University
3	OH	Kittipong Sangsak	27 February 2005 (aged 18)	1.85 m	(Thailand) Kham Thale so Wittaya School
4	OH	Panya Bootsamrit	8 January 2004 (aged 19)	1.90 m	Thailand National Sports
5	OP	Paitoon Paradech	17 June 2004 (aged 19)	1.89 m	Thailand National Sports
8	S	Pramot Yotsanthia	8 May 2003 (aged 20)	1.80 m	(Thailand) Nakhon Ratchasima College
9	MB	Withawat Ponsaen	4 June 2004 (aged 19)	1.95 m	(Thailand) Nakhon Ratchasima College
10	L	Phutidol Takabut	8 July 2003 (aged 19)	1.75 m	(Thailand) Samut Prakan VC
11	MB	Panupong Khumpumee	1 December 2003 (aged 19)	1.93 m	Thailand National Sports
15	OH	Suwit Aboubaca Sow	25 August 2003 (aged 19)	1.96 m	Thailand National Sports
18	L	Narathon Muangkot	6 April 2003 (aged 20)	1.69 m	(Thailand) Plookpanya School
19	MB	Chutiphong Muangkao	28 December 2004 (aged 18)	1.97 m	Thailand National Sports

=== Tunisia ===
A 12-player squad was announced on 6 July 2023.

Head coach: Hosni Karamosly

No.	Pos.	Name	Date of birth (age)	Height	Club
1	S	Walid Baccour	18 February 2003 (aged 20)	1.96 m	(France) Grand Nancy Volley-Ball
2	MB	Mahdi Ben Tahar	17 September 2004 (aged 18)	2.04 m
4	OP	Khaled Bouallegue	7 November 2003 (aged 19)	1.94 m
6	OH	Abdelaziz Kallel	11 June 2003 (aged 20)	1.99 m
7	OH	Adem El-Meddeb	1 April 2003 (aged 20)	1.85 m
11	L	Youssef Ben Arab	24 June 2003 (aged 20)	1.84 m
12	OH	Achref Bouaziz	11 October 2003 (aged 19)	2.00 m
13	OP	Slah Trabelsi	28 February 2003 (aged 20)	1.92 m
15	OH	Bassem Lemjid	25 October 2003 (aged 19)	1.91 m
17	S	Yassine Glaoui	17 June 2003 (aged 20)	1.87 m
19	MB	Ahmed Boussabah	14 April 2003 (aged 20)	2.05 m
20	MB	Ramzi Dhouibi	20 October 2003 (aged 19)	1.95 m

== Pool B ==
=== Brazil ===
A 12-player squad was announced on 5 July 2023.

Head coach: Guilherme Novaes

No.	Pos.	Name	Date of birth (age)	Height	Club
2	S	Gustavo Cardoso	28 June 2003 (aged 20)	1.90 m	(Brazil) Vôlei Guarulhos
5	L	Filipe Baioco	16 January 2003 (aged 20)	1.81 m	(Brazil) Minas Tênis Clube
6	OH	Guilherme Amorim	23 May 2004 (aged 19)	1.96 m	(Brazil) Vôlei Renata
7	MB	Thierry Nascimento	2 June 2003 (aged 20)	2.04 m	(Brazil) Vôlei Bauru
8	OP	Samuel Neufeld	18 August 2004 (aged 18)	2.03 m	(Brazil) Minas Tênis Clube
12	S	Eduardo Faquin	17 October 2004 (aged 18)	1.85 m	(United States) Park University
13	OH	João Lima	7 July 2003 (aged 20)	1.94 m	(Brazil) Goiás Vôlei
14	MB	Maicon França	27 April 2004 (aged 19)	2.15 m	(Brazil) Araguari Vôlei
17	OP	Bryan da Silva	1 November 2005 (aged 17)	2.04 m	(Brazil) Minas Tênis Clube
18	MB	Henrique de Paula	9 May 2005 (aged 18)	1.99 m	(Brazil) Minas Tênis Clube
19	OH	Arthur Bento	8 June 2004 (aged 19)	2.05 m	(Brazil) Minas Tênis Clube
20	OH	Lukas Bergmann	25 March 2004 (aged 19)	2.04 m	(Brazil) Vôlei Bauru

=== Egypt ===
A 12-player squad was announced on 5 July 2023.

Head coach: Hani Moselhi

No.	Pos.	Name	Date of birth (age)	Height	Club
4	OP	Zyad Mohamed	25 March 2003 (aged 20)	1.95 m
5	OH	Aly Khalifa	10 May 2003 (aged 20)	1.91 m
7	OH	Hazem Abdalla	26 February 2003 (aged 20)	1.92 m
11	S	Omar Hermash	1 October 2004 (aged 18)	1.97 m	(Egypt) Zamalek SC
12	L	Yassen Aboulhassan	20 January 2004 (aged 19)	1.76 m
13	S	Yassin Eid	28 January 2004 (aged 19)	1.80 m
14	OP	Ahmed El-Labany	15 July 2003 (aged 19)	1.83 m
15	MB	Ahmed Ibrahim	21 September 2003 (aged 19)	2.06 m
17	MB	Abdelrahman Mohammed	3 February 2003 (aged 20)	2.00 m	(Egypt) Zamalek SC
21	OH	Hamza Awad	17 September 2005 (aged 17)	1.88 m
22	MB	Abdalla Said	8 September 2003 (aged 19)	1.91 m
23	OH	Amr El-Zomor	16 February 2003 (aged 20)	1.92 m	(Egypt) Zamalek SC

=== Italy ===
A 12-player squad was announced on 4 July 2023.

Head coach: Matteo Battocchio

No.	Pos.	Name	Date of birth (age)	Height	Club
2	S	Mattia Boninfante	26 June 2004 (aged 19)	1.88 m	(Italy) Volley Treviso
5	MB	Nicolò Volpe	11 February 2003 (aged 20)	1.97 m	(Italy) Power Volley Milano
6	MB	Mattia Eccher	11 April 2003 (aged 20)	2.00 m	(Italy) Diavoli Rosa
7	OP	Alessandro Bovolenta	27 May 2004 (aged 19)	2.02 m	(Italy) Porto Robur Costa 2030
8	OP	Edwin Arguelles	17 June 2003 (aged 20)	1.98 m	(Italy) Kemas Lamipel
10	MB	Filippo Bartolucci	23 July 2003 (aged 19)	1.96 m	(Italy) Volley Lube
11	S	Alessandro Fanizza	11 December 2004 (aged 18)	1.92 m	(Italy) Matervolley Castellana
13	L	Gabriele Laurenzano	12 June 2003 (aged 20)	1.76 m	(Italy) Trentino Volley
14	OH	Mattia Orioli	23 March 2004 (aged 19)	1.99 m	(Italy) Volley Club Cesena
15	L	Matteo Staforini	23 May 2003 (aged 20)	1.91 m	(Italy) Diavoli Rosa
18	OH	Riccardo Iervolino	22 January 2003 (aged 20)	1.96 m	(Italy) Pallavolo Padova
19	OH	Federico Roberti	19 March 2004 (aged 19)	1.90 m	(Italy) Virtus Volley Verona

=== Mexico ===
A 12-player squad was announced on 7 July 2023.

Head coach: Jorge Romero

No.	Pos.	Name	Date of birth (age)	Height	Club
1	MB	Juan García	24 June 2003 (aged 20)	2.06 m
2	OH	Jorge Hernández	14 August 2003 (aged 19)	1.97 m	(Mexico) Baja California
3	OH	Leonardo Maldonado	28 May 2003 (aged 20)	1.90 m
7	OH	Inés Vargas	24 July 2006 (aged 16)	1.95 m	(Mexico) Sinaloa
9	OH	Jorge Ibarra	21 October 2003 (aged 19)	1.91 m
10	L	Isai Castañeda	19 September 2003 (aged 19)	1.75 m
11	S	Alán Molina	28 June 2003 (aged 20)	1.85 m
12	S	Martín Arredondo	14 November 2004 (aged 18)	1.82 m
13	OH	Ramón González	20 January 2003 (aged 20)	1.97 m
15	MB	Diego Esquivel	13 June 2004 (aged 19)	1.95 m
20	MB	Hugo Beltrán	24 December 2003 (aged 19)	1.90 m
22	OP	Ángel Domínguez	12 March 2004 (aged 19)	2.09 m

== Pool C ==
=== Bulgaria ===
A 12-player squad was announced on 4 July 2023.

Head coach: Andrea Burattini

No.	Pos.	Name	Date of birth (age)	Height	Club
3	MB	Lazar Bouchkov	12 May 2004 (aged 19)	1.98 m	(Bulgaria) Levski Volley
4	OH	Erik Stoev	10 April 2003 (aged 20)	1.92 m	(Bulgaria) Slivnishki Geroy
5	S	Borislav Nikolov	7 June 2003 (aged 20)	1.95 m	(Bulgaria) Deya Volley
6	OP	Venislav Antov	6 April 2004 (aged 19)	1.96 m	(Bulgaria) Levski Volley
8	OH	Daniel Pavlov	1 March 2004 (aged 19)	1.88 m	(Bulgaria) Levski Volley
9	OH	Vladimir Garkov	2 October 2003 (aged 19)	1.97 m	(Bulgaria) Levski Volley
10	S	Stoil Palev	21 May 2003 (aged 20)	1.88 m	(Bulgaria) Levski Volley
11	OH	Aleksandar Nikolov	30 November 2003 (aged 19)	2.07 m	(Italy) Volley Lube
12	OP	Georgi Tatarov	10 May 2003 (aged 20)	1.98 m	(Bulgaria) CSKA Sofia
13	MB	Ivaylo Damyanov	11 January 2003 (aged 20)	2.01 m	(Bulgaria) Marek Union-Ivkoni
14	L	Georgi Mitov	27 July 2003 (aged 19)	1.85 m	(Bulgaria) Slivnishki Geroy
15	MB	Viktor Bodurov	5 July 2003 (aged 20)	1.99 m	(Bulgaria) Slavia 2017

=== Canada ===
A 12-player squad was announced on 6 July 2023.

Head coach: Arnd Ludwig

No.	Pos.	Name	Date of birth (age)	Height	Club
1	OP	Brendan Mills	22 March 2003 (aged 20)	2.00 m	(Canada) McMaster Marauders
2	S	Samuel Ludwig	8 August 2004 (aged 18)	1.93 m	(Canada) Manitoba Bisons
4	S	Mason Greves	26 February 2003 (aged 20)	1.85 m	(Canada) UBC Thunderbirds
5	L	Josh Jehle	20 January 2003 (aged 20)	1.81 m	(Canada) Manitoba Bisons
7	OH	Kaden Schmidt	1 October 2004 (aged 18)	1.95 m	(Canada) Trinity Western Spartans
9	MB	Lucas Musschoot	10 March 2004 (aged 19)	2.02 m	(Canada) Saskatchewan Huskies
10	OH	Isaiah Mamer	20 August 2004 (aged 18)	1.89 m	(Canada) Saskatchewan Huskies
11	MB	Cory Schoenherr	17 March 2003 (aged 20)	2.03 m	(Canada) Trinity Western Spartans
12	OH	Reeve Gingera	29 August 2004 (aged 18)	1.95 m	(Canada) UBC Thunderbirds
13	OH	Jacob Sargent	18 October 2004 (aged 18)	2.00 m	(Canada) Alberta Golden Bears and Pandas
16	OH	Spencer Grahame	3 April 2003 (aged 20)	1.99 m	(Canada) Manitoba Bisons
18	MB	Jonah Dueck	29 July 2003 (aged 19)	1.99 m	(Canada) Manitoba Bisons

=== India ===
A 12-player squad was announced on 6 July 2023.

Head coach: G. E. Sridharan

No.	Pos.	Name	Date of birth (age)	Height	Club
1	OH	Aman Kumar	10 January 2004 (aged 19)	1.97 m
2	OH	Bharanidharan Selvam	13 January 2003 (aged 20)	1.90 m
3	S	Sandeep	12 July 2003 (aged 19)	1.94 m
5	MB	Mohammad Razza	11 December 2004 (aged 18)	2.01 m
7	S	Sameer Chaudhary	29 July 2003 (aged 19)	1.96 m
9	OH	Tanish Choudhary	21 November 2004 (aged 18)	1.93 m	(India) SUNY Delhi
10	OP	Harshit Giri	2 September 2003 (aged 19)	1.98 m
11	MB	Dushyant Singh	3 December 2003 (aged 19)	2.05 m	(India) Kochi Blue Spikers
13	MB	Sachin Dagar	23 July 2003 (aged 19)	2.02 m
17	L	Karthikeyan Kaleeswaran	7 April 2003 (aged 20)	1.79 m
18	OP	Ajeet Sheko	10 October 2004 (aged 18)	1.94 m
19	OP	Yougank Baliyan	11 November 2004 (aged 18)	1.90 m

=== Poland ===
A 12-player squad was announced on 3 July 2023.

Head coach: Mateusz Grabda

No.	Pos.	Name	Date of birth (age)	Height	Club
1	MB	Jakub Majchrzak	13 May 2004 (aged 19)	2.07 m	(Poland) SMS PZPS Spała
2	OH	Kamil Szymendera	30 April 2003 (aged 20)	1.91 m	(Poland) AZS Olsztyn
6	OH	Jakub Olszewski	30 January 2003 (aged 20)	1.90 m	(Poland) Krispol Września
7	S	Kajetan Kubicki	9 February 2003 (aged 20)	1.90 m	(Poland) Cuprum Lubin
8	OP	Tytus Nowik	10 January 2003 (aged 20)	1.92 m	(Poland) Gwardia Wrocław
9	MB	Mateusz Kufka	8 November 2003 (aged 19)	2.04 m	(Poland) PSG KPS Siedlce
10	OP	Aliaksiei Nasevich	5 June 2003 (aged 20)	1.97 m	(Poland) Trefl Gdańsk
11	OH	Piotr Śliwka	3 June 2003 (aged 20)	1.88 m	(Poland) BKS Visła Bydgoszcz
14	L	Kuba Hawryluk	8 September 2003 (aged 19)	1.81 m	(Poland) AZS Olsztyn
16	MB	Mateusz Nowak	29 February 2004 (aged 19)	2.14 m	(Poland) SMS PZPS Spała
18	S	Damian Biliński	2 August 2003 (aged 19)	1.95 m	(Poland) Norwid Częstochowa
20	OH	Marcel Hendzelewski	29 February 2004 (aged 19)	1.90 m	(Poland) Lechia Tomaszów Mazowiecki

== Pool D ==
=== Argentina ===
A 12-player squad was announced on 4 July 2023.

Head coach: Sebastián Fernández

No.	Pos.	Name	Date of birth (age)	Height	Club
1	L	Manuel Albrecht	17 May 2004 (aged 19)	1.83 m	(Argentina) Club Ciudad de Bolívar
2	OH	Lucas Conde	6 October 2004 (aged 18)	1.93 m	(Spain) Club Voleibol Guaguas
4	S	Ezequiel Vázquez	7 March 2004 (aged 19)	1.82 m	(Argentina) Club Ciudad de Bolívar
6	OP	Germán Gómez	19 April 2003 (aged 20)	1.91 m	(Argentina) Mutual Policial
7	OH	Nahuel Rojas	28 November 2003 (aged 19)	1.92 m	(Argentina) River Plate
8	OH	Giuliano Turcitu	24 March 2003 (aged 20)	1.89 m	(Argentina) River Plate
11	MB	Nahuel García	28 January 2004 (aged 19)	1.94 m	(Argentina) Once Unidos
12	MB	Imanol Salazar	12 December 2003 (aged 19)	2.02 m	(Argentina) River Plate
14	MB	Nicolás Oldani	6 April 2003 (aged 20)	1.96 m	(Argentina) Mutual Policial
16	OP	Pablo Denis	21 March 2003 (aged 20)	2.02 m	(Argentina) River Plate
18	S	Luca Ovalles	31 October 2004 (aged 18)	1.82 m	(Argentina) Amuvoca
19	OH	Fausto Díaz	11 April 2006 (aged 17)	1.93 m	(Argentina) Náutico Avellaneda

=== Belgium ===
A 12-player squad was announced on 6 July 2023.

Head coach: Michel Mariën

No.	Pos.	Name	Date of birth (age)	Height	Club
1	S	Tijl Van Looveren	1 February 2003 (aged 20)	1.90 m	(Belgium) VBC Waremme
5	OP	Basil Dermaux	9 February 2003 (aged 20)	1.98 m	(Belgium) Volley Menen
7	OP	Ferre Reggers	18 July 2003 (aged 19)	2.03 m	(Belgium) VC Maaseik
8	MB	Jasper Verhamme	18 March 2004 (aged 19)	1.98 m	(Belgium) VT Marke-Webis
10	OP	Jippe Schroeven	4 March 2003 (aged 20)	1.99 m	(Belgium) VBC Waremme
11	OH	Sietse De Bruyn	8 March 2004 (aged 19)	1.93 m	(Belgium) Volley Haasrode Leuven
12	OH	Kobe Verwimp	13 January 2005 (aged 18)	1.81 m	(Belgium) Topsportschool Vilvoorde
16	OH	Lennert Beelaert	19 June 2003 (aged 20)	2.01 m	(Belgium) Volley Haasrode Leuven
17	MB	Simon Vlahovic	24 October 2003 (aged 19)	1.96 m	(United States) St. Francis Brooklyn Terriers
18	MB	Robbe Van Loon	18 November 2003 (aged 19)	2.03 m	(Belgium) VBC Waremme
19	OH	Pierre Perin	20 February 2004 (aged 19)	1.91 m	(Belgium) VBC Waremme
20	S	Robbe Ponseele	25 January 2005 (aged 18)	1.81 m	(Belgium) Topsportschool Vilvoorde

=== Czech Republic ===
A 12-player squad was announced on 5 July 2023.

Head coach: Jan Svoboda

No.	Pos.	Name	Date of birth (age)	Height	Club
7	OH	Jiří Benda	16 November 2003 (aged 19)	1.88 m	(Czech Republic) Black Volley Beskydy
9	MB	Jakub Klajmon	20 February 2003 (aged 20)	2.00 m	(France) Tours VB
11	S	Šimon Bryknar	12 September 2003 (aged 19)	1.93 m	(Czech Republic) VK Dukla Liberec
12	OP	David Kollátor	15 January 2003 (aged 20)	2.00 m	(Czech Republic) VK Lvi Praha
13	S	Martin Hilšer	14 November 2005 (aged 17)	1.90 m	(Czech Republic) SK Kojetín Volejbal
14	OH	Matěj Pastrňák	25 November 2005 (aged 17)	1.99 m	(Czech Republic) VK Karlovarsko
15	MB	Tomáš Bukáček	18 June 2003 (aged 20)	1.99 m	(Czech Republic) Volejbal Brno
16	L	Matěj Šálek	16 January 2003 (aged 20)	1.83 m	(Czech Republic) VK Lvi Praha
17	OP	Jakub Pelikán	30 September 2004 (aged 18)	1.94 m	(Czech Republic) VK Ostrava
18	MB	Jan Černý	26 March 2005 (aged 18)	2.12 m	(Czech Republic) VK Lvi Praha
19	OH	Jan Krča	17 November 2003 (aged 19)	1.94 m	(Czech Republic) VK Lvi Praha
21	OH	Josef Leština	6 September 2004 (aged 18)	2.02 m	(Czech Republic) VK České Budějovice

=== United States ===
A 12-player squad was announced on 30 June 2023.

Head coach: Andy Read

No.	Pos.	Name	Date of birth (age)	Height	Club
1	L	Ryan Merk	11 April 2003 (aged 20)	1.83 m	(United States) Penn State Nittany Lions
5	OH	Dillon Klein	11 June 2003 (aged 20)	1.93 m	(United States) USC Trojans
6	S	Island Doty	21 December 2003 (aged 19)	1.96 m	(United States) Long Beach State Beach
12	S	Andrew Rowan	29 July 2003 (aged 19)	2.01 m	(United States) UCLA Bruins
13	OP	Shane Wetzel	18 May 2004 (aged 19)	2.01 m	(United States) Ohio State Buckeyes
16	MB	Nyherowo Omene	5 June 2003 (aged 20)	2.03 m	(United States) Princeton Tigers
17	OH	Trent Moser	10 October 2003 (aged 19)	2.03 m	(United States) Arizona Wildcats
20	OH	Zach Rama	12 July 2004 (aged 18)	2.03 m	(United States) UCLA Bruins
21	MB	Marc Smith	9 September 2004 (aged 18)	2.11 m	(United States) Akron Zips
22	MB	Owen Rose	23 February 2003 (aged 20)	2.03 m	(United States) Penn State Nittany Lions
23	OH	Alex Rottman	5 February 2004 (aged 19)	2.01 m	(United States) Stanford Cardinal
25	OP	Theo Snoey	16 March 2004 (aged 19)	2.03 m	(United States) Stanford Cardinal
