= Martin Kryštof =

Czech volleyball player (born 1982)

Personal information
- Nationality: Czech
- Born: 11 October 1982 (age 44)
- Height: 1.79 m (5 ft 10 in)
- Weight: 78 kg (172 lb)
- Spike: 310 cm (122 in)
- Block: 300 cm (118 in)

Volleyball information
- Position: Libero
- Current club: Jihostroj České Budějovice
- Number: 11

Career
Teams
	Vavex Pribram; VK Dukla Liberec; SCC Berlin; Jihostroj České Budějovice

National team
2016–	Czech Republic

Martin Kryštof (born 11 October 1982) is a Czech male volleyball player. He is part of the Czech Republic men's national volleyball team and he participated at the 2010 FIVB Volleyball Men's World Championship in Italy. On club level he currently plays for Jihostroj České Budějovice as libero. He used to play for Vavex Pribram, VK Dukla Liberec and SCC Berlin.
