= Adam Zajíček =

Czech volleyball player (born 1993)

Personal information
- Nationality: Czech
- Born: 25 February 1993 (age 33); Prague
- Height: 6 ft 7 in (2.01 m)
- Weight: 203 lb (92 kg)
- Spike: 136 in (345 cm)
- Block: 130 in (331 cm)

Volleyball information
- Position: Middle blocker
- Current club: VK Kladno
- Number: 5

Career
Years	Teams
2013–2017; 2017–	VK Dukla Liberec; VK Kladno

National team
2013–	Czech Republic
Honours
Men's volleyball
Representing Czech Republic
European League
Bronze medal – third place	2013 Turkey
Silver medal – second place	2018 Czech Republic
Gold medal – first place	2021 Croatia

Adam Zajíček (born 25 February 1993) is a Czech volleyball player for VK Kladno and the Czech national team.

He participated at the 2017 Men's European Volleyball Championship.

== Sporting achievements ==
=== Clubs ===
Czech Cup:

- 2014, 2016

Czech Championship:

- 2015, 2016
- 2014, 2018
- 2017

=== National team ===
European League:

- 2018
- 2013
