= 2023–24 CEV Cup =

- League: CEV Cup
- Sport: Volleyball
- Duration: 24 October 2023 – 19 March 2024
- Number of teams: 44

Finals
- Champions: (Poland) Asseco Resovia
- Finals MVP: (France) Stéphen Boyer

CEV Cup seasons
- ← 2022–23 2024–25 →

The 2023–24 CEV Cup was the 52nd edition of the second most important European volleyball club competition organised by the European Volleyball Confederation.

This year’s edition of the CEV Cup consisted of 44 teams, of which 29 teams qualified directly for the CEV Cup; 11 teams were the losers from the Champions League qualification phase; and the remaining 4 joined the rest in the quarterfinals, being transferred there from the Champions League group stage as the 3rd placed teams in their respective pools.

Asseco Resovia won their maiden CEV Cup, beating SVG Lüneburg in the finals. Stéphen Boyer was named MVP of the final match.

== Participating teams ==
The drawing of lots was held on 19 July 2023 in Luxembourg City.

Rank	Country	Number of teams	Teams
1	Turkey	2	Fenerbahçe, Arkas İzmir
2	France	3	Chaumont VB 52, Narbonne Volley, Nantes Rezé Métropole
4	Czech Republic	2	Kladno volejbal cz, ČEZ Karlovarsko
5	Italy	1	Allianz Milano
6	Romania	1	SCM Craiova
7	Switzerland	3	Volley Amriswil, Chênois Genève, Volley Schönenwerd
8	Austria	3	SK Zadruga Aich/Dob, TSV Raiffeisen Hartberg, Hypo Tirol Innsbruck
9	Belgium	4	Decospan VT Menen, Caruur Volley Gent, Volley Haasrode Leuven, Greenyard Maaseik
10	Netherlands	2	Nova Tech Lycurgus Groningen, Draisma Dynamo Apeldoorn
12	Germany	2	SWD Powervolleys Düren, SVG Lüneburg
14	Spain	1	Río Duero Soria
15	Bulgaria	2	Hebar Pazardzhik, Neftochimic Burgas
16	Greece	3	PAOK Thessaloniki, AONS Milon, Olympiacos Piraeus
17	Ukraine	3	Epicentr-Podolyany Horodok, Zhytychi-Polissya Zhytomyr, SC Prometey Dnipro
18	Serbia	3	Vojvodina Novi Sad, Radnički Kragujevac, Partizan Beograd
19	Poland	2	Aluron CMC Warta Zawiercie, Asseco Resovia
20	Croatia	2	Mursa Osijek, Mladost Zagreb
21	Hungary	1	Fino Kaposvár
23	Finland	1	Ford Levoranta Sastamala
25	Bosnia and Herzegovina	1	Radnik Bijeljina
28	Montenegro	1	OK Budva
33	North Macedonia	1	Strumica Nikob

== Format ==
Qualification round (Home and away matches):

- 32nd finals

Main phase (Home and away matches):

- 16th finals → 8th finals → Playoffs → 4th finals

Final phase (Home and away matches):

- Semi-finals → Finals

Aggregate score is counted as follows: 3 points for 3–0 or 3–1 win, 2 points for 3–2 win, 1 point for 2–3 loss.
In case the teams are tied after two legs, a Golden Set is played immediately at the completion of the second leg.

== Qualification round ==
=== 32nd finals ===
Team 1	Agg.	Team 2	1st leg	2nd leg	Golden Set
Decospan VT Menen (Belgium)	3–3	(Ukraine) Epicentr-Podolyany Horodok	3–1	0–3	16–14
Zhytychi-Polissya Zhytomyr (Ukraine)	2–4	(Serbia) Vojvodina Novi Sad	3–2	1–3	
Mursa Osijek (Croatia)	0–6	(Turkey) Arkas İzmir	1–3	0–3	
Narbonne Volley (France)	0–6	(France) Nantes Rezé Métropole	0–3	1–3	
Caruur Volley Gent (Belgium)	2–4	(Czech Republic) Kladno volejbal cz	3–2	0–3	
Radnički Kragujevac (Serbia)	4–2	(Switzerland) Volley Amriswil	3–0	2–3	
Aluron CMC Warta Zawiercie (Poland)	6–0	(Austria) TSV Raiffeisen Hartberg	3–0	3–0	
AONS Milon (Greece)	5–1	(Switzerland) Volley Schönenwerd	3–1	3–2	

==== First leg ====
Date	Time		Score		Set 1	Set 2	Set 3	Set 4	Set 5	Total	Report
26 Oct	20:30	Decospan VT Menen (Belgium)	3–1	(Ukraine) Epicentr-Podolyany Horodok	29–27	22–25	25–18	25–19		101–89	Report
26 Oct	20:00	Zhytychi-Polissya Zhytomyr (Ukraine)	3–2	(Serbia) Vojvodina Novi Sad	26–24	22–25	25–16	21–25	15–10	109–100	Report
25 Oct	18:00	Mursa Osijek (Croatia)	1–3	(Turkey) Arkas İzmir	19–25	25–23	14–25	18–25		76–98	Report
24 Oct	19:30	Narbonne Volley (France)	0–3	(France) Nantes Rezé Métropole	17–25	18–25	16–25			51–75	Report
25 Oct	20:30	Caruur Volley Gent (Belgium)	3–2	(Czech Republic) Kladno volejbal cz	25–22	17–25	21–25	27–25	16–14	106–111	Report
25 Oct	18:00	Radnički Kragujevac (Serbia)	3–0	(Switzerland) Volley Amriswil	25–22	32–30	32–30			89–82	Report
25 Oct	19:00	Aluron CMC Warta Zawiercie (Poland)	3–0	(Austria) TSV Raiffeisen Hartberg	25–14	25–14	25–21			75–49	Report
25 Oct	20:00	AONS Milon (Greece)	3–1	(Switzerland) Volley Schönenwerd	25–21	25–19	24–26	25–20		99–86	Report

==== Second leg ====
Date	Time		Score		Set 1	Set 2	Set 3	Set 4	Set 5	Total	Report
2 Nov	18:00	Epicentr-Podolyany Horodok (Ukraine)	3–0	(Belgium) Decospan VT Menen	25–19	25–14	25–22			75–55	Report
Golden set		Epicentr-Podolyany Horodok (Ukraine)	14–16	(Belgium) Decospan VT Menen							
1 Nov	19:00	Vojvodina Novi Sad (Serbia)	3–1	(Ukraine) Zhytychi-Polissya Zhytomyr	25–20	25–18	19–25	25–18		94–81	Report
1 Nov	19:00	Arkas İzmir (Turkey)	3–0	(Croatia) Mursa Osijek	25–21	25–13	25–19			75–53	Report
1 Nov	20:00	Nantes Rezé Métropole (France)	3–1	(France) Narbonne Volley	25–17	21–25	25–22	25–23		96–87	Report
1 Nov	18:00	Kladno volejbal cz (Czech Republic)	3–0	(Belgium) Caruur Volley Gent	25–17	25–14	25–20			75–51	Report
1 Nov	19:00	Volley Amriswil (Switzerland)	3–2	(Serbia) Radnički Kragujevac	23–25	25–23	25–23	24–26	15–9	112–106	Report
31 Oct	19:30	TSV Raiffeisen Hartberg (Austria)	0–3	(Poland) Aluron CMC Warta Zawiercie	23–25	20–25	20–25			63–75	Report
1 Nov	19:30	Volley Schönenwerd (Switzerland)	2–3	(Greece) AONS Milon	17–25	25–19	22–25	25–22	13–15	102–106	Report

== Main phase ==
=== 16th finals ===
Team 1	Agg.	Team 2	1st leg	2nd leg	Golden Set
Vojvodina Novi Sad (Serbia)	0–6	(Spain) Río Duero Soria	0–3	0–3	
Fino Kaposvár (Hungary)	1–5	(Switzerland) Chênois Genève	0–3	2–3	
Neftochimic Burgas (Bulgaria)	0–6	(Turkey) Arkas İzmir	0–3	0–3	
Ford Levoranta Sastamala (Finland)	0–6	(Czech Republic) ČEZ Karlovarsko	1–3	0–3	
Strumica Nikob (North Macedonia)	0–6	(Germany) SWD Powervolleys Düren	0–3	0–3	
AONS Milon (Greece)	4–2	(Austria) SK Zadruga Aich/Dob	3–0	2–3	
Kladno volejbal cz (Czech Republic)	6–0	(Bosnia and Herzegovina) Radnik Bijeljina	3–0	3–1	
Nantes Rezé Métropole (France)	5–1	(France) Chaumont VB 52	3–1	3–2	
Aluron CMC Warta Zawiercie (Poland)	4–2	(Bulgaria) Hebar Pazardzhik	3–0	2–3	
Radnički Kragujevac (Serbia)	2–4	(Romania) SCM Craiova	3–2	1–3	
Mladost Zagreb (Croatia)	0–6	(Greece) PAOK Thessaloniki	0–3	0–3	
Decospan VT Menen (Belgium)	1–5 (Note: Order of legs reversed after original draw.)	(Italy) Allianz Milano	0–3	2–3	
SC Prometey Dnipro (Ukraine)	6–0	(Netherlands) Nova Tech Lycurgus Groningen	3–0	3–0	
Partizan Beograd (Serbia)	3–3	(Belgium) Volley Haasrode Leuven	0–3	3–1	15–13
OK Budva (Montenegro)	3–3	(Netherlands) Draisma Dynamo Apeldoorn	3–0	0–3	17–19
Hypo Tirol Innsbruck (Austria)	2–4	(Turkey) Fenerbahçe	3–2	1–3	

==== First leg ====
Date	Time		Score		Set 1	Set 2	Set 3	Set 4	Set 5	Total	Report
22 Nov	19:00	Vojvodina Novi Sad (Serbia)	0–3	(Spain) Río Duero Soria	24–26	22–25	20–25			66–76	Report
22 Nov	18:00	Fino Kaposvár (Hungary)	0–3	(Switzerland) Chênois Genève	23–25	20–25	24–26			67–76	Report
23 Nov	19:00	Neftochimic Burgas (Bulgaria)	0–3	(Turkey) Arkas İzmir	14–25	17–25	21–25			52–75	Report
22 Nov	18:30	Ford Levoranta Sastamala (Finland)	1–3	(Czech Republic) ČEZ Karlovarsko	25–20	23–25	33–35	23–25		104–105	Report
23 Nov	19:00	Strumica Nikob (North Macedonia)	0–3	(Germany) SWD Powervolleys Düren	15–25	19–25	17–25			51–75	Report
22 Nov	20:00	AONS Milon (Greece)	3–0	(Austria) SK Zadruga Aich/Dob	26–24	25–17	25–22			76–63	Report
22 Nov	18:00	Kladno volejbal cz (Czech Republic)	3–0	(Bosnia and Herzegovina) Radnik Bijeljina	25–18	25–19	25–15			75–52	Report
22 Nov	20:00	Nantes Rezé Métropole (France)	3–1	(France) Chaumont VB 52	15–25	25–23	25–21	25–21		90–90	Report
23 Nov	19:00	Aluron CMC Warta Zawiercie (Poland)	3–0	(Bulgaria) Hebar Pazardzhik	25–19	25–13	25–18			75–50	Report
23 Nov	18:00	Radnički Kragujevac (Serbia)	3–2	(Romania) SCM Craiova	23–25	25–18	25–17	21–25	30–28	124–113	Report
22 Nov	19:00	Mladost Zagreb (Croatia)	0–3	(Greece) PAOK Thessaloniki	28–30	22–25	19–25			69–80	Report
22 Nov	20:30	Allianz Milano (Italy)	3–0	(Belgium) Decospan VT Menen	25–13	25–21	25–15			75–49	Report
23 Nov	18:00	SC Prometey Dnipro (Ukraine)	3–0	(Netherlands) Nova Tech Lycurgus Groningen	25–21	25–17	25–16			75–54	Report
23 Nov	18:00	Partizan Beograd (Serbia)	0–3	(Belgium) Volley Haasrode Leuven	17–25	20–25	23–25			60–75	Report
23 Nov	18:00	OK Budva (Montenegro)	3–0	(Netherlands) Draisma Dynamo Apeldoorn	25–22	26–24	25–21			76–67	Report
22 Nov	19:00	Hypo Tirol Innsbruck (Austria)	3–2	(Turkey) Fenerbahçe	25–23	15–25	25–20	23–25	21–19	109–112	Report

==== Second leg ====
Date	Time		Score		Set 1	Set 2	Set 3	Set 4	Set 5	Total	Report
29 Nov	20:00	Río Duero Soria (Spain)	3–0	(Serbia) Vojvodina Novi Sad	25–21	25–23	25–16			75–60	Report
29 Nov	20:00	Chênois Genève (Switzerland)	3–2	(Hungary) Fino Kaposvár	20–25	22–25	25–15	25–15	15–12	107–92	Report
30 Nov	19:00	Arkas İzmir (Turkey)	3–0	(Bulgaria) Neftochimic Burgas	25–22	25–17	25–15			75–54	Report
29 Nov	18:00	ČEZ Karlovarsko (Czech Republic)	3–0	(Finland) Ford Levoranta Sastamala	25–18	25–21	25–23			75–62	Report
30 Nov	19:00	SWD Powervolleys Düren (Germany)	3–0	(North Macedonia) Strumica Nikob	25–18	25–19	25–23			75–60	Report
29 Nov	19:00	SK Zadruga Aich/Dob (Austria)	3–2	(Greece) AONS Milon	27–25	19–25	28–30	25–17	20–18	119–115	Report
29 Nov	18:00	Radnik Bijeljina (Bosnia and Herzegovina)	1–3	(Czech Republic) Kladno volejbal cz	17–25	17–25	25–23	22–25		81–98	Report
29 Nov	20:00	Chaumont VB 52 (France)	2–3	(France) Nantes Rezé Métropole	22–25	25–18	25–16	19–25	10–15	101–99	Report
29 Nov	19:00	Hebar Pazardzhik (Bulgaria)	3–2	(Poland) Aluron CMC Warta Zawiercie	13–25	25–27	26–24	25–17	15–13	104–106	Report
29 Nov	19:00	SCM Craiova (Romania)	3–1	(Serbia) Radnički Kragujevac	25–22	23–25	25–21	25–20		98–88	Report
30 Nov	19:00	PAOK Thessaloniki (Greece)	3–0	(Croatia) Mladost Zagreb	25–18	25–21	25–20			75–59	Report
29 Nov	20:30	Decospan VT Menen (Belgium)	2–3	(Italy) Allianz Milano	16–25	20–25	25–22	30–28	9–15	100–115	Report
29 Nov	19:30	Nova Tech Lycurgus Groningen (Netherlands)	0–3	(Ukraine) SC Prometey Dnipro	22–25	23–25	24–26			69–76	Report
29 Nov	20:30	Volley Haasrode Leuven (Belgium)	1–3	(Serbia) Partizan Beograd	25–19	22–25	23–25	20–25		90–94	Report
Golden set		Volley Haasrode Leuven (Belgium)	13–15	(Serbia) Partizan Beograd							
29 Nov	19:30	Draisma Dynamo Apeldoorn (Netherlands)	3–0	(Montenegro) OK Budva	25–20	25–18	25–18			75–56	Report
Golden set		Draisma Dynamo Apeldoorn (Netherlands)	19–17	(Montenegro) OK Budva							
29 Nov	19:00	Fenerbahçe (Turkey)	3–1	(Austria) Hypo Tirol Innsbruck	32–34	28–26	25–19	25–19		110–98	Report

=== 8th finals ===
Team 1	Agg.	Team 2	1st leg	2nd leg
Río Duero Soria (Spain)	4–2	(Switzerland) Chênois Genève	2–3	3–0
Arkas İzmir (Turkey)	5–1	(Czech Republic) ČEZ Karlovarsko	3–1	3–2
SWD Powervolleys Düren (Germany)	2–4	(Greece) AONS Milon	1–3	3–2
Kladno volejbal cz (Czech Republic)	2–4	(France) Nantes Rezé Métropole	3–2	0–3
Aluron CMC Warta Zawiercie (Poland)	6–0	(Romania) SCM Craiova	3–0	3–0
PAOK Thessaloniki (Greece)	0–6 (Note: Order of legs reversed after original draw.)	(Italy) Allianz Milano	0–3	1–3
SC Prometey Dnipro (Ukraine)	6–0	(Serbia) Partizan Beograd	3–0	3–0
Draisma Dynamo Apeldoorn (Netherlands)	0–6	(Turkey) Fenerbahçe	1–3	0–3

==== First leg ====
Date	Time		Score		Set 1	Set 2	Set 3	Set 4	Set 5	Total	Report
13 Dec	20:00	Río Duero Soria (Spain)	2–3	(Switzerland) Chênois Genève	25–23	21–25	18–25	25–19	20–22	109–114	Report
14 Dec	19:00	Arkas İzmir (Turkey)	3–1	(Czech Republic) ČEZ Karlovarsko	25–21	25–22	19–25	25–22		94–90	Report
13 Dec	19:00	SWD Powervolleys Düren (Germany)	1–3	(Greece) AONS Milon	25–23	23–25	20–25	23–25		91–98	Report
12 Dec	18:00	Kladno volejbal cz (Czech Republic)	3–2	(France) Nantes Rezé Métropole	26–28	20–25	25–19	25–17	15–13	111–102	Report
13 Dec	19:00	Aluron CMC Warta Zawiercie (Poland)	3–0	(Romania) SCM Craiova	25–18	25–14	25–14			75–46	Report
13 Dec	19:00	Allianz Milano (Italy)	3–0	(Greece) PAOK Thessaloniki	25–21	25–21	25–19			75–61	Report
14 Dec	18:00	SC Prometey Dnipro (Ukraine)	3–0	(Serbia) Partizan Beograd	25–19	25–9	25–15			75–43	Report
12 Dec	19:30	Draisma Dynamo Apeldoorn (Netherlands)	1–3	(Turkey) Fenerbahçe	16–25	25–23	19–25	16–25		76–98	Report

==== Second leg ====
Date	Time		Score		Set 1	Set 2	Set 3	Set 4	Set 5	Total	Report
19 Dec	20:00	Chênois Genève (Switzerland)	0–3	(Spain) Río Duero Soria	25–27	15–25	30–32			70–84	Report
19 Dec	18:00	ČEZ Karlovarsko (Czech Republic)	2–3	(Turkey) Arkas İzmir	18–25	26–24	22–25	30–28	12–15	108–117	Report
20 Dec	20:00	AONS Milon (Greece)	2–3	(Germany) SWD Powervolleys Düren	25–20	23–25	26–24	16–25	13–15	103–109	Report
19 Dec	20:00	Nantes Rezé Métropole (France)	3–0	(Czech Republic) Kladno volejbal cz	25–20	25–23	25–19			75–62	Report
21 Dec	19:00	SCM Craiova (Romania)	0–3	(Poland) Aluron CMC Warta Zawiercie	23–25	16–25	19–25			58–75	Report
21 Dec	18:00	PAOK Thessaloniki (Greece)	1–3	(Italy) Allianz Milano	20–25	18–25	25–20	20–25		83–95	Report
21 Dec	18:00	Partizan Beograd (Serbia)	0–3	(Ukraine) SC Prometey Dnipro	15–25	23–25	21–25			59–75	Report
20 Dec	19:00	Fenerbahçe (Turkey)	3–0	(Netherlands) Draisma Dynamo Apeldoorn	25–13	25–17	25–22			75–52	Report

=== Playoffs ===
Team 1	Agg.	Team 2	1st leg	2nd leg	Golden Set
Río Duero Soria (Spain)	0–6	(Turkey) Arkas İzmir	1–3	0–3	
AONS Milon (Greece)	3–3	(France) Nantes Rezé Métropole	3–2	2–3	15–13
Aluron CMC Warta Zawiercie (Poland)	6–0	(Italy) Allianz Milano	3–0	3–0	
SC Prometey Dnipro (Ukraine)	3–3	(Turkey) Fenerbahçe	3–1	0–3	11–15

==== First leg ====
Date	Time		Score		Set 1	Set 2	Set 3	Set 4	Set 5	Total	Report
10 Jan	20:00	Río Duero Soria (Spain)	1–3	(Turkey) Arkas İzmir	23–25	25–23	17–25	16–25		81–98	Report
11 Jan	20:00	AONS Milon (Greece)	3–2	(France) Nantes Rezé Métropole	25–22	25–23	16–25	23–25	15–12	104–107	Report
10 Jan	17:30	Aluron CMC Warta Zawiercie (Poland)	3–0	(Italy) Allianz Milano	25–23	25–19	25–19			75–61	Report
10 Jan	20:00	SC Prometey Dnipro (Ukraine)	3–1	(Turkey) Fenerbahçe	25–21	25–15	19–25	26–24		95–85	Report

==== Second leg ====
Date	Time		Score		Set 1	Set 2	Set 3	Set 4	Set 5	Total	Report
17 Jan	19:00	Arkas İzmir (Turkey)	3–0	(Spain) Río Duero Soria	25–22	25–20	25–23			75–65	Report
16 Jan	20:00	Nantes Rezé Métropole (France)	3–2	(Greece) AONS Milon	25–18	22–25	23–25	25–20	19–17	114–105	Report
Golden set		Nantes Rezé Métropole (France)	13–15	(Greece) AONS Milon							
18 Jan	20:00	Allianz Milano (Italy)	0–3	(Poland) Aluron CMC Warta Zawiercie	22–25	22–25	23–25			67–75	Report
18 Jan	19:00	Fenerbahçe (Turkey)	3–0	(Ukraine) SC Prometey Dnipro	25–17	25–21	25–23			75–61	Report
Golden set		Fenerbahçe (Turkey)	15–11	(Ukraine) SC Prometey Dnipro							

=== 4th finals ===
Team 1	Agg.	Team 2	1st leg	2nd leg	Golden Set
Olympiacos Piraeus (Greece)	2–4	(Turkey) Arkas İzmir	3–2	0–3	
SVG Lüneburg (Germany)	5–1	(Greece) AONS Milon	3–0	3–2	
Asseco Resovia (Poland)	3–3	(Poland) Aluron CMC Warta Zawiercie	3–0	0–3	15–11
Greenyard Maaseik (Belgium)	0–6	(Turkey) Fenerbahçe	0–3	0–3	

==== First leg ====
Date	Time		Score		Set 1	Set 2	Set 3	Set 4	Set 5	Total	Report
31 Jan	20:30	Olympiacos Piraeus (Greece)	3–2	(Turkey) Arkas İzmir	26–24	21–25	27–25	23–25	15–7	112–106	Report
31 Jan	19:00	SVG Lüneburg (Germany)	3–0	(Greece) AONS Milon	25–19	25–19	25–16			75–54	Report
1 Feb	18:00	Asseco Resovia (Poland)	3–0	(Poland) Aluron CMC Warta Zawiercie	25–22	25–16	25–23			75–61	Report
31 Jan	20:30	Greenyard Maaseik (Belgium)	0–3	(Turkey) Fenerbahçe	22–25	33–35	16–25			71–85	Report

==== Second leg ====
Date	Time		Score		Set 1	Set 2	Set 3	Set 4	Set 5	Total	Report
7 Feb	19:00	Arkas İzmir (Turkey)	3–0	(Greece) Olympiacos Piraeus	25–23	25–22	25–21			75–66	Report
8 Feb	20:00	AONS Milon (Greece)	2–3	(Germany) SVG Lüneburg	20–25	25–23	25–19	19–25	8–15	97–107	Report
8 Feb	19:55	Aluron CMC Warta Zawiercie (Poland)	3–0	(Poland) Asseco Resovia	25–19	25–19	25–19			75–57	Report
Golden set		Aluron CMC Warta Zawiercie (Poland)	11–15	(Poland) Asseco Resovia							
7 Feb	20:00	Fenerbahçe (Turkey)	3–0	(Belgium) Greenyard Maaseik	25–20	25–20	25–15			75–55	Report

== Final phase ==
=== Semifinals ===
Team 1	Agg.	Team 2	1st leg	2nd leg	Golden Set
Arkas İzmir (Turkey)	3–3	(Germany) SVG Lüneburg	3–0	1–3	8–15
Asseco Resovia (Poland)	6–0	(Turkey) Fenerbahçe	3–1	3–0	

==== First leg ====
Date	Time		Score		Set 1	Set 2	Set 3	Set 4	Set 5	Total	Report
21 Feb	20:30	Arkas İzmir (Turkey)	3–0	(Germany) SVG Lüneburg	27–25	25–23	25–20			77–68	Report
21 Feb	18:00	Asseco Resovia (Poland)	3–1	(Turkey) Fenerbahçe	25–12	25–17	22–25	25–21		97–75	Report

==== Second leg ====
Date	Time		Score		Set 1	Set 2	Set 3	Set 4	Set 5	Total	Report
28 Feb	19:00	SVG Lüneburg (Germany)	3–1	(Turkey) Arkas İzmir	17–25	25–23	30–28	25–18		97–94	Report
Golden set		SVG Lüneburg (Germany)	15–8	(Turkey) Arkas İzmir							
29 Feb	19:00	Fenerbahçe (Turkey)	0–3	(Poland) Asseco Resovia	14–25	17–25	26–28			57–78	Report

=== Finals ===
Team 1	Agg.	Team 2	1st leg	2nd leg
SVG Lüneburg (Germany)	0–6	(Poland) Asseco Resovia	0–3	0–3

==== First leg ====
Date	Time		Score		Set 1	Set 2	Set 3	Set 4	Set 5	Total	Report
12 Mar	19:00	SVG Lüneburg (Germany)	0–3	(Poland) Asseco Resovia	16–25	17–25	21–25			54–75	Report

==== Second leg ====
Date	Time		Score		Set 1	Set 2	Set 3	Set 4	Set 5	Total	Report
19 Mar	18:00	Asseco Resovia (Poland)	3–0	(Germany) SVG Lüneburg	27–25	25–18	25–22			77–65	Report

== Final standings ==
Rank	Team
1st place, gold medalist(s)	(Poland) Asseco Resovia
2nd place, silver medalist(s)	(Germany) SVG Lüneburg
Semifinalists	(Turkey) Arkas İzmir (Turkey) Fenerbahçe

2023–24 CEV Cup winners
(Poland)
Asseco Resovia
1st title
