= Casey Adam Schouten =

Canadian volleyball player (born 1994)

Personal information
- Nationality: Canadian
- Born: 29 March 1994 (age 32)
- Height: 197 cm (6 ft 6 in)
- Weight: 94 kg (207 lb)
- Spike: 345 cm (136 in)
- Block: 320 cm (126 in)

Volleyball information
- Number: 25 (national team)

Career
Years	Teams
2013; 2013–2017; 2017–2018; 2018–2022 from 2022	(Canada) Miles Macdonell Collegiate (Canada) University of Winnipeg (Finland) Lakkapää (Germany) Netzhoppers Königs Wusterhausen (Czech Republic) Jihostroj České Budějovice (Czech Republic) VK Lvi Praha

National team
from 2015	Canada

Casey Adam Schouten (born 29 March 1994) is a Canadian male volleyball player. He is part of the Canada men's national volleyball team. On club level he plays for Narbonne Volley
