= 2023–24 CEV Champions League qualification =

This article shows the qualification phase for the 2023–24 CEV Champions League. 14 teams play in the qualification round. The three remaining teams will join the other 17 teams automatically qualified for the League round. All 11 eliminated teams will compete in the 2023–24 CEV Cup.

== Participating teams ==
The drawing of lots took place on 19 July 2023 in Luxembourg City.

Rank	Country	Team(s)	Outcome (Qualified to)
11	Serbia	Partizan Beograd	CEV Cup
13	Croatia	Mladost Zagreb	CEV Cup
14	Bulgaria	Neftochimic Burgas	CEV Cup
15	Finland	Ford Levoranta Sastamala	CEV Cup
16	Romania	CS Arcada Galați	CEV Champions League
17	Austria	Hypo Tirol Innsbruck	CEV Cup
18	Greece	Olympiacos Piraeus	CEV Champions League
20	Montenegro	OK Budva	CEV Cup
22	Netherlands	Draisma Dynamo Apeldoorn	CEV Cup
24	Bosnia and Herzegovina	Radnik Bijeljina	CEV Cup
26	Hungary	Fino Kaposvár	CEV Cup
27	Spain	Guaguas Las Palmas	CEV Champions League
47	North Macedonia	Strumica Nikob	CEV Cup
55	Ukraine	SC Prometey Dnipro	CEV Cup

== First round ==
- The teams are split into 4 groups.
- The winner of each pool and all 2nd ranked teams advance to the second round.
- All times are local.

=== Pool standing procedure ===
1. Number of victories
2. Points
3. Set ratio
4. Setpoint ratio
5. H2H results

Result	Winners	Losers
3–0	3 points	0 points
3–1	3 points	0 points
3–2	2 points	1 point

=== Pool I ===
Pos	Team	Pld	W	L	Pts	SW	SL	SR	SPW	SPL	SPR	Qualification
1	(Montenegro) OK Budva	3	2	1	6	7	3	2.333	229	207	1.106	Second round
2	(Bulgaria) Neftochimic Burgas (H)	3	2	1	6	6	3	2.000	211	182	1.159	Second round
3	(Hungary) Fino Kaposvár	3	2	1	6	6	4	1.500	243	208	1.168	
4	(North Macedonia) Strumica Nikob	3	0	3	0	0	9	0.000	139	225	0.618	

Source: CEV
(H) Tournament host

Date	Time		Score		Set 1	Set 2	Set 3	Set 4	Set 5	Total	Report
27 Oct	17:30	OK Budva (Montenegro)	1–3	(Hungary) Fino Kaposvár	18–25	28–26	18–25	14–25		78–101	Report
27 Oct	20:00	Neftochimic Burgas (Bulgaria)	3–0	(North Macedonia) Strumica Nikob	25–13	25–11	25–15			75–39	Report
28 Oct	17:30	OK Budva (Montenegro)	3–0	(North Macedonia) Strumica Nikob	25–15	25–16	25–16			75–47	Report
28 Oct	20:00	Fino Kaposvár (Hungary)	0–3	(Bulgaria) Neftochimic Burgas	25–27	19–25	23–25			67–77	Report
29 Oct	17:30	Strumica Nikob (North Macedonia)	0–3	(Hungary) Fino Kaposvár	20–25	15–25	18–25			53–75	Report
29 Oct	20:00	Neftochimic Burgas (Bulgaria)	0–3	(Montenegro) OK Budva	20–25	24–26	15–25			59–76	Report

=== Pool II ===
Pos	Team	Pld	W	L	Pts	SW	SL	SR	SPW	SPL	SPR	Qualification
1	(Greece) Olympiacos Piraeus	2	2	0	6	6	2	3.000	188	156	1.205	Second round
2	(Serbia) Partizan Beograd (H)	2	1	1	3	4	3	1.333	159	155	1.026	Second round
3	(Bosnia and Herzegovina) Radnik Bijeljina	2	0	2	0	1	6	0.167	134	170	0.788	

Source: CEV
(H) Tournament host

Date	Time		Score		Set 1	Set 2	Set 3	Set 4	Set 5	Total	Report
24 Oct	18:00	Radnik Bijeljina (Bosnia and Herzegovina)	0–3	(Serbia) Partizan Beograd	15–25	20–25	25–27			60–77	Report
25 Oct	18:00	Olympiacos Piraeus (Greece)	3–1	(Bosnia and Herzegovina) Radnik Bijeljina	25–10	25–18	18–25	25–21		93–74	Report
26 Oct	18:00	Partizan Beograd (Serbia)	1–3	(Greece) Olympiacos Piraeus	22–25	25–20	19–25	16–25		82–95	Report

=== Pool III ===
Pos	Team	Pld	W	L	Pts	SW	SL	SR	SPW	SPL	SPR	Qualification
1	(Ukraine) SC Prometey Dnipro	3	3	0	7	9	5	1.800	313	311	1.006	Second round
2	(Austria) Hypo Tirol Innsbruck (H)	3	2	1	6	7	4	1.750	286	264	1.083	Second round
3	(Finland) Ford Levoranta Sastamala	3	1	2	4	5	6	0.833	246	253	0.972	
4	(Netherlands) Draisma Dynamo Apeldoorn	3	0	3	1	3	9	0.333	273	290	0.941	

Source: CEV
(H) Tournament host

Date	Time		Score		Set 1	Set 2	Set 3	Set 4	Set 5	Total	Report
27 Oct	17:00	Ford Levoranta Sastamala (Finland)	3–0	(Netherlands) Draisma Dynamo Apeldoorn	25–19	30–28	25–22			80–69	Report
27 Oct	20:00	Hypo Tirol Innsbruck (Austria)	1–3	(Ukraine) SC Prometey Dnipro	23–25	32–30	23–25	22–25		100–105	Report
28 Oct	17:00	Ford Levoranta Sastamala (Finland)	2–3	(Ukraine) SC Prometey Dnipro	25–19	25–21	27–29	20–25	13–15	110–109	Report
28 Oct	20:00	Draisma Dynamo Apeldoorn (Netherlands)	1–3	(Austria) Hypo Tirol Innsbruck	25–23	36–38	23–25	19–25		103–111	Report
29 Oct	14:00	SC Prometey Dnipro (Ukraine)	3–2	(Netherlands) Draisma Dynamo Apeldoorn	25–22	13–25	21–25	25–18	15–11	99–101	Report
29 Oct	17:00	Hypo Tirol Innsbruck (Austria)	3–0	(Finland) Ford Levoranta Sastamala	25–15	25–19	25–22			75–56	Report

=== Pool IV ===
Pos	Team	Pld	W	L	Pts	SW	SL	SR	SPW	SPL	SPR	Qualification
1	(Spain) Guaguas Las Palmas (H)	2	2	0	6	6	0	MAX	150	105	1.429	Second round
2	(Romania) CS Arcada Galați	2	1	1	3	3	4	0.750	157	149	1.054	Second round
3	(Croatia) Mladost Zagreb	2	0	2	0	1	6	0.167	114	167	0.683	

Source: CEV
(H) Tournament host

Date	Time		Score		Set 1	Set 2	Set 3	Set 4	Set 5	Total	Report
24 Oct	19:30	CS Arcada Galați (Romania)	0–3	(Spain) Guaguas Las Palmas	22–25	21–25	22–25			65–75	Report
25 Oct	19:30	Mladost Zagreb (Croatia)	1–3	(Romania) CS Arcada Galați	17–25	23–25	25–17	9–25		74–92	Report
26 Oct	19:30	Guaguas Las Palmas (Spain)	3–0	(Croatia) Mladost Zagreb	25–8	25–14	25–18			75–40	Report

== Second round ==
- The teams are split into 2 groups, each one featuring four teams.
- The winner of each pool and the best 2nd placed team advance to the League round.
- All times are local.

=== Pool standing procedure ===
1. Number of victories
2. Points
3. Set ratio
4. Setpoint ratio
5. H2H results

Result	Winners	Losers
3–0	3 points	0 points
3–1	3 points	0 points
3–2	2 points	1 point

=== Pool V ===
Pos	Team	Pld	W	L	Pts	SW	SL	SR	SPW	SPL	SPR	Qualification
1	(Spain) Guaguas Las Palmas	3	3	0	9	9	1	9.000	248	202	1.228	League round (Pool D)
2	(Austria) Hypo Tirol Innsbruck	3	2	1	6	6	3	2.000	208	174	1.195	
3	(Serbia) Partizan Beograd (H)	3	1	2	3	4	7	0.571	227	263	0.863	
4	(Montenegro) OK Budva	3	0	3	0	1	9	0.111	199	243	0.819	

Source: CEV
(H) Tournament host

Date	Time		Score		Set 1	Set 2	Set 3	Set 4	Set 5	Total	Report
10 Nov	16:00	OK Budva (Montenegro)	0–3	(Spain) Guaguas Las Palmas	17–25	18–25	22–25			57–75	Report
10 Nov	19:00	Partizan Beograd (Serbia)	0–3	(Austria) Hypo Tirol Innsbruck	14–25	21–25	12–25			47–75	Report
11 Nov	17:00	Guaguas Las Palmas (Spain)	3–0	(Austria) Hypo Tirol Innsbruck	25–16	25–23	25–19			75–58	Report
11 Nov	20:00	OK Budva (Montenegro)	1–3	(Serbia) Partizan Beograd	21–25	22–25	25–18	22–25		90–93	Report
12 Nov	17:00	Hypo Tirol Innsbruck (Austria)	3–0	(Montenegro) OK Budva	25–20	25–14	25–18			75–52	Report
12 Nov	20:00	Guaguas Las Palmas (Spain)	3–1	(Serbia) Partizan Beograd	25–20	25–23	23–25	25–19		98–87	Report

=== Pool VI ===
Pos	Team	Pld	W	L	Pts	SW	SL	SR	SPW	SPL	SPR	Qualification
1	(Greece) Olympiacos Piraeus	3	3	0	9	9	3	3.000	299	260	1.150	League round (Pool A)
2	(Romania) CS Arcada Galați (H)	3	2	1	6	7	3	2.333	240	211	1.137	League round (Pool E)
3	(Ukraine) SC Prometey Dnipro	3	1	2	3	4	7	0.571	227	248	0.915	
4	(Bulgaria) Neftochimic Burgas	3	0	3	0	2	9	0.222	228	275	0.829	

Source: CEV
(H) Tournament host

Date	Time		Score		Set 1	Set 2	Set 3	Set 4	Set 5	Total	Report
10 Nov	18:00	CS Arcada Galați (Romania)	3–0	(Ukraine) SC Prometey Dnipro	25–15	25–21	25–14			75–50	Report
10 Nov	21:00	Olympiacos Piraeus (Greece)	3–1	(Bulgaria) Neftochimic Burgas	25–20	27–29	25–17	26–24		103–90	Report
11 Nov	18:00	Neftochimic Burgas (Bulgaria)	0–3	(Romania) CS Arcada Galați	20–25	25–27	16–25			61–77	Report
11 Nov	21:00	SC Prometey Dnipro (Ukraine)	1–3	(Greece) Olympiacos Piraeus	22–25	25–21	14–25	21–25		82–96	Report
12 Nov	15:00	Neftochimic Burgas (Bulgaria)	1–3	(Ukraine) SC Prometey Dnipro	20–25	17–25	25–20	15–25		77–95	Report
12 Nov	18:00	CS Arcada Galați (Romania)	1–3	(Greece) Olympiacos Piraeus	25–22	18–25	19–25	26–28		88–100	Report
