= Philip Maiyo =

Kenyan volleyball player (born 1982)

Personal information
- Full name: Philip Kipyego Maiyo
- Nationality: (Kenya) Kenyan
- Born: January 3, 1982 (age 44); Kenya
- Height: 2.00 m (6 ft 7 in)

Volleyball information
- Position: Opposite spiker

National team
Kenya

Philip Maiyo (born January 3, 1982, in Kenya). is a Kenyan international volleyball player.

One of the best players of the Bulgarian Volleyball League and a main weapon of its team in Champions League, he left CSKA Sofia in the summer of 2011 to play for CVM Tomis Constanța. Maiyo was transferred at the request of Martin Stoev.

== Personal life ==
His younger sister, Lydia, is also a volleyball player. She is also an opposite spiker and one of the best players of the Kenyan national team.
