= VC Slivnishki geroi (Slivnitsa) =

Slivnishki geroi
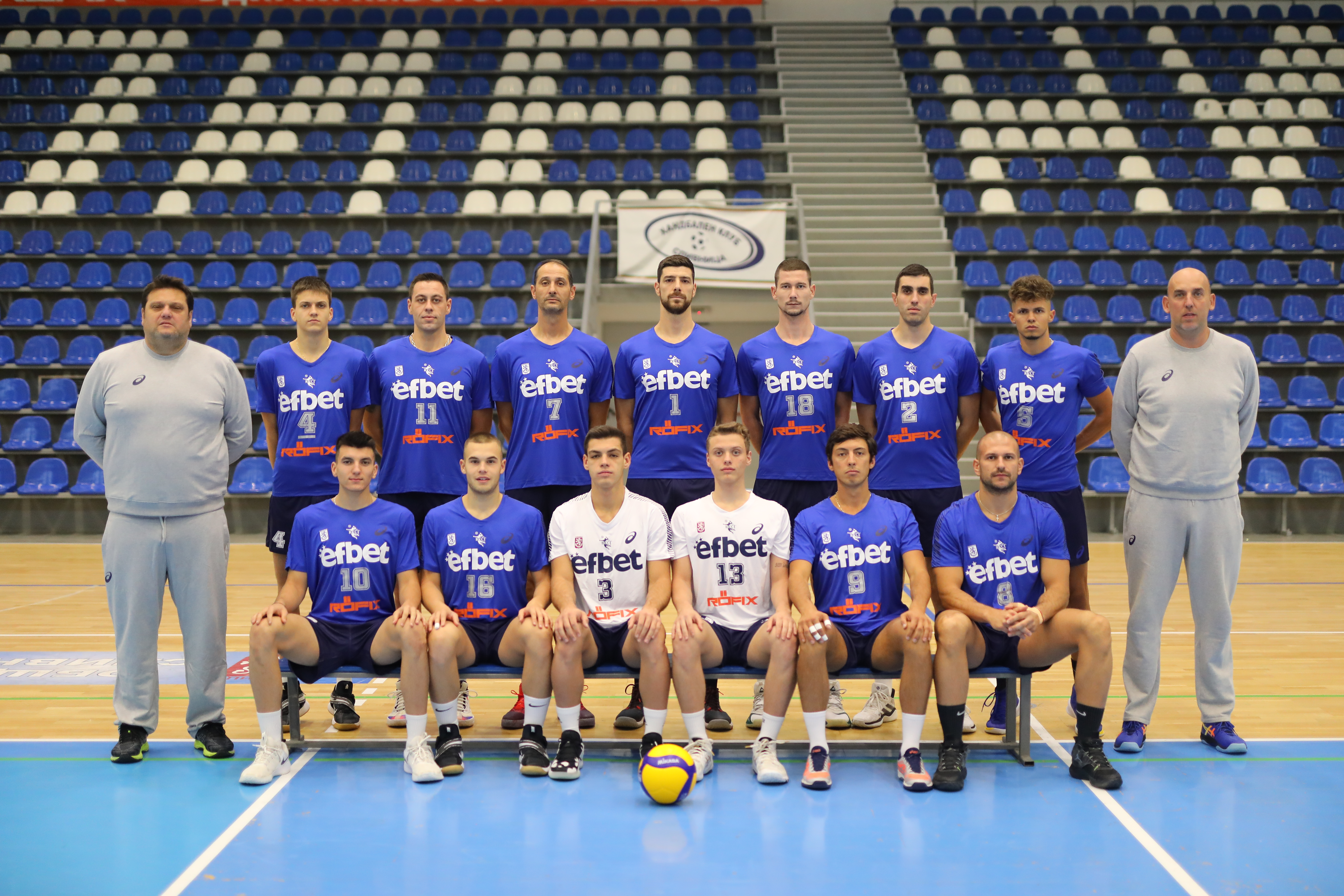
- Full name: VC Slivnishki geroi
- Nickname: Героите (The Heroes)
- Founded: 2015
- Ground: Arena Slivnitsa, Slivnitsa (Capacity: 15,000)
- Chairman: Martin Stoev
- Manager: Martin Stoev
- League: Bulgarian Premier Volleyball League
- 2020–2021: 1st (Champion)

Uniforms
Home	Away

VC Slivnishki Geroy (Slivnitsa) is a volleyball club from the town of Slivnitsa, Bulgaria, established in 2015 with the president of the club being the former volleyball player and national coach of Bulgaria Martin Stoev. Participant in the elite volleyball Bulgarian Volleyball Efbet Super League.

In the 2020/2021 Season, the team competes in the Bulgarian Volleyball League Zone A, after winning the Northwest Zone Group in the 2016/2017 Season, which entitles it to participate in a higher group. The coach of the team is Martin Stoev and the captain is Eric Stoev.

== Current Squad 2021/2022 ==
- Head Manager (Bulgaria) Martin Stoev
- Assistant Manager (Bulgaria) Alexander Popov
- (Bulgaria) Eric Stoev (Captain)
- (Bulgaria) Stoil Palev
- (Bulgaria) Valeri Todorov
- (Bulgaria) Metodi Ananiev
- (Bulgaria) Teodor Manchev
- (Bulgaria) Emil Iliev
- (Bulgaria) Georgi Levenov
- (Bulgaria) Ivan Tasev
- (Bulgaria) Pavel Dushkov
- (Bulgaria) Kostadin Stoykov
- (Bulgaria) Marian Nakov
- (Bulgaria) Boris Dimov
- (Bulgaria) Georgi Mitov

== Notable players ==
- (Bulgaria) Metodi Ananiev
- (Bulgaria) Velislav Yonev
- (Bulgaria) Kostadin Stoykov
- (Bulgaria) Emil Iliev
