= Jakub Novotný =

Czech volleyball player

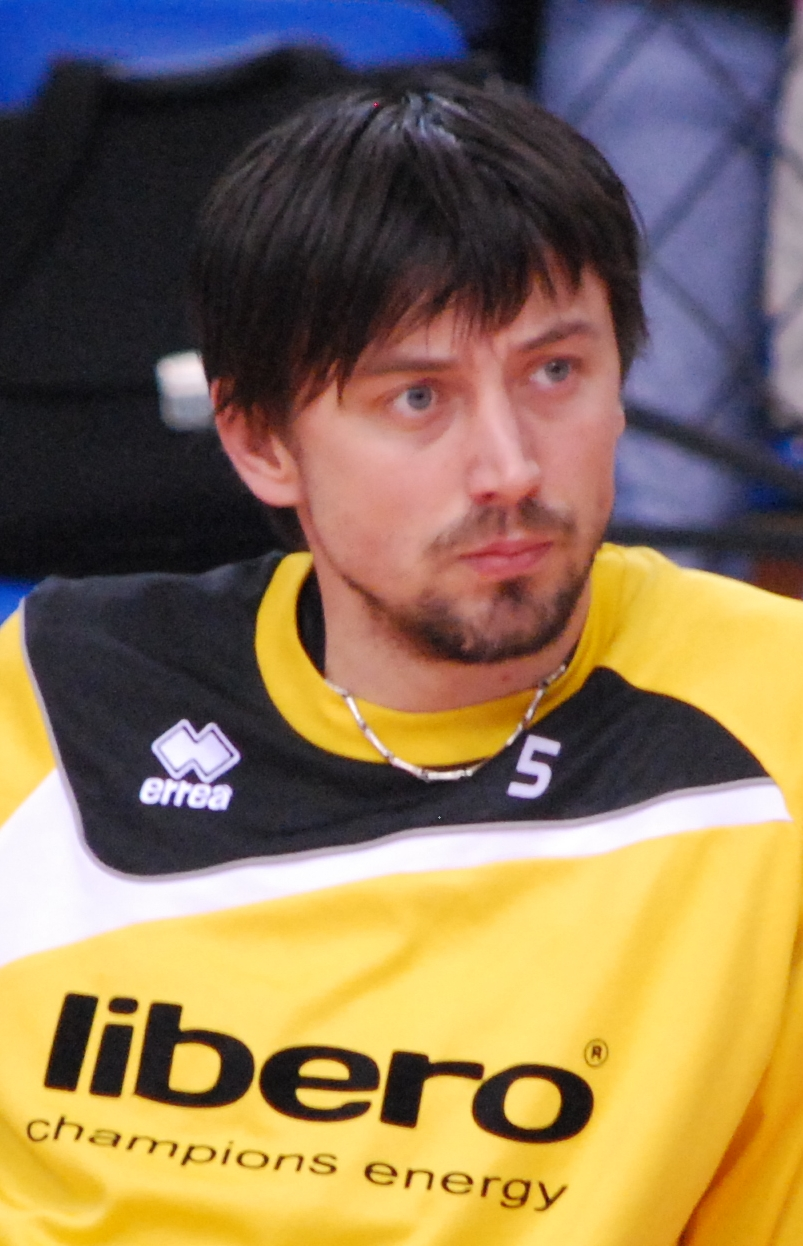

Personal information
- Nationality: Czech
- Born: 20 April 1979 (age 47); Sokolov, Czech Republic
- Height: 1.96 m (6 ft 5 in)

Volleyball information
- Position: Opposite

Career
Years	Teams
1998–1999; 1999–2001; 2001–2002; 2002–2003; 2003–2004; 2004–2005; 2005–2006; 2006–2007; 2007; 2007–2009; 2009–2011; 2011–2013	Baník Sokolov; Nice VB; Tourcoing LM; Stade Poitevin Poitiers; Schio Sport; Panathinaikos; Umbria Volley; VK Opava; Sparkling Volley Milano; ZAKSA Kędzierzyn-Koźle; Skra Bełchatów; Jihostroj České Budějovice

National team
Czech Republic
Honours
Men's volleyball
Representing Czech Republic
European League
Gold medal – first place	2004 Czech Republic

Jakub Novotný (born 20 April 1979) is a Czech former professional volleyball player, a former member of the Czech Republic national team.

== Career ==
With PGE Skra Bełchatów he won two titles of the Polish Champion (2010, 2011), Polish Cup and a bronze medal of the Champions League, two silver medals of the Club World Championship (2009, 2010). In 2011 he left club from Bełchatów and came back to Czech Republic. He was playing in Jihostroj České Budějovice for 2 seasons and then he decided to end up his career.

He serves as sports director of the Czech Volleyball Federation.

== Honours ==
=== Clubs ===
- FIVB Club World Championship
  - Doha 2009 – with PGE Skra Bełchatów
  - Doha 2010 – with PGE Skra Bełchatów
- National championships
  - 2009/2010 Polish Championship, with PGE Skra Bełchatów
  - 2010/2011 Polish Cup, with PGE Skra Bełchatów
  - 2010/2011 Polish Championship, with PGE Skra Bełchatów
  - 2011/2012 Czech Championship, with Jihostroj České Budějovice
  - 2012/2013 Czech Championship, with Jihostroj České Budějovice
