= Czech Men's Volleyball Extraliga =

Volleyball competition in the Czech Republic

Czech Volleyball Extraliga
- Current season, competition or edition: 2026–27 Czech Volleyball Extraliga
- Sport: Volleyball
- Founded: 1992
- First season: 1993
- Administrator: ČVS
- No. of teams: 13
- Country: Czech Republic
- Continent: Europe
- Most recent champions: ČEZ Karlovarsko (2025–26)
- Level on pyramid: 1 Level
- Relegation to: 2nd League
- Domestic cups: Czech Cup; Czech Super Cup
- International cups: CEV Champions League; CEV Cup; CEV Challenge Cup
- Website: cvf.cz

The Czech Men's Volleyball Extraliga is a men's volleyball competition organized by the Czech Volleyball Association (ČVS), it was created in 1992 Just after the dissolution of Czechoslovakia.

== League Previous Names ==
- 1992–1998 : Volejbalová extraliga mužů
- 1998–2010 : Kooperativa volejbalová extraliga mužů
- 2010–2024 : UNIQA volejbalová extraliga mužů
- 2024–present : ČEZ Extraliga muži

== History ==
Extraliga logo from 2010 to 2024

In the 2020/21 championship, 12 teams played in the Extraliga: Karlovarsko ( Karlovy Vary ), Jihostroy ( Ceske Budejovice ), Dukla ( Liberec ), Lions ( Prague ), Usti nad Labem, Ostrava, Aero ( Odolena-Voda ), Kladno, Brno, Black Valley Beskydy ( Frydek-Mistek ), Prishbram, Fatra ( Zlín ).

== Winners list ==
Season	1st place	2nd place	Third place
1992–93	Aero Odolena Voda	PVK Olymp Praha	
1993–94	Aero Odolena Voda	Spolchemie Ústí nad Labem	
1994–95	Setuza Ústí nad Labem	Aero Odolena Voda	
1995–96	Aero Odolena Voda	Setuza Ústí nad Labem	
1996–97	VK Setuza Ústí nad Labem	Jihostroj České Budějovice	Aero Odolena Voda
1997–98	VK Setuza Ústí nad Labem	Dukla Liberec	Jihostroj České Budějovice
1998–99	VSC Fatra Zlín	Jihostroj České Budějovice	Dukla Liberec
1999–00	Jihostroj České Budějovice	Dukla Liberec	VSC Fatra Zlín
2000–01	Dukla Liberec	Jihostroj České Budějovice	Aero Odolena Voda
2001–02	Jihostroj České Budějovice	Aero Odolena Voda	VO Kocouři Příbram
2002–03	Dukla Liberec	Chance Odolena Voda	Jihostroj České Budějovice
2003–04	Chance Odolena Voda	Dukla Liberec	VK Ostroj Opava
2004–05	VK volleyball.cz Kladno*	Dukla Liberec	Jihostroj České Budějovice
2005–06	VK DHL Ostrava	volleyball.cz Kladno	Dukla Liberec
2006–07	Jihostroj České Budějovice	Dukla Liberec	VK Opava
2007–08	Jihostroj České Budějovice	VK DHL Ostrava	volleyball.cz Kladno
2008–09	Jihostroj České Budějovice	VK Kladno	VK DHL Ostrava
2009–10	Brownhouse volleyball Kladno	Dukla Liberec	Jihostroj České Budějovice
2010–11	Jihostroj České Budějovice	VK DHL Ostrava	Fatra EkoSolar Zlín
2011–12	Jihostroj České Budějovice	Dukla Liberec	VO Kocouři Vavex Příbram
2012–13	VK Ostrava	Jihostroj České Budějovice	Dukla Liberec
2013–14	Jihostroj České Budějovice	Dukla Liberec	VSC Fatra Zlín
2014–15	Dukla Liberec	Jihostroj České Budějovice	ČEZ Karlovarsko
2015–16	Dukla Liberec	Volejbal Brno	Jihostroj České Budějovice
2016–17	Jihostroj České Budějovice	VK Kladno	Dukla Liberec
2017–18	ČEZ Karlovarsko	Kladno volejbal cz	Dukla Liberec
2018–19	Jihostroj České Budějovice	Dukla Liberec	VK Ostrava
2020–21	ČEZ Karlovarsko	Jihostroj České Budějovice	Dukla Liberec
2021–22	ČEZ Karlovarsko	VK Lvi Praha	Jihostroj České Budějovice
2022–23	VK Lvi Praha	Jihostroj České Budějovice	ČEZ Karlovarsko
2023–24	Jihostroj České Budějovice	VK Lvi Praha	Kladno volejbal cz
2024–25	VK Lvi Praha	ČEZ Karlovarsko	Jihostroj České Budějovice
2025–26	ČEZ Karlovarsko	VK Lvi Praha	Jihostroj České Budějovice
