= Kostadin Stoykov =

Bulgarian volleyball player (born 1977)

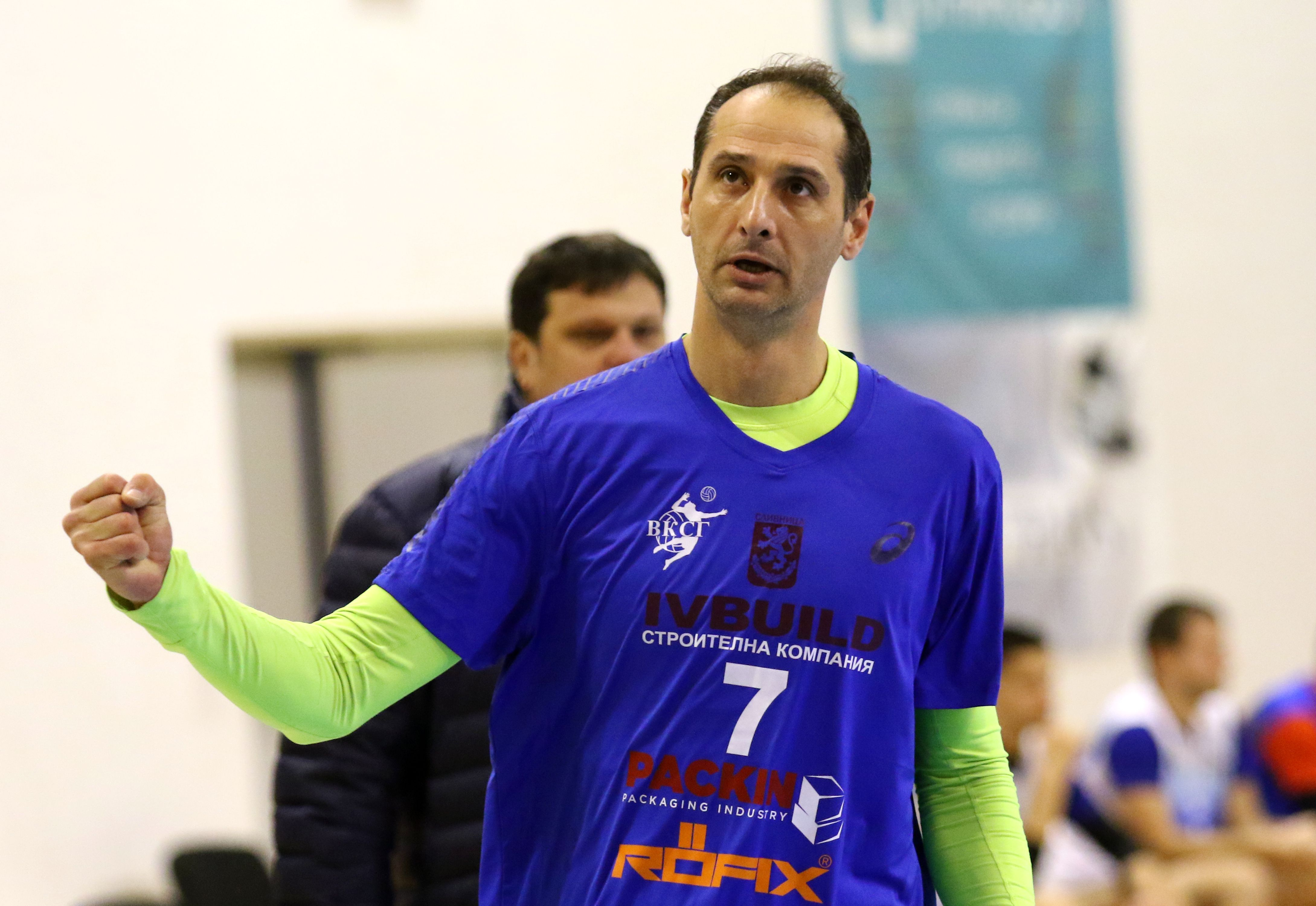

Personal information
- Nationality: Bulgarian
- Born: 7 December 1977 (age 47); Smolyan, Bulgaria

Sport
- Sport: Volleyball

Kostadin Stoykov (Bulgarian: Костадин Стойков, born 7 December 1977) is a Bulgarian volleyball player. He competed in the men's tournament at the 2008 Summer Olympics. Player of Bulgarian volleyball team VC Slivnishki geroi (Slivnitsa).
