= 2023–24 CEV Champions League =

- League: CEV Champions League
- Sport: Volleyball
- Duration: Qualifying round: 24 October – 12 November 2023; Main tournament: 22 November 2023 – 5 May 2024
- Teams: 31 (14 qual. + 17 main tourn.)

Finals
- Venue: (Turkey) Antalya
- Champions: (Italy) Itas Trentino
- Finals MVP: (Italy) Alessandro Michieletto

CEV Champions League seasons
- ← 2022–23 2024–25 →

The 2023–24 CEV Champions League was the 65th edition of the highest level European volleyball club competition organised by the European Volleyball Confederation.

== Qualification ==
Rank	Country	Number of teams			Qualified teams
Rank	Country	Vac	Qual	Total	Qualified teams
1	Italy	3	–	3	Itas Trentino
1	Italy	3	–	3	Cucine Lube Civitanova
1	Italy	3	–	3	Gas Sales Daiko Piacenza
2	Poland	3	–	3	Jastrzębski Węgiel
2	Poland	3	–	3	ZAKSA Kędzierzyn-Koźle
2	Poland	3	–	3	Asseco Resovia
4	Germany	3	–	3	Berlin Recycling Volleys
4	Germany	3	–	3	~~VfB Friedrichshafen~~ (Note: VfB Friedrichshafen were forced to withdraw from this year's edition of the Champions League due to unbearable venue rental costs.)
4	Germany	3	–	3	SVG Lüneburg
5	Belgium	2	–	2	Knack Roeselare
5	Belgium	2	–	2	Greenyard Maaseik
6	Turkey	2	–	2	Ziraat Bank Ankara
6	Turkey	2	–	2	Halkbank Ankara
7	Czech Republic	2	–	2	Lvi Praha
7	Czech Republic	2	–	2	Jihostroj České Budějovice
8	France	1	–	1	Tours VB
9	Slovenia	1	–	1	ACH Volley Ljubljana
10	Portugal	1	–	1	Sport Lisboa e Benfica
16	Romania	–	1	1	CS Arcada Galați
18	Greece	–	1	1	Olympiacos Piraeus
27	Spain	–	1	1	Guaguas Las Palmas

== Pools composition ==
The drawing of lots was held on 19 July 2023 in Luxembourg City.

Pool A	Pool B	Pool C
ZAKSA Kędzierzyn-Koźle	Itas Trentino	Berlin Recycling Volleys
Knack Roeselare	Asseco Resovia	Gas Sales Daiko Piacenza
Ziraat Bank Ankara	Tours VB	Halkbank Ankara
Olympiacos Piraeus	ACH Volley Ljubljana	Sport Lisboa e Benfica

Pool D	Pool E
Jastrzębski Węgiel	Cucine Lube Civitanova
SVG Lüneburg	Greenyard Maaseik
Jihostroj České Budějovice	Lvi Praha
Guaguas Las Palmas	CS Arcada Galați

== League round ==
- The teams are split into 5 groups, each one featuring four teams.
- The top team in each pool automatically qualifies for the quarterfinals.
- All 2nd placed teams and the best 3rd placed team qualify for the playoffs.
- The remaining 3rd placed teams will compete in the quarterfinals of the 2023–24 CEV Cup.
- All times are local.

=== Pool standing procedure ===
1. Number of victories
2. Points
3. Set ratio
4. Setpoint ratio
5. H2H results

Result	Winners	Losers
3–0	3 points	0 points
3–1	3 points	0 points
3–2	2 points	1 point

=== Pool A ===
Pos	Team	Pld	W	L	Pts	SW	SL	SR	SPW	SPL	SPR	Qualification
1	(Turkey) Ziraat Bank Ankara	6	6	0	16	18	6	3.000	544	508	1.071	Quarterfinals
2	(Poland) ZAKSA Kędzierzyn-Koźle	6	3	3	8	11	14	0.786	550	558	0.986	Playoffs
3	(Greece) Olympiacos Piraeus	6	2	4	6	8	12	0.667	452	469	0.964	2023–24 CEV Cup
4	(Belgium) Knack Roeselare	6	1	5	6	10	15	0.667	537	548	0.980	

Source: CEV

Date	Time		Score		Set 1	Set 2	Set 3	Set 4	Set 5	Total	Report
22 Nov	18:00	ZAKSA Kędzierzyn-Koźle (Poland)	3–1	(Greece) Olympiacos Piraeus	23–25	25–20	28–26	31–29		107–100	Report
23 Nov	20:30	Knack Roeselare (Belgium)	1–3	(Turkey) Ziraat Bank Ankara	19–25	25–19	24–26	24–26		92–96	Report
29 Nov	19:00	Olympiacos Piraeus (Greece)	0–3	(Belgium) Knack Roeselare	19–25	20–25	19–25			58–75	Report
29 Nov	20:00	Ziraat Bank Ankara (Turkey)	3–2	(Poland) ZAKSA Kędzierzyn-Koźle	26–24	25–22	18–25	19–25	15–12	103–108	Report
12 Dec	19:00	Olympiacos Piraeus (Greece)	1–3	(Turkey) Ziraat Bank Ankara	18–25	25–20	20–25	22–25		85–95	Report
13 Dec	20:30	Knack Roeselare (Belgium)	2–3	(Poland) ZAKSA Kędzierzyn-Koźle	20–25	25–21	25–23	22–25	10–15	102–109	Report
19 Dec	18:00	ZAKSA Kędzierzyn-Koźle (Poland)	0–3	(Turkey) Ziraat Bank Ankara	21–25	17–25	21–25			59–75	Report
20 Dec	20:30	Knack Roeselare (Belgium)	0–3	(Greece) Olympiacos Piraeus	25–27	21–25	12–25			58–77	Report
10 Jan	17:00	Ziraat Bank Ankara (Turkey)	3–2	(Belgium) Knack Roeselare	19–25	25–21	13–25	25–20	18–16	100–107	Report
11 Jan	19:30	Olympiacos Piraeus (Greece)	3–0	(Poland) ZAKSA Kędzierzyn-Koźle	25–18	25–19	25–22			75–59	Report
17 Jan	20:00	Ziraat Bank Ankara (Turkey)	3–0	(Greece) Olympiacos Piraeus	25–22	25–17	25–18			75–57	Report
17 Jan	20:30	ZAKSA Kędzierzyn-Koźle (Poland)	3–2	(Belgium) Knack Roeselare	22–25	19–25	27–25	25–16	15–12	108–103	Report

=== Pool B ===
Pos	Team	Pld	W	L	Pts	SW	SL	SR	SPW	SPL	SPR	Qualification
1	(Italy) Itas Trentino	6	5	1	16	17	5	3.400	531	464	1.144	Quarterfinals
2	(France) Tours VB	6	4	2	12	13	8	1.625	493	482	1.023	Playoffs
3	(Poland) Asseco Resovia	6	3	3	8	10	11	0.909	476	467	1.019	2023–24 CEV Cup
4	(Slovenia) ACH Volley Ljubljana	6	0	6	0	2	18	0.111	413	500	0.826	

Source: CEV

Date	Time		Score		Set 1	Set 2	Set 3	Set 4	Set 5	Total	Report
23 Nov	18:00	Asseco Resovia (Poland)	1–3	(France) Tours VB	22–25	23–25	25–21	21–25		91–96	Report
23 Nov	20:30	Itas Trentino (Italy)	3–1	(Slovenia) ACH Volley Ljubljana	25–15	20–25	25–18	26–24		96–82	Report
29 Nov	18:00	ACH Volley Ljubljana (Slovenia)	0–3	(Poland) Asseco Resovia	21–25	23–25	21–25			65–75	Report
29 Nov	20:00	Tours VB (France)	1–3	(Italy) Itas Trentino	17–25	22–25	25–23	19–25		83–98	Report
13 Dec	18:00	Asseco Resovia (Poland)	0–3	(Italy) Itas Trentino	21–25	24–26	20–25			65–76	Report
13 Dec	18:00	ACH Volley Ljubljana (Slovenia)	1–3	(France) Tours VB	25–22	23–25	23–25	18–25		89–97	Report
21 Dec	18:00	Asseco Resovia (Poland)	3–0	(Slovenia) ACH Volley Ljubljana	25–16	25–16	25–19			75–51	Report
21 Dec	20:00	Itas Trentino (Italy)	3–0	(France) Tours VB	27–25	25–22	25–18			77–65	Report
9 Jan	20:30	Tours VB (France)	3–0	(Poland) Asseco Resovia	25–22	25–18	27–25			77–65	Report
10 Jan	18:00	ACH Volley Ljubljana (Slovenia)	0–3	(Italy) Itas Trentino	30–32	16–25	18–25			64–82	Report
17 Jan	20:00	Tours VB (France)	3–0	(Slovenia) ACH Volley Ljubljana	25–21	25–19	25–22			75–62	Report
17 Jan	20:30	Itas Trentino (Italy)	2–3	(Poland) Asseco Resovia	25–20	23–25	20–25	25–20	9–15	102–105	Report

=== Pool C ===
Pos	Team	Pld	W	L	Pts	SW	SL	SR	SPW	SPL	SPR	Qualification
1	(Italy) Gas Sales Daiko Piacenza	6	5	1	15	16	5	3.200	510	468	1.090	Quarterfinals
2	(Turkey) Halkbank Ankara	6	4	2	10	12	11	1.091	506	499	1.014	Playoffs
3	(Germany) Berlin Recycling Volleys	6	3	3	10	12	10	1.200	504	504	1.000	Playoffs
4	(Portugal) Sport Lisboa e Benfica	6	0	6	1	4	18	0.222	483	532	0.908	

Source: CEV

Date	Time		Score		Set 1	Set 2	Set 3	Set 4	Set 5	Total	Report
22 Nov	20:00	Gas Sales Daiko Piacenza (Italy)	1–3	(Turkey) Halkbank Ankara	19–25	18–25	25–19	21–25		83–94	Report
23 Nov	19:30	Berlin Recycling Volleys (Germany)	3–0	(Portugal) Sport Lisboa e Benfica	27–25	25–19	25–21			77–65	Report
29 Nov	17:00	Halkbank Ankara (Turkey)	3–2	(Germany) Berlin Recycling Volleys	19–25	25–21	19–25	29–27	15–10	107–108	Report
30 Nov	20:30	Sport Lisboa e Benfica (Portugal)	1–3	(Italy) Gas Sales Daiko Piacenza	21–25	23–25	25–22	23–25		92–97	Report
13 Dec	20:30	Gas Sales Daiko Piacenza (Italy)	3–1	(Germany) Berlin Recycling Volleys	25–23	25–22	22–25	25–19		97–89	Report
14 Dec	18:00	Halkbank Ankara (Turkey)	3–0	(Portugal) Sport Lisboa e Benfica	25–17	25–23	25–16			75–56	Report
20 Dec	19:30	Berlin Recycling Volleys (Germany)	3–0	(Turkey) Halkbank Ankara	25–22	25–23	25–22			75–67	Report
20 Dec	20:30	Gas Sales Daiko Piacenza (Italy)	3–0	(Portugal) Sport Lisboa e Benfica	30–28	25–21	28–26			83–75	Report
10 Jan	18:00	Sport Lisboa e Benfica (Portugal)	1–3	(Germany) Berlin Recycling Volleys	22–25	22–25	25–22	24–26		93–98	Report
10 Jan	20:00	Halkbank Ankara (Turkey)	0–3	(Italy) Gas Sales Daiko Piacenza	19–25	23–25	19–25			61–75	Report
17 Jan	19:00	Sport Lisboa e Benfica (Portugal)	2–3	(Turkey) Halkbank Ankara	21–25	25–19	25–18	18–25	13–15	102–102	Report
17 Jan	19:30	Berlin Recycling Volleys (Germany)	0–3	(Italy) Gas Sales Daiko Piacenza	15–25	23–25	19–25			57–75	Report

=== Pool D ===
Pos	Team	Pld	W	L	Pts	SW	SL	SR	SPW	SPL	SPR	Qualification
1	(Poland) Jastrzębski Węgiel	6	5	1	15	16	5	3.200	517	436	1.186	Quarterfinals
2	(Spain) Guaguas Las Palmas	6	3	3	10	12	11	1.091	532	502	1.060	Playoffs
3	(Germany) SVG Lüneburg	6	2	4	6	7	13	0.538	413	470	0.879	2023–24 CEV Cup
4	(Czech Republic) Jihostroj České Budějovice	6	2	4	5	8	14	0.571	465	519	0.896	

Source: CEV

Date	Time		Score		Set 1	Set 2	Set 3	Set 4	Set 5	Total	Report
22 Nov	19:00	SVG Lüneburg (Germany)	3–0	(Czech Republic) Jihostroj České Budějovice	26–24	25–20	25–15			76–59	Report
22 Nov	20:30	Jastrzębski Węgiel (Poland)	3–0	(Spain) Guaguas Las Palmas	30–28	25–16	26–24			81–68	Report
28 Nov	17:10	Jihostroj České Budějovice (Czech Republic)	0–3	(Poland) Jastrzębski Węgiel	19–25	27–29	26–28			72–82	Report
29 Nov	19:30	Guaguas Las Palmas (Spain)	1–3	(Germany) SVG Lüneburg	20–25	23–25	25–21	20–25		88–96	Report
13 Dec	19:00	SVG Lüneburg (Germany)	1–3	(Poland) Jastrzębski Węgiel	25–23	21–25	15–25	13–25		74–98	Report
13 Dec	19:30	Guaguas Las Palmas (Spain)	3–1	(Czech Republic) Jihostroj České Budějovice	25–17	24–26	25–16	25–21		99–80	Report
20 Dec	18:00	Jastrzębski Węgiel (Poland)	3–1	(Czech Republic) Jihostroj České Budějovice	21–25	25–17	25–17	25–17		96–76	Report
20 Dec	19:00	SVG Lüneburg (Germany)	0–3	(Spain) Guaguas Las Palmas	20–25	21–25	16–25			57–75	Report
9 Jan	17:10	Jihostroj České Budějovice (Czech Republic)	3–0	(Germany) SVG Lüneburg	25–16	25–19	25–23			75–58	Report
11 Jan	20:00	Guaguas Las Palmas (Spain)	3–1	(Poland) Jastrzębski Węgiel	25–23	19–25	25–22	25–15		94–85	Report
17 Jan	17:10	Jihostroj České Budějovice (Czech Republic)	3–2	(Spain) Guaguas Las Palmas	25–23	18–25	20–25	25–23	15–12	103–108	Report
17 Jan	18:00	Jastrzębski Węgiel (Poland)	3–0	(Germany) SVG Lüneburg	25–17	25–16	25–19			75–52	Report

=== Pool E ===
Pos	Team	Pld	W	L	Pts	SW	SL	SR	SPW	SPL	SPR	Qualification
1	(Italy) Cucine Lube Civitanova	6	5	1	16	17	3	5.667	481	412	1.167	Quarterfinals
2	(Czech Republic) Lvi Praha	6	3	3	10	11	10	1.100	473	464	1.019	Playoffs
3	(Belgium) Greenyard Maaseik	6	2	4	6	7	14	0.500	465	496	0.938	2023–24 CEV Cup
4	(Romania) CS Arcada Galați	6	2	4	4	8	16	0.500	499	546	0.914	

Source: CEV

Date	Time		Score		Set 1	Set 2	Set 3	Set 4	Set 5	Total	Report
22 Nov	20:30	Cucine Lube Civitanova (Italy)	3–0	(Romania) CS Arcada Galați	25–17	25–19	25–23			75–59	Report
22 Nov	20:30	Greenyard Maaseik (Belgium)	0–3	(Czech Republic) Lvi Praha	22–25	24–26	22–25			68–76	Report
29 Nov	18:00	CS Arcada Galați (Romania)	1–3	(Belgium) Greenyard Maaseik	20–25	25–23	17–25	23–25		85–98	Report
30 Nov	18:00	Lvi Praha (Czech Republic)	0–3	(Italy) Cucine Lube Civitanova	22–25	17–25	23–25			62–75	Report
12 Dec	20:30	Greenyard Maaseik (Belgium)	0–3	(Italy) Cucine Lube Civitanova	22–25	25–27	24–26			71–78	Report
14 Dec	18:00	CS Arcada Galați (Romania)	3–2	(Czech Republic) Lvi Praha	25–15	23–25	19–25	25–21	15–11	107–97	Report
21 Dec	20:30	Cucine Lube Civitanova (Italy)	3–0	(Czech Republic) Lvi Praha	25–20	25–23	25–23			75–66	Report
21 Dec	20:30	Greenyard Maaseik (Belgium)	3–1	(Romania) CS Arcada Galați	25–23	23–25	25–23	25–14		98–85	Report
9 Jan	18:00	CS Arcada Galați (Romania)	3–2	(Italy) Cucine Lube Civitanova	21–25	25–23	25–20	16–25	15–10	102–103	Report
11 Jan	18:00	Lvi Praha (Czech Republic)	3–1	(Belgium) Greenyard Maaseik	22–25	25–17	25–23	25–13		97–78	Report
17 Jan	19:30	Lvi Praha (Czech Republic)	3–0	(Romania) CS Arcada Galați	25–23	25–23	25–15			75–61	Report
17 Jan	20:30	Cucine Lube Civitanova (Italy)	3–0	(Belgium) Greenyard Maaseik	25–18	25–15	25–19			75–52	Report

=== First place ranking ===
Pos	Pool	Team	Pld	W	L	Pts	SW	SL	SR	SPW	SPL	SPR	Qualification
1	A	(Turkey) Ziraat Bank Ankara	6	6	0	16	18	6	3.000	544	508	1.071	Quarterfinals
2	E	(Italy) Cucine Lube Civitanova	6	5	1	16	17	3	5.667	481	412	1.167	Quarterfinals
3	B	(Italy) Itas Trentino	6	5	1	16	17	5	3.400	531	464	1.144	Quarterfinals
4	D	(Poland) Jastrzębski Węgiel	6	5	1	15	16	5	3.200	517	436	1.186	Quarterfinals
5	C	(Italy) Gas Sales Daiko Piacenza	6	5	1	15	16	5	3.200	510	468	1.090	Quarterfinals

Source: CEV

=== Second place ranking ===
Pos	Pool	Team	Pld	W	L	Pts	SW	SL	SR	SPW	SPL	SPR	Qualification
1	B	(France) Tours VB	6	4	2	12	13	8	1.625	493	482	1.023	Playoffs
2	C	(Turkey) Halkbank Ankara	6	4	2	10	12	11	1.091	506	499	1.014	Playoffs
3	E	(Czech Republic) Lvi Praha	6	3	3	10	11	10	1.100	473	464	1.019	Playoffs
4	D	(Spain) Guaguas Las Palmas	6	3	3	10	12	11	1.091	532	502	1.060	Playoffs
5	A	(Poland) ZAKSA Kędzierzyn-Koźle	6	3	3	8	11	14	0.786	550	558	0.986	Playoffs

Source: CEV

=== Third place ranking ===
Pos	Pool	Team	Pld	W	L	Pts	SW	SL	SR	SPW	SPL	SPR	Qualification
1	C	(Germany) Berlin Recycling Volleys	6	3	3	10	12	10	1.200	504	504	1.000	Playoffs
2	B	(Poland) Asseco Resovia	6	3	3	8	10	11	0.909	476	467	1.019	2023–24 CEV Cup
3	A	(Greece) Olympiacos Piraeus	6	2	4	6	8	12	0.667	452	469	0.964	2023–24 CEV Cup
4	D	(Germany) SVG Lüneburg	6	2	4	6	7	13	0.538	413	470	0.879	2023–24 CEV Cup
5	E	(Belgium) Greenyard Maaseik	6	2	4	6	7	14	0.500	465	496	0.938	2023–24 CEV Cup

Source: CEV

== Bracket ==
Playoff 6
(Germany) BR Volleys	3	3
(France) Tours VB	1	0
(Poland) ZAKSA	3	0
(Turkey) Halkbank Ankara	2	3
(Spain) Las Palmas	3	1	15
(Czech Republic) Lvi Praha	0	3	8

Quarterfinals
(Germany) BR Volleys	0	0
(Italy) Itas Trentino	3	3
(Turkey) Halkbank Ankara	1	1
(Italy) Lube	3	3
(Italy) Piacenza	3	0
(Poland) Jastrzębski Węgiel	2	3
(Spain) Las Palmas	1	3	7
(Turkey) Ziraat Bank Ankara	3	0	15

Semifinals
(Italy) Itas Trentino	3	2
(Italy) Lube	1	3
(Poland) Jastrzębski Węgiel	3	3
(Turkey) Ziraat Bank Ankara	0	2

Final
(Italy) Itas Trentino	3
(Poland) Jastrzębski Węgiel	0

== Playoff 6 ==
- The winners of the ties qualify for the quarterfinals.
- Aggregate score is counted as follows: 3 points for 3–0 or 3–1 win, 2 points for 3–2 win, 1 point for 2–3 loss.
- In case the teams are tied after two legs, a Golden Set is played immediately at the completion of the second leg.
- All times are local.

Team 1	Agg.	Team 2	1st leg	2nd leg	Golden Set
Berlin Recycling Volleys (Germany)	6–0	(France) Tours VB	3–1	3–0	
ZAKSA Kędzierzyn-Koźle (Poland)	2–4	(Turkey) Halkbank Ankara	3–2	0–3	
Guaguas Las Palmas (Spain)	3–3	(Czech Republic) Lvi Praha	3–0	1–3	15–8

=== First leg ===
Date	Time		Score		Set 1	Set 2	Set 3	Set 4	Set 5	Total	Report
31 Jan	19:30	Berlin Recycling Volleys (Germany)	3–1	(France) Tours VB	25–17	20–25	25–13	25–22		95–77	Report
31 Jan	20:30	ZAKSA Kędzierzyn-Koźle (Poland)	3–2	(Turkey) Halkbank Ankara	21–25	25–22	25–21	16–25	15–12	102–105	Report
30 Jan	18:30	Guaguas Las Palmas (Spain)	3–0	(Czech Republic) Lvi Praha	25–23	25–23	26–24			76–70	Report

=== Second leg ===
Date	Time		Score		Set 1	Set 2	Set 3	Set 4	Set 5	Total	Report
8 Feb	20:00	Tours VB (France)	0–3	(Germany) Berlin Recycling Volleys	22–25	18–25	22–25			62–75	Report
7 Feb	18:00	Halkbank Ankara (Turkey)	3–0	(Poland) ZAKSA Kędzierzyn-Koźle	32–30	25–21	25–22			82–73	Report
7 Feb	19:30	Lvi Praha (Czech Republic)	3–1	(Spain) Guaguas Las Palmas	25–21	25–21	22–25	25–22		97–89	Report
Golden set		Lvi Praha (Czech Republic)	8–15	(Spain) Guaguas Las Palmas							

== Quarterfinals ==
- The winners of the ties qualify for the semifinals.
- Aggregate score is counted as follows: 3 points for 3–0 or 3–1 win, 2 points for 3–2 win, 1 point for 2–3 loss.
- In case the teams are tied after two legs, a Golden Set is played immediately at the completion of the second leg.
- All times are local.

Team 1	Agg.	Team 2	1st leg	2nd leg	Golden Set
Berlin Recycling Volleys (Germany)	0–6	(Italy) Itas Trentino	0–3	0–3	
Halkbank Ankara (Turkey)	0–6	(Italy) Cucine Lube Civitanova	1–3	1–3	
Gas Sales Daiko Piacenza (Italy)	2–4	(Poland) Jastrzębski Węgiel	3–2	0–3	
Guaguas Las Palmas (Spain)	3–3	(Turkey) Ziraat Bank Ankara	1–3	3–0	7–15

=== First leg ===
Date	Time		Score		Set 1	Set 2	Set 3	Set 4	Set 5	Total	Report
21 Feb	19:30	Berlin Recycling Volleys (Germany)	0–3	(Italy) Itas Trentino	18–25	17–25	17–25			52–75	Report
21 Feb	18:00	Halkbank Ankara (Turkey)	1–3	(Italy) Cucine Lube Civitanova	21–25	21–25	27–25	22–25		91–100	Report
21 Feb	20:30	Gas Sales Daiko Piacenza (Italy)	3–2	(Poland) Jastrzębski Węgiel	19–25	30–28	25–16	22–25	15–11	111–105	Report
22 Feb	18:30	Guaguas Las Palmas (Spain)	1–3	(Turkey) Ziraat Bank Ankara	25–17	23–25	21–25	23–25		92–92	Report

=== Second leg ===
Date	Time		Score		Set 1	Set 2	Set 3	Set 4	Set 5	Total	Report
29 Feb	20:30	Itas Trentino (Italy)	3–0	(Germany) Berlin Recycling Volleys	25–19	25–20	25–22			75–61	Report
28 Feb	20:30	Cucine Lube Civitanova (Italy)	3–1	(Turkey) Halkbank Ankara	25–23	20–25	25–15	25–23		95–86	Report
28 Feb	18:00	Jastrzębski Węgiel (Poland)	3–0	(Italy) Gas Sales Daiko Piacenza	25–22	26–24	25–21			76–67	Report
28 Feb	19:00	Ziraat Bank Ankara (Turkey)	0–3	(Spain) Guaguas Las Palmas	17–25	21–25	18–25			56–75	Report
Golden set		Ziraat Bank Ankara (Turkey)	15–7	(Spain) Guaguas Las Palmas							

== Semifinals ==
- The winners of the ties qualify for the final.
- Aggregate score is counted as follows: 3 points for 3–0 or 3–1 win, 2 points for 3–2 win, 1 point for 2–3 loss.
- In case the teams are tied after two legs, a Golden Set is played immediately at the completion of the second leg.
- All times are local.

Team 1	Agg.	Team 2	1st leg	2nd leg
Itas Trentino (Italy)	4–2	(Italy) Cucine Lube Civitanova	3–1	2–3
Jastrzębski Węgiel (Poland)	5–1	(Turkey) Ziraat Bank Ankara	3–0	3–2

=== First leg ===
Date	Time		Score		Set 1	Set 2	Set 3	Set 4	Set 5	Total	Report
13 Mar	20:30	Itas Trentino (Italy)	3–1	(Italy) Cucine Lube Civitanova	25–17	16–25	25–18	25–23		91–83	Report
13 Mar	20:30	Jastrzębski Węgiel (Poland)	3–0	(Turkey) Ziraat Bank Ankara	25–13	25–18	30–28			80–59	Report

=== Second leg ===
Date	Time		Score		Set 1	Set 2	Set 3	Set 4	Set 5	Total	Report
21 Mar	20:30	Cucine Lube Civitanova (Italy)	3–2	(Italy) Itas Trentino	26–24	20–25	22–25	25–18	15–9	108–101	Report
20 Mar	19:00	Ziraat Bank Ankara (Turkey)	2–3	(Poland) Jastrzębski Węgiel	32–34	25–27	25–16	25–21	7–15	114–113	Report

== Final ==
- Place: Antalya
- Time: Turkey Time (UTC+03:00).

Date	Time		Score		Set 1	Set 2	Set 3	Set 4	Set 5	Total	Report
5 May	17:00	Itas Trentino (Italy)	3–0	(Poland) Jastrzębski Węgiel	25–20	25–22	25–21			75–63	Report

== Final standings ==
Qualified for the 2024 FIVB Club World Championship

Rank	Team
1st place, gold medalist(s)	(Italy) Itas Trentino
2nd place, silver medalist(s)	(Poland) Jastrzębski Węgiel
Semifinalists	(Italy) Cucine Lube Civitanova (Turkey) Ziraat Bank Ankara

2023–24 CEV Champions League winners
(Italy)
Itas Trentino
4th title
