= VK Karlovarsko =

French volleyball club

VK ČEZ Karlovarsko
- Full name: Volejbalový Klub ČEZ Karlovarsko
- Founded: 2014
- Ground: Hala míčových sportů
- Chairman: Jakub Novotný
- Manager: Liam Sketcher
- League: Extraliga
- 2022–23: 3rd place
- Website: Club home page

Volejbalový Klub ČEZ Karlovarsko or simply VK ČEZ Karlovarsko, is a professional men's volleyball club located in Karlovy Vary that competes in Extraliga, the top flight of Czech volleyball and CEV Champions League at the international level.

The club was founded in 2014 and made its debut in the Czech Extraliga the same year. Despite the club's short history they have won 3 national titles and 2 SuperCups in less than 10 years.

== Honours ==
- Czech Championship

Winners (3): 2017–18, 2020–21, 2021–22

- Czech SuperCup

Winners (2): 2021–22, 2022–23

== Team ==
As of 2022–23 season

| No. | Name | Date of birth | Position |
|---|---|---|---|
| 1 | (Australia) James Weir | 20 July 1995 (age 29) | middle blocker |
| 3 | (Czech Republic) Daniel Pfeffer | 27 April 1990 (age 34) | libero |
| 4 | (Slovakia) Patrik Lamanec | 28 December 1995 (age 29) | opposite |
| 5 | (Czech Republic) Adam Zajíček | 25 February 1993 (age 32) | middle blocker |
| 6 | (Estonia) Martti Juhkami | 6 June 1988 (age 36) | outside hitter |
| 8 | (Netherlands) Wessel Keemink | 29 May 1993 (age 31) | setter |
| 9 | (Poland) Kewin Sasak | 17 September 1997 (age 27) | opposite |
| 11 | (Czech Republic) Jan Kasan | 11 April 1998 (age 26) | setter |
| 12 | (Czech Republic) Matěj Pastrňák | 25 November 2005 (age 19) | outside hitter |
| 13 | (Poland) Łukasz Wiese | 24 March 1993 (age 32) | outside hitter |
| 14 | (Czech Republic) Vojtěch Patočka | 2 March 1993 (age 32) | middle blocker |
| 15 | (Slovakia) Jakub Ihnát | 22 October 1996 (age 28) | outside hitter |
| 21 | (Czech Republic) Martin Kočka | 28 May 1998 (age 26) | libero |
| Head coach: | | (Czech Republic) Jiří Novák | |
