= Martin Stoev =

Bulgarian volleyball player and coach

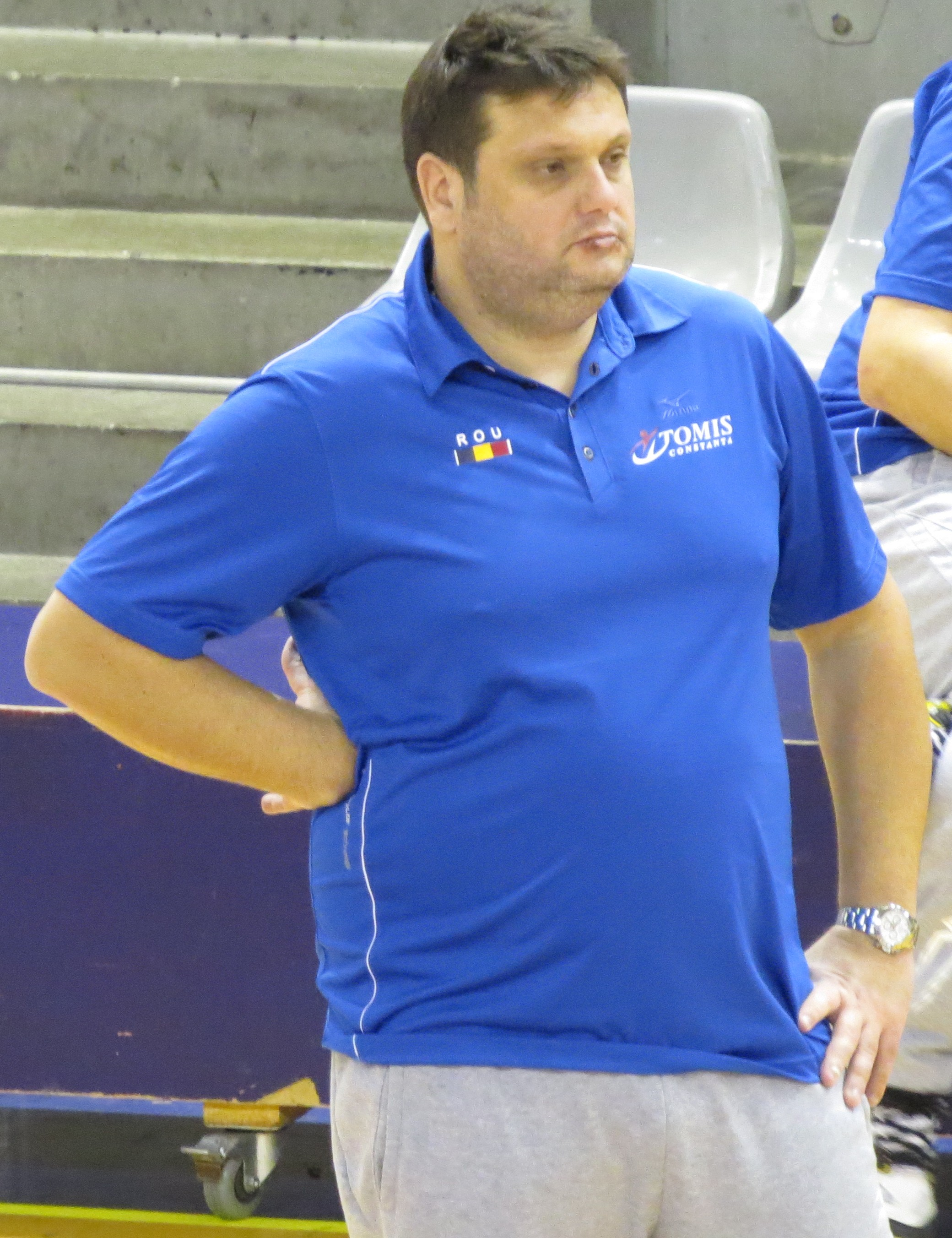
Martin Stoev in 2014

Martin Stoyanov Stoev (Bulgarian: Мартин Стоянов Стоев; born 3 December 1971 in Sofia) is a Bulgarian volleyball coach and former player. He currently is head coach of the Romanian team CVM Tomis Constanța.

He played volleyball from 1984 until 2005, with over 200 caps with the Bulgarian national team. He was a 3 time National champion of Bulgaria (twice with the team of Levski Siconco, one with Minior Buhovo).

From 2005 to 2008 he was the head coach of the Bulgaria men's national volleyball team, finishing 3 consecutive times in top 5 of the World League.
