= Kladno volejbal cz =

Czech volleyball club

- Full name: Kladno volejbal cz, z.s.
- Founded: 2004
- Ground: Kladenská sportovní hala
- Chairman: Milan Fortuník
- Manager: Milan Fortuník
- League: Extraliga
- Website: Club home page

Kladno volejbal cz is a Czech professional volleyball club based in Kladno.

== History ==
The club was founded in 1953 under the name Aero Odolena Voda in the town of Odolena Voda. In the 1970s and 1980s, Aero Odolena Voda became one of the leading teams in Czechoslovak volleyball, winning the national league three times in 1978, 1987 and 1988. In European competition, the club won the CEV Cup Winners' Cup in 1978. In 2001 the club was renamed to Chance Odolena Voda. In 2004 it moved to the city of Kladno and was renamed VK Kladno.

In 2007, the Aero Odolena Voda club was re-established in Odolena Voda (cz:Aero Odolena Voda).

== Honours ==
- Czech Championship

Winners (2): 2004–05, 2009–10

- Czech Cup

Winners (1): 2016–17
