= VK Dukla Liberec =

Czech volleyball club

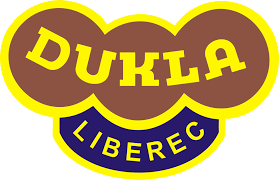
- Full name: Volejbalový Klub Dukla Liberec
- Founded: 1948
- Ground: SH Dukla Liberec
- Chairman: Pavel Šimoníček
- Manager: Martin Démar
- League: Extraliga
- 2021–22: 5th place
- Website: Club home page

VK Dukla Liberec (Czech: Volejbalový Klub Dukla Liberec) is a Czech volleyball club based in Liberec.

The club was born in 1948 in Prague, and in its history changed its headquarters several times: in 1957 it moved from the Czechoslovak capital to the town of Kolín, in 1966 to Jihlava, and finally in 1969 settled permanently in Liberec.

The words Dukla is the amount of Czech CSKA, in fact represented the formation, in the years of Soviet control, the army of Czechoslovakia. Several athletes formed in the club became professional soldiers. Currently, after the reform of the army of the Czech Republic, the team is no longer made up of soldiers.

Dukla boasts the victory of 17 championships and nine national Cups, but the most important result is the CEV European Champions Cup won in 1976. The final result of continental importance is the third place in the 2005 edition of the CEV Cup.

== Honours ==
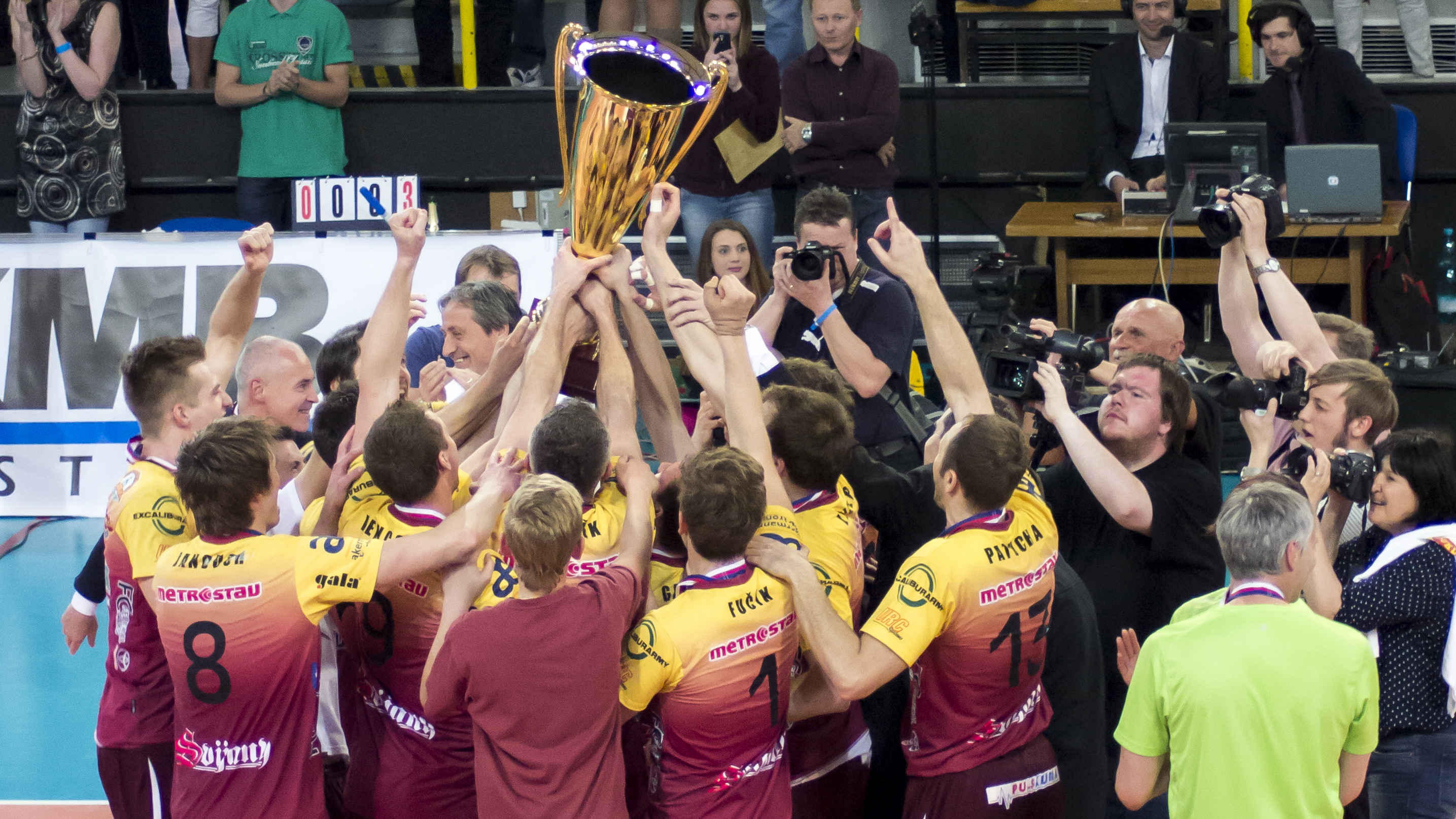
Dukla players celebrating the 2015 Czech Championship

=== Domestic ===
- Czech Championship

Winners (4): 2000–01, 2002–03, 2014–15, 2015–16

- Czech Cup

Winners (10): 1994–95, 2000–01, 2006–07, 2007–08, 2008–09, 2012–13, 2013–14, 2015–16, 2017–18, 2020–21

- Czechoslovak Championship

Winners (14): 1949–50, 1950–51, 1951–52, 1952–53, 1953–54, 1954–55, 1959–60, 1960–61, 1962–63, 1972–73, 1974–75, 1975–76, 1979–80, 1982–83

- Czechoslovak Cup

Winners (2): 1974–75, 1991–92

=== International ===
- CEV European Champions Cup

Winners (1): 1975–76

== Former names ==
Years	Name
1948–1952	ATK Praha
1953–1955	ÚDA Praha
1955–1957	Dukla Praha
1957–1966	Dukla Kolín
1966–1969	Dukla Jihlava
1969–present	VK Dukla Liberec
