= VK České Budějovice =

Czech volleyball club

VK Jihostroj České Budějovice
- Full name: Volejbalový Klub Jihostroj České Budějovice
- Founded: 1944
- Ground: SH České Budějovice
- Chairman: Jan Diviš
- Manager: Zdeněk Šmejkal
- League: Extraliga
- 2023–24: Champions
- Website: Club home page

VK Jihostroj České Budějovice is a professional men's volleyball club based in České Budějovice, which competes in the Czech Extraliga.

The club was founded in 1944 as Škoda České Budějovice. In 1995, the activities of all men's volleyball teams in TJ Škoda České Budějovice. Since the 1996-97 season, it has been one of the top Czech volleyball teams. The men's team moved on a fully professional basis and the biggest sponsor became Jihostroj a.s. Velešín.

Jihostroj České Budějovice is the most successful Czech volleyball team of the modern era. Since 2000, club has won Czech extraliga eleven times and the Czech Cup seven times.

== Honours ==
- Czech Championship

Winners (11): 1999–2000, 2001–02, 2006–07, 2007–08, 2008–09, 2010–11, 2011–12, 2013–14, 2016–17, 2018–19, 2023–24

- Czech Cup

Winners (8): 1998–99, 1999–2000, 2001–02, 2002–03, 2010–11, 2018–19, 2019–20, 2021–22
