= 2014 FIVB Men's Volleyball World Championship qualification (NORCECA) =

The NORCECA qualification for the 2014 FIVB Men's Volleyball World Championship saw member nations compete for five places at the finals in Poland.

== Draw ==
39 of the 41 NORCECA national teams entered qualification. The teams were distributed according to their position in the NORCECA Senior Men's Confederation Rankings as of 15 January 2012 using the serpentine system for their distribution. (Rankings shown in brackets) Teams ranked 1–6 do not compete in the first and second rounds, and automatically qualify for the third round.

First round (AFECAVOL)

Pool G	Pool H
Panama (7); El Salvador (16); Honduras (20); Turks and Caicos Islands (—)	Costa Rica (9); Guatemala (13); Nicaragua (23); Belize (25)

First round (CAZOVA)

Pool A	Pool C	Pool E
Bahamas (8); Jamaica (17); Curaçao (19); Martinique (—)	Dominican Republic (10); U.S. Virgin Islands (15); Haiti (28); Guadeloupe (31)	Barbados (12); Suriname (14); Aruba (29); Cayman Islands (30)

First round (ECVA)

Pool B	Pool D	Pool F
Saint Lucia (11); Grenada (26); Saint Vincent and the Grenadines (27); Sint Eustatius (—)	Antigua and Barbuda (18); Anguilla (24); Bermuda (32); Saint Martin (—); Sint Maarten (—)	Dominica (21); Saint Kitts and Nevis (22); British Virgin Islands (33); Montserrat (34)

Second round

Pool I	Pool J	Pool K
1st Pool A 2nd Pool D 2nd Pool E 3rd Pool H	1st Pool B 2nd Pool C 2nd Pool F 3rd Pool G	1st Pool C 2nd Pool B 2nd Pool G 3rd Pool F
Pool L	Pool M	Pool N
1st Pool D 2nd Pool A 2nd Pool H 3rd Pool E	1st Pool E 1st Pool H 3rd Pool A 3rd Pool D	1st Pool F 1st Pool G 3rd Pool B 3rd Pool C

Third round

The sixteen remaining teams were distributed according to their position in second round and then in the NORCECA Senior Men's Confederation Rankings as of January 2014 using the serpentine system for their distribution. (Positions in second round and NORCECA rankings shown in brackets)

Pool O	Pool P	Pool Q	Pool R
United States (Seeded – 1); Guatemala (1st – 9); Saint Lucia (1st – 10); Haiti (2nd – 24)	Cuba (Seeded – 2); Dominican Republic (1st – 6); Barbados (1st – 12); Suriname (2nd – 23)	Canada (Seeded – 3); Trinidad and Tobago (Seeded – 8); Costa Rica (1st – 13); Panama (2nd – 11)	Mexico (Seeded – 4); Puerto Rico (Seeded – 5); Honduras (1st – 17); Bahamas (2nd – 7)

Final round

2nd Pool O
2nd Pool P
2nd Pool Q
2nd Pool R

== First round ==
=== Pool A ===
- Venue: International School Auditorium, Willemstad, Curaçao
- Dates: December 1–2, 2012
- All times are Atlantic Standard Time (UTC−04:00)

==== Preliminary round ====
Pos	Team	Pld	W	L	Pts	SPW	SPL	SPR	SW	SL	SR
1	Bahamas	3	3	0	14	258	200	1.290	9	1	9.000
2	Curaçao	3	2	1	9	271	263	1.030	7	5	1.400
3	Jamaica	3	1	2	4	208	230	0.904	3	7	0.429
4	Martinique	3	0	3	3	235	279	0.842	3	9	0.333

Date	Time		Score		Set 1	Set 2	Set 3	Set 4	Set 5	Total	Report
01 Dec	09:00	Jamaica	0–3	Bahamas	15–25	14–25	26–28			55–78	P2 P3
01 Dec	11:00	Curaçao	3–2	Martinique	25–18	25–20	23–25	20–25	15–13	108–101	P2 P3
01 Dec	18:00	Jamaica	3–1	Martinique	19–25	25–16	25–20	25–16		94–77	P2 P3
01 Dec	20:00	Curaçao	1–3	Bahamas	27–25	18–25	26–28	17–25		88–103	P2 P3
02 Dec	09:00	Bahamas	3–0	Martinique	25–16	27–25	25–16			77–57	P2 P3
02 Dec	11:00	Curaçao	3–0	Jamaica	25–15	25–22	25–22			75–59	P2 P3

==== Final round ====
===== 3rd place =====
Date	Time		Score		Set 1	Set 2	Set 3	Set 4	Set 5	Total	Report
02 Dec	18:00	Martinique	3–0	Jamaica	25–18	25–20	25–18			75–56	P2 P3

===== Final =====
Date	Time		Score		Set 1	Set 2	Set 3	Set 4	Set 5	Total	Report
02 Dec	20:00	Bahamas	3–1	Curaçao	22–25	25–20	25–21	25–21		97–87	P2 P3

==== Final standing ====
Rank	Team
1	Bahamas
2	Curaçao
3	Martinique
4	Jamaica

=== Pool B ===
- Venue: Beausejour Indoor Stadium, Gros Islet, Saint Lucia
- Dates: April 27–29, 2012
- All times are Atlantic Standard Time (UTC−04:00)

==== Preliminary round ====
Pos	Team	Pld	W	L	Pts	SPW	SPL	SPR	SW	SL	SR
1	Saint Lucia	3	3	0	15	225	118	1.907	9	0	MAX
2	St. Vincent & Grenadines	3	2	1	9	216	198	1.091	6	4	1.500
3	Grenada	3	1	2	6	204	222	0.919	4	6	0.667
4	Sint Eustatius	3	0	3	0	118	225	0.524	0	9	0.000

Date	Time		Score		Set 1	Set 2	Set 3	Set 4	Set 5	Total	Report
27 Apr	09:00	Grenada	1–3	St. Vincent & Grenadines	25–23	22–25	19–25	12–25		78–98	P2 P3
27 Apr	10:30	Saint Lucia	3–0	Sint Eustatius	25–9	25–6	25–9			75–24	P2 P3
27 Apr	18:30	Grenada	3–0	Sint Eustatius	25–21	25–13	25–15			75–49	P2 P3
27 Apr	20:00	Saint Lucia	3–0	St. Vincent & Grenadines	25–9	25–22	25–12			75–43	P2 P3
28 Apr	09:00	St. Vincent & Grenadines	3–0	Sint Eustatius	25–17	25–10	25–18			75–45	P2 P3
28 Apr	10:30	Saint Lucia	3–0	Grenada	25–22	25–10	25–19			75–51	P2 P3

==== Final round ====
===== Semifinals =====
Date	Time		Score		Set 1	Set 2	Set 3	Set 4	Set 5	Total	Report
28 Apr	18:30	St. Vincent & Grenadines	3–1	Grenada	27–25	20–25	25–22	25–18		97–90	P2 P3
28 Apr	20:00	Saint Lucia	3–0	Sint Eustatius	25–4	25–8	25–13			75–25	P2 P3

===== 3rd place =====
Date	Time		Score		Set 1	Set 2	Set 3	Set 4	Set 5	Total	Report
29 Apr	18:00	Grenada	3–0	Sint Eustatius	25–21	25–14	25–23			75–58	P2 P3

===== Final =====
Date	Time		Score		Set 1	Set 2	Set 3	Set 4	Set 5	Total	Report
29 Apr	19:30	St. Vincent & Grenadines	0–3	Saint Lucia	16–25	18–25	13–25			47–75	P2 P3

==== Final standing ====
Rank	Team
1	Saint Lucia
2	St. Vincent & Grenadines
3	Grenada
4	Sint Eustatius

=== Pool C ===
- Venue: Pabellón de Voleibol, Santo Domingo, Dominican Republic
- Dates: November 3–4, 2012
- All times are Atlantic Standard Time (UTC−04:00)

==== Preliminary round ====
Pos	Team	Pld	W	L	Pts	SPW	SPL	SPR	SW	SL	SR
1	Dominican Republic	3	3	0	15	225	114	1.974	9	0	MAX
2	Haiti	3	2	1	9	217	201	1.080	6	4	1.500
3	Guadeloupe	3	1	2	4	222	280	0.793	4	8	0.500
4	U.S. Virgin Islands	3	0	3	2	194	263	0.738	2	9	0.222

Date	Time		Score		Set 1	Set 2	Set 3	Set 4	Set 5	Total	Report
03 Nov	09:00	Dominican Republic	3–0	Guadeloupe	25–12	25–14	25–10			75–36	P2 P3
03 Nov	11:00	U.S. Virgin Islands	0–3	Haiti	23–25	17–25	13–25			53–75	P2 P3
03 Nov	18:00	U.S. Virgin Islands	2–3	Guadeloupe	25–19	17–25	32–34	25–20	11–15	110–113	P2 P3
03 Nov	20:00	Dominican Republic	3–0	Haiti	25–15	25–17	25–15			75–47	P2 P3
04 Nov	09:00	Haiti	3–1	Guadeloupe	25–15	20–25	25–18	25–15		95–73	P2 P3
04 Nov	11:00	Dominican Republic	3–0	U.S. Virgin Islands	25–9	25–12	25–10			75–31	P2 P3

==== Final round ====
===== 3rd place =====
Date	Time		Score		Set 1	Set 2	Set 3	Set 4	Set 5	Total	Report
04 Nov	18:00	Guadeloupe	3–0	U.S. Virgin Islands	25–23	25–10	25–20			75–53	P2 P3

===== Final =====
Date	Time		Score		Set 1	Set 2	Set 3	Set 4	Set 5	Total	Report
04 Nov	20:00	Dominican Republic	3–0	Haiti	25–14	25–16	25–21			75–51	P2 P3

==== Final standing ====
Rank	Team
1	Dominican Republic
2	Haiti
3	Guadeloupe
4	U.S. Virgin Islands

=== Pool D ===
- Venue: (Collectivity of Saint Martin) Omnisports Hall, Marigot, Saint Martin
- Dates: August 31 – September 2, 2012
- All times are Atlantic Standard Time (UTC−04:00)

Pos	Team	Pld	W	L	Pts	SPW	SPL	SPR	SW	SL	SR
1	Antigua and Barbuda	4	4	0	17	348	261	1.333	12	3	4.000
2	Saint Martin	4	3	1	13	355	351	1.011	10	6	1.667
3	Anguilla	4	1	3	9	381	284	1.342	8	10	0.800
4	Sint Maarten	4	1	3	7	342	367	0.932	6	10	0.600
5	Bermuda	4	1	3	4	298	361	0.825	4	11	0.364

Date	Time		Score		Set 1	Set 2	Set 3	Set 4	Set 5	Total	Report
31 Aug	09:00	Saint Martin	3–0	Bermuda	25–23	25–23	27–25			77–71	P2 P3
31 Aug	11:00	Sint Maarten	0–3	Antigua and Barbuda	21–25	26–28	15–25			62–78	P2 P3
31 Aug	18:00	Sint Maarten	1–3	Anguilla	25–18	23–25	17–25	21–25		86–93	P2 P3
31 Aug	20:00	Saint Martin	1–3	Antigua and Barbuda	16–25	25–21	17–25	16–25		74–96	P2 P3
01 Sep	09:00	Anguilla	2–3	Antigua and Barbuda	16–25	25–14	25–20	13–25	10–15	89–99	P2 P3
01 Sep	11:00	Sint Maarten	3–1	Bermuda	25–18	28–26	21–25	25–21		99–90	P2 P3
01 Sep	18:00	Bermuda	0–3	Antigua and Barbuda	11–25	11–25	14–25			36–75	P2 P3
01 Sep	20:00	Saint Martin	3–1	Anguilla	25–23	25–22	23–25	25–19		98–89	P2 P3
02 Sep	09:00	Bermuda	3–2	Anguilla	16–25	16–25	28–26	26–24	15–10	101–110	P2 P3
02 Sep	11:00	Saint Martin	3–2	Sint Maarten	25–16	20–25	25–17	21–25	15–12	106–95	P2 P3

=== Pool E ===
- Venue: Clifton Hunter High School Sports Center, Grand Cayman, Cayman Islands
- Dates: October 6–7, 2012
- All times are Eastern Standard Time (UTC−05:00)

==== Preliminary round ====
Pos	Team	Pld	W	L	Pts	SPW	SPL	SPR	SW	SL	SR
1	Barbados	3	3	0	14	246	180	1.367	9	1	9.000
2	Suriname	3	2	1	9	269	248	1.085	7	5	1.400
3	Aruba	3	1	2	5	257	278	0.924	5	8	0.625
4	Cayman Islands	3	0	3	2	199	265	0.751	2	9	0.222

Date	Time		Score		Set 1	Set 2	Set 3	Set 4	Set 5	Total	Report
06 Oct	09:00	Cayman Islands	0–3	Suriname	16–25	23–25	13–25			52–75	P2 P3
06 Oct	11:00	Aruba	0–3	Barbados	10–25	18–25	14–25			42–75	P2 P3
06 Oct	19:00	Suriname	1–3	Barbados	21–25	25–21	22–25	19–25		87–96	P2 P3
06 Oct	21:00	Cayman Islands	2–3	Aruba	17–25	25–17	25–23	18–25	10–15	95–105	P2 P3
07 Oct	09:00	Suriname	3–2	Aruba	25–19	25–22	22–25	20–25	15–9	107–100	P2 P3
07 Oct	11:00	Cayman Islands	0–3	Barbados	17–25	14–25	20–25			51–75	P2 P3

==== Final round ====
===== 3rd place =====
Date	Time		Score		Set 1	Set 2	Set 3	Set 4	Set 5	Total	Report
07 Oct	18:00	Aruba	3–2	Cayman Islands	21–25	25–20	11–25	25–16	15–13	97–99	P2 P3

===== Final =====
Date	Time		Score		Set 1	Set 2	Set 3	Set 4	Set 5	Total	Report
07 Oct	20:00	Suriname	3–2	Barbados	25–22	18–25	15–25	25–20	15–12	98–104	P2 P3

==== Final standing ====
Rank	Team
1	Suriname
2	Barbados
3	Aruba
4	Cayman Islands

=== Pool F ===
- Venue: Multi-Purpose Sports Complex, Road Town, British Virgin Islands
- Dates: June 7–8, 2012
- All times are Atlantic Standard Time (UTC−04:00)

==== Preliminary round ====
Pos	Team	Pld	W	L	Pts	SPW	SPL	SPR	SW	SL	SR
1	Dominica	3	3	0	13	256	171	1.497	9	2	4.500
2	Saint Kitts and Nevis	3	2	1	12	248	189	1.312	8	3	2.667
3	British Virgin Islands	3	1	2	5	163	182	0.896	3	6	0.500
4	Montserrat	3	0	3	0	100	225	0.444	0	9	0.000

Date	Time		Score		Set 1	Set 2	Set 3	Set 4	Set 5	Total	Report
07 Jun	09:00	Dominica	3–2	Saint Kitts and Nevis	25–13	19–25	20–25	25–20	17–15	106–98	P2 P3
07 Jun	11:00	British Virgin Islands	3–0	Montserrat	25–14	25–4	25–14			75–32	P2 P3
07 Jun	18:00	Dominica	3–0	Montserrat	25–7	25–4	25–14			75–25	P2 P3
07 Jun	20:00	British Virgin Islands	0–3	Saint Kitts and Nevis	11–25	18–25	11–25			40–75	P2 P3
08 Jun	09:00	Saint Kitts and Nevis	3–0	Montserrat	25–18	25–10	25–15			75–43	P2 P3
08 Jun	11:00	British Virgin Islands	0–3	Dominica	16–25	12–25	20–25			48–75	P2 P3

==== Final round ====
===== 3rd place =====
Date	Time		Score		Set 1	Set 2	Set 3	Set 4	Set 5	Total	Report
08 Jun	19:00	British Virgin Islands	3–0	Montserrat	25–12	25–10	25–21			75–43	P2 P3

===== Final =====
Date	Time		Score		Set 1	Set 2	Set 3	Set 4	Set 5	Total	Report
08 Jun	21:00	Dominica	3–2	Saint Kitts and Nevis	25–22	19–25	20–25	25–23	15–13	104–108	P2 P3

==== Final standing ====
Rank	Team
1	Dominica
2	Saint Kitts and Nevis
3	British Virgin Islands
4	Montserrat

=== Pool G ===
- Venue: Gimnasio Nacional José Adolfo Pineda, San Salvador, El Salvador
- Dates: May 18–20, 2012
- All times are Central Standard Time (UTC−06:00)

Pos	Team	Pld	W	L	Pts	SPW	SPL	SPR	SW	SL	SR
1	Honduras	3	3	0	13	270	207	1.304	9	2	4.500
2	Panama	3	2	1	9	240	190	1.263	6	4	1.500
3	El Salvador	3	1	2	8	257	246	1.045	6	6	1.000
4	Turks and Caicos Islands	3	0	3	0	101	225	0.449	0	9	0.000

Date	Time		Score		Set 1	Set 2	Set 3	Set 4	Set 5	Total	Report
18 May	18:00	Panama	0–3	Honduras	26–28	21–25	20–25			67–78	P2 P3
18 May	21:00	El Salvador	3–0	Turks and Caicos Islands	25–11	25–8	25–12			75–31	P2 P3
19 May	16:00	Panama	3–0	Turks and Caicos Islands	25–8	25–6	25–15			75–29	P2 P3
19 May	18:00	El Salvador	2–3	Honduras	25–21	33–31	18–25	14–25	9–15	99–117	P2 P3
20 May	08:00	Honduras	3–0	Turks and Caicos Islands	25–10	25–14	25–17			75–41	P2 P3
20 May	13:00	El Salvador	1–3	Panama	20–25	25–23	18–25	20–25		83–98	P2 P3

=== Pool H ===
- Venue: Gimnasio Nacional, San José, Costa Rica
- Dates: July 27–29, 2012
- All times are Central Standard Time (UTC−06:00)

Pos	Team	Pld	W	L	Pts	SPW	SPL	SPR	SW	SL	SR
1	Guatemala	3	3	0	13	255	188	1.356	9	2	4.500
2	Costa Rica	3	2	1	12	253	210	1.205	8	3	2.667
3	Nicaragua	3	1	2	5	182	200	0.910	3	6	0.500
4	Belize	3	0	3	0	134	226	0.593	0	9	0.000

Date	Time		Score		Set 1	Set 2	Set 3	Set 4	Set 5	Total	Report
27 Jul	17:00	Guatemala	3–0	Nicaragua	25–19	25–15	25–18			75–52	P2 P3
27 Jul	19:00	Costa Rica	3–0	Belize	25–14	25–18	25–19			75–51	P2 P3
28 Jul	15:00	Guatemala	3–0	Belize	25–16	25–10	25–7			75–33	P2 P3
28 Jul	17:00	Nicaragua	0–3	Costa Rica	17–25	21–25	16–25			54–75	P2 P3
29 Jul	15:00	Belize	0–3	Nicaragua	15–25	11–25	24–26			50–76	P2 P3
29 Jul	17:00	Costa Rica	2–3	Guatemala	25–22	20–25	20–25	25–18	13–15	103–105	P2 P3

== Second round ==
=== Pool I ===
- Venue: (Collectivity of Saint Martin) Omnisports Hall, Marigot, Saint Martin
- Dates: August 10–11, 2013
- All times are Atlantic Standard Time (UTC−04:00).

==== Preliminary round ====
Pos	Team	Pld	W	L	Pts	SPW	SPL	SPR	SW	SL	SR
1	Bahamas	3	3	0	13	253	215	1.177	9	2	4.500
2	Barbados	3	2	1	10	216	186	1.161	6	3	2.000
3	Nicaragua	3	1	2	7	221	230	0.961	5	6	0.833
4	Saint Martin	3	0	3	0	166	225	0.738	0	9	0.000

Date	Time		Score		Set 1	Set 2	Set 3	Set 4	Set 5	Total	Report
10 Aug	09:00	Barbados	3–0	Nicaragua	25–13	25–15	25–23			75–51	P2 P3
10 Aug	11:00	Bahamas	3–0	Saint Martin	25–16	25–16	25–22			75–54	P2 P3
10 Aug	18:00	Barbados	0–3	Bahamas	23–25	21–25	22–25			66–75	P2 P3
10 Aug	20:00	Saint Martin	0–3	Nicaragua	23–25	15–25	14–25			52–75	P2 P3
11 Aug	09:00	Bahamas	3–2	Nicaragua	19–25	25–20	25–19	19–25	15–6	103–95	P2 P3
11 Aug	11:00	Saint Martin	0–3	Barbados	22–25	18–25	20–25			60–75	P2 P3

==== Final round ====
===== 3rd place =====
Date	Time		Score		Set 1	Set 2	Set 3	Set 4	Set 5	Total	Report
11 Aug	18:00	Nicaragua	3–0	Saint Martin	25–21	25–17	25–21			75–59	P2 P3

===== Final =====
Date	Time		Score		Set 1	Set 2	Set 3	Set 4	Set 5	Total	Report
11 Aug	20:00	Bahamas	1–3	Barbados	15–25	25–22	17–25	23–25		80–97	P2 P3

==== Final standing ====
Rank	Team
1	Barbados
2	Bahamas
3	Nicaragua
4	Saint Martin

=== Pool J ===
- Venue: Beausejour Indoor Stadium, Gros Islet, Saint Lucia
- Dates: April 27–28, 2013
- All times are Atlantic Standard Time (UTC−04:00)

==== Preliminary round ====
Pos	Team	Pld	W	L	Pts	SPW	SPL	SPR	SW	SL	SR
1	Saint Lucia	3	2	1	10	270	239	1.130	7	4	1.750
2	Haiti	3	2	1	10	252	230	1.096	7	4	1.750
3	El Salvador	3	2	1	9	278	266	1.045	7	5	1.400
4	Saint Kitts and Nevis	3	0	3	1	185	250	0.740	1	9	0.111

Date	Time		Score		Set 1	Set 2	Set 3	Set 4	Set 5	Total	Report
27 Apr	09:00	Saint Lucia	3–1	Haiti	26–28	25–16	25–20	25–18		101–82	P2 P3
27 Apr	11:00	El Salvador	3–1	Saint Kitts and Nevis	25–27	25–18	25–17	25–15		100–77	P2 P3
27 Apr	18:00	Haiti	3–0	Saint Kitts and Nevis	25–22	25–13	25–11			75–46	P2 P3
27 Apr	20:00	Saint Lucia	1–3	El Salvador	23–25	25–19	22–25	24–26		94–95	P2 P3
28 Apr	09:00	El Salvador	1–3	Haiti	25–20	18–25	18–25	22–25		83–95	P2 P3
28 Apr	11:00	Saint Lucia	3–0	Saint Kitts and Nevis	25–21	25–23	25–18			75–62	P2 P3

==== Final round ====
===== 3rd place =====
Date	Time		Score		Set 1	Set 2	Set 3	Set 4	Set 5	Total	Report
28 Apr	18:00	El Salvador	3–0	Saint Kitts and Nevis	25–16	25–22	25–21			75–59	P2 P3

===== Final =====
Date	Time		Score		Set 1	Set 2	Set 3	Set 4	Set 5	Total	Report
28 Apr	20:00	Saint Lucia	3–1	Haiti	27–25	25–13	17–25	25–20		94–83	P2 P3

==== Final standing ====
Rank	Team
1	Saint Lucia
2	Haiti
3	El Salvador
4	Saint Kitts and Nevis

=== Pool K ===
- Venue: Multi-Purpose Sports Complex, Road Town, British Virgin Islands
- Dates: July 27–28, 2013
- All times are Atlantic Standard Time (UTC−04:00)

==== Preliminary round ====
Pos	Team	Pld	W	L	Pts	SPW	SPL	SPR	SW	SL	SR
1	Dominican Republic	3	3	0	15	225	125	1.800	9	0	MAX
2	Panama	3	2	1	10	204	168	1.214	6	3	2.000
3	Saint Vincent and the Grenadines	3	1	2	4	180	227	0.793	3	7	0.429
4	British Virgin Islands	3	0	3	1	158	247	0.640	1	9	0.111

Date	Time		Score		Set 1	Set 2	Set 3	Set 4	Set 5	Total	Report
27 Jul	09:00	Dominican Republic	3–0	St. Vincent & the Grenadines	25–13	25–9	25–14			75–36	P2 P3
27 Jul	11:00	British Virgin Islands	0–3	Panama	18–25	14–25	14–25			46–75	P2 P3
27 Jul	18:00	Dominican Republic	3–0	Panama	25–18	25–14	25–22			75–54	P2 P3
27 Jul	20:00	British Virgin Islands	1–3	St. Vincent & the Grenadines	18–25	25–22	12–25	22–25		77–97	P2 P3
28 Jul	09:00	St. Vincent & the Grenadines	0–3	Panama	18–25	17–25	12–25			47–75	P2 P3
28 Jul	11:00	British Virgin Islands	0–3	Dominican Republic	12–25	12–25	11–25			35–75	P2 P3

==== Final round ====
===== 3rd place =====
Date	Time		Score		Set 1	Set 2	Set 3	Set 4	Set 5	Total	Report
28 Jul	18:00	St. Vincent & the Grenadines	3–1	British Virgin Islands	17–25	25–23	25–19	25–18		92–85	P2 P3

===== Final =====
Date	Time		Score		Set 1	Set 2	Set 3	Set 4	Set 5	Total	Report
28 Jul	20:00	Dominican Republic	3–0	Panama	25–10	25–6	25–14			75–30	P2 P3

==== Final standing ====
Rank	Team
1	Dominican Republic
2	Panama
3	St. Vincent & the Grenadines
4	British Virgin Islands

=== Pool L ===
- Venue: Centro Deportivo Betico Croes, Santa Cruz, Aruba
- Dates: May 18–19, 2013
- All times are Atlantic Standard Time (UTC−04:00)

==== Preliminary round ====
Pos	Team	Pld	W	L	Pts	SPW	SPL	SPR	SW	SL	SR
1	Costa Rica	3	3	0	13	281	220	1.277	9	2	4.500
2	Aruba	3	2	1	7	248	265	0.936	6	6	1.000
3	Curaçao	3	1	2	8	269	262	1.027	6	6	1.000
4	Antigua and Barbuda	3	0	3	2	217	268	0.810	2	9	0.222

Date	Time		Score		Set 1	Set 2	Set 3	Set 4	Set 5	Total	Report
18 May	09:00	Curaçao	1–3	Costa Rica	19–25	29–27	17–25	26–28		91–105	P2 P3
18 May	11:00	Aruba	3–1	Antigua and Barbuda	17–25	25–20	25–21	25–21		92–87	P2 P3
18 May	18:00	Antigua and Barbuda	1–3	Costa Rica	28–26	17–25	18–25	20–25		83–101	P2 P3
18 May	20:00	Aruba	3–2	Curaçao	20–25	25–15	23–25	27–25	15–13	110–103	P2 P3
19 May	09:00	Antigua and Barbuda	0–3	Curaçao	11–25	17–25	19–25			47–75	P2 P3
19 May	11:00	Aruba	0–3	Costa Rica	15–25	12–25	19–25			46–75	P2 P3

==== Final round ====
===== 3rd place =====
Date	Time		Score		Set 1	Set 2	Set 3	Set 4	Set 5	Total	Report
19 May	18:00	Curaçao	3–0	Antigua and Barbuda	25–22	25–17	25–19			75–58	P2 P3

===== Final =====
Date	Time		Score		Set 1	Set 2	Set 3	Set 4	Set 5	Total	Report
19 May	20:00	Costa Rica	3–1	Aruba	25–22	25–22	19–25	25–15		94–84	P2 P3

==== Final standing ====
Rank	Team
1	Costa Rica
2	Aruba
3	Curaçao
4	Antigua and Barbuda

=== Pool M ===
- Venue: Ismay van Wilgen Sports Hall, Paramaribo, Suriname
- Dates: June 15–16, 2013
- All times are Suriname Time (UTC−03:00)

==== Preliminary round ====
Pos	Team	Pld	W	L	Pts	SPW	SPL	SPR	SW	SL	SR
1	Suriname	3	2	1	10	208	169	1.231	6	3	2.000
2	Guatemala	3	2	1	10	221	182	1.214	6	3	2.000
3	Martinique	3	2	1	10	213	190	1.121	6	3	2.000
4	Anguilla	3	0	3	0	124	225	0.551	0	9	0.000

Date	Time		Score		Set 1	Set 2	Set 3	Set 4	Set 5	Total	Report
15 Jun	09:00	Suriname	3–0	Anguilla	25–11	25–13	25–13			75–37	P2 P3
15 Jun	11:00	Martinique	3–0	Guatemala	25–20	31–29	25–22			81–71	P2 P3
15 Jun	18:00	Guatemala	3–0	Anguilla	25–10	25–15	25–18			75–43	P2 P3
15 Jun	20:00	Suriname	3–0	Martinique	25–17	25–19	25–21			75–57	P2 P3
16 Jun	09:00	Anguilla	0–3	Martinique	11–25	17–25	16–25			44–75	P2 P3
16 Jun	11:00	Suriname	0–3	Guatemala	17–25	18–25	23–25			58–75	P2 P3

==== Final round ====
===== 3rd place =====
Date	Time		Score		Set 1	Set 2	Set 3	Set 4	Set 5	Total	Report
16 Jun	18:00	Martinique	3–0	Anguilla	25–18	25–12	25–16			75–46	P2 P3

===== Final =====
Date	Time		Score		Set 1	Set 2	Set 3	Set 4	Set 5	Total	Report
16 Jun	20:00	Suriname	1–3	Guatemala	22–25	23–25	26–24	21–25		92–99	P2 P3

==== Final standing ====
Rank	Team
1	Guatemala
2	Suriname
3	Martinique
4	Anguilla

=== Pool N ===
- Venue: Hall Paul Chonchon, Pointe-à-Pitre, Guadeloupe
- Dates: June 15–16, 2013
- All times are Atlantic Standard Time (UTC−04:00)

==== Preliminary round ====
Pos	Team	Pld	W	L	Pts	SPW	SPL	SPR	SW	SL	SR
1	Guadeloupe	3	3	0	13	249	202	1.233	9	2	4.500
2	Honduras	3	2	1	12	252	189	1.333	8	3	2.667
3	Dominica	3	1	2	4	200	233	0.858	3	7	0.429
4	Grenada	3	0	3	1	164	241	0.680	1	9	0.111

Date	Time		Score		Set 1	Set 2	Set 3	Set 4	Set 5	Total	Report
15 Jun	09:00	Guadeloupe	3–0	Grenada	25–18	25–16	25–17			75–51	P2 P3
15 Jun	11:00	Dominica	0–3	Honduras	17–25	21–25	22–25			60–75	P2 P3
15 Jun	18:00	Honduras	3–0	Grenada	25–11	25–11	25–8			75–30	P2 P3
15 Jun	20:00	Guadeloupe	3–0	Dominica	25–15	25–12	25–22			75–49	P2 P3
16 Jun	09:00	Grenada	1–3	Dominica	25–16	17–25	22–25	19–25		83–91	P2 P3
16 Jun	11:00	Guadeloupe	3–2	Honduras	14–25	20–25	25–22	25–18	15–12	99–102	P2 P3

==== Final round ====
===== 3rd place =====
Date	Time		Score		Set 1	Set 2	Set 3	Set 4	Set 5	Total	Report
16 Jun	18:00	Dominica	3–0	Grenada	25–14	25–21	25–19			75–54	P2 P3

===== Final =====
Date	Time		Score		Set 1	Set 2	Set 3	Set 4	Set 5	Total	Report
16 Jun	20:00	Guadeloupe	0–3	Honduras	21–25	14–25	11–25			46–75	P2 P3

==== Final standing ====
Rank	Team
1	Honduras
2	Guadeloupe
3	Dominica
4	Grenada

=== Second placed teams ===
Pool	Rank	Team
I	7	Bahamas
K	11	Panama
M	23	Suriname
J	24	Haiti
L	26	Aruba
N	35	Guadeloupe

== Third round ==
=== Pool O ===
- Venue: OTC Sports Center I, Colorado Springs, United States
- Dates: May 15–18, 2014
- All times are Mountain Daylight Time (UTC−06:00)

==== Preliminary round ====
Pos	Team	Pld	W	L	Pts	SPW	SPL	SPR	SW	SL	SR
1	United States	3	3	0	15	225	105	2.143	9	0	MAX
2	Guatemala	3	2	1	10	192	175	1.097	6	3	2.000
3	Haiti	3	1	2	4	169	245	0.690	3	7	0.429
4	Saint Lucia	3	0	3	1	181	242	0.748	1	9	0.111

Date	Time		Score		Set 1	Set 2	Set 3	Set 4	Set 5	Total	Report
15 May	17:00	Guatemala	3–0	Haiti	25–17	25–20	25–8			75–45	P2 P3
15 May	19:00	United States	3–0	Saint Lucia	25–13	25–9	25–9			75–31	P2 P3
16 May	17:00	Haiti	3–1	Saint Lucia	12–25	25–23	25–19	30–28		92–95	P2 P3
16 May	19:00	United States	3–0	Guatemala	25–12	25–14	25–16			75–42	P2 P3
17 May	17:00	Saint Lucia	0–3	Guatemala	18–25	18–25	19–25			55–75	P2 P3
17 May	19:00	United States	3–0	Haiti	25–7	25–10	25–15			75–32	P2 P3

==== Final round ====
===== 3rd place =====
Date	Time		Score		Set 1	Set 2	Set 3	Set 4	Set 5	Total	Report
18 May	17:00	Haiti	2–3	Saint Lucia	25–15	23–25	25–18	21–25	12–15	106–98	P2 P3

===== Final =====
Date	Time		Score		Set 1	Set 2	Set 3	Set 4	Set 5	Total	Report
18 May	19:00	United States	3–0	Guatemala	25–18	25–22	25–15			75–55	P2 P3

==== Final standing ====
Rank	Team
1	United States
2	Guatemala
3	Saint Lucia
4	Haiti

=== Pool P ===
- Venue: Coliseo de la Ciudad Deportiva, Havana, Cuba
- Dates: May 21–24, 2014
- All times are Cuba Daylight Time (UTC−04:00)

==== Preliminary round ====
Pos	Team	Pld	W	L	Pts	SPW	SPL	SPR	SW	SL	SR
1	Cuba	3	3	0	14	245	154	1.591	9	1	9.000
2	Dominican Republic	3	2	1	11	220	200	1.100	7	3	2.333
3	Barbados	3	1	2	5	176	206	0.854	3	6	0.500
4	Suriname	3	0	3	0	144	225	0.640	0	9	0.000

Date	Time		Score		Set 1	Set 2	Set 3	Set 4	Set 5	Total	Report
21 May	15:00	Dominican Republic	3–0	Suriname	25–15	25–19	25–21			75–55	P2 P3
21 May	17:00	Cuba	3–0	Barbados	25–18	25–19	25–14			75–51	P2 P3
22 May	15:00	Barbados	0–3	Dominican Republic	13–25	16–25	21–25			50–75	P2 P3
22 May	17:00	Cuba	3–0	Suriname	25–13	25–9	25–11			75–33	P2 P3
23 May	15:00	Suriname	0–3	Barbados	22–25	18–25	16–25			56–75	P2 P3
23 May	17:00	Cuba	3–1	Dominican Republic	25–14	20–25	25–17	25–14		95–70	P2 P3

==== Final round ====
===== 3rd place =====
Date	Time		Score		Set 1	Set 2	Set 3	Set 4	Set 5	Total	Report
24 May	15:00	Barbados	3–2	Suriname	31–29	23–25	25–14	24–26	16–14	119–108	P2 P3

===== Final =====
Date	Time		Score		Set 1	Set 2	Set 3	Set 4	Set 5	Total	Report
24 May	17:00	Cuba	3–1	Dominican Republic	25–14	26–28	25–18	25–12		101–72	P2 P3

==== Final standing ====
Rank	Team
1	Cuba
2	Dominican Republic
3	Barbados
4	Suriname

=== Pool Q ===
- Venue: Hershey Centre, Mississauga, Canada
- Dates: May 16–19, 2014
- All times are Eastern Daylight Time (UTC−04:00)

==== Preliminary round ====
Pos	Team	Pld	W	L	Pts	SPW	SPL	SPR	SW	SL	SR
1	Canada	3	3	0	15	225	134	1.679	9	0	MAX
2	Costa Rica	3	2	1	7	240	270	0.889	6	6	1.000
3	Panama	3	1	2	5	237	263	0.901	4	7	0.571
4	Trinidad and Tobago	3	0	3	3	241	276	0.873	3	9	0.333

Date	Time		Score		Set 1	Set 2	Set 3	Set 4	Set 5	Total	Report
16 May	16:00	Trinidad and Tobago	2–3	Costa Rica	25–17	23–25	20–25	25–18	13–15	106–100	P2 P3
16 May	20:00	Canada	3–0	Panama	25–17	25–12	25–18			75–47	P2 P3
17 May	16:00	Costa Rica	3–1	Panama	25–21	25–20	23–25	25–23		98–89	P2 P3
17 May	18:00	Canada	3–0	Trinidad and Tobago	25–13	25–11	25–21			75–45	P2 P3
18 May	14:00	Panama	3–1	Trinidad and Tobago	26–28	25–23	25–20	25–19		101–90	P2 P3
18 May	20:00	Canada	3–0	Costa Rica	25–14	25–16	25–12			75–42	P2 P3

==== Final round ====
===== 3rd place =====
Date	Time		Score		Set 1	Set 2	Set 3	Set 4	Set 5	Total	Report
19 May	14:00	Panama	1–3	Trinidad and Tobago	19–25	28–26	20–25	19–25		86–101	P2 P3

===== Final =====
Date	Time		Score		Set 1	Set 2	Set 3	Set 4	Set 5	Total	Report
19 May	18:00	Canada	3–0	Costa Rica	25–14	25–15	25–16			75–45	P2 P3

==== Final standing ====
Rank	Team
1	Canada
2	Costa Rica
3	Trinidad and Tobago
4	Panama

=== Pool R ===
- Venue: Auditorio Juan Pachín Vicéns, Ponce, Puerto Rico
- Dates: May 22–25, 2014
- All times are Atlantic Standard Time (UTC−04:00)

==== Preliminary round ====
Pos	Team	Pld	W	L	Pts	SPW	SPL	SPR	SW	SL	SR
1	Puerto Rico	3	3	0	15	225	149	1.510	9	0	MAX
2	Mexico	3	2	1	9	224	197	1.137	6	4	1.500
3	Bahamas	3	1	2	6	199	235	0.847	4	6	0.667
4	Honduras	3	0	3	0	158	225	0.702	0	9	0.000

Date	Time		Score		Set 1	Set 2	Set 3	Set 4	Set 5	Total	Report
22 May	16:00	Mexico	3–1	Bahamas	22–25	25–15	25–13	25–21		97–74	P2 P3
22 May	18:00	Puerto Rico	3–0	Honduras	25–22	25–11	25–14			75–47	P2 P3
23 May	14:00	Bahamas	3–0	Honduras	25–22	25–19	25–22			75–63	P2 P3
23 May	20:00	Puerto Rico	3–0	Mexico	25–13	25–20	25–19			75–52	P2 P3
24 May	16:00	Honduras	0–3	Mexico	15–25	15–25	18–25			48–75	P2 P3
24 May	20:00	Puerto Rico	3–0	Bahamas	25–19	25–17	25–14			75–50	P2 P3

==== Final round ====
===== 3rd place =====
Date	Time		Score		Set 1	Set 2	Set 3	Set 4	Set 5	Total	Report
25 May	14:00	Bahamas	3–0	Honduras	25–15	25–19	25–23			75–57	P2 P3

===== Final =====
Date	Time		Score		Set 1	Set 2	Set 3	Set 4	Set 5	Total	Report
25 May	20:00	Puerto Rico	0–3	Mexico	23–25	21–25	23–25			67–75	P2 P3

==== Final standing ====
Rank	Team
1	Mexico
2	Puerto Rico
3	Bahamas
4	Honduras

== Final round ==
=== Playoff ===
- Venue: Coliseo Guillermo Angulo, Carolina, Puerto Rico
- Dates: July 17–20, 2014
- All times are Atlantic Standard Time (UTC−04:00)

==== Preliminary round ====
Pos	Team	Pld	W	L	Pts	SPW	SPL	SPR	SW	SL	SR
1	Puerto Rico	3	3	0	13	256	180	1.422	9	2	4.500
2	Dominican Republic	3	2	1	11	266	256	1.039	8	4	2.000
3	Costa Rica	3	1	2	6	216	236	0.915	4	6	0.667
4	Guatemala	3	0	3	0	163	229	0.712	0	9	0.000

Date	Time		Score		Set 1	Set 2	Set 3	Set 4	Set 5	Total	Report
17 Jul	17:00	Guatemala	0–3	Dominican Republic	27–29	13–25	18–25			58–79	P2 P3
17 Jul	19:30	Puerto Rico	3–0	Costa Rica	25–16	25–19	25–14			75–49	P2 P3
18 Jul	17:00	Dominican Republic	3–1	Costa Rica	25–23	25–22	20–25	25–22		95–92	P2 P3
18 Jul	19:30	Puerto Rico	3–0	Guatemala	25–17	25–13	25–9			75–39	P2 P3
19 Jul	17:00	Costa Rica	3–0	Guatemala	25–23	25–20	25–23			75–66	P2 P3
19 Jul	19:30	Puerto Rico	3–2	Dominican Republic	20–25	25–14	21–25	25–15	15–13	106–92	P2 P3

==== Final round ====
===== 3rd place =====
Date	Time		Score		Set 1	Set 2	Set 3	Set 4	Set 5	Total	Report
20 Jul	16:30	Costa Rica	0–3	Guatemala	23–25	23–25	22–25			68–75	P2 P3

===== Final =====
Date	Time		Score		Set 1	Set 2	Set 3	Set 4	Set 5	Total	Report
20 Jul	19:00	Puerto Rico	3–0	Dominican Republic	25–19	25–23	25–17			75–59	P2 P3

==== Final standing ====
Rank	Team
1	Puerto Rico
2	Dominican Republic
3	Guatemala
4	Costa Rica
