= 2014 FIVB Men's Volleyball World Championship qualification (AVC) =

- Dates: 5 June 2013 – 22 September 2013
- Teams: 29 (from 1 confederation)

The AVC qualification for the 2014 FIVB Men's Volleyball World Championship saw member nations compete for four places at the finals in Poland.

== Draw ==
29 AVC national teams entered qualification. (Yemen later withdrew) The teams were distributed according to their geographical positions. Teams ranked 1–5 in FIVB World Rankings did not compete in the zonal rounds, and automatically qualified for the final round. New Zealand also qualified automatically as the only registered team from Oceania.

Berths for final round

Zone	Total	Automatic	Remaining
Central Asia	4	1	3
Eastern Asia	4	3	1
Oceania	2	1	1
Southeastern Asia	2	0	2
Western Asia	4	0	4

Subzonal round

Western Asia 1	Western Asia 2	Western Asia 3
Iraq; Jordan; Lebanon; Syria	Kuwait; Saudi Arabia; ~~Yemen~~	Bahrain; Qatar; United Arab Emirates

Zonal round

Central Asia 1	Central Asia 2	Eastern Asia
Afghanistan; Kazakhstan; Uzbekistan	India; Maldives; Pakistan; Sri Lanka	Chinese Taipei; Hong Kong
Southeastern Asia	Western Asia 4	Western Asia 5
Indonesia; Myanmar; Thailand; Vietnam	1st Subzonal Western 1; 2nd Subzonal Western 3; 2nd Subzonal Western 2	1st Subzonal Western 2; 1st Subzonal Western 3; 2nd Subzonal Western 1

Final round

The sixteen remaining teams were distributed according to their position in the FIVB Senior Men's Rankings as of 23 January 2013 using the serpentine system for their distribution. (Rankings shown in brackets)

Pool A	Pool B	Pool C	Pool D
Australia (11); Kazakhstan (48); Thailand (48); Kuwait (122)	Iran (14); Pakistan (41); Indonesia (52); Bahrain (122)	China (16); India (30); Chinese Taipei (53); Saudi Arabia (122)	Japan (19); South Korea (24); Qatar (53); New Zealand (78)

== Subzonal round ==
=== Western Asia 1 ===
- Venue: Ghazir Club Court, Beirut, Lebanon
- Dates: 7–9 June 2013
- All times are Eastern European Summer Time (UTC+03:00).

Pos	Team	Pld	W	L	Pts	SW	SL	SR	SPW	SPL	SPR
1	Lebanon	3	3	0	8	9	3	3.000	282	247	1.142
2	Iraq	3	2	1	6	6	4	1.500	236	221	1.068
3	Syria	3	1	2	3	6	8	0.750	280	302	0.927
4	Jordan	3	0	3	1	3	9	0.333	253	281	0.900

Date	Time		Score		Set 1	Set 2	Set 3	Set 4	Set 5	Total	Report
7 Jun	18:05	Iraq	3–1	Syria	25–14	25–19	24–26	25–23		99–82	P2
7 Jun	20:25	Lebanon	3–1	Jordan	26–28	25–20	25–21	25–23		101–92	P2
8 Jun	18:00	Jordan	0–3	Iraq	22–25	20–25	18–25			60–75	P2
8 Jun	20:00	Syria	2–3	Lebanon	19–25	25–16	14–25	25–21	10–15	93–102	P2
9 Jun	18:00	Syria	3–2	Jordan	25–20	19–25	21–25	25–22	15–9	105–101	P2
9 Jun	20:35	Iraq	0–3	Lebanon	27–29	13–25	22–25			62–79	P2

=== Western Asia 2 ===
- Venue: Yarmouk Club Hall, Kuwait City, Kuwait
- Dates: 8 June 2013
- All times are Arabia Standard Time (UTC+03:00).

Pos	Team	Pld	W	L	Pts	SW	SL	SR	SPW	SPL	SPR
1	Kuwait	1	1	0	3	3	0	MAX	75	66	1.136
2	Saudi Arabia	1	0	1	0	0	3	0.000	66	75	0.880

Date	Time		Score		Set 1	Set 2	Set 3	Set 4	Set 5	Total	Report
8 Jun	19:00	Kuwait	3–0	Saudi Arabia	25–20	25–23	25–23			75–66	Report

=== Western Asia 3 ===
- Venue: Mohammed Bin Hamad Al-Hitmi Hall, Doha, Qatar
- Dates: 5–7 June 2013
- All times are Arabia Standard Time (UTC+03:00).

Pos	Team	Pld	W	L	Pts	SW	SL	SR	SPW	SPL	SPR
1	Bahrain	2	2	0	5	6	2	3.000	181	141	1.284
2	Qatar	2	1	1	4	5	3	1.667	166	157	1.057
3	United Arab Emirates	2	0	2	0	0	6	0.000	101	150	0.673

Date	Time		Score		Set 1	Set 2	Set 3	Set 4	Set 5	Total	Report
5 Jun	19:15	Qatar	3–0	United Arab Emirates	25–15	25–18	25–18			75–51	Report
6 Jun	19:15	Bahrain	3–0	United Arab Emirates	25–19	25–11	25–20			75–50	Report
7 Jun	19:15	Qatar	2–3	Bahrain	25–18	25–23	14–25	18–25	9–15	91–106	

== Zonal round ==
=== Central Asia 1 ===
- Venue: Astana Ice Palace, Pavlodar, Kazakhstan
- Dates: 14–16 June 2013
- All times are Almaty Time (UTC+06:00).

Pos	Team	Pld	W	L	Pts	SW	SL	SR	SPW	SPL	SPR
1	Kazakhstan	2	2	0	6	6	0	MAX	150	107	1.402
2	Uzbekistan	2	1	1	3	3	3	1.000	129	133	0.970
3	Afghanistan	2	0	2	0	0	6	0.000	111	150	0.740

Date	Time		Score		Set 1	Set 2	Set 3	Set 4	Set 5	Total	Report
14 Jun	17:00	Kazakhstan	3–0	Uzbekistan	25–21	25–15	25–18			75–54	Report
15 Jun	17:00	Afghanistan	0–3	Uzbekistan	17–25	19–25	22–25			58–75	Report
16 Jun	17:00	Kazakhstan	3–0	Afghanistan	25–21	25–21	25–11			75–53	Report

=== Central Asia 2 ===
- Venue: Sugathadasa Indoor Stadium, Colombo, Sri Lanka
- Dates: 3–5 July 2013
- All times are Sri Lanka Standard Time (UTC+05:30).

Pos	Team	Pld	W	L	Pts	SW	SL	SR	SPW	SPL	SPR
1	India	3	3	0	9	9	0	MAX	228	170	1.341
2	Pakistan	3	2	1	5	6	5	1.200	241	219	1.100
3	Sri Lanka	3	1	2	4	5	6	0.833	233	237	0.983
4	Maldives	3	0	3	0	0	9	0.000	149	225	0.662

Date	Time		Score		Set 1	Set 2	Set 3	Set 4	Set 5	Total	Report
3 Jul	15:45	Sri Lanka	3–0	Maldives	25–20	25–12	25–23			75–55	P2
3 Jul	17:45	India	3–0	Pakistan	25–21	25–20	25–21			75–62	P2
4 Jul	15:00	Pakistan	3–2	Sri Lanka	25–14	22–25	17–25	25–17	15–12	104–93	P2
4 Jul	18:00	India	3–0	Maldives	25–17	25–14	25–12			75–43	P2
5 Jul	15:00	Pakistan	3–0	Maldives	25–13	25–18	25–20			75–51	P2
5 Jul	17:00	Sri Lanka	0–3	India	20–25	26–28	19–25			65–78	P2

=== Eastern Asia ===
- Venue: Taipei Gymnasium, Taipei, Chinese Taipei
- Dates: 29 June 2013
- All times are National Standard Time (UTC+08:00).

Pos	Team	Pld	W	L	Pts	SW	SL	SR	SPW	SPL	SPR
1	Chinese Taipei	1	1	0	3	3	0	MAX	75	53	1.415
2	Hong Kong	1	0	1	0	0	3	0.000	53	75	0.707

Date	Time		Score		Set 1	Set 2	Set 3	Set 4	Set 5	Total	Report
29 Jun	17:00	Hong Kong	0–3	Chinese Taipei	14–25	21–25	18–25			53–75	Report

=== Southeastern Asia ===
- Venue: Nakhon Pathom Gymnasium, Nakhon Pathom, Thailand
- Dates: 26–28 June 2013
- All times are Indochina Time (UTC+07:00).

Pos	Team	Pld	W	L	Pts	SW	SL	SR	SPW	SPL	SPR
1	Thailand	3	3	0	9	9	1	9.000	265	211	1.256
2	Indonesia	3	2	1	5	6	5	1.200	250	243	1.029
3	Myanmar	3	1	2	3	5	8	0.625	256	277	0.924
4	Vietnam	3	0	3	1	3	9	0.333	241	281	0.858

Date	Time		Score		Set 1	Set 2	Set 3	Set 4	Set 5	Total	Report
26 Jun	17:00	Thailand	3–1	Vietnam	28–30	25–23	25–21	25–17		103–91	P2
26 Jun	19:30	Myanmar	2–3	Indonesia	21–25	25–21	25–19	21–25	11–15	103–105	P2
27 Jun	15:00	Vietnam	0–3	Indonesia	18–25	16–25	19–25			53–75	P2
27 Jun	17:00	Thailand	3–0	Myanmar	25–16	25–15	25–19			75–50	P2
28 Jun	15:00	Myanmar	3–2	Vietnam	17–25	25–14	26–24	20–25	15–9	103–97	P2
28 Jun	17:30	Indonesia	0–3	Thailand	14–25	35–37	21–25			70–87	P2

=== Western Asia 4 ===
- Venue: Al-Shabab Indoor Stadium, Dubai, United Arab Emirates
- Dates: 5–7 July 2013
- All times are United Arab Emirates Standard Time (UTC+04:00).

Pos	Team	Pld	W	L	Pts	SW	SL	SR	SPW	SPL	SPR
1	Qatar	2	2	0	6	6	1	6.000	171	134	1.276
2	Saudi Arabia	2	1	1	2	4	5	0.800	178	196	0.908
3	Lebanon	2	0	2	1	2	6	0.333	157	176	0.892

Date	Time		Score		Set 1	Set 2	Set 3	Set 4	Set 5	Total	Report
5 Jul	19:30	Lebanon	2–3	Saudi Arabia	25–14	22–25	16–25	25–22	12–15	100–101	Result
6 Jul	19:30	Qatar	3–0	Lebanon	25–20	25–22	25–15			75–57	Result
7 Jul	19:30	Saudi Arabia	1–3	Qatar	19–25	25–21	17–25	16–25		77–96	Result

=== Western Asia 5 ===
- Venue: Isa Sports City Hall C, Riffa, Bahrain
- Dates: 4–6 July 2013
- All times are Arabia Standard Time (UTC+03:00).

Pos	Team	Pld	W	L	Pts	SW	SL	SR	SPW	SPL	SPR
1	Bahrain	2	2	0	6	6	0	MAX	150	122	1.230
2	Kuwait	2	1	1	2	3	5	0.600	175	172	1.017
3	Iraq	2	0	2	1	2	6	0.333	155	186	0.833

Date	Time		Score		Set 1	Set 2	Set 3	Set 4	Set 5	Total	Report
4 Jul	19:30	Kuwait	3–2	Iraq	25–21	22–25	25–14	24–26	15–11	111–97	Report
5 Jul	19:30	Bahrain	3–0	Iraq	25–21	25–17	25–20			75–58	Result
6 Jul	19:30	Bahrain	3–0	Kuwait	25–20	25–22	25–22			75–64	Result

== Final round ==
=== Pool A ===
- Venue: AIS Arena, Canberra, Australia
- Dates: 6–8 September 2013
- All times are Australian Eastern Standard Time (UTC+10:00).

Pos	Team	Pld	W	L	Pts	SW	SL	SR	SPW	SPL	SPR
1	Australia	3	3	0	9	9	1	9.000	242	190	1.274
2	Kazakhstan	3	2	1	6	7	3	2.333	235	197	1.193
3	Thailand	3	1	2	3	3	7	0.429	213	223	0.955
4	Kuwait	3	0	3	0	1	9	0.111	170	250	0.680

Date	Time		Score		Set 1	Set 2	Set 3	Set 4	Set 5	Total	Report
6 Sep	16:30	Thailand	0–3	Kazakhstan	17–25	15–25	22–25			54–75	Result
6 Sep	19:00	Australia	3–0	Kuwait	25–12	25–16	25–18			75–46	Result
7 Sep	16:30	Thailand	3–1	Kuwait	25–27	25–14	25–18	25–14		100–73	Result
7 Sep	19:00	Australia	3–1	Kazakhstan	17–25	25–23	25–20	25–17		92–85	Result
8 Sep	13:00	Kazakhstan	3–0	Kuwait	25–13	25–18	25–20			75–51	Result
8 Sep	15:30	Australia	3–0	Thailand	25–23	25–13	25–23			75–59	Result

=== Pool B ===
- Venue: Azadi Volleyball Hall, Tehran, Iran
- Dates: 11–13 September 2013
- All times are Iran Daylight Time (UTC+04:30).

Pos	Team	Pld	W	L	Pts	SW	SL	SR	SPW	SPL	SPR
1	Iran	3	3	0	9	9	0	MAX	225	137	1.642
2	Bahrain	3	2	1	6	6	3	2.000	197	199	0.990
3	Indonesia	3	1	2	3	3	6	0.500	175	207	0.845
4	Pakistan	3	0	3	0	0	9	0.000	171	225	0.760

Date	Time		Score		Set 1	Set 2	Set 3	Set 4	Set 5	Total	Report
11 Sep	15:00	Indonesia	0–3	Bahrain	16–25	20–25	21–25			57–75	P2
11 Sep	17:00	Iran	3–0	Pakistan	25–15	25–19	25–13			75–47	P2
12 Sep	15:00	Pakistan	0–3	Bahrain	22–25	23–25	22–25			67–75	P2
12 Sep	17:00	Iran	3–0	Indonesia	25–12	25–20	25–11			75–43	P2
13 Sep	15:00	Pakistan	0–3	Indonesia	15–25	23–25	19–25			57–75	P2
13 Sep	17:00	Iran	3–0	Bahrain	25–16	25–17	25–14			75–47	P2

=== Pool C ===
- Venue: Chenzhou Olympic Sports Centre, Chenzhou, China
- Dates: 20–22 September 2013
- All times are China Standard Time (UTC+08:00).

Pos	Team	Pld	W	L	Pts	SW	SL	SR	SPW	SPL	SPR
1	China	3	3	0	9	9	0	MAX	230	176	1.307
2	India	3	2	1	6	6	4	1.500	224	221	1.014
3	Chinese Taipei	3	1	2	2	4	8	0.500	249	270	0.922
4	Saudi Arabia	3	0	3	1	2	9	0.222	229	265	0.864

Date	Time		Score		Set 1	Set 2	Set 3	Set 4	Set 5	Total	Report
20 Sep	16:00	India	3–0	Saudi Arabia	25–20	25–21	25–19			75–60	P2
20 Sep	19:30	Chinese Taipei	0–3	China	20–25	12–25	21–25			53–75	P2
21 Sep	16:00	India	3–1	Chinese Taipei	25–19	21–25	25–18	26–24		97–86	P2
21 Sep	19:30	China	3–0	Saudi Arabia	28–26	25–20	27–25			80–71	P2
22 Sep	16:00	Saudi Arabia	2–3	Chinese Taipei	25–23	25–22	17–25	20–25	11–15	98–110	P2
22 Sep	19:30	China	3–0	India	25–17	25–18	25–17			75–52	P2

=== Pool D ===
- Venue: Park Arena, Komaki, Japan
- Dates: 5–8 September 2013
- All times are Japan Standard Time (UTC+09:00).

Pos	Team	Pld	W	L	Pts	SW	SL	SR	SPW	SPL	SPR
1	South Korea	3	3	0	9	9	0	MAX	226	153	1.477
2	Japan	3	2	1	6	6	3	2.000	203	177	1.147
3	Qatar	3	1	2	3	3	6	0.500	197	216	0.912
4	New Zealand	3	0	3	0	0	9	0.000	145	225	0.644

Date	Time		Score		Set 1	Set 2	Set 3	Set 4	Set 5	Total	Report
5 Sep	17:00	Japan	3–0	Qatar	25–18	25–22	25–18			75–58	Result
6 Sep	13:30	South Korea	3–0	New Zealand	25–16	25–9	25–11			75–36	Result
7 Sep	11:30	Qatar	0–3	South Korea	19–25	21–25	24–26			64–76	Result
7 Sep	14:00	Japan	3–0	New Zealand	25–14	25–20	25–10			75–44	Result
8 Sep	16:30	New Zealand	0–3	Qatar	22–25	22–25	21–25			65–75	Result
8 Sep	19:10	Japan	0–3	South Korea	20–25	20–25	13–25			53–75	Result
