= 2014 FIVB Men's Volleyball World Championship qualification (CEV) =

The CEV qualification for the 2014 FIVB Men's Volleyball World Championship saw member nations compete for eight places at the finals in Poland. The two best-ranked teams from the 2013 Men's European Volleyball Championship, plus six teams from the qualification tournaments qualified for the World Championship.

== 2013 European Championship ==
- Venues: Denmark and Poland
- Dates: 20–29 September 2013

Rank	Team
1st place, gold medalist(s)	Russia
2nd place, silver medalist(s)	Italy
3rd place, bronze medalist(s)	Serbia
4	Bulgaria
5	France
6	Germany
7	Belgium
8	Finland
9	Poland
10	Netherlands
11	Slovakia
12	Denmark
13	Slovenia
14	Turkey
15	Belarus
16	Czech Republic

Eliminated in third qualification round

- Croatia
- Greece
- Latvia

Eliminated in second qualification round

- Austria
- Estonia
- Great Britain
- Hungary
- Israel
- Macedonia
- Montenegro
- Portugal
- Romania
- Spain
- Sweden
- Ukraine

Eliminated in first qualification round

- Albania
- Andorra
- Cyprus
- Luxembourg
- Switzerland

== Draw ==
40 CEV national teams entered qualification. The teams were distributed according to their position in the CEV Senior Men's Confederation Rankings as of 1 January 2013 using the serpentine system for their distribution. (Rankings shown in brackets) Pools composition was determined by taking into consideration – as far as possible – the geographical location of the various countries. Teams ranked 1–12 do not compete in the first and second rounds, and automatically qualify for the third round. (Russia seed 2 and Italy seed 5, later qualified through European Championship)

First round

Pool A	Pool B	Pool C	Pool D
Netherlands (14); Croatia (26); Bosnia and Herzegovina (30); Azerbaijan (32)	Slovenia (15); Israel (23); Hungary (28); Moldova (34)	Estonia (16); Latvia (21); Belarus (25); Denmark (29)	Belgium (17); Austria (21); Romania (27); Northern Ireland (46)
Pool E	Pool F	Pool G	
Greece (18); Sweden (31); Norway (39); Iceland (40)	Ukraine (19); Montenegro (23); Macedonia (32); Albania (38)	Luxembourg (35); Cyprus (37); Scotland (41); San Marino (43)	

Second round

Pool H

2nd Pool A
2nd Pool B
2nd Pool C
2nd Pool D
2nd Pool E
2nd Pool F

Third round

The twenty remaining teams were distributed according to their position in the CEV Senior Men's Confederation Rankings as of 1 January 2013 using the serpentine system for their distribution. (Rankings shown in brackets)

Pool I	Pool J	Pool K
Bulgaria (3); Czech Republic (13); Netherlands (14); Cyprus (37)	Serbia (4); Portugal (12); Slovenia (15); Macedonia (32)	Germany (6); Turkey (11); Estonia (16); Croatia (26)
Pool L	Pool M	
France (7); Spain (10); Belgium (17); Belarus (25)	Finland (8); Slovakia (9); Greece (18); Ukraine (19)	

== First round ==
=== Pool A ===
- Venue: Dom odbojke Bojan Stranić, Zagreb, Croatia
- Dates: 24–26 May 2013
- All times are Central European Summer Time (UTC+02:00).

Pos	Team	Pld	W	L	Pts	SW	SL	SR	SPW	SPL	SPR	Qualification
1	Croatia	3	3	0	9	9	1	9.000	251	193	1.301	Pool K
2	Netherlands	3	2	1	6	6	3	2.000	219	178	1.230	Pool H
3	Azerbaijan	3	1	2	3	4	7	0.571	218	264	0.826	
4	Bosnia and Herzegovina	3	0	3	0	1	9	0.111	189	242	0.781	

Date	Time		Score		Set 1	Set 2	Set 3	Set 4	Set 5	Total	Report
24 May	17:00	Azerbaijan	1–3	Croatia	16–25	25–23	19–25	17–25		77–98	Report
24 May	19:30	Netherlands	3–0	Bosnia and Herzegovina	25–14	25–23	25–14			75–51	Report
25 May	17:00	Croatia	3–0	Bosnia and Herzegovina	25–12	25–19	25–16			75–47	Report
25 May	19:30	Netherlands	3–0	Azerbaijan	25–18	25–17	25–14			75–49	Report
26 May	17:00	Bosnia and Herzegovina	1–3	Azerbaijan	25–27	25–15	18–25	23–25		91–92	Report
26 May	19:30	Croatia	3–0	Netherlands	25–23	28–26	25–20			78–69	Report

=== Pool B ===
- Venue: Arena Stožice, Ljubljana, Slovenia
- Dates: 24–26 May 2013
- All times are Central European Summer Time (UTC+02:00).

Pos	Team	Pld	W	L	Pts	SW	SL	SR	SPW	SPL	SPR	Qualification
1	Slovenia	3	3	0	9	9	1	9.000	245	196	1.250	Pool J
2	Israel	3	1	2	4	6	7	0.857	282	292	0.966	Pool H
3	Moldova	3	1	2	3	4	7	0.571	241	260	0.927	
4	Hungary	3	1	2	2	4	8	0.500	259	279	0.928	

Date	Time		Score		Set 1	Set 2	Set 3	Set 4	Set 5	Total	Report
24 May	17:00	Israel	1–3	Slovenia	21–25	16–25	25–20	22–25		84–95	Report
24 May	19:30	Moldova	3–1	Hungary	25–18	25–22	28–30	25–18		103–88	Report
25 May	17:00	Slovenia	3–0	Hungary	25–20	25–20	25–17			75–57	Report
25 May	19:30	Israel	3–1	Moldova	22–25	25–21	25–19	25–18		97–83	Report
26 May	17:00	Slovenia	3–0	Moldova	25–18	25–22	25–15			75–55	Report
26 May	19:30	Hungary	3–2	Israel	25–17	26–28	23–25	25–19	15–12	114–101	Report

=== Pool C ===
- Venue: Rakvere Spordihall, Rakvere, Estonia
- Dates: 24–26 May 2013
- All times are Eastern European Summer Time (UTC+03:00).

Pos	Team	Pld	W	L	Pts	SW	SL	SR	SPW	SPL	SPR	Qualification
1	Estonia	3	2	1	7	8	4	2.000	267	246	1.085	Pool K
2	Belarus	3	2	1	6	7	3	2.333	238	218	1.092	Pool H
3	Latvia	3	2	1	5	6	5	1.200	241	241	1.000	
4	Denmark	3	0	3	0	0	9	0.000	185	226	0.819	

Date	Time		Score		Set 1	Set 2	Set 3	Set 4	Set 5	Total	Report
24 May	17:00	Denmark	0–3	Latvia	20–25	24–26	23–25			67–76	Report
24 May	20:00	Belarus	1–3	Estonia	23–25	25–20	17–25	21–25		86–95	Report
25 May	17:00	Latvia	0–3	Belarus	24–26	24–26	16–25			64–77	Report
25 May	20:00	Estonia	3–0	Denmark	25–15	25–21	25–23			75–59	Report
26 May	17:00	Belarus	3–0	Denmark	25–19	25–18	25–22			75–59	Report
26 May	20:00	Latvia	3–2	Estonia	25–18	16–25	25–19	20–25	15–10	101–97	Report

=== Pool D ===
- Venue: Sportcampus Lange Munte, Kortrijk, Belgium
- Dates: 23–26 May 2013
- All times are Central European Summer Time (UTC+02:00).

Pos	Team	Pld	W	L	Pts	SW	SL	SR	SPW	SPL	SPR	Qualification
1	Belgium	3	3	0	9	9	2	4.500	266	190	1.400	Pool L
2	Romania	3	2	1	6	7	3	2.333	233	205	1.137	Pool H
3	Austria	3	1	2	3	4	6	0.667	215	213	1.009	
4	Northern Ireland	3	0	3	0	0	9	0.000	119	225	0.529	

Date	Time		Score		Set 1	Set 2	Set 3	Set 4	Set 5	Total	Report
23 May	17:30	Romania	3–0	Northern Ireland	25–12	25–15	25–12			75–39	Report
23 May	20:00	Austria	1–3	Belgium	13–25	25–19	14–25	19–25		71–94	Report
24 May	20:00	Austria	0–3	Romania	23–25	19–25	27–29			69–79	Report
25 May	17:30	Northern Ireland	0–3	Austria	18–25	11–25	11–25			40–75	Report
25 May	20:00	Belgium	3–1	Romania	25–18	22–25	25–15	25–21		97–79	Report
26 May	20:00	Northern Ireland	0–3	Belgium	14–25	12–25	14–25			40–75	Report

=== Pool E ===
- Venue: Halmstad Arena, Halmstad, Sweden
- Dates: 24–26 May 2013
- All times are Central European Summer Time (UTC+02:00).

Pos	Team	Pld	W	L	Pts	SW	SL	SR	SPW	SPL	SPR	Qualification
1	Greece	3	3	0	8	9	2	4.500	257	193	1.332	Pool M
2	Sweden	3	2	1	5	6	5	1.200	255	226	1.128	Pool H
3	Norway	3	1	2	5	7	6	1.167	273	266	1.026	
4	Iceland	3	0	3	0	0	9	0.000	125	225	0.556	

Date	Time		Score		Set 1	Set 2	Set 3	Set 4	Set 5	Total	Report
24 May	16:00	Norway	2–3	Greece	16–25	25–21	25–21	21–25	9–15	96–107	Report
24 May	19:00	Sweden	3–0	Iceland	25–16	25–18	25–15			75–49	Report
25 May	15:00	Greece	3–0	Iceland	25–8	25–13	25–12			75–33	Report
25 May	18:00	Sweden	3–2	Norway	25–17	23–25	25–21	28–30	15–9	116–102	Report
26 May	15:00	Iceland	0–3	Norway	13–25	16–25	14–25			43–75	Report
26 May	18:00	Greece	3–0	Sweden	25–21	25–21	25–22			75–64	Report

=== Pool F ===
- Venue: SRC Kale, Skopje, Macedonia
- Dates: 24–26 May 2013
- All times are Central European Summer Time (UTC+02:00).

Pos	Team	Pld	W	L	Pts	SW	SL	SR	SPW	SPL	SPR	Qualification
1	Macedonia	3	3	0	9	9	0	MAX	231	182	1.269	Pool J
2	Ukraine	3	2	1	6	6	4	1.500	239	213	1.122	Pool H
3	Montenegro	3	1	2	3	4	7	0.571	253	248	1.020	
4	Albania	3	0	3	0	1	9	0.111	168	248	0.677	

Date	Time		Score		Set 1	Set 2	Set 3	Set 4	Set 5	Total	Report
24 May	15:30	Montenegro	1–3	Ukraine	20–25	25–27	25–23	20–25		90–100	Report
24 May	18:00	Macedonia	3–0	Albania	25–19	25–15	25–19			75–53	Report
25 May	15:30	Ukraine	3–0	Albania	25–16	25–12	25–16			75–44	Report
25 May	18:00	Montenegro	0–3	Macedonia	25–27	20–25	20–25			65–77	Report
26 May	15:30	Albania	1–3	Montenegro	16–25	25–23	16–25	14–25		71–98	Report
26 May	18:00	Macedonia	3–0	Ukraine	29–27	25–23	25–14			79–64	Report

=== Pool G ===
- Venue: Spyros Kyprianou Athletic Center, Limassol, Cyprus
- Dates: 6–8 June 2013
- All times are Eastern European Summer Time (UTC+03:00).

Pos	Team	Pld	W	L	Pts	SW	SL	SR	SPW	SPL	SPR	Qualification
1	Cyprus	3	3	0	9	9	1	9.000	251	182	1.379	Pool I
2	Scotland	3	2	1	6	6	3	2.000	217	196	1.107	
3	Luxembourg	3	1	2	3	3	6	0.500	190	195	0.974	
4	San Marino	3	0	3	0	1	9	0.111	163	248	0.657	

Date	Time		Score		Set 1	Set 2	Set 3	Set 4	Set 5	Total	Report
6 Jun	17:00	Scotland	3–0	Luxembourg	25–18	25–18	25–21			75–57	Report
6 Jun	20:00	San Marino	1–3	Cyprus	25–23	10–25	10–25	12–25		57–98	Report
7 Jun	17:00	Luxembourg	3–0	San Marino	25–12	25–17	25–16			75–45	Report
7 Jun	20:00	Cyprus	3–0	Scotland	28–26	25–22	25–19			78–67	Report
8 Jun	16:00	San Marino	0–3	Scotland	17–25	22–25	22–25			61–75	Report
8 Jun	19:00	Luxembourg	0–3	Cyprus	18–25	17–25	23–25			58–75	Report

== Second round ==
=== Pool H ===
- Venue: Topsportcentrum, Almere, Netherlands
- Dates: 2–6 October 2013
- All times are Central European Summer Time (UTC+02:00).

Pos	Team	Pld	W	L	Pts	SW	SL	SR	SPW	SPL	SPR	Qualification
1	Ukraine	5	4	1	12	12	4	3.000	389	345	1.128	Third round
2	Netherlands	5	4	1	12	12	4	3.000	403	360	1.119	Third round
3	Belarus	5	4	1	10	13	8	1.625	479	448	1.069	Third round
4	Romania	5	1	4	4	6	13	0.462	410	448	0.915	
5	Sweden	5	1	4	4	5	12	0.417	364	402	0.905	
6	Israel	5	1	4	3	5	12	0.417	364	406	0.897	

Date	Time		Score		Set 1	Set 2	Set 3	Set 4	Set 5	Total	Report
2 Oct	14:30	Sweden	3–0	Romania	28–26	25–14	25–23			78–63	Report
2 Oct	17:00	Ukraine	0–3	Belarus	27–29	19–25	19–25			65–79	Report
2 Oct	19:30	Netherlands	3–0	Israel	25–23	25–20	25–21			75–64	Report
3 Oct	14:30	Sweden	0–3	Ukraine	24–26	15–25	22–25			61–76	Report
3 Oct	17:00	Romania	3–1	Israel	24–26	25–18	29–27	25–20		103–91	Report
3 Oct	19:30	Belarus	1–3	Netherlands	24–26	23–25	26–24	20–25		93–100	Report
4 Oct	14:30	Ukraine	3–1	Romania	27–25	25–23	18–25	25–14		95–87	Report
4 Oct	17:00	Israel	1–3	Belarus	17–25	25–22	18–25	22–25		82–97	Report
4 Oct	19:30	Netherlands	3–0	Sweden	36–34	25–16	25–21			86–71	Report
5 Oct	14:30	Romania	2–3	Belarus	25–23	21–25	16–25	25–21	13–15	100–109	Report
5 Oct	17:00	Sweden	0–3	Israel	15–25	14–25	24–26			53–76	Report
5 Oct	19:30	Ukraine	3–0	Netherlands	25–23	25–23	25–21			75–67	Report
6 Oct	13:30	Belarus	3–2	Sweden	18–25	16–25	25–14	27–25	15–12	101–101	Report
6 Oct	16:00	Netherlands	3–0	Romania	25–18	25–23	25–16			75–57	Report
6 Oct	18:30	Israel	0–3	Ukraine	26–28	11–25	14–25			51–78	Report

== Third round ==
=== Pool I ===
- Venue: Opava Sports Hall, Opava, Czech Republic
- Dates: 3–5 January 2014
- All times are Central European Time (UTC+01:00).

Pos	Team	Pld	W	L	Pts	SW	SL	SR	SPW	SPL	SPR	Qualification
1	Bulgaria	3	2	1	7	8	3	2.667	254	205	1.239	Qualified
2	Netherlands	3	2	1	6	6	3	2.000	218	202	1.079	
3	Czech Republic	3	2	1	5	6	5	1.200	246	242	1.017	
4	Cyprus	3	0	3	0	0	9	0.000	156	225	0.693	

Date	Time		Score		Set 1	Set 2	Set 3	Set 4	Set 5	Total	Report
3 Jan	15:30	Cyprus	0–3	Bulgaria	18–25	19–25	5–25			42–75	Report
3 Jan	18:30	Czech Republic	0–3	Netherlands	14–25	19–25	33–35			66–85	Report
4 Jan	15:30	Bulgaria	3–0	Netherlands	25–19	27–25	25–14			77–58	Report
4 Jan	18:30	Cyprus	0–3	Czech Republic	18–25	21–25	16–25			55–75	Report
5 Jan	15:30	Netherlands	3–0	Cyprus	25–21	25–15	25–23			75–59	Report
5 Jan	18:30	Czech Republic	3–2	Bulgaria	22–25	25–18	25–22	18–25	15–12	105–102	Report

=== Pool J ===
- Venue: Čair Sports Center, Niš, Serbia
- Dates: 3–5 January 2014
- All times are Central European Time (UTC+01:00).

Pos	Team	Pld	W	L	Pts	SW	SL	SR	SPW	SPL	SPR	Qualification
1	Serbia	3	3	0	9	9	1	9.000	248	206	1.204	Qualified
2	Slovenia	3	2	1	6	6	4	1.500	234	229	1.022	
3	Portugal	3	1	2	3	5	6	0.833	245	258	0.950	
4	Macedonia	3	0	3	0	0	9	0.000	200	234	0.855	

Date	Time		Score		Set 1	Set 2	Set 3	Set 4	Set 5	Total	Report
3 Jan	15:00	Slovenia	3–1	Portugal	20–25	25–19	25–21	25–21		95–86	Report
3 Jan	18:00	Serbia	3–0	Macedonia	25–22	25–22	25–23			75–67	Report
4 Jan	15:00	Portugal	3–0	Macedonia	25–14	33–31	25–21			83–66	Report
4 Jan	18:00	Slovenia	0–3	Serbia	20–25	19–25	24–26			63–76	Report
5 Jan	15:00	Macedonia	0–3	Slovenia	24–26	20–25	23–25			67–76	Report
5 Jan	18:00	Serbia	3–1	Portugal	22–25	25–11	25–19	25–21		97–76	Report

=== Pool K ===
- Venue: MHP Arena, Ludwigsburg, Germany
- Dates: 3–5 January 2014
- All times are Central European Time (UTC+01:00).

Pos	Team	Pld	W	L	Pts	SW	SL	SR	SPW	SPL	SPR	Qualification
1	Germany	3	3	0	9	9	0	MAX	225	162	1.389	Qualified
2	Turkey	3	2	1	5	6	5	1.200	245	247	0.992	
3	Estonia	3	1	2	3	3	7	0.429	209	232	0.901	
4	Croatia	3	0	3	1	3	9	0.333	249	287	0.868	

Date	Time		Score		Set 1	Set 2	Set 3	Set 4	Set 5	Total	Report
3 Jan	15:30	Germany	3–0	Croatia	25–20	25–13	25–21			75–54	Report
3 Jan	18:30	Estonia	0–3	Turkey	19–25	15–25	24–26			58–76	Report
4 Jan	17:00	Germany	3–0	Estonia	25–18	25–18	25–17			75–53	Report
4 Jan	20:00	Croatia	2–3	Turkey	21–25	25–19	27–25	28–30	13–15	114–114	Report
5 Jan	14:00	Estonia	3–1	Croatia	25–21	23–25	25–17	25–18		98–81	Report
5 Jan	17:00	Turkey	0–3	Germany	17–25	19–25	19–25			55–75	Report

=== Pool L ===
- Venue: Halle Georges Carpentier, Paris, France
- Dates: 3–5 January 2014
- All times are Central European Time (UTC+01:00).

Pos	Team	Pld	W	L	Pts	SW	SL	SR	SPW	SPL	SPR	Qualification
1	Belgium	3	3	0	8	9	3	3.000	279	246	1.134	Qualified
2	France	3	2	1	7	8	4	2.000	273	246	1.110	Qualified
3	Spain	3	1	2	3	3	7	0.429	204	238	0.857	
4	Belarus	3	0	3	0	3	9	0.333	261	287	0.909	

Date	Time		Score		Set 1	Set 2	Set 3	Set 4	Set 5	Total	Report
3 Jan	17:00	Belarus	1–3	France	18–25	25–23	22–25	22–25		87–98	Report
3 Jan	20:00	Spain	0–3	Belgium	20–25	19–25	21–25			60–75	Report
4 Jan	17:00	France	3–0	Spain	25–16	25–17	25–18			75–51	Report
4 Jan	20:00	Belgium	3–1	Belarus	21–25	25–22	25–19	25–20		96–86	Report
5 Jan	15:00	Spain	3–1	Belarus	25–22	18–25	25–19	25–22		93–88	Report
5 Jan	18:00	France	2–3	Belgium	22–25	25–20	17–25	25–23	11–15	100–108	Report

=== Pool M ===
- Venue: Aréna Poprad, Poprad, Slovakia
- Dates: 3–5 January 2014
- All times are Central European Time (UTC+01:00).

Pos	Team	Pld	W	L	Pts	SW	SL	SR	SPW	SPL	SPR	Qualification
1	Finland	3	3	0	8	9	4	2.250	303	288	1.052	Qualified
2	Ukraine	3	2	1	5	7	5	1.400	270	264	1.023	
3	Slovakia	3	1	2	4	5	6	0.833	237	236	1.004	
4	Greece	3	0	3	1	3	9	0.333	261	283	0.922	

Date	Time		Score		Set 1	Set 2	Set 3	Set 4	Set 5	Total	Report
3 Jan	17:30	Greece	0–3	Slovakia	16–25	21–25	21–25			58–75	Report
3 Jan	20:30	Finland	3–1	Ukraine	23–25	25–20	25–22	25–22		98–89	Report
4 Jan	17:30	Slovakia	0–3	Ukraine	20–25	23–25	20–25			63–75	Report
4 Jan	20:30	Greece	1–3	Finland	21–25	23–25	25–19	31–33		100–102	Report
5 Jan	17:30	Ukraine	3–2	Greece	18–25	25–22	23–25	25–23	15–8	106–103	Report
5 Jan	20:30	Slovakia	2–3	Finland	26–24	19–25	19–25	25–14	10–15	99–103	Report

=== Second placed teams ===
Pos	Team	Pld	W	L	Pts	SW	SL	SR	SPW	SPL	SPR	Qualification
1	France	3	2	1	7	8	4	2.000	273	246	1.110	Qualified
2	Netherlands	3	2	1	6	6	3	2.000	218	202	1.079	
3	Slovenia	3	2	1	6	6	4	1.500	234	229	1.022	
4	Ukraine	3	2	1	5	7	5	1.400	270	264	1.023	
5	Turkey	3	2	1	5	6	5	1.200	245	247	0.992	
