= 2014 FIVB Men's Volleyball World Championship qualification =

- Dates: 9 August 2013 – 20 July 2014
- Teams: 149 (from 5 confederations)

The 2014 FIVB Men's Volleyball World Championship featured 24 teams. One place was allocated to the hosts, Poland, but no automatic place is given to the defending champions, Brazil. The remaining 23 places were determined by a qualification process, in which entrants from among the other teams from the five FIVB confederations competed.

== Qualified teams ==
Team	Qualified as	Qualification date	Appearance in finals
Poland	Host country	8 September 2008	16th
Argentina	2013 South American runners-up	9 August 2013	11th
Brazil	2013 South American champions	9 August 2013	16th
Australia	AVC Pool A winners	8 September 2013	6th
South Korea	AVC Pool D winners	8 September 2013	9th
Iran	AVC Pool B winners	13 September 2013	5th
Venezuela	CSV Qualifier winners	15 September 2013	11th
China	AVC Pool C winners	22 September 2013	13th
Russia	2013 European champions	28 September 2013	6th
Italy	2013 European runners-up	28 September 2013	16th
Germany	CEV Pool K winners	5 January 2014	4th
Serbia	CEV Pool J winners	5 January 2014	2nd
Bulgaria	CEV Pool I winners	5 January 2014	17th
Belgium	CEV Pool L winners	5 January 2014	8th
France	CEV Third Round best runners-up	5 January 2014	15th
Finland	CEV Pool M winners	5 January 2014	7th
Egypt	CAVB Pool U winners	10 February 2014	8th
Cameroon	CAVB Pool T winners	17 February 2014	3rd
Tunisia	CAVB Pool V winners	7 March 2014	9th
United States	NORCECA Pool O winners	18 May 2014	15th
Canada	NORCECA Pool Q winners	19 May 2014	10th
Cuba	NORCECA Pool P winners	24 May 2014	14th
Mexico	NORCECA Pool R winners	25 May 2014	5th
Puerto Rico	NORCECA Playoff winners	20 July 2014	4th

== Confederation qualification processes ==
The distribution by confederation for the 2014 FIVB Men's Volleyball World Championship was:

- Asia and Oceania (AVC): 4 places
- Africa (CAVB): 3 places
- Europe (CEV): 8 places (+ Poland qualified automatically as host nation for a total of 9 places)
- South America (CSV): 3 places
- North America (NORCECA): 5 places

=== AVC ===
- Afghanistan (Zonal Round)
- Australia (Final Round)
- Bahrain (Subzonal Round, Zonal Round, Final Round)
- China (Final Round)
- Chinese Taipei (Zonal Round, Final Round)
- Hong Kong (Zonal Round)
- India (Zonal Round, Final Round)
- Indonesia (Zonal Round, Final Round)
- Iran (Final Round)
- Iraq (Subzonal Round, Zonal Round)
- Japan (Final Round)
- Jordan (Subzonal Round)
- Kazakhstan (Zonal Round, Final Round)
- Kuwait (Subzonal Round, Zonal Round, Final Round)
- Lebanon (Subzonal Round, Zonal Round)
- Maldives (Zonal Round)
- Myanmar (Zonal Round)
- New Zealand (Final Round)
- Pakistan (Zonal Round, Final Round)
- Qatar (Subzonal Round, Zonal Round, Final Round)
- Saudi Arabia (Subzonal Round, Zonal Round, Final Round)
- South Korea (Final Round)
- Sri Lanka (Zonal Round)
- Syria (Subzonal Round)
- Thailand (Zonal Round, Final Round)
- United Arab Emirates (Subzonal Round)
- Uzbekistan (Zonal Round)
- Vietnam (Zonal Round)

=== CAVB ===
- Algeria (Subzonal Round, Zonal Round, Final Round)
- Botswana (Subzonal Round, Zonal Round, Final Round)
- Burkina Faso (Subzonal Round, Zonal Round)
- Burundi (Subzonal Round, Zonal Round)
- Cameroon (Subzonal Round, Zonal Round, Final Round)
- Cape Verde (Subzonal Round, Final Round)
- Chad (Subzonal Round, Zonal Round)
- Congo (Subzonal Round, Zonal Round, Final Round)
- Egypt (Subzonal Round, Zonal Round, Final Round)
- Gabon (Subzonal Round, Zonal Round, Final Round)
- Ghana (Subzonal Round, Zonal Round)
- Ivory Coast (Subzonal Round)
- Kenya (Subzonal Round, Zonal Round, Final Round)
- Lesotho (Subzonal Round, Zonal Round)
- Libya (Subzonal Round)
- Malawi (Subzonal Round)
- Mauritius (Subzonal Round, Zonal Round)
- Morocco (Subzonal Round, Zonal Round)
- Mozambique (Subzonal Round, Zonal Round)
- Namibia (Subzonal Round, Zonal Round)
- Niger (Subzonal Round, Zonal Round, Final Round)
- Nigeria (Subzonal Round, Zonal Round, Final Round)
- Rwanda (Subzonal Round, Zonal Round, Final Round)
- Senegal (Subzonal Round, Zonal Round, Final Round)
- Seychelles (Subzonal Round, Zonal Round, Final Round)
- Sierra Leone (Subzonal Round)
- Eswatini (Subzonal Round)
- Tanzania (Subzonal Round)
- Togo (Subzonal Round)
- Tunisia (Subzonal Round, Zonal Round, Final Round)
- Uganda (Subzonal Round, Zonal Round)
- Zambia (Subzonal Round, Zonal Round, Final Round)
- Zimbabwe (Subzonal Round, Zonal Round)

=== CEV ===
- Albania (2013 European Championship) (First Round)
- Andorra (2013 European Championship)
- Austria (2013 European Championship) (First Round)
- Azerbaijan (First Round)
- Belarus (2013 European Championship) (First Round, Second Round, Third Round)
- Belgium (2013 European Championship) (First Round, Third Round)
- Bosnia and Herzegovina (First Round)
- Bulgaria (2013 European Championship) (Third Round)
- Croatia (2013 European Championship) (First Round, Third Round)
- Cyprus (2013 European Championship) (First Round, Third Round)
- Czech Republic (2013 European Championship) (Third Round)
- Denmark (2013 European Championship) (First Round)
- Estonia (2013 European Championship) (First Round, Third Round)
- Finland (2013 European Championship) (Third Round)
- France (2013 European Championship) (Third Round)
- Germany (2013 European Championship) (Third Round)
- Great Britain (2013 European Championship)
- Greece (2013 European Championship) (First Round, Third Round)
- Hungary (2013 European Championship) (First Round)
- Iceland (First Round)
- Israel (2013 European Championship) (First Round, Second Round)
- Italy (2013 European Championship)
- Latvia (2013 European Championship) (First Round)
- Luxembourg (2013 European Championship) (First Round)
- Macedonia (2013 European Championship) (First Round, Third Round)
- Moldova (First Round)
- Montenegro (2013 European Championship) (First Round)
- Netherlands (2013 European Championship) (First Round, Second Round, Third Round)
- Northern Ireland (First Round)
- Norway (First Round)
- Portugal (2013 European Championship) (Third Round)
- Romania (2013 European Championship) (First Round, Second Round)
- Russia (2013 European Championship)
- San Marino (First Round)
- Scotland (First Round)
- Serbia (2013 European Championship) (Third Round)
- Slovakia (2013 European Championship) (Third Round)
- Slovenia (2013 European Championship) (First Round, Third Round)
- Spain (2013 European Championship) (Third Round)
- Sweden (2013 European Championship) (First Round, Second Round)
- Switzerland (2013 European Championship)
- Turkey (2013 European Championship) (Third Round)
- Ukraine (2013 European Championship) (First Round, Second Round, Third Round)

=== CSV ===
- Argentina (2013 South American Championship)
- Brazil (2013 South American Championship)
- Chile (2013 South American Championship, Qualification Tournament)
- Colombia (2013 South American Championship, Qualification Tournament)
- Paraguay (2013 South American Championship, Qualification Tournament)
- Venezuela (Qualification Tournament)

=== NORCECA ===
- Anguilla (First Round, Second Round)
- Antigua and Barbuda (First Round, Second Round)
- Aruba (First Round, Second Round)
- Bahamas (First Round, Second Round, Third Round)
- Barbados (First Round, Second Round, Third Round)
- Belize (First Round)
- Bermuda (First Round)
- British Virgin Islands (First Round, Second Round)
- Canada (Third Round)
- Cayman Islands (First Round)
- Costa Rica (First Round, Second Round, Third Round, Final Round)
- Cuba (Third Round)
- Curaçao (First Round, Second Round)
- Dominica (First Round, Second Round)
- Dominican Republic (First Round, Second Round, Third Round, Final Round)
- El Salvador (First Round, Second Round)
- Grenada (First Round, Second Round)
- Guadeloupe (First Round, Second Round)
- Guatemala (First Round, Second Round, Third Round, Final Round)
- Haiti (First Round, Second Round, Third Round)
- Honduras (First Round, Second Round, Third Round)
- Jamaica (First Round)
- Martinique (First Round, Second Round)
- Mexico (Third Round)
- Montserrat (First Round)
- Nicaragua (First Round, Second Round)
- Panama (First Round, Second Round, Third Round)
- Puerto Rico (Third Round, Final Round)
- Saint Kitts and Nevis (First Round, Second Round)
- Saint Lucia (First Round, Second Round, Third Round)
- Saint Martin (First Round, Second Round)
- Saint Vincent and the Grenadines (First Round, Second Round)
- Sint Eustatius (First Round)
- Sint Maarten (First Round)
- Suriname (First Round, Second Round, Third Round)
- Trinidad and Tobago (Third Round)
- Turks and Caicos Islands (First Round)
- U.S. Virgin Islands (First Round)
- United States (Third Round)
