= 2014 FIVB Men's Volleyball World Championship qualification (CAVB) =

The CAVB qualification for the 2014 FIVB Men's Volleyball World Championship saw member nations compete for three places at the finals in Poland.

== Draw ==
44 CAVB national teams entered qualification (11 teams later withdrew). The teams were distributed according to their geographical positions.

Subzonal round

Zone 1 (Pool A)	Zone 2 (Pool B)	Zone 2 (Pool C)	Zone 3 (Pool D)
Algeria; Libya; Morocco; Tunisia	Cape Verde; ~~Gambia~~; ~~Guinea~~; Senegal; Sierra Leone	Merged with Pool B	Burkina Faso; Ghana; Ivory Coast; ~~Liberia~~
Zone 3 (Pool E)	Zone 4 (Pool F)	Zone 4 (Pool G)	Zone 5 (Pool H)
~~Benin~~; Niger; Nigeria; Togo	Cameroon; ~~Central African Republic~~; Chad; Congo; ~~DR Congo~~; Gabon	Merged with Pool F	Burundi; Kenya; Tanzania; Uganda
Zone 5 (Pool I)	Zone 6 (Pool J)	Zone 6 (Pool K)	Zone 7 (Pool L)
Egypt; ~~Ethiopia~~; Rwanda; ~~Sudan~~	Botswana; Lesotho; Mozambique; ~~South Africa~~; Eswatini	Malawi; Namibia; Zambia; Zimbabwe	~~Comoros~~; ~~Madagascar~~; Mauritius; Seychelles

Final round

The draw for the final round of competition was held in Cairo on 9 October 2013. The top three FIVB ranked teams Tunisia, Egypt and Cameroon headed the pools.

Pool T	Pool U	Pool V
Cameroon; 1st Zone 1; 1st Zone 3; 1st Zone 5; 2nd Zone 4	Egypt; 1st Zone 6; 1st Zone 2; 2nd Zone 5; 2nd Zone 6	Tunisia; 1st Zone 7; 1st Zone 4; 2nd Zone 2; 2nd Zone 3

== Subzonal round ==
=== Pool A ===
- Venue: Salle Omnisport Mohamed Nasri, Chlef, Algeria
- Dates: 29–31 July 2013
- All times are Central European Time (UTC+01:00).

Pos	Team	Pld	W	L	Pts	SW	SL	SR	SPW	SPL	SPR
1	Tunisia	3	3	0	8	9	3	3.000	294	278	1.058
2	Algeria	3	2	1	6	8	5	1.600	293	268	1.093
3	Morocco	3	1	2	4	6	6	1.000	272	274	0.993
4	Libya	3	0	3	0	0	9	0.000	194	233	0.833

Date	Time		Score		Set 1	Set 2	Set 3	Set 4	Set 5	Total	Report
29 Jul	22:00	Tunisia	3–1	Morocco	25–16	18–25	25–22	33–31		101–94	Result
29 Jul	24:00	Algeria	3–0	Libya	25–20	25–19	25–16			75–55	Result
30 Jul	22:00	Libya	0–3	Tunisia	30–32	18–25	24–26			72–83	Result
30 Jul	24:00	Morocco	2–3	Algeria	20–25	25–20	22–25	25–21	11–15	103–106	Result
31 Jul	22:00	Libya	0–3	Morocco	22–25	22–25	23–25			67–75	Result
31 Jul	24:00	Algeria	2–3	Tunisia	27–29	25–21	25–20	23–25	12–15	112–110	Result

=== Pool B ===
- Venue: Gimnodesportivo Vavá Duarte, Praia, Cape Verde
- Dates: 4–6 July 2013
- All times are Cape Verde Time (UTC−01:00).

Pos	Team	Pld	W	L	Pts	SW	SL	SR	SPW	SPL	SPR
1	Cape Verde	2	2	0	5	6	2	3.000	180	150	1.200
2	Senegal	2	1	1	4	5	3	1.667	182	149	1.221
3	Sierra Leone	2	0	2	0	0	6	0.000	87	150	0.580

Date	Time		Score		Set 1	Set 2	Set 3	Set 4	Set 5	Total	Report
4 Jul	19:30	Sierra Leone	0–3	Cape Verde	11–25	12–25	20–25			43–75	Result
5 Jul	19:30	Senegal	3–0	Sierra Leone	25–16	25–14	25–14			75–44	Result
6 Jul	19:30	Cape Verde	3–2	Senegal	25–20	18–25	20–25	25–22	17–15	105–107	Result

=== Pool D ===
- Venue: Palais des Sports de Ouaga 2000, Ouagadougou, Burkina Faso
- Dates: 24–26 July 2013
- All times are Greenwich Mean Time (UTC±00:00).

Pos	Team	Pld	W	L	Pts	SW	SL	SR	SPW	SPL	SPR
1	Ghana	2	1	1	4	5	3	1.667	174	163	1.067
2	Burkina Faso	2	1	1	3	5	5	1.000	204	210	0.971
3	Ivory Coast	2	1	1	2	3	5	0.600	172	177	0.972

Date	Time		Score		Set 1	Set 2	Set 3	Set 4	Set 5	Total	Report
24 Jul	18:30	Ghana	2–3	Burkina Faso	15–25	25–17	20–25	25–19	14–16	99–102	Result
25 Jul	18:30	Ivory Coast	0–3	Ghana	22–25	18–25	21–25			61–75	Result
26 Jul	18:30	Burkina Faso	2–3	Ivory Coast	21–25	25–23	20–25	25–23	11–15	102–111	Result

=== Pool E ===
- Venue: Abuja Indoor Sports Hall, Abuja, Nigeria
- Dates: 23–25 July 2013
- All times are West Africa Time (UTC+01:00).

Pos	Team	Pld	W	L	Pts	SW	SL	SR	SPW	SPL	SPR
1	Nigeria	2	2	0	5	6	2	3.000	182	155	1.174
2	Niger	2	1	1	4	5	3	1.667	176	166	1.060
3	Togo	2	0	2	0	0	6	0.000	113	150	0.753

Date	Time		Score		Set 1	Set 2	Set 3	Set 4	Set 5	Total	Report
23 Jul	19:00	Niger	3–0	Togo	25–18	25–21	25–20			75–59	Result
24 Jul	19:00	Niger	2–3	Nigeria	20–25	25–21	19–25	25–21	12–15	101–107	Result
25 Jul	19:00	Togo	0–3	Nigeria	18–25	21–25	15–25			54–75	Result

=== Pool F ===
- Venue: Palais des Sports de Diguel, N'Djamena, Chad
- Dates: 4–6 July 2013
- All times are West Africa Time (UTC+01:00).

Pos	Team	Pld	W	L	Pts	SW	SL	SR	SPW	SPL	SPR
1	Cameroon	3	3	0	9	9	0	MAX	225	169	1.331
2	Congo	3	2	1	6	6	5	1.200	244	243	1.004
3	Chad	3	1	2	2	4	8	0.500	255	272	0.938
4	Gabon	3	0	3	1	3	9	0.333	237	277	0.856

Date	Time		Score		Set 1	Set 2	Set 3	Set 4	Set 5	Total	Report
4 Jul	14:00	Cameroon	3–0	Gabon	25–12	25–16	25–21			75–49	Result
4 Jul	17:00	Congo	3–1	Chad	26–24	18–25	25–21	25–13		94–83	Result
5 Jul	15:00	Gabon	1–3	Congo	18–25	22–25	25–19	20–25		85–94	Result
5 Jul	17:00	Chad	0–3	Cameroon	23–25	22–25	19–25			64–75	Result
6 Jul	15:00	Cameroon	3–0	Congo	25–20	25–17	25–19			75–56	Result
6 Jul	17:00	Chad	3–2	Gabon	25–19	23–25	25–21	20–25	15–13	108–103	Result

=== Pool H ===
- Venue: MTN Arena, Kampala, Uganda
- Dates: 25–27 July 2013
- All times are East Africa Time (UTC+03:00).

Pos	Team	Pld	W	L	Pts	SW	SL	SR	SPW	SPL	SPR
1	Kenya	3	3	0	9	9	0	MAX	225	149	1.510
2	Uganda	3	2	1	6	6	5	1.200	254	235	1.081
3	Burundi	3	1	2	3	4	6	0.667	205	229	0.895
4	Tanzania	3	0	3	0	1	9	0.111	175	246	0.711

Date	Time		Score		Set 1	Set 2	Set 3	Set 4	Set 5	Total	Report
25 Jul	17:00	Kenya	3–0	Tanzania	25–13	25–21	25–15			75–49	Result
25 Jul	19:30	Burundi	1–3	Uganda	25–23	19–25	11–25	29–31		84–104	Result
26 Jul	17:00	Tanzania	0–3	Burundi	13–25	20–25	17–25			50–75	Result
26 Jul	19:30	Uganda	0–3	Kenya	16–25	22–25	16–25			54–75	Result
27 Jul	17:00	Kenya	3–0	Burundi	25–14	25–15	25–17			75–46	Result
27 Jul	19:30	Uganda	3–1	Tanzania	25–20	25–16	21–25	25–15		96–76	Result

=== Pool I ===
- Venue: Amahoro Indoor Stadium, Kigali, Rwanda
- Dates: 25–26 July 2013
- All times are Central Africa Time (UTC+02:00).

Pos	Team	Pld	W	L	Pts	SW	SL	SR	SPW	SPL	SPR
1	Egypt	2	2	0	6	6	1	6.000	180	165	1.091
2	Rwanda	2	0	2	0	1	6	0.167	165	180	0.917

Date	Time		Score		Set 1	Set 2	Set 3	Set 4	Set 5	Total	Report
25 Jul	19:00	Egypt	3–0	Rwanda	25–23	28–26	31–29			84–78	Result
26 Jul	19:00	Rwanda	1–3	Egypt	25–21	21–25	23–25	18–25		87–96	Result

=== Pool J ===
- Venue: Pavilhão da Munhuana, Maputo, Mozambique
- Dates: 3–6 July 2013
- All times are Central Africa Time (UTC+02:00).

Pos	Team	Pld	W	L	Pts	SW	SL	SR	SPW	SPL	SPR
1	Botswana	3	3	0	9	9	1	9.000	254	180	1.411
2	Mozambique	3	2	1	6	7	4	1.750	248	228	1.088
3	Lesotho	3	1	2	3	4	7	0.571	218	250	0.872
4	Eswatini	3	0	3	0	1	9	0.111	181	243	0.745

Date	Time		Score		Set 1	Set 2	Set 3	Set 4	Set 5	Total	Report
3 Jul	14:00	Botswana	3–0	Eswatini	25–16	25–18	25–14			75–48	Result
3 Jul	20:00	Lesotho	1–3	Mozambique	14–25	17–25	25–19	16–25		72–94	Result
4 Jul	14:00	Botswana	3–0	Lesotho	25–21	25–16	25–16			75–53	Result
4 Jul	20:00	Eswatini	0–3	Mozambique	17–25	18–25	17–25			52–75	Result
6 Jul	14:00	Lesotho	3–1	Eswatini	18–25	25–18	25–20	25–18		93–81	Result
6 Jul	20:00	Mozambique	1–3	Botswana	19–25	15–25	31–29	14–25		79–104	Result

=== Pool K ===
- Venue: African Bible College, Lilongwe, Malawi
- Dates: 23–25 July 2013
- All times are Central Africa Time (UTC+02:00).

Pos	Team	Pld	W	L	Pts	SW	SL	SR	SPW	SPL	SPR
1	Zambia	3	3	0	8	9	2	4.500	256	209	1.225
2	Zimbabwe	3	2	1	7	8	5	1.600	294	256	1.148
3	Namibia	3	1	2	3	4	6	0.667	207	216	0.958
4	Malawi	3	0	3	0	1	9	0.111	174	250	0.696

Date	Time		Score		Set 1	Set 2	Set 3	Set 4	Set 5	Total	Report
23 Jul	18:00	Malawi	1–3	Zimbabwe	11–25	13–25	25–23	25–27		74–100	Result
23 Jul	20:00	Namibia	0–3	Zambia	16–25	21–25	19–25			56–75	Result
24 Jul	14:00	Zimbabwe	2–3	Zambia	25–18	19–25	20–25	25–23	13–15	102–106	Result
24 Jul	16:00	Malawi	0–3	Namibia	15–25	13–25	21–25			49–75	Result
25 Jul	16:00	Namibia	1–3	Zimbabwe	25–14	14–25	11–25	26–28		76–92	Result
25 Jul	18:00	Zambia	3–0	Malawi	25–12	25–19	25–20			75–51	Result

=== Pool L ===
- Venue: Palais des Sports, Victoria, Seychelles
- Dates: 26–27 July 2013
- All times are Seychelles Time (UTC+04:00).

Pos	Team	Pld	W	L	Pts	SW	SL	SR	SPW	SPL	SPR
1	Seychelles	2	2	0	6	6	0	MAX	150	111	1.351
2	Mauritius	2	0	2	0	0	6	0.000	111	150	0.740

Date	Time		Score		Set 1	Set 2	Set 3	Set 4	Set 5	Total	Report
26 Jul	19:00	Seychelles	3–0	Mauritius	25–22	25–13	25–19			75–54	Result
27 Jul	18:00	Mauritius	0–3	Seychelles	20–25	18–25	19–25			57–75	Result

== Zonal round ==
=== Pool M ===
- Venue: Salle Taoufik Bouhima, Radès, Tunisia
- Dates: 20–22 November 2013
- All times are Central European Time (UTC+01:00).

Pos	Team	Pld	W	L	Pts	SW	SL	SR	SPW	SPL	SPR
1	Tunisia	2	2	0	5	6	3	2.000	204	175	1.166
2	Algeria	2	1	1	3	4	3	1.333	162	157	1.032
3	Morocco	2	0	2	1	2	6	0.333	147	181	0.812

Date	Time		Score		Set 1	Set 2	Set 3	Set 4	Set 5	Total	Report
20 Nov	18:00	Morocco	2–3	Tunisia	25–21	14–25	16–25	25–20	8–15	88–106	Result
21 Nov	18:00	Algeria	3–0	Morocco	25–20	25–23	25–16			75–59	Result
22 Nov	18:00	Tunisia	3–1	Algeria	25–15	25–22	21–25	27–25		98–87	Result

=== Pool O ===
- Venue: Académie des Arts Martiaux, Niamey, Niger
- Dates: 24–26 October 2013
- All times are West Africa Time (UTC+01:00).

Pos	Team	Pld	W	L	Pts	SW	SL	SR	SPW	SPL	SPR
1	Nigeria	3	3	0	9	9	1	9.000	253	210	1.205
2	Niger	3	2	1	5	6	6	1.000	254	242	1.050
3	Ghana	3	1	2	4	6	6	1.000	258	242	1.066
4	Burkina Faso	3	0	3	0	1	9	0.111	175	246	0.711

Date	Time		Score		Set 1	Set 2	Set 3	Set 4	Set 5	Total	Report
24 Oct	15:30	Burkina Faso	0–3	Ghana	15–25	21–25	10–25			46–75	Result
24 Oct	17:00	Nigeria	3–0	Niger	25–22	25–21	25–22			75–65	Result
25 Oct	15:30	Ghana	1–3	Nigeria	19–25	25–21	27–29	17–25		88–100	Result
25 Oct	17:00	Niger	3–1	Burkina Faso	27–25	16–25	25–11	25–11		93–72	Result
26 Oct	15:30	Burkina Faso	0–3	Nigeria	26–28	20–25	11–25			57–78	Result
26 Oct	17:00	Ghana	2–3	Niger	22–25	25–17	14–25	25–14	9–15	95–96	Result

=== Pool P ===
- Venue: Centre sportif de Makélékélé, Brazzaville, Congo
- Dates: 7–9 November 2013
- All times are West Africa Time (UTC+01:00).

Pos	Team	Pld	W	L	Pts	SW	SL	SR	SPW	SPL	SPR
1	Cameroon	3	3	0	8	9	3	3.000	280	212	1.321
2	Congo	3	2	1	7	8	3	2.667	240	206	1.165
3	Gabon	3	1	2	2	4	8	0.500	235	283	0.830
4	Chad	3	0	3	1	2	9	0.222	207	261	0.793

Date	Time		Score		Set 1	Set 2	Set 3	Set 4	Set 5	Total	Report
7 Nov	16:00	Cameroon	3–1	Gabon	25–13	25–23	23–25	25–15		98–76	Result
7 Nov	18:00	Chad	0–3	Congo	18–25	12–25	21–25			51–75	Result
8 Nov	16:00	Cameroon	3–0	Chad	25–19	25–10	25–17			75–46	Result
8 Nov	18:00	Gabon	0–3	Congo	23–25	14–25	11–25			48–75	Result
9 Nov	16:00	Chad	2–3	Gabon	25–21	25–22	26–28	22–25	12–15	110–111	Result
9 Nov	18:00	Congo	2–3	Cameroon	26–24	11–25	20–25	25–18	8–15	90–107	Result

=== Pool Q ===
- Venue: Amahoro Indoor Stadium, Kigali, Rwanda
- Dates: 26–30 November 2013
- All times are Central Africa Time (UTC+02:00).

Pos	Team	Pld	W	L	Pts	SW	SL	SR	SPW	SPL	SPR
1	Egypt	4	4	0	11	12	3	4.000	363	286	1.269
2	Rwanda	4	3	1	8	10	5	2.000	344	320	1.075
3	Kenya	4	2	2	8	10	6	1.667	357	351	1.017
4	Uganda	4	1	3	3	3	9	0.333	252	282	0.894
5	Burundi	4	0	4	0	0	12	0.000	229	306	0.748

Date	Time		Score		Set 1	Set 2	Set 3	Set 4	Set 5	Total	Report
26 Nov	16:00	Egypt	3–2	Kenya	23–25	25–20	25–17	19–25	15–13	107–100	Result
26 Nov	18:00	Burundi	0–3	Rwanda	23–25	17–25	13–25			53–75	Result
27 Nov	16:00	Uganda	3–0	Burundi	25–21	25–19	25–17			75–57	Result
27 Nov	18:00	Rwanda	1–3	Egypt	33–31	23–25	14–25	16–25		86–106	Result
28 Nov	16:00	Egypt	3–0	Uganda	25–15	25–22	25–16			75–53	Result
28 Nov	18:00	Kenya	2–3	Rwanda	18–25	20–25	25–21	25–22	13–15	101–108	Result
29 Nov	16:00	Uganda	0–3	Kenya	23–25	23–25	18–25			64–75	Result
29 Nov	18:00	Burundi	0–3	Egypt	16–25	14–25	17–25			47–75	Result
30 Nov	16:00	Kenya	3–0	Burundi	25–23	31–29	25–20			81–72	Result
30 Nov	18:00	Rwanda	3–0	Uganda	25–18	25–23	25–19			75–60	Result

=== Pool R ===
- Venue: Institute of Health Sciences, Molepolole, Botswana
- Dates: 8–12 October 2013
- All times are Central Africa Time (UTC+02:00).

Pos	Team	Pld	W	L	Pts	SW	SL	SR	SPW	SPL	SPR
1	Botswana	5	5	0	15	15	1	15.000	396	279	1.419
2	Zambia	5	3	2	8	9	8	1.125	356	371	0.960
3	Zimbabwe	5	3	2	8	10	9	1.111	405	408	0.993
4	Lesotho	5	2	3	8	10	9	1.111	403	383	1.052
5	Mozambique	5	1	4	3	7	14	0.500	437	478	0.914
6	Namibia	5	1	4	3	3	13	0.231	308	386	0.798

Date	Time		Score		Set 1	Set 2	Set 3	Set 4	Set 5	Total	Report
8 Oct	12:00	Lesotho	2–3	Zimbabwe	25–10	13–25	25–18	23–25	10–15	96–93	Result
8 Oct	16:00	Mozambique	0–3	Botswana	17–25	16–25	18–25			51–75	Result
8 Oct	18:00	Namibia	0–3	Zambia	21–25	18–25	16–25			55–75	Result
9 Oct	13:00	Zimbabwe	3–0	Namibia	25–19	25–18	25–15			75–52	Result
9 Oct	15:30	Botswana	3–0	Lesotho	25–18	25–17	25–19			75–54	Result
9 Oct	18:00	Zambia	3–2	Mozambique	27–25	17–25	19–25	25–18	15–11	103–104	Result
10 Oct	13:00	Zimbabwe	0–3	Zambia	18–25	21–25	23–25			62–75	Result
10 Oct	15:30	Botswana	3–0	Namibia	25–18	25–19	25–18			75–55	Result
10 Oct	18:00	Lesotho	2–3	Mozambique	20–25	25–20	25–22	20–25	13–15	103–107	Result
11 Oct	13:00	Mozambique	1–3	Zimbabwe	18–25	24–26	27–25	20–25		89–101	Result
11 Oct	15:30	Namibia	0–3	Lesotho	10–25	22–25	18–25			50–75	Result
11 Oct	18:00	Zambia	0–3	Botswana	12–25	10–25	23–25			45–75	Result
12 Oct	11:00	Lesotho	3–0	Zambia	25–20	25–19	25–19			75–58	Result
12 Oct	13:30	Mozambique	1–3	Namibia	22–25	18–25	25–21	21–25		86–96	Result
12 Oct	16:00	Botswana	3–1	Zimbabwe	21–25	25–14	25–16	25–19		96–74	Result

=== Pool S ===
- Venue: Gymnase Pandit-Sahadeo, Vacoas-Phoenix, Mauritius
- Dates: 6 October 2013
- All times are Mauritius Time (UTC+04:00).

Pos	Team	Pld	W	L	Pts	SW	SL	SR	SPW	SPL	SPR
1	Seychelles	1	1	0	2	3	2	1.500	111	90	1.233
2	Mauritius	1	0	1	1	2	3	0.667	90	111	0.811

Date	Time		Score		Set 1	Set 2	Set 3	Set 4	Set 5	Total	Report
6 Oct	18:00	Mauritius	2–3	Seychelles	25–23	25–23	15–25	16–25	9–15	90–111	Result

== Final round ==
=== Pool T ===
- Venue: Palais des Sports de Warda, Yaoundé, Cameroon
- Dates: 13–17 February 2014
- All times are West Africa Time (UTC+01:00).

Pos	Team	Pld	W	L	Pts	SW	SL	SR	SPW	SPL	SPR
1	Cameroon	4	3	1	9	10	4	2.500	332	274	1.212
2	Algeria	4	3	1	9	9	4	2.250	308	255	1.208
3	Rwanda	4	3	1	9	9	6	1.500	346	315	1.098
4	Nigeria	4	1	3	3	6	10	0.600	322	361	0.892
5	Gabon	4	0	4	0	2	12	0.167	243	346	0.702

Date	Time		Score		Set 1	Set 2	Set 3	Set 4	Set 5	Total	Report
13 Feb	15:00	Rwanda	0–3	Algeria	23–25	12–25	19–25			54–75	Result
13 Feb	18:00	Nigeria	1–3	Cameroon	11–25	25–22	18–25	19–25		73–97	Result
14 Feb	15:00	Gabon	1–3	Nigeria	25–22	20–25	11–25	16–25		72–97	Result
14 Feb	18:00	Cameroon	1–3	Rwanda	20–25	20–25	25–22	17–25		82–97	Result
15 Feb	15:00	Rwanda	3–1	Gabon	25–15	25–19	24–26	25–17		99–77	Result
15 Feb	18:00	Algeria	0–3	Cameroon	26–28	21–25	15–25			62–78	Result
16 Feb	15:00	Gabon	0–3	Algeria	21–25	21–25	10–25			52–75	Result
16 Feb	18:00	Nigeria	1–3	Rwanda	23–25	16–25	25–21	17–25		81–96	Result
17 Feb	15:00	Algeria	3–1	Nigeria	25–17	25–14	21–25	25–15		96–71	Result
17 Feb	18:00	Cameroon	3–0	Gabon	25–11	25–14	25–17			75–42	Result

=== Pool U ===
- Venue: Safaricom Indoor Arena, Nairobi, Kenya
- Dates: 6–10 February 2014
- All times are East Africa Time (UTC+03:00).

Pos	Team	Pld	W	L	Pts	SW	SL	SR	SPW	SPL	SPR
1	Egypt	4	4	0	12	12	1	12.000	320	219	1.461
2	Kenya	4	3	1	8	10	5	2.000	359	299	1.201
3	Botswana	4	2	2	7	8	7	1.143	328	323	1.015
4	Cape Verde	4	1	3	3	4	10	0.400	283	348	0.813
5	Zambia	4	0	4	0	1	12	0.083	232	333	0.697

Date	Time		Score		Set 1	Set 2	Set 3	Set 4	Set 5	Total	Report
6 Feb	14:00	Zambia	0–3	Botswana	19–25	12–25	11–25			42–75	Result
6 Feb	16:00	Kenya	3–0	Cape Verde	25–14	25–17	25–15			75–46	Result
7 Feb	14:00	Cape Verde	3–1	Zambia	25–21	31–29	27–29	25–21		108–100	Result
7 Feb	16:00	Egypt	3–1	Kenya	25–21	25–22	20–25	25–20		95–88	Result
8 Feb	14:00	Zambia	0–3	Egypt	13–25	15–25	15–25			43–75	Result
8 Feb	16:00	Botswana	3–1	Cape Verde	25–22	23–25	25–17	25–21		98–85	Result
9 Feb	14:00	Egypt	3–0	Botswana	25–16	25–19	25–9			75–44	Result
9 Feb	16:00	Kenya	3–0	Zambia	25–15	25–15	25–17			75–47	Result
10 Feb	14:00	Cape Verde	0–3	Egypt	14–25	14–25	16–25			44–75	Result
10 Feb	16:00	Botswana	2–3	Kenya	28–26	15–25	26–24	25–27	17–19	111–121	Result

=== Pool V ===
- Venue: El Menzah Sports Palace, Tunis, Tunisia
- Dates: 3–7 March 2014
- All times are Central European Time (UTC+01:00).

Pos	Team	Pld	W	L	Pts	SW	SL	SR	SPW	SPL	SPR
1	Tunisia	4	4	0	12	12	0	MAX	300	171	1.754
2	Congo	4	3	1	8	9	5	1.800	309	291	1.062
3	Seychelles	4	2	2	6	6	7	0.857	277	301	0.920
4	Niger	4	1	3	4	5	10	0.500	314	338	0.929
5	Senegal	4	0	4	0	2	12	0.167	240	339	0.708

Date	Time		Score		Set 1	Set 2	Set 3	Set 4	Set 5	Total	Report
3 Mar	16:00	Senegal	1–3	Seychelles	16–25	25–18	22–25	19–25		82–93	Result
3 Mar	18:00	Niger	0–3	Tunisia	16–25	13–25	12–25			41–75	Result
4 Mar	16:00	Congo	3–2	Niger	25–17	35–37	14–25	25–17	15–12	114–108	Result
4 Mar	18:00	Tunisia	3–0	Senegal	25–16	25–7	25–17			75–40	Result
5 Mar	16:00	Senegal	0–3	Congo	16–25	16–25	16–25			48–75	Result
5 Mar	18:00	Seychelles	0–3	Tunisia	19–25	10–25	16–25			45–75	Result
6 Mar	16:00	Congo	3–0	Seychelles	25–21	25–23	25–16			75–60	Result
6 Mar	18:00	Niger	3–1	Senegal	25–19	25–12	21–25	25–14		96–70	Result
7 Mar	14:30	Seychelles	3–0	Niger	28–26	25–19	26–24			79–69	Result
7 Mar	17:00	Tunisia	3–0	Congo	25–11	25–17	25–17			75–45	Result
