= 2014 FIVB Men's Volleyball World Championship qualification (CSV) =

The CSV qualification for the 2014 FIVB Men's Volleyball World Championship saw member nations compete for three places at the finals in Poland. The two best-ranked teams from the 2013 Men's South American Volleyball Championship, plus one team from the qualification tournament qualified for the 2014 World Championship.

== Participating nations ==
7 CSV national teams entered qualification. Uruguay later withdrew.

- Argentina
- Brazil
- Chile
- Colombia
- Paraguay
- ~~Uruguay~~
- Venezuela

== 2013 South American Championship ==
- Venue: Ginásio Poliesportivo Alfredo Barreto, Cabo Frio, Brazil
- Dates: 6–10 August 2013

Rank	Team
1st place, gold medalist(s)	Brazil
2nd place, silver medalist(s)	Argentina
3rd place, bronze medalist(s)	Colombia
4	Chile
5	Paraguay

- The next four teams were supposed to advance to the final qualification tournament but with only three teams remaining Venezuela got another chance to participate in the qualification tournament. Venezuela had a flight problem and couldn't reach Cabo Frio in time for the South American Championship.

== Qualification tournament ==
- Venue: Polideportivo Sur de Envigado, Envigado, Colombia
- Dates: 13–15 September 2013
- All times are Colombia Time (UTC−05:00)

Pos	Team	Pld	W	L	Pts	SW	SL	SR	SPW	SPL	SPR
1	Venezuela	3	3	0	8	9	2	4.500	264	222	1.189
2	Colombia	3	2	1	7	8	4	2.000	280	257	1.089
3	Chile	3	1	2	3	4	6	0.667	230	230	1.000
4	Paraguay	3	0	3	0	0	9	0.000	161	226	0.712

Date	Time		Score		Set 1	Set 2	Set 3	Set 4	Set 5	Total	Report
13 Sep	18:00	Venezuela	3–0	Chile	25–23	25–15	25–23			75–61	Report
13 Sep	20:00	Colombia	3–0	Paraguay	25–17	25–20	25–13			75–50	Report
14 Sep	16:00	Venezuela	3–0	Paraguay	25–16	25–15	25–20			75–51	Report
14 Sep	18:00	Colombia	3–1	Chile	20–25	25–23	25–23	25–22		95–93	Report
15 Sep	10:00	Paraguay	0–3	Chile	18–25	18–25	24–26			60–76	Report
15 Sep	15:30	Colombia	2–3	Venezuela	27–29	26–24	17–25	25–19	15–17	110–114	Report
