= Time in Kuwait =

Time in Kuwait is given by Arabia Standard Time (AST) (UTC+03:00). Kuwait does not currently observe daylight saving time.
