= International School of Curaçao =

Coordinates: 12.1375°N 68.9157°W

- Willemstad, Curaçao

Information
- Established: c. 1970

The International School of Curaçao (ISC) is a K-12, private, co-educational day school located in Emmastad, Willemstad, Curaçao.

The school's medium of instruction is English but also offers courses in Dutch, French and Spanish. ISC has 203 pupils, 56% of them being Curaçaoan whilst the remainder is of international citizenship, namely, Dutch, American, Canadian, Venezuelan and Spanish.

The school also provides special needs services for those with autism and learning disabilities.
