= Turkey men's national under-23 volleyball team =

Turkey U23
- Association: Turkish Volleyball Federation
- Confederation: CEV

Uniforms
Home	Away	Third

FIVB U23 World Championship
- Appearances: 2 (First in 2015)
- Best result: (silver) Silver Medalist : (2015)
- tvf.org.tr

The Turkey men's national under-23 volleyball team represents Turkey in international men's volleyball competitions and friendly matches under age 23. It is governed by the Turkish Volleyball Federation which is a part of the Federation of International Volleyball FIVB and of the European Volleyball Confederation CEV.

== Results ==
=== FIVB U23 World Championship ===
Champions Runners up Third place Fourth place

FIVB U23 World Championship
Year	Round	Position	Pld	W	L	SW	SL	Squad
(Brazil) 2013	Didn't Qualify							
(United Arab Emirates) 2015		Runners-Up						Squad
(Egypt) 2017		9th place						Squad
Total	0 Titles	2/3						

== Team ==
=== Current squad ===
The following is the Turkish roster in the 2017 FIVB Men's U23 World Championship.

Head coach: Ahmet Reşat Arığ

No.	Name	Date of birth	Height	Weight	Spike	Block	2017 club
1	Burhan Zorluer	30 July 1996	1.97 m (6 ft 6 in)	86 kg (190 lb)	350 cm (140 in)	325 cm (128 in)	(Turkey) Ziraat Bankası Ankara
3	Melih Siratca	18 February 1996	1.92 m (6 ft 4 in)	79 kg (174 lb)	335 cm (132 in)	318 cm (125 in)	(Turkey) Galatasaray Istanbul
4	Muhammed Kaya	7 February 1995	1.89 m (6 ft 2 in)	72 kg (159 lb)	335 cm (132 in)	325 cm (128 in)	(Turkey) Arkas İzmir
6	Yasin Aydin (C)	11 July 1995	1.94 m (6 ft 4 in)	78 kg (172 lb)	350 cm (140 in)	337 cm (133 in)	(Turkey) Galatasaray Istanbul
7	Abdullah Cam	30 March 1997	1.95 m (6 ft 5 in)	80 kg (180 lb)	316 cm (124 in)	300 cm (120 in)	(Turkey) Halkbank Ankara
8	Onurcan Cakir	27 September 1995	1.87 m (6 ft 2 in)	80 kg (180 lb)	315 cm (124 in)	295 cm (116 in)	(Turkey) Galatasaray Istanbul
11	Enes Atli	5 November 1996	1.96 m (6 ft 5 in)	85 kg (187 lb)	320 cm (130 in)	310 cm (120 in)	(Turkey) Ziraat Bankası Ankara
12	Selim Demir	2 April 1996	1.85 m (6 ft 1 in)	79 kg (174 lb)	312 cm (123 in)	300 cm (120 in)	(Turkey) Ziraat Bankası Ankara
13	Oguzhan Karasu	16 June 1995	2.00 m (6 ft 7 in)	95 kg (209 lb)	350 cm (140 in)	320 cm (130 in)	(Turkey) Fenerbahçe Istanbul
14	Mehmet Hacioglu	29 March 1995	1.89 m (6 ft 2 in)	78 kg (172 lb)	320 cm (130 in)	305 cm (120 in)	(Turkey) Tofaş Sports Club
17	Dogukan Ulu	30 October 1995	2.01 m (6 ft 7 in)	83 kg (183 lb)	325 cm (128 in)	318 cm (125 in)	(Turkey) Galatasaray Istanbul
19	Ertuğrul Gazi Metin	1 January 1996	2.03 m (6 ft 8 in)	85 kg (187 lb)	330 cm (130 in)	320 cm (130 in)	(Turkey) Galatasaray Istanbul

== See also ==
  - Men's
- Turkey Men's national volleyball team
- Turkey Men's national volleyball team U23
- Turkey Men's national volleyball team U21
- Turkey Men's national volleyball team U19
  - Women's
- Turkey Women's national volleyball team
- Turkey Women's national volleyball team U23
- Turkey Women's national volleyball team U20
- Turkey Women's national volleyball team U18
