= Russia men's national under-23 volleyball team =

Youth volleyball team representing Russia

Russia U23
- Association: Volleyball Federation Of Russia
- Confederation: CEV

Uniforms
| Home | Away | Third |

FIVB U23 World Championship
- Appearances: 3 (First in 2013)
- Best result: (gold) Champions : (2015)
- www.volley.ru (in Russian)

The Russia men's national under-23 volleyball team represents Russia in international men's volleyball competitions and friendly matches under the age 23 and it is ruled by the Russian Volleyball Federation That is an affiliate of International Volleyball Federation FIVB and also a part of European Volleyball Confederation CEV.

In response to the 2022 Russian invasion of Ukraine, the International Volleyball Federation suspended all Russian national teams, clubs, and officials, as well as beach and snow volleyball athletes, from all events. The European Volleyball Confederation (CEV) also banned all Russian national teams, clubs, and officials from participating in European competition, and suspended all members of Russia from their respective functions in CEV organs.

== Results ==
=== FIVB U23 World Championship ===
Champions Runners up Third place Fourth place

FIVB U23 World Championship
| Year | Round | Position | Pld | W | L | SW | SL | Squad |
|---|---|---|---|---|---|---|---|---|
| (Brazil) 2013 | | Third place | | | | | | Squads |
| (United Arab Emirates) 2015 | | Champions | | | | | | Squads |
| (Egypt) 2017 | | Runners-up | | | | | | Squads |
| Total | 1 Title | 3/3 | | | | | | |

== Team ==
=== Current squad ===
The following is the Russian roster in the 2017 FIVB Men's U23 World Championship.

Head coach: Andrey Voronkov

| No. | Name | Date of birth | Height | Weight | Spike | Block | 2017 club |
|---|---|---|---|---|---|---|---|
| 1 | Pavel Pankov (C) | 14 August 1995 | 1.98 m (6 ft 6 in) | 90 kg (200 lb) | 345 cm (136 in) | 330 cm (130 in) | (Russia) Kuzbass Kemerovo |
| 2 | Roman Zhos | 4 January 1995 | 1.97 m (6 ft 6 in) | 86 kg (190 lb) | 330 cm (130 in) | 320 cm (130 in) | (Russia) Lokomotiv Novosibirsk |
| 3 | Sergei Pirainen | 27 February 1996 | 2.03 m (6 ft 8 in) | 91 kg (201 lb) | 350 cm (140 in) | 340 cm (130 in) | (Russia) Zenit Kazan |
| 4 | Kiril Ursov | 13 February 1995 | 1.94 m (6 ft 4 in) | 86 kg (190 lb) | 335 cm (132 in) | 325 cm (128 in) | (Russia) Fakel Novy Urengoy |
| 6 | Aleksei Kononov | 9 April 1997 | 2.05 m (6 ft 9 in) | 93 kg (205 lb) | 350 cm (140 in) | 340 cm (130 in) | (Russia) Gazprom-Stavropol |
| 7 | Denis Chereiskii | 26 January 1995 | 2.04 m (6 ft 8 in) | 92 kg (203 lb) | 350 cm (140 in) | 340 cm (130 in) | (Russia) VC Grozny |
| 9 | Ivan Iakovlev | 17 April 1995 | 2.07 m (6 ft 9 in) | 89 kg (196 lb) | 360 cm (140 in) | 350 cm (140 in) | (Russia) Fakel Novy Urengoy |
| 13 | Aleksei Chanchikov | 30 January 1997 | 1.90 m (6 ft 3 in) | 80 kg (180 lb) | 330 cm (130 in) | 320 cm (130 in) | (Russia) Dinamo Moscow |
| 16 | Anton Semyshev | 22 August 1997 | 2.01 m (6 ft 7 in) | 90 kg (200 lb) | 350 cm (140 in) | 340 cm (130 in) | (Russia) Gazprom-Stavropol |
| 17 | Kirill Klets | 15 March 1998 | 2.02 m (6 ft 8 in) | 92 kg (203 lb) | 340 cm (130 in) | 330 cm (130 in) | (Russia) Lokomotiv Novosibirsk |
| 18 | Denis Bogdan | 13 October 1996 | 2.00 m (6 ft 7 in) | 92 kg (203 lb) | 350 cm (140 in) | 340 cm (130 in) | (Russia) Fakel Novy Urengoy |
| 19 | Fedor Voronkov | 10 December 1995 | 2.07 m (6 ft 9 in) | 85 kg (187 lb) | 350 cm (140 in) | 340 cm (130 in) | (Russia) Nova Novokuybyshevsk |
