= Egypt men's national under-23 volleyball team =

Egyptian National Sports Team

Egypt U-23
- Association: Egyptian Volleyball Federation
- Confederation: CAVB

Uniforms
Home	Away	Third

FIVB U23 World Championship
- Appearances: 3 (First in 2013)
- Best result: 5th place : (2017)

African U23 Championship
- Appearances: 1 (First in 2014)
- Best result: Runners-up (silver) : 2014
- www.fevb.org (in Arabic)

The Egypt men's national under-23 volleyball team (Arabic: منتخب مصر تحت 23 سنة لكرة الطائرة), represents Egypt in international volleyball competitions and friendly matches.

== Results ==
Champions Runners up Third place Fourth place

- Green border color indicates tournament was held on home soil.

=== FIVB U23 World Championship ===
FIVB U23 World Championship
Year	Round	Position	Pld	W	L	SW	SL	Squad
(Brazil) 2013		9th place						Squad
(United Arab Emirates) 2015		9th place						Squad
(Egypt) 2017		5th place						Squad
Total	0 Titles	3/3						

=== Men's U23 African Volleyball Championship ===
African U23 Championship
Year	Round	Position	Pld	W	L	SW	SL	Squad
(Egypt) 2014		Runners-up						Squad
(Algeria) 2017	Didn't Compete							
Total	0 Titles	1/2						

== Team ==
=== Current squad ===
The following is the Egyptian roster in the 2017 FIVB Men's U23 World Championship.

Head coach: Marcos Pinheiro Miranda

No.	Name	Date of birth	Height	Weight	Spike	Block	2017 club
4	Ahmed Saber Mohamed	12 December 1995	1.98 m (6 ft 6 in)	88 kg (194 lb)	305 cm (120 in)	281 cm (111 in)	(Egypt) Al Ahly SC
6	Mohamed Attia	7 September 1995	1.80 m (5 ft 11 in)	74 kg (163 lb)	280 cm (110 in)	265 cm (104 in)	(Egypt) 6th of October SC
7	Hisham Ewais	26 February 1995	1.96 m (6 ft 5 in)	75 kg (165 lb)	346 cm (136 in)	322 cm (127 in)	(Egypt) Aviation Club
9	Ahmed Bekhet	15 October 1995	1.91 m (6 ft 3 in)	80 kg (180 lb)	320 cm (130 in)	301 cm (119 in)	(Egypt) Gezira Sporting Club
11	Mohamed Noureldin	1 July 1995	1.85 m (6 ft 1 in)	76 kg (168 lb)	295 cm (116 in)	275 cm (108 in)	(Egypt) Tala'ea El-Gaish SC
12	Abouelsoud Eid	3 April 1995	1.98 m (6 ft 6 in)	85 kg (187 lb)	308 cm (121 in)	295 cm (116 in)	(Egypt) Petrojet SC
15	Abdelrahman Seoudy	21 August 1997	2.06 m (6 ft 9 in)	100 kg (220 lb)	344 cm (135 in)	332 cm (131 in)	(Egypt) Al Ahly SC
16	Mohamed Seliman	4 January 1995	2.08 m (6 ft 10 in)	90 kg (200 lb)	336 cm (132 in)	322 cm (127 in)	(Egypt) Zamalek SC
17	Saad Ahmed	13 January 1996	1.93 m (6 ft 4 in)	82 kg (181 lb)	315 cm (124 in)	293 cm (115 in)	(Egypt) Zamalek SC
18	Omar Aly	26 July 1997	1.93 m (6 ft 4 in)	88 kg (194 lb)	336 cm (132 in)	319 cm (126 in)	(Egypt) Al Ittihad Alexandria Club
19	Ahmed Deyaa Omar (C)	3 April 1995	1.97 m (6 ft 6 in)	95 kg (209 lb)	307 cm (121 in)	293 cm (115 in)	(Egypt) Alexandria SC
21	Ahmed Ibrahim	23 July 1997	2.05 m (6 ft 9 in)	85 kg (187 lb)	341 cm (134 in)	329 cm (130 in)	(Egypt) Petrojet SC
