= Italy men's national under-23 volleyball team =

Italy
- Association: FIPAV
- Confederation: CEV

Uniforms
Home	Away

FIVB U23 World Championship
- Appearances: 1 (First in 2015)
- Best result: (bronze) Third Place : (2015)

The Italy men's national under-23 volleyball team represents Italy in international men's volleyball competitions and friendly matches under the age 23 and it is ruled by the Italian Volleyball Federation.

== Results ==
=== FIVB U23 World Championship ===
Champions Runners up Third place Fourth place

FIVB U23 World Championship
Year	Round	Position	Pld	W	L	SW	SL	Squad
(Brazil) 2013	Didn't qualify							
(United Arab Emirates) 2015		Third place						Squad
(Egypt) 2017	Withdrew							
Total	0 Titles	1/3						

== Team ==
=== Current squad ===
The following is the Italian roster in the 2015 FIVB Volleyball Men's U23 World Championship.

Head coach: Michele Totire

No.	Name	Date of birth	Height	Weight	Spike	Block	2015 club
1	Alberto Polo	7 September 1995	1.99 m (6 ft 6 in)	76 kg (168 lb)	348 cm (137 in)	318 cm (125 in)	(Italy) Potenza Picena
3	Luca Spirito (C)	30 October 1993	1.96 m (6 ft 5 in)	79 kg (174 lb)	338 cm (133 in)	262 cm (103 in)	(Italy) Pallavolo Molfetta
5	Oreste Cavuto	5 December 1996	1.96 m (6 ft 5 in)	87 kg (192 lb)	353 cm (139 in)	344 cm (135 in)	(Italy) Trentino Volley
6	Giacomo Raffaelli	7 February 1995	1.98 m (6 ft 6 in)	95 kg (209 lb)	338 cm (133 in)	330 cm (130 in)	(Italy) Emma Villas
7	Fabio Balaso	20 October 1995	1.78 m (5 ft 10 in)	73 kg (161 lb)	305 cm (120 in)	280 cm (110 in)	(Italy) Sempre Volley
10	Tiziano Mazzone	22 July 1995	1.98 m (6 ft 6 in)	95 kg (209 lb)	350 cm (140 in)	315 cm (124 in)	(Italy) Trentino Volley
11	Gabriele Nelli	4 December 1993	2.10 m (6 ft 11 in)	100 kg (220 lb)	355 cm (140 in)	320 cm (130 in)	(Italy) Trentino Volley
12	Fabio Ricci	11 July 1994	2.04 m (6 ft 8 in)	96 kg (212 lb)	348 cm (137 in)	272 cm (107 in)	(Italy) CMC Ravenna
14	Sebastiano Milan	6 April 1995	2.04 m (6 ft 8 in)	85 kg (187 lb)	355 cm (140 in)	258 cm (102 in)	(Italy) Sempre Volley
16	Elia Bossi	15 August 1994	2.02 m (6 ft 8 in)	91 kg (201 lb)	343 cm (135 in)	320 cm (130 in)	(Italy) Pallavolo Molfetta
17	Marco Izzo	17 November 1994	1.93 m (6 ft 4 in)	93 kg (205 lb)	337 cm (133 in)	253 cm (100 in)	(Italy) Potenza Picena
19	Luca Borgogno	27 April 1993	1.99 m (6 ft 6 in)	79 kg (174 lb)	356 cm (140 in)	259 cm (102 in)	(Italy) CMC Ravenna
