= 2015 FIVB Volleyball Men's U23 World Championship squads =

This article shows the rosters of all participating teams at the Men's U23 World Championship 2015 in United Arab Emirates.

== Pool A ==
=== Cuba ===
The following is the Cuban roster in the 2015 FIVB Volleyball Men's U23 World Championship.

Head coach: Rodolfo Sanchez

| No. | Name | Date of birth | Height | Weight | Spike | Block | 2015 club |
|---|---|---|---|---|---|---|---|
| 3 | Ricardo Calvo | 2 October 1996 | 1.93 m (6 ft 4 in) | 74 kg (163 lb) | 343 cm (135 in) | 334 cm (131 in) | (Cuba) Villa Clara |
| 5 | Rodolfo Rodriguez | 28 April 1997 | 1.95 m (6 ft 5 in) | 83 kg (183 lb) | 350 cm (140 in) | 345 cm (136 in) | (Cuba) Cienfuegos |
| 6 | Osniel Rendon | 26 October 1996 | 2.02 m (6 ft 8 in) | 90 kg (200 lb) | 350 cm (140 in) | 340 cm (130 in) | (Cuba) Matanzas |
| 7 | Yonder Garcia | 26 February 1993 | 1.83 m (6 ft 0 in) | 78 kg (172 lb) | 325 cm (128 in) | 320 cm (130 in) | (Cuba) Havana |
| 8 | Luis Estrada (C) | 10 March 2000 | 1.99 m (6 ft 6 in) | 90 kg (200 lb) | 350 cm (140 in) | 325 cm (128 in) | (Cuba) Havana |
| 9 | Livan Osoria | 5 February 1994 | 2.01 m (6 ft 7 in) | 96 kg (212 lb) | 345 cm (136 in) | 325 cm (128 in) | Santiago de Cuba |
| 10 | Miguel Gutierrez | 21 February 1997 | 1.97 m (6 ft 6 in) | 86 kg (190 lb) | 340 cm (130 in) | 355 cm (140 in) | (Cuba) Villa Clara |
| 12 | Abrahan Alfonso | 23 February 1995 | 1.97 m (6 ft 6 in) | 72 kg (159 lb) | 343 cm (135 in) | 320 cm (130 in) | (Cuba) Havana |
| 14 | Osmany Uriarte | 4 June 1995 | 1.97 m (6 ft 6 in) | 81 kg (179 lb) | 352 cm (139 in) | 348 cm (137 in) | (Cuba) Sancti Spiritus |
| 16 | Luis Sosa | 18 May 1995 | 1.96 m (6 ft 5 in) | 76 kg (168 lb) | 345 cm (136 in) | 320 cm (130 in) | (Cuba) Havana |
| 20 | Javiel Montes | 12 September 1997 | 2.00 m (6 ft 7 in) | 89 kg (196 lb) | 346 cm (136 in) | 340 cm (130 in) | (Cuba) Mayabeque |

=== Italy ===
The following is the Italian roster in the 2015 FIVB Volleyball Men's U23 World Championship.

Head coach: Michele Totire

| No. | Name | Date of birth | Height | Weight | Spike | Block | 2015 club |
|---|---|---|---|---|---|---|---|
| 1 | Alberto Polo | 7 September 1995 | 1.99 m (6 ft 6 in) | 76 kg (168 lb) | 348 cm (137 in) | 318 cm (125 in) | (Italy) Potenza Picena |
| 3 | Luca Spirito (C) | 30 October 1993 | 1.96 m (6 ft 5 in) | 79 kg (174 lb) | 338 cm (133 in) | 262 cm (103 in) | (Italy) Pallavolo Molfetta |
| 5 | Oreste Cavuto | 5 December 1996 | 1.96 m (6 ft 5 in) | 87 kg (192 lb) | 353 cm (139 in) | 344 cm (135 in) | (Italy) Trentino Volley |
| 6 | Giacomo Raffaelli | 7 February 1995 | 1.98 m (6 ft 6 in) | 95 kg (209 lb) | 338 cm (133 in) | 330 cm (130 in) | (Italy) Emma Villas |
| 7 | Fabio Balaso | 20 October 1995 | 1.78 m (5 ft 10 in) | 73 kg (161 lb) | 305 cm (120 in) | 280 cm (110 in) | (Italy) Sempre Volley |
| 10 | Tiziano Mazzone | 22 July 1995 | 1.98 m (6 ft 6 in) | 95 kg (209 lb) | 350 cm (140 in) | 315 cm (124 in) | (Italy) Trentino Volley |
| 11 | Gabriele Nelli | 4 December 1993 | 2.10 m (6 ft 11 in) | 100 kg (220 lb) | 355 cm (140 in) | 320 cm (130 in) | (Italy) Trentino Volley |
| 12 | Fabio Ricci | 11 July 1994 | 2.04 m (6 ft 8 in) | 96 kg (212 lb) | 348 cm (137 in) | 272 cm (107 in) | (Italy) CMC Ravenna |
| 14 | Sebastiano Milan | 6 April 1995 | 2.04 m (6 ft 8 in) | 85 kg (187 lb) | 355 cm (140 in) | 258 cm (102 in) | (Italy) Sempre Volley |
| 16 | Elia Bossi | 15 August 1994 | 2.02 m (6 ft 8 in) | 91 kg (201 lb) | 343 cm (135 in) | 320 cm (130 in) | (Italy) Pallavolo Molfetta |
| 17 | Marco Izzo | 17 November 1994 | 1.93 m (6 ft 4 in) | 93 kg (205 lb) | 337 cm (133 in) | 253 cm (100 in) | (Italy) Potenza Picena |
| 19 | Luca Borgogno | 27 April 1993 | 1.99 m (6 ft 6 in) | 79 kg (174 lb) | 356 cm (140 in) | 259 cm (102 in) | (Italy) CMC Ravenna |

=== Iran ===
The following is the Iranian roster in the 2015 FIVB Volleyball Men's U23 World Championship.

Head coach: Akbari Peyman

| No. | Name | Date of birth | Height | Weight | Spike | Block | 2015 club |
|---|---|---|---|---|---|---|---|
| 1 | Mohammad Hosseini | 23 August 1994 | 1.94 m (6 ft 4 in) | 83 kg (183 lb) | 320 cm (130 in) | 313 cm (123 in) | (Iran) Saipa |
| 2 | Fardin Ghalehghovand | 20 February 1995 | 1.83 m (6 ft 0 in) | 75 kg (165 lb) | 320 cm (130 in) | 310 cm (120 in) | (Iran) Ardakan Arman |
| 3 | Mohammad Razi | 6 February 1993 | 2.01 m (6 ft 7 in) | 91 kg (201 lb) | 327 cm (129 in) | 320 cm (130 in) | (Iran) Sirjan |
| 4 | Mostafa Bagheri | 7 November 1993 | 1.90 m (6 ft 3 in) | 74 kg (163 lb) | 315 cm (124 in) | 305 cm (120 in) | (Iran) Matin Varamin |
| 5 | Mohammad Fallah | 3 March 1993 | 1.90 m (6 ft 3 in) | 90 kg (200 lb) | 330 cm (130 in) | 310 cm (120 in) | (Iran) Student |
| 7 | Pourya Fayazi (C) | 12 January 1993 | 1.94 m (6 ft 4 in) | 87 kg (192 lb) | 348 cm (137 in) | 326 cm (128 in) | (Iran) Shahrdari Urmia |
| 8 | Rasoul Shahsavari | 21 January 1993 | 1.82 m (6 ft 0 in) | 80 kg (180 lb) | 300 cm (120 in) | 280 cm (110 in) | (Iran) Saipa |
| 9 | Sajad Dehnavi | 2 April 1993 | 1.98 m (6 ft 6 in) | 89 kg (196 lb) | 337 cm (133 in) | 332 cm (131 in) | (Iran) Mizan Mashhad |
| 12 | Saeed Javaheri | 6 June 1995 | 1.92 m (6 ft 4 in) | 78 kg (172 lb) | 365 cm (144 in) | 355 cm (140 in) | (Iran) Saipa |
| 13 | Javad Hosseinabadi | 31 December 1993 | 1.95 m (6 ft 5 in) | 87 kg (192 lb) | 330 cm (130 in) | 310 cm (120 in) | (Iran) Kalleh |
| 15 | Navid Jafarzadeh | 2 March 1994 | 2.02 m (6 ft 8 in) | 105 kg (231 lb) | 340 cm (130 in) | 335 cm (132 in) | (Iran) Tehran |
| 19 | Alireza Nasr | 20 May 1993 | 1.96 m (6 ft 5 in) | 84 kg (185 lb) | 325 cm (128 in) | 305 cm (120 in) | (Iran) Matin Varna |

=== South Korea ===
The following is the Korean roster in the 2015 FIVB Volleyball Men's U23 World Championship.

Head coach: Haechon Hong

| No. | Name | Date of birth | Height | Weight | Spike | Block | 2015 club |
|---|---|---|---|---|---|---|---|
| 2 | Park Jiyun | 4 March 1996 | 1.96 m (6 ft 5 in) | 89 kg (196 lb) | 307 cm (121 in) | 297 cm (117 in) | (South Korea) Namsung High School |
| 3 | Ha Seungwoo | 2 June 1995 | 1.83 m (6 ft 0 in) | 71 kg (157 lb) | 300 cm (120 in) | 290 cm (110 in) | (South Korea) Joongbu University |
| 6 | Kim Sungmin | 12 August 1994 | 1.91 m (6 ft 3 in) | 85 kg (187 lb) | 310 cm (120 in) | 300 cm (120 in) | (South Korea) Inha University |
| 7 | Son Taehun (C) | 15 September 1993 | 1.96 m (6 ft 5 in) | 89 kg (196 lb) | 320 cm (130 in) | 300 cm (120 in) | (South Korea) Josun University |
| 9 | Ham Hyeongjin | 25 June 1995 | 1.87 m (6 ft 2 in) | 71 kg (157 lb) | 300 cm (120 in) | 290 cm (110 in) | (South Korea) Joongbu University |
| 10 | Hwang Dongsun | 11 June 1996 | 1.73 m (5 ft 8 in) | 68 kg (150 lb) | 280 cm (110 in) | 280 cm (110 in) | (South Korea) Gyeongnam National University of Science and Technology |
| 11 | Kim Inhyeok | 14 July 1995 | 1.92 m (6 ft 4 in) | 82 kg (181 lb) | 300 cm (120 in) | 290 cm (110 in) | (South Korea) Gyeongnam National University of Science and Technology |
| 12 | Hwang Kyungmin | 10 April 1996 | 1.94 m (6 ft 4 in) | 81 kg (179 lb) | 301 cm (119 in) | 305 cm (120 in) | (South Korea) Gyonggi University |
| 13 | Lee Jihun | 8 December 1995 | 1.82 m (6 ft 0 in) | 65 kg (143 lb) | 295 cm (116 in) | 285 cm (112 in) | (South Korea) Jungbu University |
| 14 | Jung Jiseok | 10 March 1995 | 1.94 m (6 ft 4 in) | 87 kg (192 lb) | 310 cm (120 in) | 300 cm (120 in) | (South Korea) Korean Airlines |
| 17 | Park Sangjun | 19 February 1995 | 1.98 m (6 ft 6 in) | 87 kg (192 lb) | 300 cm (120 in) | 295 cm (116 in) | (South Korea) Joongbu University |
| 19 | Hwang Taekeui | 12 November 1996 | 1.90 m (6 ft 3 in) | 77 kg (170 lb) | 305 cm (120 in) | 300 cm (120 in) | (South Korea) Sungkyunkwan University |

=== Egypt ===
The following is the Egyptian roster in the 2015 FIVB Volleyball Men's U23 World Championship.

Head coach: Grzegorz Rys

| No. | Name | Date of birth | Height | Weight | Spike | Block | 2015 club |
|---|---|---|---|---|---|---|---|
| 1 | Ahmed Saleh | 10 January 1995 | 2.00 m (6 ft 7 in) | 85 kg (187 lb) | 312 cm (123 in) | 300 cm (120 in) | (Egypt) Al Ahly |
| 2 | Abdelrahman Abouelella | 15 September 1996 | 2.09 m (6 ft 10 in) | 117 kg (258 lb) | 334 cm (131 in) | 320 cm (130 in) | (Egypt) Tayaran |
| 3 | Ashraf Ellakany | 11 May 1995 | 1.92 m (6 ft 4 in) | 75 kg (165 lb) | 315 cm (124 in) | 293 cm (115 in) | (Egypt) Zamalek |
| 7 | Hisham Ewais | 26 February 1995 | 1.94 m (6 ft 4 in) | 69 kg (152 lb) | 333 cm (131 in) | 305 cm (120 in) | (Egypt) Tayaran |
| 9 | Mahmoud Elshaikh | 4 July 1996 | 1.93 m (6 ft 4 in) | 79 kg (174 lb) | 331 cm (130 in) | 322 cm (127 in) | (Egypt) Al Shams |
| 11 | Mohamed Noureldin | 1 July 1995 | 1.85 m (6 ft 1 in) | 76 kg (168 lb) | 305 cm (120 in) | 290 cm (110 in) | (Egypt) Al Ahly |
| 13 | Abouelsoud Eid | 3 April 1995 | 1.98 m (6 ft 6 in) | 85 kg (187 lb) | 308 cm (121 in) | 295 cm (116 in) | (Egypt) Petrojet |
| 14 | Ahmed Omar | 4 March 1995 | 1.96 m (6 ft 5 in) | 93 kg (205 lb) | 326 cm (128 in) | 315 cm (124 in) | (Egypt) Sporting |
| 15 | Ahmed Elashry | 19 July 1995 | 1.90 m (6 ft 3 in) | 74 kg (163 lb) | 314 cm (124 in) | 295 cm (116 in) | (Egypt) Sporting |
| 16 | Mohamed Seliman | 4 January 1995 | 2.08 m (6 ft 10 in) | 90 kg (200 lb) | 336 cm (132 in) | 322 cm (127 in) | (Egypt) Zamalek |
| 17 | Saad Ahmed | 13 January 1996 | 1.93 m (6 ft 4 in) | 82 kg (181 lb) | 315 cm (124 in) | 293 cm (115 in) | (Egypt) Shorta |
| 20 | Ahmed Shafik (C) | 7 December 1994 | 1.90 m (6 ft 3 in) | 97 kg (214 lb) | 349 cm (137 in) | 323 cm (127 in) | (Egypt) Eastern Company |

=== United Arab Emirates ===
The following is the Emirati roster in the 2015 FIVB Volleyball Men's U23 World Championship.

Head coach: Morad Sennoun

| No. | Name | Date of birth | Height | Weight | Spike | Block | 2015 club |
|---|---|---|---|---|---|---|---|
| 3 | Ali Alawadhi | 3 November 1993 | 1.71 m (5 ft 7 in) | 82 kg (181 lb) | 0 cm (0 in) | 0 cm (0 in) | (United Arab Emirates) Al-Nasr |
| 4 | Khalid Aldhuhoori | 13 November 1993 | 1.89 m (6 ft 2 in) | 74 kg (163 lb) | 310 cm (120 in) | 295 cm (116 in) | (United Arab Emirates) Al-Ahli |
| 5 | Adel Alblooshi | 8 March 1995 | 1.84 m (6 ft 0 in) | 89 kg (196 lb) | 320 cm (130 in) | 300 cm (120 in) | (United Arab Emirates) Al-Ain |
| 7 | Mohammed Alsuwaidi | 11 December 1994 | 1.90 m (6 ft 3 in) | 88 kg (194 lb) | 320 cm (130 in) | 310 cm (120 in) | (United Arab Emirates) Al-Shabab |
| 9 | Rashed Alazeezi | 27 January 1994 | 1.84 m (6 ft 0 in) | 89 kg (196 lb) | 315 cm (124 in) | 300 cm (120 in) | (United Arab Emirates) Al-Ain |
| 10 | Mohammad Juma | 7 August 1993 | 1.90 m (6 ft 3 in) | 85 kg (187 lb) | 320 cm (130 in) | 315 cm (124 in) | (United Arab Emirates) Al-Ahli |
| 11 | Majid Alfalasi | 1 November 1993 | 1.71 m (5 ft 7 in) | 56 kg (123 lb) | 0 cm (0 in) | 0 cm (0 in) | (United Arab Emirates) Al-Shabab |
| 12 | Ahmed Al Sayari | 11 January 1994 | 1.85 m (6 ft 1 in) | 105 kg (231 lb) | 300 cm (120 in) | 295 cm (116 in) | (United Arab Emirates) Al-Ain |
| 14 | Rashed Mubark | 6 August 1996 | 1.85 m (6 ft 1 in) | 68 kg (150 lb) | 315 cm (124 in) | 298 cm (117 in) | (United Arab Emirates) Al-Shabab |
| 15 | Saif Mohammad | 8 May 1996 | 1.77 m (5 ft 10 in) | 82 kg (181 lb) | 285 cm (112 in) | 280 cm (110 in) | (United Arab Emirates) Al-Ahli |
| 16 | Abdulla Alsuwaidi (C) | 8 September 1993 | 1.72 m (5 ft 8 in) | 103 kg (227 lb) | 290 cm (110 in) | 288 cm (113 in) | (United Arab Emirates) Ajman |
| 18 | Ahmed Buhabil | 11 March 1994 | 1.89 m (6 ft 2 in) | 85 kg (187 lb) | 300 cm (120 in) | 320 cm (130 in) | (United Arab Emirates) Al-Ahli |

== Pool B ==
=== Russia ===
The following is the Russian roster in the 2015 FIVB Volleyball Men's U23 World Championship.

Head coach: Mikhail Nikolaev

| No. | Name | Date of birth | Height | Weight | Spike | Block | 2015 club |
|---|---|---|---|---|---|---|---|
| 1 | Pavel Pankov | 14 August 1995 | 1.98 m (6 ft 6 in) | 90 kg (200 lb) | 345 cm (136 in) | 330 cm (130 in) | (Russia) Dinamo Moscow |
| 4 | Ivan Demakov | 6 January 1993 | 2.09 m (6 ft 10 in) | 101 kg (223 lb) | 350 cm (140 in) | 330 cm (130 in) | (Russia) Zenit Kazan |
| 7 | Egor Feoktistov (C) | 22 June 1993 | 2.01 m (6 ft 7 in) | 90 kg (200 lb) | 340 cm (130 in) | 330 cm (130 in) | (Russia) Ural Ufa |
| 9 | Ilya Petrushov | 9 August 1994 | 1.82 m (6 ft 0 in) | 75 kg (165 lb) | 310 cm (120 in) | 300 cm (120 in) | (Russia) Lokomotiv Novosibirsk |
| 11 | Ivan Podrebinkin | 3 July 1993 | 2.00 m (6 ft 7 in) | 90 kg (200 lb) | 340 cm (130 in) | 330 cm (130 in) | (Russia) Nova Novokuybyshevsk |
| 13 | Roman Zhos | 4 January 1995 | 1.97 m (6 ft 6 in) | 86 kg (190 lb) | 330 cm (130 in) | 320 cm (130 in) | (Russia) Gazprom-Stavropol |
| 14 | Alexander Kimerov | 11 September 1996 | 2.15 m (7 ft 1 in) | 103 kg (227 lb) | 355 cm (140 in) | 335 cm (132 in) | (Russia) Dinamo Krasnodar |
| 15 | Dmitry Volkov | 25 May 1995 | 2.01 m (6 ft 7 in) | 88 kg (194 lb) | 340 cm (130 in) | 330 cm (130 in) | (Russia) Fakel Novy Urengoy |
| 17 | Maxim Maximenko | 13 November 1994 | 1.89 m (6 ft 2 in) | 88 kg (194 lb) | 320 cm (130 in) | 310 cm (120 in) | (Russia) Fakel Novy Urengoy |
| 18 | Egor Kliuka | 15 June 1995 | 2.03 m (6 ft 8 in) | 93 kg (205 lb) | 360 cm (140 in) | 350 cm (140 in) | (Russia) Fakel Novy Urengoy |
| 19 | Sergei Nikitin | 6 April 1993 | 1.98 m (6 ft 6 in) | 86 kg (190 lb) | 355 cm (140 in) | 330 cm (130 in) | (Russia) Prikame Perm |
| 20 | Sergey Ershov | 19 August 1993 | 2.05 m (6 ft 9 in) | 97 kg (214 lb) | 345 cm (136 in) | 330 cm (130 in) | (Russia) Gazprom-Ugra Surgut |

=== Turkey ===
The following is the Turkish roster in the 2015 FIVB Volleyball Men's U23 World Championship.

Head coach: Emanuele Zanini

| No. | Name | Date of birth | Height | Weight | Spike | Block | 2015 club |
|---|---|---|---|---|---|---|---|
| 2 | Salih Özdemir | 10 September 1993 | 1.90 m (6 ft 3 in) | 84 kg (185 lb) | 310 cm (120 in) | 305 cm (120 in) | (Turkey) İstanbul Büyükşehir Belediyesi |
| 4 | Mehmet Zambak | 28 February 1994 | 1.91 m (6 ft 3 in) | 75 kg (165 lb) | 310 cm (120 in) | 305 cm (120 in) | (Turkey) Galatasaray |
| 5 | Baturalp Güngör (C) | 28 July 1993 | 1.89 m (6 ft 2 in) | 70 kg (150 lb) | 345 cm (136 in) | 330 cm (130 in) | (Turkey) Ziraat Bankası |
| 7 | Vahit Savaş | 7 March 1995 | 2.00 m (6 ft 7 in) | 87 kg (192 lb) | 332 cm (131 in) | 318 cm (125 in) | (Turkey) Ziraat Bankası |
| 10 | Gökhan Gökgöz | 6 January 1993 | 2.00 m (6 ft 7 in) | 94 kg (207 lb) | 345 cm (136 in) | 327 cm (129 in) | (Turkey) Arkas |
| 11 | Emre Şenol | 1 January 1993 | 2.01 m (6 ft 7 in) | 80 kg (180 lb) | 330 cm (130 in) | 310 cm (120 in) | (Turkey) İstanbul Büyükşehir Belediyesi |
| 13 | Yasin Aydın | 11 July 1995 | 1.90 m (6 ft 3 in) | 72 kg (159 lb) | 342 cm (135 in) | 324 cm (128 in) | (Turkey) Galatasaray |
| 14 | Samet Güneş | 27 May 1993 | 2.03 m (6 ft 8 in) | 96 kg (212 lb) | 343 cm (135 in) | 330 cm (130 in) | (Turkey) Halkbank |
| 15 | Metin Toy | 3 May 1994 | 2.02 m (6 ft 8 in) | 95 kg (209 lb) | 348 cm (137 in) | 328 cm (129 in) | (Turkey) Fenerbahçe |
| 16 | Murat Yenipazar | 1 January 1993 | 1.93 m (6 ft 4 in) | 74 kg (163 lb) | 339 cm (133 in) | 322 cm (127 in) | (Turkey) İstanbul Büyükşehir Belediyesi |
| 18 | Alperay Demirciler | 1 February 1993 | 1.78 m (5 ft 10 in) | 72 kg (159 lb) | 275 cm (108 in) | 263 cm (104 in) | (Turkey) Ziraat Bankası |
| 20 | Uğur Güneş | 11 August 1993 | 2.04 m (6 ft 8 in) | 80 kg (180 lb) | 330 cm (130 in) | 315 cm (124 in) | (Turkey) Fenerbahçe |

=== Brazil ===
The following is the Brazilian roster in the 2015 FIVB Volleyball Men's U23 World Championship.

Head coach: Roberley Leonaldo

| No. | Name | Date of birth | Height | Weight | Spike | Block | 2015 club |
|---|---|---|---|---|---|---|---|
| 1 | Alan Souza | 21 March 1994 | 1.98 m (6 ft 6 in) | 80 kg (180 lb) | 336 cm (132 in) | 320 cm (130 in) | (Brazil) Sada/Cruzeiro |
| 2 | Wagner Silva | 29 April 1993 | 1.96 m (6 ft 5 in) | 93 kg (205 lb) | 335 cm (132 in) | 305 cm (120 in) | (Brazil) Montes Claros Volei |
| 3 | Eder Kock | 4 July 1993 | 2.06 m (6 ft 9 in) | 88 kg (194 lb) | 0 cm (0 in) | 0 cm (0 in) | (Brazil) Sada/Cruzeiro |
| 4 | Rogério Carvalho | 20 February 1995 | 1.66 m (5 ft 5 in) | 66 kg (146 lb) | 0 cm (0 in) | 0 cm (0 in) | (Brazil) Maringá Volei |
| 5 | Leandro Souza | 13 January 1993 | 1.97 m (6 ft 6 in) | 80 kg (180 lb) | 335 cm (132 in) | 320 cm (130 in) | (Brazil) Sesi-SP |
| 6 | Carlos Barreto | 8 August 1994 | 1.99 m (6 ft 6 in) | 81 kg (179 lb) | 0 cm (0 in) | 0 cm (0 in) | (Brazil) Sada/Cruzeiro |
| 7 | Fernando Kreling | 13 January 1996 | 1.85 m (6 ft 1 in) | 90 kg (200 lb) | 319 cm (126 in) | 301 cm (119 in) | (Brazil) Sada/Cruzeiro |
| 8 | Henrique Batagim | 1 August 1993 | 1.96 m (6 ft 5 in) | 98 kg (216 lb) | 334 cm (131 in) | 315 cm (124 in) | (Brazil) Vôlei Canoas |
| 9 | João Ferreira | 17 March 1993 | 1.91 m (6 ft 3 in) | 86 kg (190 lb) | 339 cm (133 in) | 308 cm (121 in) | (Brazil) Minas T.C. |
| 10 | Flavio Gualberto | 22 April 1993 | 1.99 m (6 ft 6 in) | 84 kg (185 lb) | 344 cm (135 in) | 320 cm (130 in) | (Brazil) Minas T.C. |
| 11 | Thiago Veloso (C) | 15 August 1993 | 1.84 m (6 ft 0 in) | 77 kg (170 lb) | 313 cm (123 in) | 294 cm (116 in) | (Brazil) Sesi-SP |
| 12 | Douglas Souza | 20 August 1995 | 1.99 m (6 ft 6 in) | 75 kg (165 lb) | 338 cm (133 in) | 317 cm (125 in) | (Brazil) Sesi-SP |

=== Argentina ===
The following is the Argentinean roster in the 2015 FIVB Volleyball Men's U23 World Championship.

Head coach: Martin Lopez

| No. | Name | Date of birth | Height | Weight | Spike | Block | 2015 club |
|---|---|---|---|---|---|---|---|
| 1 | Pablo Koukartsev | 25 March 1993 | 2.03 m (6 ft 8 in) | 105 kg (231 lb) | 342 cm (135 in) | 322 cm (127 in) | (Argentina) Club Ciudad De Bolívar |
| 2 | Brian Melgarejo | 28 March 1995 | 1.91 m (6 ft 3 in) | 88 kg (194 lb) | 336 cm (132 in) | 316 cm (124 in) | (Argentina) Club Ciudad de Buenos Aires |
| 4 | Joaquin Gallego | 21 November 1996 | 2.02 m (6 ft 8 in) | 102 kg (225 lb) | 339 cm (133 in) | 319 cm (126 in) | (Argentina) Club Ciudad De Bolívar |
| 5 | Ignacio Fernandez | 7 June 1994 | 1.77 m (5 ft 10 in) | 73 kg (161 lb) | 310 cm (120 in) | 300 cm (120 in) | (Argentina) Club Ciudad de Buenos Aires |
| 6 | Edgar Vieira | 8 February 1995 | 2.02 m (6 ft 8 in) | 95 kg (209 lb) | 342 cm (135 in) | 322 cm (127 in) | (Argentina) Club Velez Sarsfield |
| 8 | Gaspar Bitar | 19 November 1995 | 1.83 m (6 ft 0 in) | 72 kg (159 lb) | 328 cm (129 in) | 308 cm (121 in) | (Argentina) Club Italiano |
| 9 | Gonzalo Quiroga (C) | 25 February 1993 | 1.93 m (6 ft 4 in) | 85 kg (187 lb) | 336 cm (132 in) | 316 cm (124 in) | (Italy) Sempre Volley |
| 10 | Nicolás Lazo | 16 April 1995 | 1.92 m (6 ft 4 in) | 90 kg (200 lb) | 339 cm (133 in) | 317 cm (125 in) | (Argentina) UPCN San Juan Volley |
| 12 | Bruno Lima | 4 February 1996 | 1.98 m (6 ft 6 in) | 85 kg (187 lb) | 341 cm (134 in) | 320 cm (130 in) | (Argentina) Club Obras De San Juan |
| 14 | Gaston Fernandez | 4 August 1995 | 2.03 m (6 ft 8 in) | 101 kg (223 lb) | 339 cm (133 in) | 317 cm (125 in) | (Argentina) Club Ciudad de Buenos Aires |
| 16 | German Johansen | 2 September 1995 | 2.00 m (6 ft 7 in) | 79 kg (174 lb) | 354 cm (139 in) | 333 cm (131 in) | (Argentina) Club De Amigos |
| 17 | Matias Sanchez | 20 September 1996 | 1.73 m (5 ft 8 in) | 72 kg (159 lb) | 306 cm (120 in) | 290 cm (110 in) | (Argentina) Club Obras De San Juan |

=== Tunisia ===
The following is the Tunisian roster in the 2015 FIVB Volleyball Men's U23 World Championship.

Head coach: Moncef Belaiba

| No. | Name | Date of birth | Height | Weight | Spike | Block | 2015 club |
|---|---|---|---|---|---|---|---|
| 1 | Tayeb Korbosli | 5 June 1993 | 1.88 m (6 ft 2 in) | 75 kg (165 lb) | 280 cm (110 in) | 270 cm (110 in) | (Tunisia) CO Kelibia |
| 3 | Mohamed Hatira | 27 March 1993 | 1.78 m (5 ft 10 in) | 76 kg (168 lb) | 310 cm (120 in) | 300 cm (120 in) | (Tunisia) ES Tunis |
| 4 | Ahmed Guenichi | 22 January 1993 | 1.92 m (6 ft 4 in) | 72 kg (159 lb) | 300 cm (120 in) | 287 cm (113 in) | (Tunisia) ES Tunis |
| 8 | Wassim Ben Tara | 3 August 1996 | 1.99 m (6 ft 6 in) | 87 kg (192 lb) | 340 cm (130 in) | 320 cm (130 in) | (France) ASUL Lyon Volleyball |
| 9 | Adam Oueslati | 26 August 1993 | 1.94 m (6 ft 4 in) | 73 kg (161 lb) | 300 cm (120 in) | 290 cm (110 in) | (Tunisia) C S H Lif |
| 10 | Elyes Garfi | 8 June 1993 | 2.02 m (6 ft 8 in) | 90 kg (200 lb) | 350 cm (140 in) | 340 cm (130 in) | (Tunisia) ES Tunis |
| 11 | Malek Chekir | 15 January 1993 | 1.90 m (6 ft 3 in) | 82 kg (181 lb) | 325 cm (128 in) | 315 cm (124 in) | (Tunisia) ES Tunis |
| 12 | Mohamed Brahem | 25 June 1993 | 1.96 m (6 ft 5 in) | 79 kg (174 lb) | 305 cm (120 in) | 290 cm (110 in) | (Tunisia) A. S. Haouaria |
| 13 | Wael Mrika | 12 July 1995 | 1.91 m (6 ft 3 in) | 74 kg (163 lb) | 330 cm (130 in) | 305 cm (120 in) | (Tunisia) CO Kelibia |
| 14 | Montasar Ben Brahem | 20 February 1993 | 1.94 m (6 ft 4 in) | 68 kg (150 lb) | 300 cm (120 in) | 280 cm (110 in) | (Tunisia) A. S. Haouaria |
| 15 | Karim Messelmeni | 7 March 1993 | 2.00 m (6 ft 7 in) | 75 kg (165 lb) | 285 cm (112 in) | 280 cm (110 in) | (Tunisia) CO Kelibia |
| 16 | Khaled Ben Slimene (C) | 14 December 1994 | 1.93 m (6 ft 4 in) | 78 kg (172 lb) | 290 cm (110 in) | 285 cm (112 in) | (Tunisia) CO Kelibia |

=== Mexico ===
The following is the Mexican roster in the 2015 FIVB Volleyball Men's U23 World Championship.

Head coach: Juan Vilches

| No. | Name | Date of birth | Height | Weight | Spike | Block | 2015 club |
|---|---|---|---|---|---|---|---|
| 1 | Roberto Rincon | 19 April 1993 | 1.96 m (6 ft 5 in) | 80 kg (180 lb) | 333 cm (131 in) | 300 cm (120 in) | (Mexico) IMSS |
| 2 | Jesus Serrano | 28 December 1994 | 1.89 m (6 ft 2 in) | 85 kg (187 lb) | 330 cm (130 in) | 310 cm (120 in) | (Mexico) Jalisco |
| 3 | Jesus Perales (C) | 22 December 1993 | 1.97 m (6 ft 6 in) | 88 kg (194 lb) | 328 cm (129 in) | 304 cm (120 in) | (Mexico) Halcones |
| 6 | Ridel Garay | 9 June 1997 | 1.94 m (6 ft 4 in) | 74 kg (163 lb) | 326 cm (128 in) | 299 cm (118 in) | (Mexico) Jalisco |
| 9 | Humberto Ceballos | 11 July 1993 | 1.97 m (6 ft 6 in) | 87 kg (192 lb) | 313 cm (123 in) | 286 cm (113 in) | (Mexico) UNAM |
| 11 | Gabriel Martinez | 21 January 1995 | 1.87 m (6 ft 2 in) | 79 kg (174 lb) | 318 cm (125 in) | 289 cm (114 in) | (Mexico) Chihuahua |
| 12 | Jose Martinez | 23 January 1993 | 2.00 m (6 ft 7 in) | 100 kg (220 lb) | 345 cm (136 in) | 334 cm (131 in) | (Mexico) Virtus Guanajuato |
| 14 | Ricardo Araujo | 23 December 1993 | 1.93 m (6 ft 4 in) | 84 kg (185 lb) | 305 cm (120 in) | 287 cm (113 in) | (Mexico) Jalisco |
| 15 | José Mendoza | 31 May 1993 | 1.70 m (5 ft 7 in) | 71 kg (157 lb) | 290 cm (110 in) | 265 cm (104 in) | (Mexico) IMSS |
| 17 | Alejandro Moreno | 6 September 1994 | 1.91 m (6 ft 3 in) | 80 kg (180 lb) | 338 cm (133 in) | 320 cm (130 in) | |
| 19 | Sebastian Castro | 18 October 1996 | 1.90 m (6 ft 3 in) | 82 kg (181 lb) | 316 cm (124 in) | 288 cm (113 in) | (Mexico) Baja California |
| 20 | Julian Duarte | 19 June 1994 | 2.00 m (6 ft 7 in) | 98 kg (216 lb) | 321 cm (126 in) | 302 cm (119 in) | (Mexico) Tigres |

== See also ==
- 2015 FIVB Volleyball Women's U23 World Championship squads
