= Uroš Kovačević =

Serbian volleyball player (born 1993)

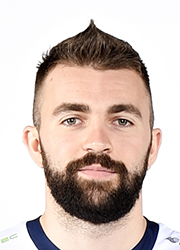

Personal information
- Born: 6 May 1993 (age 33) Kraljevo, Serbia, FR Yugoslavia
- Height: 1.98 m (6 ft 6 in)
- Weight: 94 kg (207 lb)
- Spike: 355 cm (140 in)
- Block: 338 cm (133 in)

Volleyball information
- Position: Outside hitter
- Current club: PAOK Thessaloniki
- Number: 2

Career
- Years: Team
- 2003–2010 2010–2012 2012–2015 2015–2017 2016 2017–2020 2020–2021 2021–2023 2023–2024 2025–: Ribnica Kraljevo; ACH Volley; Modena Volley; Calzedonia Verona; Al Arabi Doha; Trentino Volley; Beijing BAIC Motor; Warta Zawiercie; Ural Ufa; PAOK Thessaloniki

National team
- Years: Team
- 2011–2025: Serbia
Honours
Men's volleyball
Representing Serbia
FIVB World League
Gold medal – first place	2016 Kraków
Silver medal – second place	2015 Rio de Janeiro
CEV European Championship
Gold medal – first place	2011 Austria/Czech Republic
Gold medal – first place	2019 Belgium/France/Netherlands/Slovenia
Bronze medal – third place	2017 Poland

Uroš Kovačević (Serbian Cyrillic: Урош Ковачевић; born 6 May 1993) is a Serbian professional volleyball player who plays as an outside hitter for PAOK Thessaloniki. Kovačević has won 2 European Champion titles (2011, 2019) and the 2016 World League with the Serbia national team.

== Personal life ==
He has two older brothers: Savo and Nikola (born 1983). Nikola is also a professional volleyball player.

=== National team ===
Kovačević is a gold medallist at the 2011 European Championship. In 2011, Kovačević was granted an award by the Olympic Committee of Serbia for the best young athlete. He was a member of the national team at the Olympic Games London 2012. On 19 July 2015, the Serbian national volleyball team reached the World League final, but eventually lost to France (0–3), and obtained silver medals. He was named MVP of the 2019 European Championship where Serbia won a gold medal.

== Honours ==
=== Club ===
- FIVB Club World Championship
  - Poland 2018 – with Trentino Volley
- AVC Asian Club Championship
  - Naypyidaw 2016 – with Al Arabi Doha
- CEV Cup
  - 2018–19 – with Itas Trentino
- CEV Challenge Cup
  - 2015–16 – with Calzedonia Verona
- Domestic
  - 2010–11 Slovenian Cup, with ACH Volley
  - 2010–11 Slovenian Championship, with ACH Volley
  - 2011–12 Slovenian Cup, with ACH Volley
  - 2011–12 Slovenian Championship, with ACH Volley
  - 2014–15 Italian Cup, with Parmareggio Modena
  - 2020–21 Chinese Championship, with Beijing BAIC Motor

=== Youth national team ===
- 2009 CEV U19 European Championship
- 2009 FIVB U19 World Championship
- 2011 CEV U19 European Championship
- 2011 FIVB U19 World Championship
- 2013 FIVB U23 World Championship

=== Individual awards ===
- 2011: CEV U19 European Championship – Most valuable player
- 2011: FIVB U19 World Championship – Most valuable player
- 2011: Award of Olympic Committee of Serbia – Young athlete of the year
- 2013: FIVB U23 World Championship – Best outside spiker
- 2016: AVC Asian Club Championship – Best outside spiker
- 2018: FIVB Club World Championship – Best outside spiker
- 2019: CEV European Championship – Best outside spiker
- 2019: CEV European Championship – Most valuable player
- 2019: CEV – Male volleyball player of the year
- 2019: Male Serbian volleyball player of the year

=== Statistics ===
- 2021–22 PlusLiga – Best spiker (468 points)
- 2022–23 PlusLiga – Best scorer (637 points)
- 2022–23 PlusLiga – Best spiker (557 points)

Awards
Preceded by (Cuba) Wilfredo León (Brazil) Yoandy Leal	Best Outside Spiker of FIVB Club World Championship; 2018 ex aequo (Russia) Dmitry Volkov	Succeeded by (Italy) Osmany Juantorena (Argentina) Facundo Conte
Preceded by (Russia) Maxim Mikhaylov	Most Valuable Player of CEV European Championship; 2019	Succeeded by (Italy) Simone Giannelli
Preceded by (Russia) Dmitry Volkov (Germany) Denis Kaliberda	Best Outside Spiker of CEV European Championship; 2019 ex aequo (Poland) Wilfredo León	Succeeded by (Italy) Alessandro Michieletto (Italy) Daniele Lavia
