= 2017 FIVB Volleyball Men's U23 World Championship squads =

This article shows the rosters of all participating teams at the Men's U23 World Championship 2017 in Cairo, Egypt.

== Pool A ==
=== Brazil ===
The following is the Brazilian roster in the 2017 FIVB Men's U23 World Championship.

Head coach: Giovane Gavio

No.	Name	Date of birth	Height	Weight	Spike	Block	2017 club
1	Leonardo Nascimento	16 March 1995	1.96 m (6 ft 5 in)	77 kg (170 lb)	331 cm (130 in)	311 cm (122 in)	(Brazil) Sada Cruzeiro
2	Felipe Roque	19 May 1997	2.06 m (6 ft 9 in)	99 kg (218 lb)	337 cm (133 in)	317 cm (125 in)	(Brazil) Minas Tênis Clube
4	Rogério Filho	20 February 1995	1.67 m (5 ft 6 in)	69 kg (152 lb)	298 cm (117 in)	260 cm (100 in)	(Brazil) Minas Tênis Clube
5	Fabio Rodrigues	26 July 1995	1.99 m (6 ft 6 in)	78 kg (172 lb)	332 cm (131 in)	315 cm (124 in)	(Brazil) São Bernado Vôlei
8	Eduardo Sobrinho	19 January 1996	1.88 m (6 ft 2 in)	76 kg (168 lb)	330 cm (130 in)	310 cm (120 in)	(Brazil) Minas Tênis Clube
10	Nicolas Santos	17 March 1995	2.03 m (6 ft 8 in)	83 kg (183 lb)	342 cm (135 in)	321 cm (126 in)	(Brazil) Funvic Taubaté
11	Rodrigo Leão	5 June 1996	1.97 m (6 ft 6 in)	85 kg (187 lb)	331 cm (130 in)	316 cm (124 in)	(Brazil) Sada Cruzeiro
12	Douglas Souza	20 August 1995	1.99 m (6 ft 6 in)	75 kg (165 lb)	338 cm (133 in)	317 cm (125 in)	(Brazil) SESI São Paulo
13	Gabriel Candido	18 September 1996	1.96 m (6 ft 5 in)	92 kg (203 lb)	350 cm (140 in)	328 cm (129 in)	(Brazil) São Bernado Vôlei
14	Fernando Kreling (C)	13 January 1996	1.85 m (6 ft 1 in)	85 kg (187 lb)	319 cm (126 in)	301 cm (119 in)	(Brazil) Sada Cruzeiro
20	Romulo Silva	13 March 1995	2.00 m (6 ft 7 in)	79 kg (174 lb)	340 cm (130 in)	321 cm (126 in)	(Brazil) Sada Cruzeiro
21	Matheus Santos	23 April 1996	2.06 m (6 ft 9 in)	96 kg (212 lb)	328 cm (129 in)	309 cm (122 in)	(Brazil) Minas Tênis Clube

=== Cuba ===
The following is the Cuban roster in the 2017 FIVB Men's U23 World Championship.

Head coach: Nicolas Vives

No.	Name	Date of birth	Height	Weight	Spike	Block	2017 club
1	José Israel Masso Alvarez	2 December 1997	1.99 m (6 ft 6 in)	79 kg (174 lb)	349 cm (137 in)	347 cm (137 in)	(Cuba) Guantanamo
2	Osniel Melgarejo	18 December 1997	1.95 m (6 ft 5 in)	83 kg (183 lb)	345 cm (136 in)	320 cm (130 in)	(Cuba) Santic Spiritus
3	Marlon Yang Herrera	23 May 2001	2.02 m (6 ft 8 in)	75 kg (165 lb)	345 cm (136 in)	320 cm (130 in)	(Cuba) Villa Clara
5	Javier Concepcion Rojas	27 December 1997	2.00 m (6 ft 7 in)	84 kg (185 lb)	356 cm (140 in)	350 cm (140 in)	(Cuba) La Habana
6	Alfredo Zequeira Cairo	28 June 1996	1.95 m (6 ft 5 in)	78 kg (172 lb)	352 cm (139 in)	347 cm (137 in)	(Cuba) Villa Clara
10	Miguel Gutierrez Suarez	21 February 1997	1.87 m (6 ft 2 in)	86 kg (190 lb)	355 cm (140 in)	340 cm (130 in)	(Cuba) Villa Clara
11	Livan Taboada Diaz	4 October 1998	1.91 m (6 ft 3 in)	75 kg (165 lb)	343 cm (135 in)	327 cm (129 in)	(Cuba) La Habana
12	Raciel Herrera Cabrera	2 July 1998	1.98 m (6 ft 6 in)	85 kg (187 lb)	345 cm (136 in)	325 cm (128 in)	(Cuba) Pinar Del Rio
14	Adrián Goide (C)	26 June 1998	1.91 m (6 ft 3 in)	80 kg (180 lb)	344 cm (135 in)	340 cm (130 in)	(Cuba) Sancti Spiritus
17	Roamy Alonso Arce	24 July 1997	2.01 m (6 ft 7 in)	93 kg (205 lb)	350 cm (140 in)	330 cm (130 in)	(Cuba) Matanzas
18	Miguel Angel Lopez Castro	25 March 1997	1.89 m (6 ft 2 in)	75 kg (165 lb)	345 cm (136 in)	320 cm (130 in)	(Cuba) Cienfuegos
19	Lionnis Salazar	25 July 1997	1.85 m (6 ft 1 in)	77 kg (170 lb)	332 cm (131 in)	332 cm (131 in)	Santiago de Cuba

=== Egypt ===
The following is the Egyptian roster in the 2017 FIVB Men's U23 World Championship.

Head coach: Marcos Pinheiro Miranda

No.	Name	Date of birth	Height	Weight	Spike	Block	2017 club
4	Ahmed Saber Mohamed	12 December 1995	1.98 m (6 ft 6 in)	88 kg (194 lb)	305 cm (120 in)	281 cm (111 in)	(Egypt) Al Ahly SC
6	Mohamed Attia	7 September 1995	1.80 m (5 ft 11 in)	74 kg (163 lb)	280 cm (110 in)	265 cm (104 in)	(Egypt) 6th of October SC
7	Hisham Ewais	26 February 1995	1.96 m (6 ft 5 in)	75 kg (165 lb)	346 cm (136 in)	322 cm (127 in)	(Egypt) Aviation Club
9	Ahmed Bekhet	15 October 1995	1.91 m (6 ft 3 in)	80 kg (180 lb)	320 cm (130 in)	301 cm (119 in)	(Egypt) Gezira Sporting Club
11	Mohamed Noureldin	1 July 1995	1.85 m (6 ft 1 in)	76 kg (168 lb)	295 cm (116 in)	275 cm (108 in)	(Egypt) Tala'ea El-Gaish SC
12	Abouelsoud Eid	3 April 1995	1.98 m (6 ft 6 in)	85 kg (187 lb)	308 cm (121 in)	295 cm (116 in)	(Egypt) Petrojet SC
15	Abdelrahman Seoudy	21 August 1997	2.06 m (6 ft 9 in)	100 kg (220 lb)	344 cm (135 in)	332 cm (131 in)	(Egypt) Al Ahly SC
16	Mohamed Seliman	4 January 1995	2.08 m (6 ft 10 in)	90 kg (200 lb)	336 cm (132 in)	322 cm (127 in)	(Egypt) Zamalek SC
17	Saad Ahmed	13 January 1996	1.93 m (6 ft 4 in)	82 kg (181 lb)	315 cm (124 in)	293 cm (115 in)	(Egypt) Zamalek SC
18	Omar Aly	26 July 1997	1.93 m (6 ft 4 in)	88 kg (194 lb)	336 cm (132 in)	319 cm (126 in)	(Egypt) Al Ittihad Alexandria Club
19	Ahmed Deyaa Omar (C)	3 April 1995	1.97 m (6 ft 6 in)	95 kg (209 lb)	307 cm (121 in)	293 cm (115 in)	(Egypt) Alexandria SC
21	Ahmed Ibrahim	23 July 1997	2.05 m (6 ft 9 in)	85 kg (187 lb)	341 cm (134 in)	329 cm (130 in)	(Egypt) Petrojet SC

=== Japan ===
The following is the Japanese roster in the 2017 FIVB Men's U23 World Championship.

Head coach: Fumitoshi Tokunaga

No.	Name	Date of birth	Height	Weight	Spike	Block	2017 club
1	Takaya Yamazaki	11 April 1995	1.94 m (6 ft 4 in)	84 kg (185 lb)	330 cm (130 in)	331 cm (130 in)	(Japan) Waseda University
2	Masaki Oya (C)	23 April 1995	1.78 m (5 ft 10 in)	63 kg (139 lb)	318 cm (125 in)	310 cm (120 in)	(Japan) Aichi University
3	Haruki Ono	27 October 1995	1.87 m (6 ft 2 in)	71 kg (157 lb)	340 cm (130 in)	325 cm (128 in)	(Japan) Tokyo Gakugei University
4	Yudai Arai	27 June 1998	1.88 m (6 ft 2 in)	86 kg (190 lb)	345 cm (136 in)	333 cm (131 in)	(Japan) Tokai University
5	Jin Tsuzuki	28 December 1998	1.94 m (6 ft 4 in)	78 kg (172 lb)	340 cm (130 in)	320 cm (130 in)	(Japan) Chuo University
6	Koki Masachika	25 October 1997	1.68 m (5 ft 6 in)	58 kg (128 lb)	292 cm (115 in)	280 cm (110 in)	(Japan) Aichi University
7	Yuki Higuchi	27 April 1996	1.91 m (6 ft 3 in)	74 kg (163 lb)	337 cm (133 in)	315 cm (124 in)	(Japan) University of Tsukuba
8	Masato Katsuoka	3 July 1996	1.82 m (6 ft 0 in)	72 kg (159 lb)	330 cm (130 in)	305 cm (120 in)	(Japan) Osaka Sangyo University
9	Kenji Sato	16 January 1997	1.95 m (6 ft 5 in)	80 kg (180 lb)	330 cm (130 in)	315 cm (124 in)	(Japan) Tokai University
10	Kenta Takanashi	25 March 1997	1.90 m (6 ft 3 in)	77 kg (170 lb)	333 cm (131 in)	312 cm (123 in)	(Japan) Nippon Sport Science University
11	Yuki Suzuki	29 May 1997	2.01 m (6 ft 7 in)	75 kg (165 lb)	340 cm (130 in)	325 cm (128 in)	(Japan) Tokai University
12	Masaki Kaneko	23 October 1997	1.88 m (6 ft 2 in)	70 kg (150 lb)	333 cm (131 in)	320 cm (130 in)	(Japan) JT Thunders Hiroshima

=== Mexico ===
The following is the Mexican roster in the 2017 FIVB Men's U23 World Championship.

Head coach: José Luis Martell

No.	Name	Date of birth	Height	Weight	Spike	Block	2017 club
1	Alan Gabriel Martinez	21 January 1995	1.87 m (6 ft 2 in)	79 kg (174 lb)	318 cm (125 in)	289 cm (114 in)	(Mexico) Chihuahua
2	Miguel Angel Salgado	19 September 1998	1.80 m (5 ft 11 in)	80 kg (180 lb)	320 cm (130 in)	310 cm (120 in)	(Mexico) Chihuahua
3	Ridl Garay Nava (C)	9 June 1997	1.94 m (6 ft 4 in)	74 kg (163 lb)	326 cm (128 in)	299 cm (118 in)	(Mexico) Jalisco
4	Alexis Muñoz Arreola	20 March 1995	1.80 m (5 ft 11 in)	70 kg (150 lb)	320 cm (130 in)	315 cm (124 in)	(Mexico) Chihuahua
6	Ricardo Ortega Vazquez	22 July 1997	1.88 m (6 ft 2 in)	74 kg (163 lb)	326 cm (128 in)	290 cm (110 in)	(Mexico) Guanajuato
7	Alán Cervantes Acosta	8 November 1997	1.95 m (6 ft 5 in)	80 kg (180 lb)	335 cm (132 in)	330 cm (130 in)	(Mexico) Nuevo León
8	Gabriel Cruz Mendoza	23 May 1996	1.96 m (6 ft 5 in)	90 kg (200 lb)	340 cm (130 in)	315 cm (124 in)	(Mexico) Michoacan
10	Emilio Espitia Estrada	3 October 1996	1.82 m (6 ft 0 in)	82 kg (181 lb)	317 cm (125 in)	309 cm (122 in)	(Mexico) Nuevo León
11	Bruno Cruz Ibarra	29 March 1997	1.88 m (6 ft 2 in)	70 kg (150 lb)	332 cm (131 in)	290 cm (110 in)	(Mexico) Baja California
13	Everardo Hernandez	5 April 1995	1.76 m (5 ft 9 in)	65 kg (143 lb)	307 cm (121 in)	281 cm (111 in)	(Mexico) Nuevo León
15	Edson García Vargas	25 October 1996	1.97 m (6 ft 6 in)	105 kg (231 lb)	320 cm (130 in)	310 cm (120 in)	(Mexico) Nuevo León
16	Miguel Chavez	13 May 1996	2.02 m (6 ft 8 in)	73 kg (161 lb)	335 cm (132 in)	293 cm (115 in)	(Mexico) Sonora

=== Poland ===
The following is the Polish roster in the 2017 FIVB Men's U23 World Championship.

Head coach: Dariusz Daszkiewicz

No.	Name	Date of birth	Height	Weight	Spike	Block	2017 club
1	Jan Firlej	26 September 1996	1.87 m (6 ft 2 in)	82 kg (181 lb)	325 cm (128 in)	306 cm (120 in)	(Poland) AZS Politechnika Warszawska
3	Kamil Semeniuk	16 July 1996	1.91 m (6 ft 3 in)	82 kg (181 lb)	350 cm (140 in)	335 cm (132 in)	(Poland) ZAKSA Kędzierzyn-Koźle
4	Marcin Komenda (C)	24 May 1996	1.98 m (6 ft 6 in)	90 kg (200 lb)	335 cm (132 in)	315 cm (124 in)	(Poland) Effector Kielce
5	Paweł Halaba	14 December 1995	1.94 m (6 ft 4 in)	87 kg (192 lb)	354 cm (139 in)	330 cm (130 in)	(Poland) AZS Politechnika Warszawska
6	Dominik Depowski	27 October 1995	2.00 m (6 ft 7 in)	93 kg (205 lb)	345 cm (136 in)	320 cm (130 in)	(Poland) Espadon Szczecin
8	Jakub Zwiech	6 November 1996	2.02 m (6 ft 8 in)	95 kg (209 lb)	340 cm (130 in)	320 cm (130 in)	(Poland) Cerrad Czarni Radom
9	Bartłomiej Lipiński	16 November 1996	2.01 m (6 ft 7 in)	95 kg (209 lb)	350 cm (140 in)	330 cm (130 in)	(Poland) BBTS Bielsko-Biała
12	Konrad Formela	8 March 1995	1.94 m (6 ft 4 in)	86 kg (190 lb)	340 cm (130 in)	330 cm (130 in)	(Poland) Effector Kielce
13	Rafał Szymura	29 August 1995	1.96 m (6 ft 5 in)	93 kg (205 lb)	340 cm (130 in)	310 cm (120 in)	(Poland) AZS Częstochowa
14	Marcin Kania	14 February 1996	2.03 m (6 ft 8 in)	82 kg (181 lb)	352 cm (139 in)	325 cm (128 in)	(Poland) AKS Resovia Rzeszow (U23)
15	Mateusz Czunkiewicz	16 December 1996	1.80 m (5 ft 11 in)	82 kg (181 lb)	327 cm (129 in)	305 cm (120 in)	(Poland) Łuczniczka Bydgoszcz
16	Jarosław Mucha	25 May 1997	2.00 m (6 ft 7 in)	88 kg (194 lb)	340 cm (130 in)	315 cm (124 in)	(Poland) KS Norwid Częstochowa (U23)

== Pool B ==
=== Algeria ===
The following is the Algerian roster in the 2017 FIVB Men's U23 World Championship.

Head coach: Bouhalla Salim

No.	Name	Date of birth	Height	Weight	Spike	Block	2017 club
1	Okba Elhadj Abdellah	5 March 1997	1.96 m (6 ft 5 in)	75 kg (165 lb)	330 cm (130 in)	320 cm (130 in)	(Algeria) CRB Chlef
3	Abderaouf Hamimes (C)	28 October 1996	1.89 m (6 ft 2 in)	72 kg (159 lb)	326 cm (128 in)	319 cm (126 in)	(Algeria) NRBBA Volley-Ball
4	Bouadi Ishaq	2 March 1996	1.94 m (6 ft 4 in)	78 kg (172 lb)	325 cm (128 in)	310 cm (120 in)	(Algeria) EF Ain Azel
5	Fateh Boudrama	7 February 1996	1.94 m (6 ft 4 in)	85 kg (187 lb)	331 cm (130 in)	322 cm (127 in)	(Algeria) ES Setif
8	Boudjemaa Ikken	20 January 1996	1.96 m (6 ft 5 in)	82 kg (181 lb)	335 cm (132 in)	330 cm (130 in)	(Algeria) EF Ain Azal
9	Akram Dekkiche	12 January 1995	1.96 m (6 ft 5 in)	77 kg (170 lb)	333 cm (131 in)	308 cm (121 in)	(Algeria) GS Pétroliers
10	Walid Mebarki	11 December 1997	1.89 m (6 ft 2 in)	76 kg (168 lb)	325 cm (128 in)	320 cm (130 in)	(Algeria) Mechâal Baladiat Béjaïa
12	Mohamed Malik Boucherifi	22 April 1997	1.94 m (6 ft 4 in)	82 kg (181 lb)	328 cm (129 in)	321 cm (126 in)	(Algeria) WA Tlemcen
14	Yassine Abdellaoui	8 February 1995	1.95 m (6 ft 5 in)	82 kg (181 lb)	320 cm (130 in)	305 cm (120 in)	(Algeria) WA Tlemcen
15	Fares Zitouni	23 October 1997	1.90 m (6 ft 3 in)	78 kg (172 lb)	320 cm (130 in)	310 cm (120 in)	(Algeria) GS Pétroliers
18	Youssouf Bourouba	11 January 1997	1.96 m (6 ft 5 in)	80 kg (180 lb)	330 cm (130 in)	320 cm (130 in)	(Algeria) ES Setif
20	Abderrahmen Bouzar	29 May 1996	1.92 m (6 ft 4 in)	75 kg (165 lb)	315 cm (124 in)	310 cm (120 in)	(Algeria) PO Chlef

=== Argentina ===
The following is the Argentine roster in the 2017 FIVB Men's U23 World Championship.

Head coach: Camilo Soto

No.	Name	Date of birth	Height	Weight	Spike	Block	2017 club
1	Matias Sanchez	20 September 1996	1.73 m (5 ft 8 in)	67 kg (148 lb)	306 cm (120 in)	290 cm (110 in)	(Argentina) Personal Bolívar
2	Brian Melgarejo	28 March 1995	1.91 m (6 ft 3 in)	93 kg (205 lb)	333 cm (131 in)	317 cm (125 in)	(Argentina) Club Ciudad de Buenos Aires
3	Jan Martinez Franchi	28 January 1998	1.90 m (6 ft 3 in)	85 kg (187 lb)	333 cm (131 in)	316 cm (124 in)	(Argentina) Club Ciudad de Buenos Aires
6	Edgar Vieira	8 February 1995	2.02 m (6 ft 8 in)	94 kg (207 lb)	342 cm (135 in)	323 cm (127 in)	(Argentina) Club Atlético Vélez Sarsfield
7	Ignacio Luengas	28 January 1996	2.00 m (6 ft 7 in)	73 kg (161 lb)	336 cm (132 in)	316 cm (124 in)	(Argentina) Club Atlético Vélez Sarsfield
8	Gaspar Bitar	19 November 1995	1.83 m (6 ft 0 in)	71 kg (157 lb)	326 cm (128 in)	312 cm (123 in)	(Italy) Club Italia
9	Santiago Danani	12 December 1995	1.76 m (5 ft 9 in)	77 kg (170 lb)	324 cm (128 in)	309 cm (122 in)	(Argentina) Club de Amigos
10	Liam Ernesto Arreche	30 December 1997	1.94 m (6 ft 4 in)	92 kg (203 lb)	339 cm (133 in)	320 cm (130 in)	(Argentina) Club de Amigos
11	Gaston Fernandez (C)	4 August 1995	2.03 m (6 ft 8 in)	101 kg (223 lb)	339 cm (133 in)	317 cm (125 in)	(Argentina) Club Ciudad de Buenos Aires
13	Agustín Loser	12 October 1997	1.93 m (6 ft 4 in)	77 kg (170 lb)	335 cm (132 in)	310 cm (120 in)	(Argentina) Club Ciudad de Buenos Aires
15	Andres Arduino	12 June 1995	1.86 m (6 ft 1 in)	83 kg (183 lb)	333 cm (131 in)	315 cm (124 in)	(Argentina) Club Atlético Vélez Sarsfield
16	German Johansen	2 September 1995	2.00 m (6 ft 7 in)	85 kg (187 lb)	351 cm (138 in)	336 cm (132 in)	(Argentina) Club de Amigos

=== China ===
The following is the Chinese roster in the 2017 FIVB Men's U23 World Championship.

Head coach: Ju Genyin

No.	Name	Date of birth	Height	Weight	Spike	Block	2017 club
1	Zhensen Xu (C)	1 September 1996	1.85 m (6 ft 1 in)	80 kg (180 lb)	342 cm (135 in)	333 cm (131 in)	(China) Shanghai
2	Yinlong Hou	23 June 1995	1.83 m (6 ft 0 in)	70 kg (150 lb)	340 cm (130 in)	339 cm (133 in)	(China) Hebei
3	Yuantai Yu	3 December 1997	1.83 m (6 ft 0 in)	75 kg (165 lb)	320 cm (130 in)	310 cm (120 in)	(China) Hebei
5	Hongbin Jiang	16 April 1997	1.91 m (6 ft 3 in)	92 kg (203 lb)	345 cm (136 in)	340 cm (130 in)	(China) Shanghai
6	Zhenyu Xie	30 November 1996	1.95 m (6 ft 5 in)	88 kg (194 lb)	338 cm (133 in)	335 cm (132 in)	(China) Liaonin
8	Liying Zhou	3 September 1997	1.95 m (6 ft 5 in)	95 kg (209 lb)	345 cm (136 in)	340 cm (130 in)	(China) Jiangsu
9	Hang Zhou	12 August 1995	2.03 m (6 ft 8 in)	90 kg (200 lb)	355 cm (140 in)	350 cm (140 in)	(China) Hubei
11	Lijia Xiao	4 February 1997	2.02 m (6 ft 8 in)	100 kg (220 lb)	355 cm (140 in)	350 cm (140 in)	(China) Liaonin
12	Ning Xu	3 June 1996	2.15 m (7 ft 1 in)	130 kg (290 lb)	356 cm (140 in)	350 cm (140 in)	(China) Liaonin
13	Jiacheng Zhi	4 June 1995	1.80 m (5 ft 11 in)	70 kg (150 lb)	325 cm (128 in)	315 cm (124 in)	(China) Shanghai
14	Jiajie Chen	17 September 1995	1.70 m (5 ft 7 in)	70 kg (150 lb)	325 cm (128 in)	310 cm (120 in)	(China) Guangdong
15	Shaobo Wang	20 July 1998	1.95 m (6 ft 5 in)	85 kg (187 lb)	340 cm (130 in)	340 cm (130 in)	(China) Liaonin

=== Iran ===
The following is the Iranian roster in the 2017 FIVB Men's U23 World Championship.

Head coach: Juan Manual Cichello

No.	Name	Date of birth	Height	Weight	Spike	Block	2017 club
1	Rasoul Aghchehli	28 January 1998	2.00 m (6 ft 7 in)	82 kg (181 lb)	340 cm (130 in)	315 cm (124 in)	(Iran) Kalleh Mazandaran VC
3	Esmaeil Mosaferdashliboroun	21 November 1997	1.92 m (6 ft 4 in)	71 kg (157 lb)	310 cm (120 in)	290 cm (110 in)	(Iran) Kalleh Mazandaran VC
4	Hamid Hamoodi	26 June 1995	1.95 m (6 ft 5 in)	83 kg (183 lb)	317 cm (125 in)	305 cm (120 in)	(Iran) Sarmayeh Bank Tehran VC
6	Rahman Taghi Zadeh (C)	26 July 1995	2.05 m (6 ft 9 in)	98 kg (216 lb)	348 cm (137 in)	328 cm (129 in)	(Iran) Parseh Tehran
8	Salim Cheperli	19 December 1996	2.01 m (6 ft 7 in)	80 kg (180 lb)	340 cm (130 in)	330 cm (130 in)	(Iran) Paykan Tehran VC
9	Sahand Allah Verdian	8 December 1995	1.99 m (6 ft 6 in)	88 kg (194 lb)	338 cm (133 in)	312 cm (123 in)	(Iran) Saipa Tehran VC
12	Saeed Javaheri Tavana	6 March 1995	1.92 m (6 ft 4 in)	78 kg (172 lb)	345 cm (136 in)	335 cm (132 in)	(Iran) Saipa Tehran VC
14	Javad Karimisouchelmaei	1 March 1998	2.04 m (6 ft 8 in)	104 kg (229 lb)	330 cm (130 in)	310 cm (120 in)	(Iran) Kalleh Mazandaran VC
15	Aliasghar Mojarad	30 October 1997	2.05 m (6 ft 9 in)	90 kg (200 lb)	330 cm (130 in)	310 cm (120 in)	(Iran) Parseh Tehran
17	Amir Khodaparast	10 August 1995	1.93 m (6 ft 4 in)	88 kg (194 lb)	350 cm (140 in)	340 cm (130 in)	(Iran) Shahrdari Urmia VC
18	Jaber Esmaeilpoor	11 February 1995	2.00 m (6 ft 7 in)	100 kg (220 lb)	335 cm (132 in)	315 cm (124 in)	(Iran) Sazman Omran Sari
19	Esmaeil Talebi Khameneh	9 June 1998	1.90 m (6 ft 3 in)	80 kg (180 lb)	395 cm (156 in)	275 cm (108 in)	(Iran) Kalleh Mazandaran VC

=== Russia ===
The following is the Russian roster in the 2017 FIVB Men's U23 World Championship.

Head coach: Andrey Voronkov

No.	Name	Date of birth	Height	Weight	Spike	Block	2017 club
1	Pavel Pankov (C)	14 August 1995	1.98 m (6 ft 6 in)	90 kg (200 lb)	345 cm (136 in)	330 cm (130 in)	(Russia) Kuzbass Kemerovo
2	Roman Zhos	4 January 1995	1.97 m (6 ft 6 in)	86 kg (190 lb)	330 cm (130 in)	320 cm (130 in)	(Russia) Lokomotiv Novosibirsk
3	Sergei Pirainen	27 February 1996	2.03 m (6 ft 8 in)	91 kg (201 lb)	350 cm (140 in)	340 cm (130 in)	(Russia) Zenit Kazan
4	Kiril Ursov	13 February 1995	1.94 m (6 ft 4 in)	86 kg (190 lb)	335 cm (132 in)	325 cm (128 in)	(Russia) Fakel Novy Urengoy
6	Aleksei Kononov	9 April 1997	2.05 m (6 ft 9 in)	93 kg (205 lb)	350 cm (140 in)	340 cm (130 in)	(Russia) Gazprom-Stavropol
7	Denis Chereiskii	26 January 1995	2.04 m (6 ft 8 in)	92 kg (203 lb)	350 cm (140 in)	340 cm (130 in)	(Russia) VC Grozny
9	Ivan Lakovlev	17 April 1995	2.07 m (6 ft 9 in)	89 kg (196 lb)	360 cm (140 in)	350 cm (140 in)	(Russia) Fakel Novy Urengoy
13	Aleksei Chanchikov	30 January 1997	1.90 m (6 ft 3 in)	80 kg (180 lb)	330 cm (130 in)	320 cm (130 in)	(Russia) Dinamo Moscow
16	Anton Semyshev	22 August 1997	2.01 m (6 ft 7 in)	90 kg (200 lb)	350 cm (140 in)	340 cm (130 in)	(Russia) Gazprom-Stavropol
17	Kirill Klets	15 March 1998	2.02 m (6 ft 8 in)	92 kg (203 lb)	340 cm (130 in)	330 cm (130 in)	(Russia) Lokomotiv Novosibirsk
18	Denis Bogdan	13 October 1996	2.00 m (6 ft 7 in)	92 kg (203 lb)	350 cm (140 in)	340 cm (130 in)	(Russia) Fakel Novy Urengoy
19	Fedor Voronkov	10 December 1995	2.07 m (6 ft 9 in)	85 kg (187 lb)	350 cm (140 in)	340 cm (130 in)	(Russia) Nova Novokuybyshevsk

=== Turkey ===
The following is the Turkish roster in the 2017 FIVB Men's U23 World Championship.

Head coach: Ahmet Reşat Arığ

No.	Name	Date of birth	Height	Weight	Spike	Block	2017 club
1	Burhan Zorluer	30 July 1996	1.97 m (6 ft 6 in)	86 kg (190 lb)	350 cm (140 in)	325 cm (128 in)	(Turkey) Ziraat Bankası Ankara
3	Melih Siratca	18 February 1996	1.92 m (6 ft 4 in)	79 kg (174 lb)	335 cm (132 in)	318 cm (125 in)	(Turkey) Galatasaray Istanbul
4	Muhammed Kaya	7 February 1995	1.89 m (6 ft 2 in)	72 kg (159 lb)	335 cm (132 in)	325 cm (128 in)	(Turkey) Arkas Izmir
6	Yasin Aydin (C)	11 July 1995	1.94 m (6 ft 4 in)	78 kg (172 lb)	350 cm (140 in)	337 cm (133 in)	(Turkey) Galatasaray Istanbul
7	Abdullah Cam	30 March 1997	1.95 m (6 ft 5 in)	80 kg (180 lb)	316 cm (124 in)	300 cm (120 in)	(Turkey) Halkbank Ankara
8	Onurcan Cakir	27 September 1995	1.87 m (6 ft 2 in)	80 kg (180 lb)	315 cm (124 in)	295 cm (116 in)	(Turkey) Galatasaray Istanbul
11	Enes Atli	5 November 1996	1.96 m (6 ft 5 in)	85 kg (187 lb)	320 cm (130 in)	310 cm (120 in)	(Turkey) Ziraat Bankası Ankara
12	Selim Demir	2 April 1996	1.85 m (6 ft 1 in)	79 kg (174 lb)	312 cm (123 in)	300 cm (120 in)	(Turkey) Ziraat Bankası Ankara
13	Oguzhan Karasu	16 June 1995	2.00 m (6 ft 7 in)	95 kg (209 lb)	350 cm (140 in)	320 cm (130 in)	(Turkey) Fenerbahçe Istanbul
14	Mehmet Hacioglu	29 March 1995	1.89 m (6 ft 2 in)	78 kg (172 lb)	320 cm (130 in)	305 cm (120 in)	(Turkey) Tofaş Sports Club
17	Dogukan Ulu	30 October 1995	2.01 m (6 ft 7 in)	83 kg (183 lb)	325 cm (128 in)	318 cm (125 in)	(Turkey) Galatasaray Istanbul
19	Ertuğrul Gazi Metin	1 January 1996	2.03 m (6 ft 8 in)	85 kg (187 lb)	330 cm (130 in)	320 cm (130 in)	(Turkey) Galatasaray Istanbul

== See also ==
- 2017 FIVB Volleyball Women's U23 World Championship squads
