= Ivan Podrebinkin =

Russian volleyball player (born 1993)

Personal information
- Nationality: Russian
- Born: July 3, 1993 (age 33)
- Height: 6 ft 7 in (2.00 m)
- Weight: 198 lb (90 kg)
- Spike: 136 in (345 cm)
- Block: 132 in (335 cm)

Volleyball information
- Position: Opposite
- Current club: (Russia) Belogorie
- Number: 14

Career
Years	Teams
2010–2019; 2019–2022; 2022–	Nova Novokuybyshevsk; Zenit Saint Petersburg; Belogorie

Ivan Sergeyevich Podrebinkin (born July 3, 1993) is a Russian volleyball player, a member of the club Belogorie.

== Sporting achievements ==
=== National team ===
FIVB Men's U23 World Championship:

- 2015
