= Dmitry Volkov (volleyball) =

Russian volleyball player (born 1995)

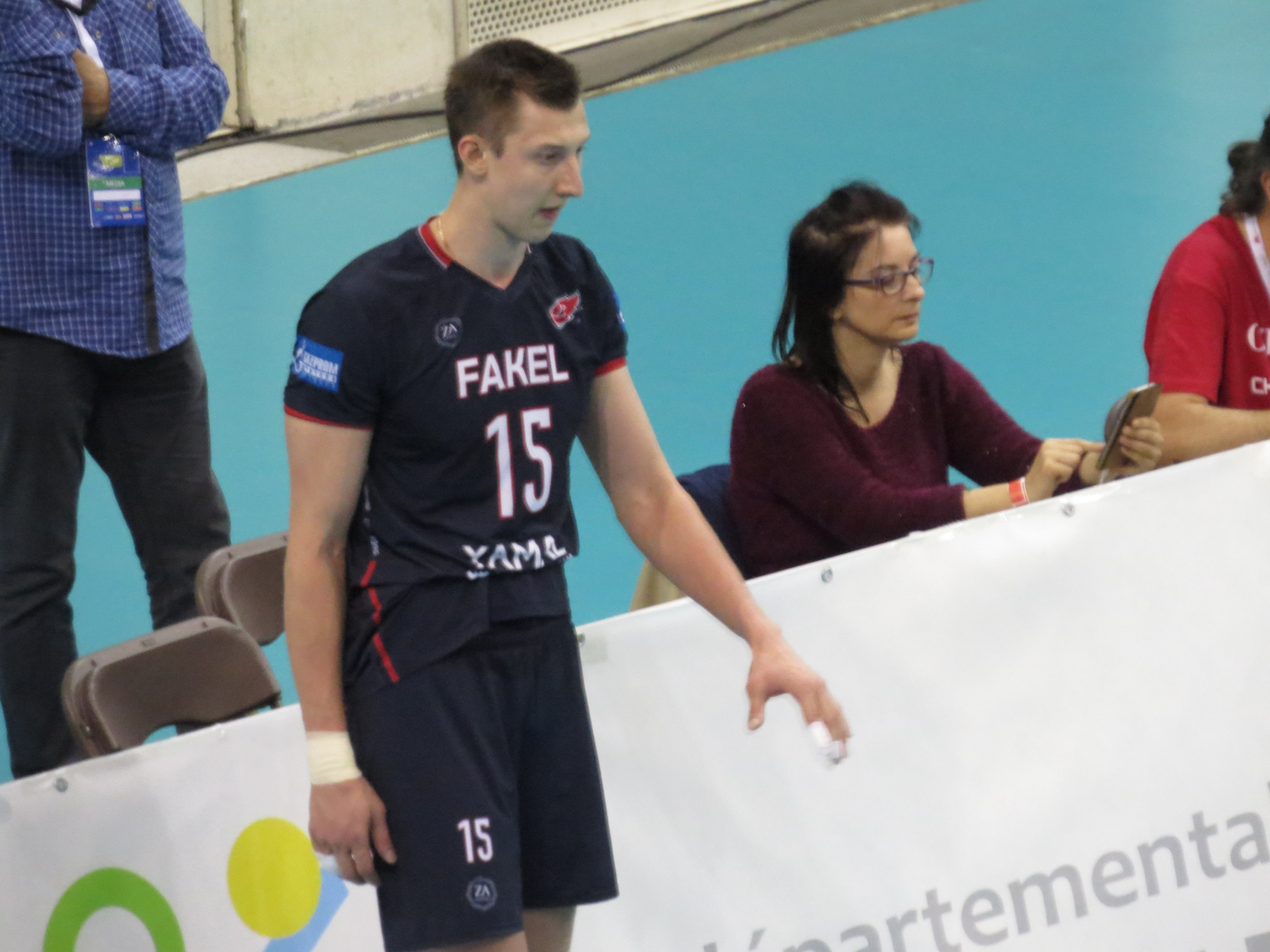
- Volkov in 2017

Personal information
- Full name: Dmitry Aleksandrovich Volkov
- Nationality: (Russia) Russian
- Born: 25 May 1995 (age 31); Novokuybyshevsk, Russia
- Height: 2.01 m (6 ft 7 in)
- Weight: 93 kg (205 lb)
- Spike: 351 cm (138 in)
- Block: 338 cm (133 in)

Volleyball information
- Position: Outside hitter
- Current club: VC Zenit-Kazan
- Number: 15

Career
Years	Teams
2014–2021; 2021–	Fakel Novy Urengoy; VC Zenit-Kazan

National team
2016–	Russia
Honours
Volleyball
Representing ROC
Olympic Games
Silver medal – second place	2020 Tokyo	Team
Representing Russia
FIVB Nations League
Gold medal – first place	2018 Lille	Team
Gold medal – first place	2019 Chicago	Team
European Championship
Gold medal – first place	2017 Poland	Team
European Games
Bronze medal – third place	2015 Azerbaijan	Team
World U23 Championship
Gold medal – first place	2015 United Arab Emirates	Under-23
World U21 Championship
Gold medal – first place	2015 Mexico	Under-21
World U19 Championship
Gold medal – first place	2013 Mexico	Under-19
European Junior Championship
Gold medal – first place	2014 Slovakia/Czech Republic	Under-20
European Youth Summer Olympic Festival
Gold medal – first place	2013 Utrecht	Team

Dmitry Aleksandrovich Volkov (also transliterated Dimitry; Russian: Дмитрий Александрович Волков, IPA: [ˈdmʲitrʲɪj ˈvolkəf]; born 25 May 1995) is a Russian volleyball player. He is part of the Russia men's national volleyball team which competed at the 2016 Summer Olympics. On club level, he plays for Russian club Zenit Kazan.

== Sporting achievements ==
=== Clubs ===
- CEV Challenge Cup
  - 2015/2016 – with Fakel Novy Urengoy
  - 2016/2017 – with Fakel Novy Urengoy

=== Youth national team ===
- 2013 FIVB U19 World Championship
- 2014 CEV U20 European Championship
- 2015 FIVB U23 World Championship
- 2015 FIVB U21 World Championship

=== National team ===
- 2017 CEV European Championship
- 2018 FIVB Nations League
- 2019 FIVB Nations League
- 2021 Olympic Games

=== Individual awards ===
- 2013: FIVB U19 World Championship – Best outside spiker
- 2015: FIVB U21 World Championship – Best outside spiker
- 2017: CEV Challenge Cup – Most valuable player
- 2017: Memorial of Hubert Jerzy Wagner – Best outside spiker
- 2017: CEV European Championship – Best outside spiker
- 2018: FIVB Nations League – Best outside spiker
- 2018: Memorial of Hubert Jerzy Wagner – Best receiver
- 2018: FIVB Club World Championship – Best outside spiker
- 2019: FIVB Nations League – Best outside spiker

Awards
Preceded by (Slovenia) Tine Urnaut (France) Earvin N'Gapeth	Best Outside Spiker; CEV European Championship; 2017 ex aequo (Germany) Denys Kaliberda	Succeeded by (Poland) Wilfredo León (Serbia) Uroš Kovačević
Preceded by Not awarded	Best Outside Hitter; FIVB Nations League; 2018 ex aequo (United States) Taylor Sander; 2019 ex aequo (Poland) Bartosz Bednorz ex aequo (Russia) Egor Kliuka	Succeeded by (Brazil) Yoandy Leal (Poland) Michał Kubiak
Preceded by (Brazil) Yoandy Leal (Poland) Wilfredo León	Best Outside Spiker; FIVB Club World Championship; 2018 ex aequo (Serbia) Uroš Kovačević	Succeeded by (Italy) Osmany Juantorena (Argentina) Facundo Conte
