= Filip Stoilović =

Serbian volleyball player (born 1992)

Personal information
- Full name: Filip Stoilović
- Nationality: Serbian
- Born: 11 October 1992 (age 34); Serbia, FR Yugoslavia
- Height: 1.95 m (6 ft 5 in)
- Weight: 89 kg (196 lb)
- Spike: 337 cm (133 in)
- Block: 315 cm (124 in)

Volleyball information
- Position: Outside hitter
- Current club: OK Crvena Zvezda
- Number: 14

Career
Years	Teams
2009–2015; 2015–2016; 2016; 2017; 2017–2018; 2018–2019; 2019–2020; 2020–2023; 2023–2024; 2024–present	OK Crvena Zvezda; Indykpol AZS Olsztyn; MSK Urfa; GFC Ajaccio; VM Zalău; AEK; Foinikas Syros; VK Jihostroj České Budějovice; OK Radnički Kragujevac; OK Crvena Zvezda

National team
Serbia

Filip Stoilović (born 11 October 1992) is a Serbian volleyball player, who plays as an outside hitter for OK Crvena Zvezda and the Serbia men's national volleyball team.

== Career ==
Stoilović's home team is OK Crvena Zvezda (Red Star) Belgrade, where he played for the first team between 2009 and 2015. In 2015, he went to Polish club Indykpol AZS Olsztyn. In January 2017, he signed for French side GFC Ajaccio.

== Sporting achievements ==
=== Clubs ===
==== National championships ====
With OK Crvena Zvezda:

- 2008/2009 Serbian Cup
- 2009/2010 Serbian Championship
- 2010/2011 Serbian Cup
- 2010/2011 Serbian Championship
- 2011/2012 Serbian SuperCup 2011
- 2011/2012 Serbian Championship
- 2012/2013 Serbian SuperCup 2012
- 2012/2013 Serbian Cup
- 2012/2013 Serbian Championship
- 2013/2014 Serbian SuperCup 2013
- 2013/2014 Serbian Cup
- 2013/2014 Serbian Championship
- 2014/2015 Serbian SuperCup 2014
- 2014/2015 Serbian Championship

=== National team ===
- 2013 FIVB U23 World Championship

=== Individually ===
- 2013 FIVB U23 World Championship - Best Outside Spiker
