= Joongbu University =

University in South Korea

Coordinates: 36.192083°N 127.448528°E

- 중부대학교
- Motto: Libertas, Veritas, Creatio 자유, 진리, 창조
- Motto in English: "Liberty, Truth, Creation"
- Type: Private
- Established: 4 March 1983; 43 years ago
- Founders: Lee Young-Soo (이영수)
- Location: Geumsan, South Chungcheong Province (Geumsan Campus); Goyang, Gyeonggi Province (Goyang Campus), South Korea
- Mascot: Pegasus
- Website: www.joongbu.ac.kr

Korean name
- Hangul: 중부대학교
- Hanja: 中部大學校
- RR: Jungbu daehakgyo
- MR: Chungbu taehakkyo

Joongbu University (JU, Korean: 중부대학교; Hanja: 中部大學校) is a private research university established in 1983 with campuses located in Geumsan and Goyang, South Korea.

== History ==
In 1983, the university received approval for the establishment of the Joongbu Educational Foundation. In 1984, it received approval for the establishment of Joongbu Theology School. The school then changed its name to Joongbu Social Industrial School. Dr. Lee Bo-yeon was inaugurated as the chairman of the board in 1990. In 1992, the university received approval to establish Joongbu University. In 1993, the Joongbu Social Industrial School was closed and Joongbu University opened.

=== Establishment ===
In 1994, the student quota for the 1995 school year was adjusted to 890. The school's name was changed to Joongbu University in 1995, and Dr. Lee Gwang-rin was inaugurated as the first president of Joongbu University. The university formed sisterhood ties with Conservatorio di L'Aquila in Italy. The student quota for the 1996 school year was adjusted to 1,180, and teaching programs for five natural sciences departments were approved.

In 1996, the university signed an exchange agreement with the University of Iowa in the U.S. and the University of San Carlos in the Philippines. The student quota for the 1997 school year was adjusted to 1,380. The establishment of the Graduate School of Humanities and Social Sciences and the Graduate School of Industrial Sciences were approved. In 1997, Dr. Jang Byeong-gyu was inaugurated as the second President of Joongbu University, who established and coordinated the Humanities and Social Science Research Institute and Arts & Culture Research Institute as affiliated research institutes and adjusted the student quota for 1998 to 1,680. In 1998, the student quota was adjusted for the 1999 school year to 1,775 students within 9 departments and 45 major programs. In 1999, the university received approval for the establishment of a teaching program. In 2000, Kim Byeong-gon was inaugurated as the chairman of the board and the university received approval for the establishment of the Graduate School of Education.

=== Relocation ===
In 2001, the university signed an exchange agreement with Moscow Tchaikovsky Conservatory and Moscow State Agricultural University in Russia. In 2002 and again in 2003, the student quota of the Cyber Graduate School was increased. In 2003, the university signed an exchange agreement with the Department of Physical Culture and Sports of St. Petersburg State University in Russia, along with St. Petersburg State University of Technology and Design in Russia.

In 2011, the university signed a student exchange and academic research agreement with the Kazakh University of International Relations and World Languages, as well as signed a letter of intent for international student admission with NingCheng DangBang Language School in China. In 2013, Joongbu was selected for the 2013 University Education Capacity Reinforcement Program (Ministry of Education). In 2017, Korea Automotive Tuning Industry Association MOU and selected as Ministry of Education Internationalization Competency Certification University. In 2018, Joongbu was selected as an excellent university by the Ministry of Education.
