= Matheus Santos (volleyball) =

Brazilian volleyball player (born 1996)

Personal information
- Full name: Matheus Bispo dos Santos
- Nickname: Pinta
- Born: 23 April 1996 (age 30); Brasília, Federal District, Brazil
- Height: 2.06 m (6 ft 9 in)
- Weight: 96 kg (212 lb)
- Spike: 328 cm (129 in)
- Block: 309 cm (122 in)

Volleyball information
- Position: Middle blocker
- Current club: Minas Tênis Clube
- Number: 10

Career
| Years | Teams |
|---|---|
| 2018– | Minas Tênis Clube |

National team
| 2019– | Brazil |
Honours
Men's volleyball
Representing Brazil
Pan American Games
| Bronze medal – third place | 2019 Lima | Team |
South American Championship
| Gold medal – first place | 2019 Santiago |
- Last updated: 15 September 2019

Matheus Santos (born 23 April 1996) is a Brazilian indoor volleyball player. He is a current member of the Brazil men's national volleyball team.

== Career ==
He participated at the 2017 FIVB Volleyball Men's U23 World Championship and 2019 FIVB Volleyball Men's World Cup.

== Sporting achievements ==
=== National team ===
- 2018 Pan-American Cup
- 2019 Pan American Games
- 2019 South American Championship

=== Individual ===
- 2017 FIVB U23 World Championship – Best Middle Blocker
