= Alejandro Moreno (volleyball) =

Mexican volleyball player (born 1994)

Personal information
- Nationality: Mexican
- Born: 6 September 1994 (age 32)
- Height: 191 cm (6 ft 3 in)
- Weight: 80 kg (176 lb)
- Spike: 361 cm (142 in)
- Block: 340 cm (134 in)

Volleyball information
- Number: 23 (national team)

Career
Years	Teams
2015	Nuevo Leon

National team
2015	Mexico

Alejandro Moreno (born 6 September 1994) is a Mexican male volleyball player. He is part of the Mexico men's national volleyball team. On club level he plays for Nuevo Leon.
