= Egor Kliuka =

Russian volleyball player (born 1995)

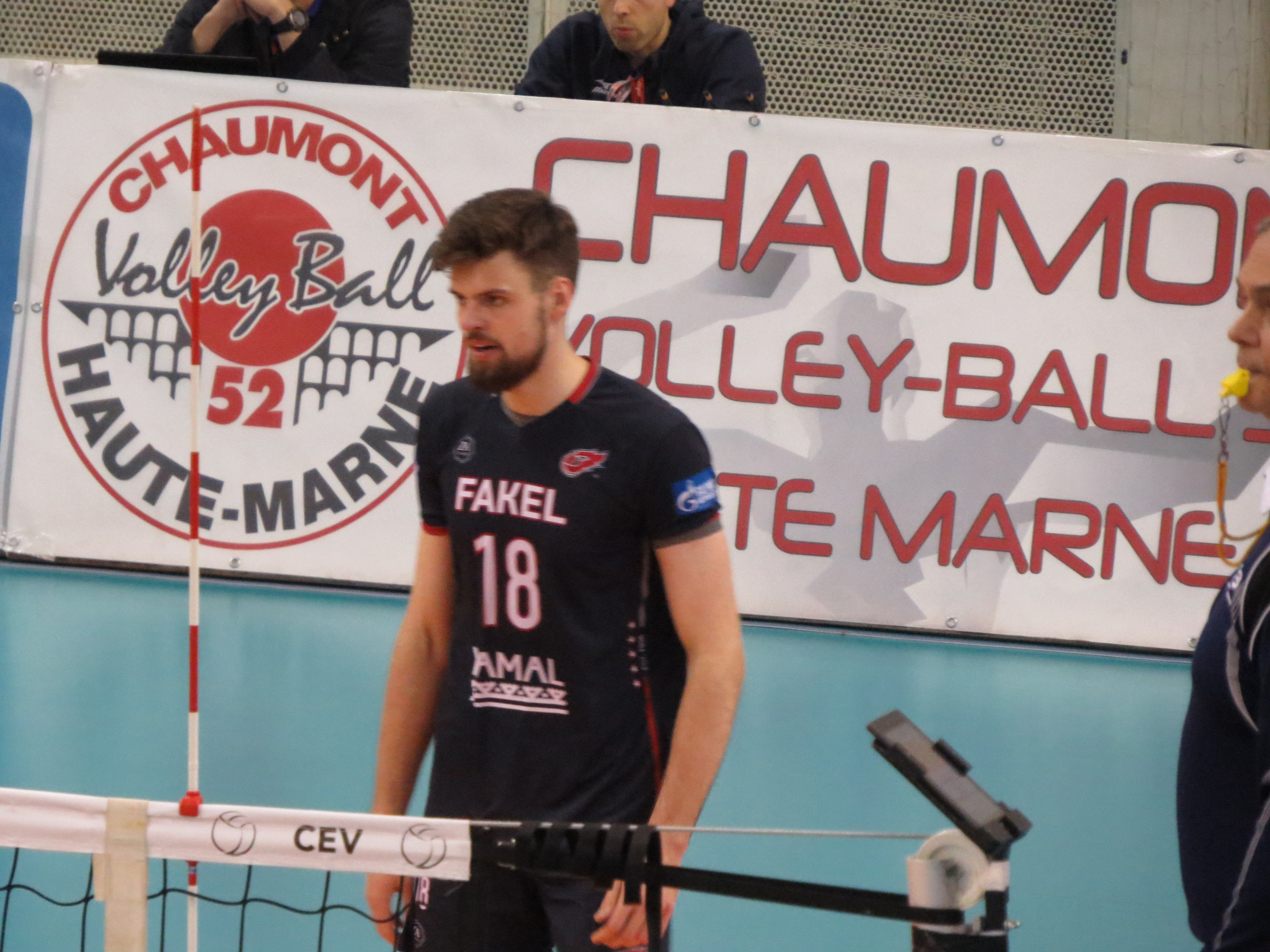
- Kliuka in 2017

Personal information
- Full name: Egor Vasilyevich Kliuka
- Nationality: (Russia) Russian
- Born: 15 June 1995 (age 31); Kobryn, Belarus
- Height: 2.09 m (6 ft 10 in)
- Weight: 96 kg (212 lb)
- Spike: 370 cm (146 in)
- Block: 350 cm (138 in)

Volleyball information
- Position: Outside hitter
- Current club: (Russia) Zenit Saint Petersburg
- Number: 18

Career
Years	Teams
2014–2020; 2020–	(Russia) Fakel Novy Urengoy (Russia) Zenit Saint Petersburg

National team
2015–	Russia
Honours
Representing ROC
Olympic Games
Silver medal – second place	2020 Tokyo	Team
Representing Russia
FIVB Nations League
Gold medal – first place	2018 Lille	Team
Gold medal – first place	2019 Chicago	Team
European Championship
Gold medal – first place	2017 Poland	Team
European Games
Bronze medal – third place	2015 Azerbaijan	Team
Summer Universiade
Gold medal – first place	2015 Gwangju	Team
World U23 Championship
Gold medal – first place	2015 United Arab Emirates	Under-23

Egor Vasilyevich Kliuka (Russian: Егор Васильевич Клюка, lit. 'ɪ̯ɪˈɡor ˈklʲukə') (born 15 June 1995) is a Russian volleyball player of Belarusian descent who plays as an outside hitter for SV League club Suntory Sunbirds Osaka and the Russia men's national volleyball team.

He competed at the 2015 European Championship.

== Sporting achievements ==
=== Clubs ===
- CEV Cup
  - 2020/2021 – with Zenit Saint Petersburg
- CEV Challenge Cup
  - 2015/2016 – with Fakel Novy Urengoy
  - 2016/2017 – with Fakel Novy Urengoy

=== Youth national team ===
- 2015 FIVB U23 World Championship

=== Universiade ===
- 2015 Summer Universiade

=== National team ===
- 2017 CEV European Championship
- 2018 FIVB Nations League
- 2019 FIVB Nations League
- 2020 Olympic Games

=== Individual awards ===
- 2015: FIVB U23 World Championship – Most valuable player
- 2015: FIVB U23 World Championship – Best outside spiker
- 2019: FIVB Nations League – Best outside spiker
- 2020: Olympic Games – Best outside spiker

== See also ==
- Russia at the 2015 European Games

Awards
Preceded by (Brazil) Ricardo Lucarelli Souza (United States) Aaron Russell	Best Outside Spiker of Olympic Games; Tokyo 2020 ex aequo (France) Earvin N'Gapeth	Succeeded by TBD
Preceded by (Russia) Dmitry Volkov (United States) Taylor Sander	Best Outside Hitter; FIVB Nations League; 2019 ex aequo (Russia) Dmitry Volkov ex aequo (Poland) Bartosz Bednorz	Succeeded by (Brazil) Yoandy Leal (Poland) Michał Kubiak
