= FIVB Volleyball Men's U23 World Championship =

Men's juniors volleyball event

- Sport: Volleyball
- Founded: 2013
- Folded: 2019
- No. of teams: 12
- Continent: International (FIVB)
- Last champion: Argentina (1st title)
- Most titles: Argentina; Brazil; Russia (1 title each)

The FIVB Volleyball Men's U23 World Championship was the world championship of volleyball for male players under the age of 23 organized by Fédération Internationale de Volleyball (FIVB).

The first edition was staged in 2013 in Uberlândia, Brazil and tournaments were played every two years until 2017. The last tournament was hosted by Egypt in Cairo and won by Argentina. After not announcing a host for the 2019 edition, FIVB declared that "As per decision of May 2019 FIVB Board of Administration, the U23 WCH has been abolished."

A corresponding tournament for female players was the FIVB Volleyball Women's U23 World Championship.

== Results summary ==
Year	Host	Final			3rd place match			Teams
Year	Host	Champions	Score	Runners-up	3rd place	Score	4th place	Teams
2013; Details	(Brazil); Uberlândia	Brazil	3–2	Serbia	Russia	3–1	Bulgaria	12
2015; Details	(United Arab Emirates); Dubai	Russia	3–1	Turkey	Italy	3–1	Cuba	12
2017; Details	(Egypt); Cairo	Argentina	4–2	Russia	Cuba	4–1	Brazil	12

== Medals summary ==
Rank	Nation	Gold	Silver	Bronze	Total
1	Russia	1	1	1	3
2	Argentina	1	0	0	1
2	Brazil	1	0	0	1
4	Serbia	0	1	0	1
4	Turkey	0	1	0	1
6	Cuba	0	0	1	1
6	Italy	0	0	1	1
Totals (7 entries)		3	3	3	9

== Appearance ==
Team	(Brazil); 2013 (12)	(United Arab Emirates); 2015 (12)	(Egypt); 2017 (12)	Total
Algeria	•	•	11th	1
Argentina	7th	6th	1st	3
Australia	10th	•	•	1
Brazil	1st	5th	4th	3
Bulgaria	4th	•	•	1
China	•	•	8th	1
Cuba	•	4th	3rd	2
Dominican Republic	12th	•	•	1
Egypt	9th	9th	5th	3
Iran	5th	7th	7th	3
Italy	•	3rd	•	1
Japan	•	•	6th	1
Mexico	11th	11th	11th	3
Poland	•	•	9th	1
Russia	3rd	1st	2nd	3
Serbia	2nd	•	•	1
South Korea	•	8th	•	1
Tunisia	8th	9th	•	2
Turkey	•	2nd	9th	2
United Arab Emirates	•	11th	•	1
Venezuela	6th	•	•	1

Legend

- 1st – Champions
- 2nd – Runners-up
- 3rd – Third place
- 4th – Fourth place
- • – Did not enter / Did not qualify
- – Hosts

== Most valuable player by edition ==
- 2013 – Ricardo Lucarelli (BRA)
- 2015 – Egor Kliuka (RUS)
- 2017 – Germán Johansen (ARG)

== See also ==
- FIVB Volleyball Women's U23 World Championship
- FIVB Volleyball Men's World Championship
- FIVB Volleyball Men's U21 World Championship
- FIVB Volleyball Boys' U19 World Championship
