= Gökhan Gökgöz =

Turkish volleyball player (born 1993)

Gokhan Gokgoz

Personal information
- Nationality: Turkish
- Born: 6 January 1993 (age 33)
- Height: 2.00 m (6 ft 7 in)
- Weight: 95 kg (209 lb)
- Spike: 367 cm (144 in)
- Block: 334 cm (131 in)

Volleyball information
- Position: Outside spiker
- Current club: Gebze Belediyespor

Career
Years	Teams
2015–2018; 2018–2019; 2019–2021; 2021–2024; 2024; 2024–2025; 2025; 2025–2026; 2026–	Arkas Spor; İstanbul BBSK; Halkbank; Bursa BBSK; Kudus Sukun Badak; ON Hotels Alanya; Spor Toto; Bursa BBSK; Gebze Belediyespor

National team
2015–	Turkey
Honours
Men's volleyball
Representing Turkey
Islamic Solidarity Games
Bronze medal – third place	2021 Konya	Team

Gokhan Gokgoz (born 6 January 1993) is a Turkish male volleyball player. He was a part of the Turkey men's national volleyball team from 2015 to 2016. On club level, he plays for Gebze Belediyespor. In early 2017, Gokoz became engaged to his tennis player fiancé, Busra Kayrun.
