= Ahmet Reşat Arığ =

Turkish volleyball coach

Personal information
- Nationality: Turkish
- Born: 5 August 1964 (age 62); Elazığ, Turkey

Volleyball information
- Position: Head coach
- Current club: Maç Sayısı Spor Kulübü

Career
Years
- 2007–2008
- 2008–2011
- 2011–2012
- 2013–2014
- 2014–2016
- 2016–2017
- 2018–2019
- 2020
- 2020–
Teams
- Galatasaray
- Maliye İhtisas
- Galatasaray (Coach assistant)
- Galatasaray
- Şahinbey Belediye
- İdmanocağı SK
- Tokat Belediye Plevnespor
- Solhan Spor Kulübü
- Maç Sayısı Spor Kulübü

Ahmet Reşat Arığ (born 5 August 1964) is a Turkish volleyball coach.
