= 2015 FIVB Volleyball Men's U23 World Championship =

Event held in United Arab Emirates

2015 FIVB Men's U23 World Championship
بطولة العالم للكرة الطائرة للرجال تحت 23 عاما 2015 دولة الإمارات العربية المتحدة

Tournament details
- Host country: United Arab Emirates
- Dates: 24–31 August
- Teams: 12
- Venues: 2 (in 1 host city)

Final positions
- Champions: Russia (1st title)
- Runners-up: Turkey
- Third place: Italy
- Fourth place: Cuba

Tournament awards
- MVP: (Russia) Egor Kliuka
- Best Setter: (Turkey) Murat Yenipazar
- Best OH: (Russia) Egor Kliuka (Turkey) Gökhan Gökgöz
- Best MB: (Russia) Ivan Demakov (Turkey) Samet Güneş
- Best OPP: (Turkey) Metin Toy
- Best Libero: (Cuba) Yonder Garcia

Tournament statistics
- Matches played: 38

The 2015 FIVB Volleyball Men's U23 World Championship was held in Dubai, United Arab Emirates, from 24 to 31 August 2015. This was the second edition of the tournament.

== Competition formula ==
The competition format will see the 12 teams split into two pools of six teams playing in round robin format. The semifinals will feature the top two teams from each pool.

== Qualification ==
The FIVB Sports Events Council confirmed a proposal to streamline the number of teams participating in the Age Group World Championships on 14 December 2013.

Method of Qualification	Date	Venue	Vacancies	Qualified
Host country	11 November 2014	(Switzerland) Lausanne	1	United Arab Emirates
U20 European Ranking	18 September 2014	Luxembourg	2	Russia
U20 European Ranking	18 September 2014	Luxembourg	2	Italy
2014 U23 Pan-American Cup	5–10 October 2014	(Cuba) Havana	2	Cuba
2014 U23 Pan-American Cup	5–10 October 2014	(Cuba) Havana	2	Mexico
2014 U23 South American Championship	8–12 October 2014	(Brazil) Saquarema	2	Brazil
2014 U23 South American Championship	8–12 October 2014	(Brazil) Saquarema	2	Argentina
2014 U23 African Championship	7–12 November 2014	(Egypt) Sharm El Sheikh	2	Tunisia
2014 U23 African Championship	7–12 November 2014	(Egypt) Sharm El Sheikh	2	Egypt
2015 Asian U23 Championship	12–20 May 2015	(Myanmar) Naypyidaw	2	Iran
2015 Asian U23 Championship	12–20 May 2015	(Myanmar) Naypyidaw	2	South Korea
U21 World Ranking	December 2014	(Switzerland) Lausanne	1	Turkey
Total			12	

== Pools composition ==
Teams were seeded following the Serpentine system according to their FIVB U21 World Ranking as of December 2014. FIVB reserved the right to seed the hosts as head of pool A regardless of the U21 World Ranking. Rankings are shown in brackets except the hosts who ranked 72nd.

Pool A	Pool B
United Arab Emirates (Hosts)	Russia (1)
Italy (3)	Brazil (2)
Iran (5)	Argentina (6)
Cuba (13)	Turkey (7)
South Korea (16)	Mexico (22)
Egypt (26)	Tunisia (25)

== Venues ==
Pool A and Final round	Pool B
Dubai, United Arab Emirates	Dubai, United Arab Emirates
Hamdan Sports Complex	Sheikh Rashid Bin Maktoum Sports Hall
Capacity: 3,000	Capacity: 3,000

== Pool standing procedure ==
1. Number of matches won
2. Match points
3. Sets ratio
4. Points ratio
5. Result of the last match between the tied teams

Match won 3–0 or 3–1: 3 match points for the winner, 0 match points for the loser
Match won 3–2: 2 match points for the winner, 1 match point for the loser

== Preliminary round ==
- All times are UAE Standard Time (UTC+04:00).

=== Pool A ===
Pos	Team	Pld	W	L	Pts	SW	SL	SR	SPW	SPL	SPR	Qualification
1	Cuba	5	5	0	14	15	3	5.000	443	397	1.116	Semifinals
2	Italy	5	4	1	13	14	6	2.333	477	410	1.163	Semifinals
3	Iran	5	3	2	8	11	9	1.222	475	417	1.139	5th–8th semifinals
4	South Korea	5	2	3	6	8	10	0.800	405	412	0.983	5th–8th semifinals
5	Egypt	5	1	4	4	7	13	0.538	401	449	0.893	
6	United Arab Emirates	5	0	5	0	1	15	0.067	284	400	0.710	

Date	Time		Score		Set 1	Set 2	Set 3	Set 4	Set 5	Total	Report
24 Aug	14:00	Italy	3–1	Egypt	22–25	25–14	25–16	25–19		97–74	P2 P3
24 Aug	16:30	Cuba	3–0	South Korea	25–21	25–21	25–22			75–64	P2 P3
24 Aug	20:50	United Arab Emirates	0–3	Iran	16–25	16–25	20–25			52–75	P2 P3
25 Aug	14:00	Cuba	3–0	Egypt	25–20	25–19	25–17			75–56	P2 P3
25 Aug	16:30	Iran	3–1	South Korea	22–25	25–22	25–17	25–22		97–86	P2 P3
25 Aug	19:15	United Arab Emirates	0–3	Italy	20–25	13–25	12–25			45–75	P2 P3
26 Aug	14:00	Iran	1–3	Cuba	31–33	23–25	25–15	24–26		103–99	P2 P3
26 Aug	17:00	Italy	3–1	South Korea	25–15	29–31	25–22	25–18		104–86	P2 P3
26 Aug	19:45	United Arab Emirates	1–3	Egypt	14–25	21–25	25–22	12–25		72–97	P2 P3
28 Aug	14:00	Italy	3–1	Iran	25–23	15–25	25–17	26–24		91–89	P2 P3
28 Aug	16:30	United Arab Emirates	0–3	Cuba	22–25	26–28	16–25			64–78	P2 P3
28 Aug	19:00	South Korea	3–1	Egypt	25–20	25–18	19–25	25–22		94–85	P2 P3
29 Aug	14:00	Italy	2–3	Cuba	27–25	25–23	24–26	25–27	9–15	110–116	P2 P3
29 Aug	16:30	Iran	3–2	Egypt	25–17	22–25	25–12	24–26	15–9	111–89	P2 P3
29 Aug	20:00	United Arab Emirates	0–3	South Korea	17–25	18–25	16–25			51–75	P2 P3

=== Pool B ===
Pos	Team	Pld	W	L	Pts	SW	SL	SR	SPW	SPL	SPR	Qualification
1	Russia	5	5	0	13	15	6	2.500	484	415	1.166	Semifinals
2	Turkey	5	3	2	10	12	7	1.714	429	406	1.057	Semifinals
3	Brazil	5	3	2	10	12	8	1.500	462	427	1.082	5th–8th semifinals
4	Argentina	5	3	2	8	12	10	1.200	483	464	1.041	5th–8th semifinals
5	Tunisia	5	1	4	4	7	12	0.583	399	439	0.909	
6	Mexico	5	0	5	0	0	15	0.000	273	379	0.720	

Date	Time		Score		Set 1	Set 2	Set 3	Set 4	Set 5	Total	Report
24 Aug	12:00	Russia	3–1	Tunisia	25–15	22–25	25–18	25–22		97–80	P2 P3
24 Aug	14:30	Argentina	1–3	Turkey	19–25	21–25	25–22	19–25		84–97	P2 P3
24 Aug	17:00	Brazil	3–0	Mexico	25–14	25–15	25–16			75–45	P2 P3
25 Aug	14:00	Turkey	3–0	Tunisia	25–20	25–22	25–14			75–56	P2 P3
25 Aug	16:30	Argentina	3–0	Mexico	25–17	25–19	25–14			75–50	P2 P3
25 Aug	19:00	Russia	3–1	Brazil	26–24	17–25	25–16	25–21		93–86	P2 P3
26 Aug	14:00	Turkey	3–0	Mexico	25–22	28–26	25–12			78–60	P2 P3
26 Aug	16:30	Russia	3–2	Argentina	23–25	25–21	22–25	25–22	15–9	110–102	P2 P3
26 Aug	19:20	Brazil	3–1	Tunisia	25–21	22–25	25–21	25–20		97–87	P2 P3
28 Aug	14:00	Mexico	0–3	Tunisia	22–25	21–25	24–26			67–76	P2 P3
28 Aug	16:30	Russia	3–2	Turkey	21–25	25–15	25–23	23–25	15–8	109–96	P2 P3
28 Aug	19:35	Brazil	2–3	Argentina	18–25	18–25	33–31	25–23	13–15	107–119	P2 P3
29 Aug	14:00	Russia	3–0	Mexico	25–22	25–12	25–17			75–51	P2 P3
29 Aug	16:30	Brazil	3–1	Turkey	22–25	25–18	25–19	25–21		97–83	P2 P3
29 Aug	19:10	Argentina	3–2	Tunisia	25–21	21–25	25–23	17–25	15–6	103–100	P2 P3

== Final round ==
- All times are UAE Standard Time (UTC+04:00).

=== 5th–8th places ===
5th–8th semifinals
30 August
Iran	1
Argentina	3
30 August
Brazil	3
South Korea	0

5th place match
31 August
Argentina	1
Brazil	3
7th place match
31 August
Iran	3
South Korea	1

==== 5th–8th semifinals ====
Date	Time		Score		Set 1	Set 2	Set 3	Set 4	Set 5	Total	Report
30 Aug	12:00	Iran	1–3	Argentina	17–25	25–16	23–25	21–25		86–91	P2 P3
30 Aug	14:30	Brazil	3–0	South Korea	25–20	25–15	25–22			75–57	P2 P3

==== 7th place match ====
Date	Time		Score		Set 1	Set 2	Set 3	Set 4	Set 5	Total	Report
31 Aug	12:00	Iran	3–1	South Korea	25–23	25–20	17–25	25–15		92–83	P2 P3

==== 5th place match ====
Date	Time		Score		Set 1	Set 2	Set 3	Set 4	Set 5	Total	Report
31 Aug	14:30	Argentina	1–3	Brazil	19–25	18–25	32–30	22–25		91–105	P2 P3

=== Final four ===
Semifinals
30 August
Cuba	0
Turkey	3
30 August
Russia	3
Italy	0

Final
31 August
Turkey	1
Russia	3
3rd place match
31 August
Cuba	1
Italy	3

==== Semifinals ====
Date	Time		Score		Set 1	Set 2	Set 3	Set 4	Set 5	Total	Report
30 Aug	16:30	Cuba	0–3	Turkey	19–25	18–25	25–27			62–77	P2 P3
30 Aug	19:00	Russia	3–0	Italy	25–20	25–18	27–25			77–63	P2 P3

==== 3rd place match ====
Date	Time		Score		Set 1	Set 2	Set 3	Set 4	Set 5	Total	Report
31 Aug	17:10	Cuba	1–3	Italy	22–25	25–18	23–25	21–25		91–93	P2 P3

==== Final ====
Date	Time		Score		Set 1	Set 2	Set 3	Set 4	Set 5	Total	Report
31 Aug	19:50	Turkey	1–3	Russia	24–26	25–16	18–25	24–26		91–93	P2 P3

== Final standing ==
Rank	Team
1st place, gold medalist(s)	Russia
2nd place, silver medalist(s)	Turkey
3rd place, bronze medalist(s)	Italy
4	Cuba
5	Brazil
6	Argentina
7	Iran
8	South Korea
9	Tunisia
9	Egypt
11	Mexico
11	United Arab Emirates

2015 Men's U23 World champions

Russia
1st title

12–man roster
Pavel Pankov, Ivan Demakov, Egor Feoktistov (c), Ilya Petrushov, Ivan Podrebinkin, Roman Zhos, Aleksandr Kimerov, Dmitry Volkov, Maxim Maximenko, Egor Kliuka, Sergei Nikitin, Sergey Ershov
Head coach
Mikhail Nikolaev

== Awards ==
- Most valuable player
  (Russia) Egor Kliuka
- Best setter
  (Turkey) Murat Yenipazar
- Best outside spikers
  (Russia) Egor Kliuka
  (Turkey) Gökhan Gökgöz
- Best middle blockers
  (Russia) Ivan Demakov
  (Turkey) Samet Güneş
- Best opposite spiker
  (Turkey) Metin Toy
- Best libero
  (Cuba) Yonder Garcia

== See also ==
- 2015 FIVB Volleyball Women's U23 World Championship
