= 2017 FIVB Volleyball Men's U23 World Championship =

2017 FIVB Men's U23 World Championship
بطولة العالم للكرة الطائرة للرجال تحت 23 عاما 2017 مِصر

Tournament details
- Host country: Egypt
- Dates: 18–25 August
- Teams: 12
- Venue: 2 (in 1 host city)

Final positions
- Champions: Argentina (1st title)
- Runners-up: Russia
- Third place: Cuba
- Fourth place: Brazil

Tournament awards
- MVP: (Argentina) Germán Johansen
- Best Setter: (Argentina) Matías Sánchez
- Best OH: (Russia) Denis Bogdan (Cuba) Miguel Gutiérrez
- Best MB: (Russia) Ivan Iakovlev (Brazil) Matheus Santos
- Best OPP: (Egypt) Hisham Ewais
- Best Libero: (Brazil) Rogério Filho

The 2017 FIVB Volleyball Men's U23 World Championship was the third and final edition of the international volleyball tournament and the world championship for men's national teams under the age of 23, organized by the sport's world governing body, FIVB. The tournament was held in Cairo, Egypt from 18 to 25 August 2017. 12 teams from the 5 confederations competed in the tournament.

Argentina defeated defending champions Russia 4–2 in the final to claim their first title in the competition. This marked Argentina's first ever world title at any age group. Cuba won the bronze medal outclassing Brazil 4–1. Germán Johansen from Argentina was elected the MVP.

After this tournament, FIVB declared that "As per decision of May 2019 FIVB Board of Administration, the U23 WCH has been abolished."

== Qualification ==
The FIVB Sports Events Council revealed a proposal to streamline the number of teams participating in the Age Group World Championships.

Means of Qualification		Date	Venue	Vacancies	Qualifiers
Host Nation		2 February 2016	(Switzerland) Lausanne	1	Egypt
2016 South American Championship		21–25 June 2016	(Colombia) Cartagena	1	Brazil
2016 European Qualifiers		27–31 July 2016	(Croatia) Zagreb	2	Poland
2016 European Qualifiers		27–31 July 2016	(Croatia) Zagreb	2	Turkey
2016 Pan-American Cup	For CSV	5–10 September 2016	(Mexico) Guanajuato City	1	Argentina
2016 Pan-American Cup	For NORCECA	5–10 September 2016	(Mexico) Guanajuato City	2	Cuba
2016 Pan-American Cup	For NORCECA	5–10 September 2016	(Mexico) Guanajuato City	2	Mexico
2017 African Championship		21–22 February 2017	(Algeria) Algiers	1	Algeria
2017 Asian Championship		1–9 May 2017	(Iran) Ardabil	2	Iran
2017 Asian Championship		1–9 May 2017	(Iran) Ardabil	2	Japan
World Ranking		January 2017	(Switzerland) Lausanne	2	Russia
World Ranking		January 2017	(Switzerland) Lausanne	2	China
Total				12	

== Pools composition ==
Teams were seeded following the Serpentine system according to their FIVB U23 World Ranking as of January 2017. FIVB reserved the right to seed the hosts as head of pool A regardless of the U23 World Ranking. Rankings are shown in brackets except the hosts who ranked 10th.

Pool A	Pool B
Egypt (Hosts)	Turkey (1)
Cuba (4)	Russia (3)
Brazil (5)	Argentina (6)
Mexico (11)	Iran (7)
Poland (12)	Algeria (13)
Japan (25)	China (17)

== Venues ==
All matches
(Egypt) Cairo
Cairo Stadium Halls Complex 1 & 2
Capacity: 20,000

== Testing of new rules ==
The 2017 FIVB Men's U23 World Championship will be a testing ground for a new scoring scheme currently under review by the FIVB, which, if successful, could mark a historical turning point for volleyball – much as the introduction of the Rally Scoring System did in the late 1990s.

Matches in Cairo will be played to best-of-seven sets with each set to 15 points (with at least a two-point difference needed). Three ranking points will be awarded to teams winning 4–0, 4–1 or 4–2. Two points go the winner of a 4–3 match with one point for the loser. It is hoped that the new scoring system will reduce overall duration of matches, while making each set more attractive and exciting – much as tie-breaks are under the current regulations. The interval between sets is reduced to two minutes (from three). Teams will switch ends after the second set - and also, if needed, after sets 4, 5 and 6. In addition, there will be no technical timeouts – just two regular thirty-second timeouts per team per set.

The basic principles for the new scheme were tested for the first time in the Dutch League in the 2016–17 season. Further testing of the scheme will be conducted at the Women's U23 World Championship in Ljubljana. During and after the competition, players, coaches, referees and officials will be evaluating the new system through a questionnaire, while duration and scoring statistics will be gathered and analysed.

This is the second time that the Men's U23 World Championship serves as a testbed for new regulations. Matches of the inaugural edition in 2013 in Uberlândia were played to 21-point sets. In addition to the scoring system, a new serving regulation will be tried out in Cairo, with the server not allowed to land inside the court after a jump service.

The testing of the new rules has been received with criticism from the volleyball community.

== Pool standing procedure ==
1. Number of matches won
2. Match points
3. Sets ratio
4. Points ratio
5. Result of the last match between the tied teams

Match won 4–0, 4–1 or 4–2: 3 match points for the winner, 0 match points for the loser
Match won 4–3: 2 match points for the winner, 1 match point for the loser

== Preliminary round ==
- All times are Eastern European Time (UTC+02:00).

=== Pool A ===
Pos	Team	Pld	W	L	Pts	SW	SL	SR	SPW	SPL	SPR	Qualification
1	Brazil	5	5	0	14	20	4	5.000	365	285	1.281	Semifinals
2	Cuba	5	3	2	10	16	13	1.231	418	407	1.027	Semifinals
3	Egypt	5	3	2	8	15	13	1.154	413	382	1.081	5th–8th semifinals
4	Japan	5	2	3	7	13	14	0.929	358	374	0.957	5th–8th semifinals
5	Poland	5	2	3	6	11	13	0.846	354	350	1.011	
6	Mexico	5	0	5	0	2	20	0.100	232	342	0.678	

Date	Time		Score		Set 1	Set 2	Set 3	Set 4	Set 5	Set 6	Set 7	Total	Report
18 Aug	14:30	Brazil	4–0	Mexico	15–7	15–8	15–6	15–10				60–31	Report
18 Aug	17:00	Cuba	1–4	Poland	12–15	15–12	14–16	10–15	15–17			66–75	Report
18 Aug	21:00	Egypt	4–3	Japan	15–10	15–13	12–15	15–8	9–15	13–15	15–10	94–86	Report
19 Aug	15:00	Mexico	0–4	Japan	12–15	12–15	11–15	10–15				45–60	Report
19 Aug	17:30	Brazil	4–0	Poland	15–10	22–20	20–18	15–7				74–57	Report
19 Aug	20:00	Egypt	2–4	Cuba	15–13	14–16	15–10	12–15	11–15	16–18		83–87	Report
20 Aug	15:00	Cuba	4–2	Japan	15–13	19–17	14–16	13–15	16–14	15–13		92–88	Report
20 Aug	17:30	Mexico	0–4	Poland	8–15	8–15	10–15	10–15				36–60	Report
20 Aug	20:00	Egypt	1–4	Brazil	12–15	16–18	11–15	15–12	12–15			66–75	Report
21 Aug	15:00	Poland	2–4	Japan	13–15	16–14	12–15	13–15	15–8	13–15		82–82	Report
21 Aug	17:30	Cuba	3–4	Brazil	15–13	13–15	15–11	15–11	11–15	8–15	12–15	89–95	Report
21 Aug	20:00	Egypt	4–1	Mexico	15–5	15–7	13–15	15–9	20–18			78–54	Report
23 Aug	15:00	Brazil	4–0	Japan	15–9	15–12	15–7	16–14				61–42	Report
23 Aug	17:30	Cuba	4–1	Mexico	15–7	15–9	24–26	15–13	15–11			84–66	Report
23 Aug	20:00	Egypt	4–1	Poland	15–13	15–7	32–30	13–15	17–15			92–80	Report

=== Pool B ===
Pos	Team	Pld	W	L	Pts	SW	SL	SR	SPW	SPL	SPR	Qualification
1	Argentina	5	4	1	13	19	8	2.375	385	316	1.218	Semifinals
2	Russia	5	4	1	12	19	7	2.714	374	323	1.158	Semifinals
3	Iran	5	4	1	11	18	8	2.250	379	332	1.142	5th–8th semifinals
4	China	5	2	3	5	8	15	0.533	281	316	0.889	5th–8th semifinals
5	Turkey	5	1	4	5	9	18	0.500	342	384	0.891	
6	Algeria	5	0	5	0	3	20	0.150	259	349	0.742	

Date	Time		Score		Set 1	Set 2	Set 3	Set 4	Set 5	Set 6	Set 7	Total	Report
18 Aug	14:30	Turkey	3–4	China	17–19	15–12	15–11	8–15	10–15	15–10	10–15	90–97	Report
18 Aug	17:00	Russia	4–0	Algeria	15–8	15–11	15–11	15–8				60–38	Report
18 Aug	21:00	Argentina	4–2	Iran	16–14	11–15	15–11	18–16	13–15	15–10		88–81	Report
19 Aug	15:00	Iran	4–0	China	15–13	15–12	15–8	15–13				60–46	Report
19 Aug	17:30	Argentina	4–0	Algeria	15–11	15–8	15–9	15–12				60–40	Report
19 Aug	20:00	Turkey	0–4	Russia	16–18	13–15	6–15	13–15				48–63	Report
20 Aug	15:00	Russia	4–0	China	15–8	15–11	15–11	15–11				60–41	Report
20 Aug	17:30	Turkey	2–4	Argentina	8–15	15–6	7–15	17–15	11–15	9–15		67–81	Report
20 Aug	20:00	Iran	4–1	Algeria	16–18	15–8	15–7	15–9	15–12			76–54	Report
21 Aug	15:00	Algeria	0–4	China	15–17	13–15	7–15	11–15				46–62	Report
21 Aug	17:30	Turkey	0–4	Iran	12–15	9–15	15–17	10–15				46–62	Report
21 Aug	20:00	Russia	4–3	Argentina	11–15	15–12	13–15	15–13	8–15	15–12	16–14	96–96	Report
23 Aug	15:00	Argentina	4–0	China	15–8	15–9	15–9	15–9				60–35	Report
23 Aug	17:30	Russia	3–4	Iran	11–15	15–12	15–10	13–15	15–13	18–20	11–15	98–100	Report
23 Aug	20:00	Turkey	4–2	Algeria	15–10	17–19	14–16	15–11	15–12	15–13		91–81	Report

== Final round ==
- All times are Eastern European Time (UTC+02:00).

=== 5th–8th places ===
5th–8th semifinals
24 August
Egypt	4
China	1
24 August
Iran	3
Japan	4

5th-place match
25 August
Egypt	4
Japan	0
7th-place match
24 August
China	1
Iran	4

==== 5th–8th semifinals ====
Date	Time		Score		Set 1	Set 2	Set 3	Set 4	Set 5	Set 6	Set 7	Total	Report
24 Aug	15:00	Iran	3–4	Japan	14–16	15–10	15–13	11–15	15–12	13–15	7–15	90–96	Report
24 Aug	20:00	Egypt	4–1	China	15–12	15–13	12–15	19–17	15–8			76–65	Report

==== 7th-place match ====
Date	Time		Score		Set 1	Set 2	Set 3	Set 4	Set 5	Set 6	Set 7	Total	Report
25 Aug	10:00	China	1–4	Iran	15–17	5–15	11–15	19–17	18–20			68–84	Report

==== 5th-place match ====
Date	Time		Score		Set 1	Set 2	Set 3	Set 4	Set 5	Set 6	Set 7	Total	Report
25 Aug	15:00	Egypt	4–0	Japan	15–9	15–8	15–11	15–12				60–40	Report

=== Final four ===
Semifinals
24 August
Brazil	3
Russia	4
24 August
Argentina	4
Cuba	1

Final
25 August
Russia	2
Argentina	4
3rd-place match
25 August
Brazil	1
Cuba	4

==== Semifinals ====
Date	Time		Score		Set 1	Set 2	Set 3	Set 4	Set 5	Set 6	Set 7	Total	Report
24 Aug	15:00	Brazil	3–4	Russia	15–11	15–13	11–15	15–17	15–13	13–15	8–15	92–99	Report
24 Aug	17:30	Argentina	4–1	Cuba	15–7	15–7	11–15	15–13	17–15			73–57	Report

==== 3rd-place match ====
Date	Time		Score		Set 1	Set 2	Set 3	Set 4	Set 5	Set 6	Set 7	Total	Report
25 Aug	15:30	Brazil	1–4	Cuba	16–18	13–15	13–15	22–20	11–15			75–83	Report

==== Final ====
Date	Time		Score		Set 1	Set 2	Set 3	Set 4	Set 5	Set 6	Set 7	Total	Report
25 Aug	18:00	Russia	2–4	Argentina	10–15	11–15	14–16	16–14	15–13	9–15		75–88	Report

== Final standing ==
Rank	Team
1st place, gold medalist(s)	Argentina
2nd place, silver medalist(s)	Russia
3rd place, bronze medalist(s)	Cuba
4	Brazil
5	Egypt
6	Japan
7	Iran
8	China
9	Poland
9	Turkey
11	Algeria
11	Mexico

2017 Men's U23 World champions

Argentina
1st title

12–man roster
Matías Sánchez, Brian Melgarejo, Jan Martínez, Edgar Vieira, Ignacio Luengas, Gaspar Bitar, Santiago Danani, Liam Arreche, Gastón Fernández (c), Agustín Loser, Andrés Arduino, Germán Johansen
Head coach
Camilo Soto

== Awards ==
- Most valuable player
  (Argentina) Germán Johansen
- Best setter
  (Argentina) Matías Sánchez
- Best outside spikers
  (Russia) Denis Bogdan
  (Cuba) Miguel Gutiérrez
- Best middle blockers
  (Russia) Ivan Iakovlev
  (Brazil) Matheus Santos
- Best opposite spiker
  (Egypt) Hisham Ewais
- Best libero
  (Brazil) Rogério Filho

== See also ==
- 2017 FIVB Volleyball Women's U23 World Championship
