= 2013 FIVB Volleyball Men's U23 World Championship =

Sport competition

2013 FIVB Men's U23 World Championship
Campeonato Mundial de Masculino Sub-23 Brasil 2013

Tournament details
- Host country: Brazil
- Dates: 6–13 October
- Teams: 12
- Venue: 1 (in 1 host city)

Final positions
- Champions: Brazil (1st title)
- Runners-up: Serbia
- Third place: Russia
- Fourth place: Bulgaria

Tournament awards
- MVP: (Brazil) Ricardo Lucarelli Souza
- Best Setter: (Russia) Dmitry Kovalev
- Best OH: (Serbia) Uroš Kovačević (Serbia) Filip Stoilović
- Best MB: (Bulgaria) Ventsislav Ragin (Brazil) Matheus Cunda
- Best OPP: (Serbia) Aleksandar Atanasijević
- Best Libero: (Brazil) Guilherme Kachel

Tournament statistics
- Matches played: 38

The 2013 FIVB Volleyball Men's U23 World Championship was held in Uberlândia, Brazil from 6 to 13 October 2013. This was the first edition of the tournament.

== Twenty-one point rule ==
For this tournament, the first four sets were played over 21 points.

== Qualification ==
The 2013 FIVB Volleyball Men's U23 World Championship will feature two countries per confederation plus the host Brazil and the highest country in the world rankings not already selected by their confederation, in this case Russia.

Confederation	Method of Qualification	Vacancies	Qualified
	Host	1	Brazil
CAVB	FIVB Senior Ranking	2	Egypt; Tunisia
AVC	FIVB Senior Ranking	2	Australia; Iran
CEV	FIVB Junior and Youth Ranking	2	Serbia; Bulgaria
NORCECA	2012 U23 Pan-American Cup	2	Mexico; Dominican Republic
CSV	2012 U23 Pan-American Cup	2	Argentina; Venezuela
	Best ranked team	1	Russia

== Pools composition ==
Teams were seeded following the Serpentine system according to their FIVB World Ranking as of 22 July 2013. FIVB reserved the right to seed the hosts as head of pool A regardless of the World Ranking. Rankings are shown in brackets except the hosts who ranked 1st.

Pool A	Pool B
Brazil (Hosts)	Russia (2)
Argentina (8)	Serbia (7)
Bulgaria (9)	Australia (12)
Egypt (14)	Iran (12)
Tunisia (15)	Venezuela (20)
Dominican Republic (41)	Mexico (23)

== Venue ==
All matches
Uberlândia, Brazil
Ginásio Municipal Tancredo Neves
Capacity: 8,000
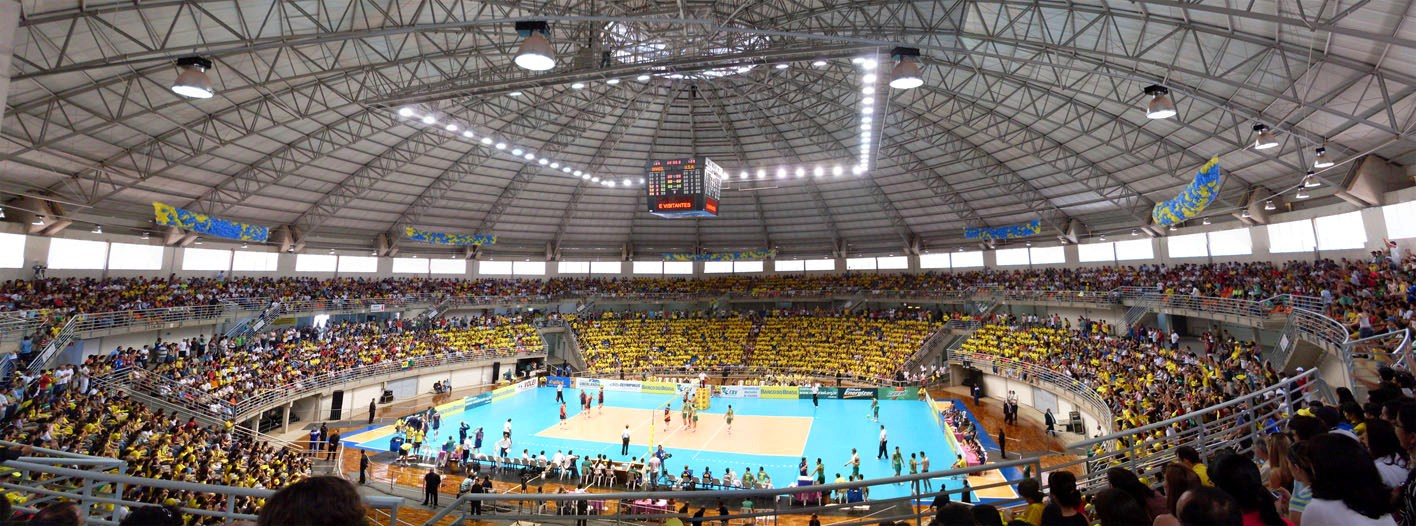

== Pool standing procedure ==
1. Match points
2. Number of matches won
3. Sets ratio
4. Points ratio
5. Result of the last match between the tied teams

Match won 3–0 or 3–1: 3 match points for the winner, 0 match points for the loser
Match won 3–2: 2 match points for the winner, 1 match point for the loser

== Preliminary round ==
- All times are Brasília Time (UTC−03:00).

=== Pool A ===
Pos	Team	Pld	W	L	Pts	SW	SL	SR	SPW	SPL	SPR	Qualification
1	Brazil	5	5	0	14	15	2	7.500	349	262	1.332	Semifinals
2	Bulgaria	5	4	1	12	12	4	3.000	329	271	1.214	Semifinals
3	Argentina	5	3	2	9	12	8	1.500	387	366	1.057	5th–8th semifinals
4	Tunisia	5	2	3	6	8	11	0.727	349	353	0.989	5th–8th semifinals
5	Egypt	5	1	4	4	5	12	0.417	275	326	0.844	
6	Dominican Republic	5	0	5	0	0	15	0.000	213	324	0.657	

Date	Time		Score		Set 1	Set 2	Set 3	Set 4	Set 5	Total	Report
6 Oct	16:30	Argentina	3–2	Tunisia	21–14	21–18	13–21	19–21	16–14	90–88	P2 P3
6 Oct	19:00	Brazil	3–0	Dominican Republic	21–12	21–6	21–10			63–28	P2 P3
6 Oct	21:30	Bulgaria	3–0	Egypt	21–17	21–17	21–12			63–46	P2 P3
7 Oct	16:30	Bulgaria	3–0	Dominican Republic	21–13	21–11	21–14			63–38	P2 P3
7 Oct	19:00	Brazil	3–2	Argentina	19–21	16–21	22–20	21–17	19–17	97–96	P2 P3
7 Oct	21:45	Egypt	2–3	Tunisia	19–21	17–21	21–18	21–19	7–15	85–94	P2 P3
8 Oct	16:30	Tunisia	0–3	Bulgaria	28–30	18–21	12–21			58–72	P2 P3
8 Oct	19:00	Brazil	3–0	Egypt	21–9	21–15	21–16			63–40	P2 P3
8 Oct	21:30	Dominican Republic	0–3	Argentina	14–21	25–27	22–24			61–72	P2 P3
9 Oct	16:30	Egypt	0–3	Argentina	18–21	10–21	13–21			41–63	P2 P3
9 Oct	19:00	Brazil	3–0	Bulgaria	21–19	21–14	21–19			63–52	P2 P3
9 Oct	21:30	Tunisia	3–0	Dominican Republic	21–12	21–16	21–15			63–43	P2 P3
11 Oct	16:30	Argentina	1–3	Bulgaria	16–21	21–16	14–21	15–21		66–79	P2 P3
11 Oct	19:00	Brazil	3–0	Tunisia	21–18	21–17	21–11			63–46	P2 P3
11 Oct	21:30	Dominican Republic	0–3	Egypt	13–21	16–21	14–21			43–63	P2 P3

=== Pool B ===
Pos	Team	Pld	W	L	Pts	SW	SL	SR	SPW	SPL	SPR	Qualification
1	Serbia	5	5	0	15	15	1	15.000	331	269	1.230	Semifinals
2	Russia	5	4	1	12	12	4	3.000	318	269	1.182	Semifinals
3	Iran	5	3	2	9	10	6	1.667	304	259	1.174	5th–8th semifinals
4	Venezuela	5	2	3	6	7	11	0.636	341	347	0.983	5th–8th semifinals
5	Australia	5	1	4	3	4	13	0.308	290	356	0.815	
6	Mexico	5	0	5	0	2	15	0.133	265	349	0.759	

Date	Time		Score		Set 1	Set 2	Set 3	Set 4	Set 5	Total	Report
6 Oct	09:00	Russia	3–0	Mexico	21–11	21–14	21–13			63–38	P2 P3
6 Oct	11:00	Serbia	3–1	Venezuela	15–21	21–18	21–19	21–14		78–72	P2 P3
6 Oct	14:00	Australia	0–3	Iran	11–21	15–21	7–21			33–63	P2 P3
7 Oct	09:00	Mexico	0–3	Iran	12–21	10–21	14–21			36–63	P2 P3
7 Oct	11:00	Russia	3–0	Venezuela	21–16	21–15	22–20			64–51	P2 P3
7 Oct	14:00	Serbia	3–0	Australia	21–18	22–20	21–14			64–52	P2 P3
8 Oct	09:00	Russia	3–1	Iran	22–20	15–21	21–17	21–12		79–70	P2 P3
8 Oct	11:15	Venezuela	3–1	Australia	21–15	21–13	28–30	21–19		91–77	P2 P3
8 Oct	14:00	Mexico	0–3	Serbia	18–21	14–21	19–21			51–63	P2 P3
9 Oct	09:00	Russia	3–0	Australia	21–16	21–13	21–18			63–47	P2 P3
9 Oct	11:00	Iran	0–3	Serbia	13–21	13–21	19–21			45–63	P2 P3
9 Oct	14:00	Venezuela	3–1	Mexico	21–17	21–12	16–21	21–15		79–65	P2 P3
11 Oct	09:00	Australia	3–1	Mexico	21–18	21–17	18–21	21–19		81–75	P2 P3
11 Oct	11:14	Iran	3–0	Venezuela	21–13	21–18	21–17			63–48	P2 P3
11 Oct	14:00	Russia	0–3	Serbia	15–21	16–21	18–21			49–63	P2 P3

== Final round ==
- All times are Brasília Time (UTC−03:00).

=== 5th–8th places ===
5th–8th semifinals
12 October
Argentina	0
Venezuela	3
12 October
Iran	3
Tunisia	1

5th place match
13 October
Venezuela	0
Iran	3
7th place match
13 October
Argentina	3
Tunisia	0

==== 5th–8th semifinals ====
Date	Time		Score		Set 1	Set 2	Set 3	Set 4	Set 5	Total	Report
12 Oct	13:30	Argentina	0–3	Venezuela	18–21	14–21	14–21			46–63	P2 P3
12 Oct	16:00	Iran	3–1	Tunisia	21–13	21–18	18–21	21–17		81–69	P2 P3

==== 7th place match ====
Date	Time		Score		Set 1	Set 2	Set 3	Set 4	Set 5	Total	Report
13 Oct	10:00	Argentina	3–0	Tunisia	21–19	21–15	21–15			63–49	P2 P3

==== 5th place match ====
Date	Time		Score		Set 1	Set 2	Set 3	Set 4	Set 5	Total	Report
13 Oct	12:30	Venezuela	0–3	Iran	14–21	21–23	17–21			52–65	P2 P3

=== Final four ===
Semifinals
12 October
Brazil	3
Russia	0
12 October
Serbia	3
Bulgaria	0

Final
13 October
Brazil	3
Serbia	2
3rd place match
13 October
Russia	3
Bulgaria	1

==== Semifinals ====
Date	Time		Score		Set 1	Set 2	Set 3	Set 4	Set 5	Total	Report
12 Oct	18:30	Brazil	3–0	Russia	21–16	22–20	25–23			68–59	P2 P3
12 Oct	21:00	Serbia	3–0	Bulgaria	21–13	21–18	21–10			63–41	P2 P3

==== 3rd place match ====
Date	Time		Score		Set 1	Set 2	Set 3	Set 4	Set 5	Total	Report
13 Oct	15:00	Russia	3–1	Bulgaria	22–24	22–20	27–25	21–15		92–84	P2 P3

==== Final ====
Date	Time		Score		Set 1	Set 2	Set 3	Set 4	Set 5	Total	Report
13 Oct	17:30	Brazil	3–2	Serbia	29–27	15–21	21–17	19–21	15–13	99–99	P2 P3

== Final standing ==
Rank	Team
1st place, gold medalist(s)	Brazil
2nd place, silver medalist(s)	Serbia
3rd place, bronze medalist(s)	Russia
4	Bulgaria
5	Iran
6	Venezuela
7	Argentina
8	Tunisia
9	Egypt
10	Australia
11	Mexico
12	Dominican Republic

2013 Men's U23 World champions

Brazil
1st title

13–man roster
Alan Souza, Fernando Kreling, Otávio Pinto, Lucas Lóh, Thiago Veloso, Ricardo Lucarelli Souza (c), Felipe Quaresma, Ary Nóbrega, Matheus Cunda, Leandro Santos, Rafael Araújo, Ricardo Rego, Guilherme Kachel
Head coach
Roberley Leonaldo

== Awards ==
- Most valuable player
  (Brazil) Ricardo Lucarelli Souza
- Best setter
  (Russia) Dmitry Kovalev
- Best Outside Spikers
  (Serbia) Uroš Kovačević
  (Serbia) Filip Stoilović
- Best Middle Blockers
  (Bulgaria) Ventsislav Ragin
  (Brazil) Matheus Cunda
- Best opposite spiker
  (Serbia) Aleksandar Atanasijević
- Best libero
  (Brazil) Guilherme Kachel
