= Poland men's national volleyball team =

National team representing Poland in men's volleyball matches

Poland
- Nickname(s): Biało–Czerwoni (The White and Reds)
- Association: Polish Volleyball Federation
- Confederation: CEV
- Head coach: Nikola Grbić
- FIVB ranking: 1 (15 October 2026)

Uniforms
Home	Away	Third

Summer Olympics
- Appearances: 11 (First in 1968)
- Best result: (1976)

World Championship
- Appearances: 19 (First in 1949)
- Best result: (gold) (1974, 2014, 2018)

World Cup
- Appearances: 7 (First in 1965)
- Best result: (1965, 2011, 2019)

European Championship
- Appearances: 29 (First in 1950)
- Best result: (gold) (2009, 2023, 2026)
- pzps.pl (in Polish)
Honours
Event	1st	2nd	3rd
Olympic Games	1	1	0
World Championship	3	2	1
World Cup	0	3	1
World League	1	0	1
Nations League	3	1	3
European Championship	3	5	4
Total	11	12	10
Medal record
Olympic Games
Gold medal – first place	1976 Montreal	Team
Silver medal – second place	2024 Paris	Team
World Championship
Gold medal – first place	1974 Mexico	
Gold medal – first place	2014 Poland	
Gold medal – first place	2018 Italy/Bulgaria	
Silver medal – second place	2006 Japan	
Silver medal – second place	2022 Poland/Slovenia	
Bronze medal – third place	2025 Philippines	
World Cup
Silver medal – second place	1965 Poland	
Silver medal – second place	2011 Japan	
Silver medal – second place	2019 Japan	
Bronze medal – third place	2015 Japan	
World League
Gold medal – first place	2012 Sofia	
Bronze medal – third place	2011 Gdańsk	
Nations League
Gold medal – first place	2023 Gdańsk	
Gold medal – first place	2025 Ningbo	
Gold medal – first place	2026 Ningbo	
Silver medal – second place	2021 Rimini	
Bronze medal – third place	2019 Chicago	
Bronze medal – third place	2022 Bologna	
Bronze medal – third place	2024 Łódź	
European Championship
Gold medal – first place	2009 Turkey	
Gold medal – first place	2023 Italy/Bulgaria/North Macedonia/Israel	
Gold medal – first place	2026 Italy/Bulgaria/Romania/Finland	
Silver medal – second place	1975 Yugoslavia	
Silver medal – second place	1977 Finland	
Silver medal – second place	1979 France	
Silver medal – second place	1981 Bulgaria	
Silver medal – second place	1983 East Germany	
Bronze medal – third place	1967 Turkey	
Bronze medal – third place	2011 Austria/Czech Republic	
Bronze medal – third place	2019 France/Slovenia/Belgium/Netherlands	
Bronze medal – third place	2021 Poland/Czech Republic/Estonia/Finland	

The Poland men's national volleyball team (Polish: Reprezentacja Polski w piłce siatkowej mężczyzn) represents Poland in international volleyball competition. The team is directed by the Polish Volleyball Federation (Polski Związek Piłki Siatkowej, PZPS), the governing body for volleyball in Poland, which represents the country in international competitions and friendly matches.

Poland's greatest achievements to date have been winning gold medal at the 1976 Summer Olympics, three World Championship titles (1974, 2014 and 2018), three European Championship titles (2009, 2023 and 2026), World League (2012) and the Nations League (2023, 2025 and 2026).

As of October 2026, Poland is one of the world's strongest teams, ranked first in the FIVB world ranking.

== History ==
Poland achieved some of its best results in the 1970s, with gold medals at 1974 World Championship and the 1976 Montreal Summer Olympics. They also won five consecutive silver medals at the European Championship, between 1975 and 1983.

=== 2005–2008 Raúl Lozano ===
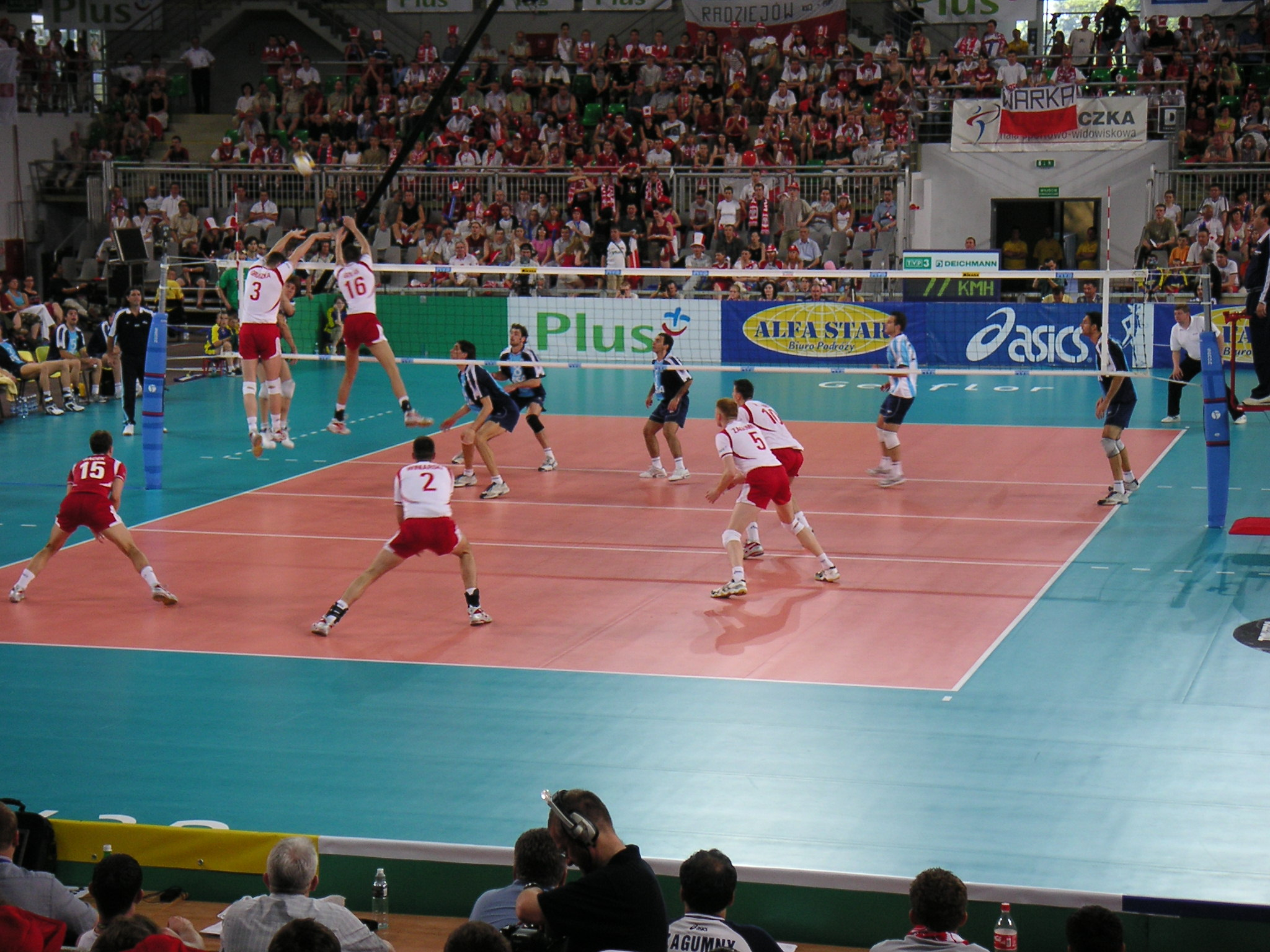
Poland vs Argentina at Łuczniczka, Bydgoszcz at the 2005 World League.

==== 2005 ====
On 17 January 2005 Raúl Lozano was chosen as coach.

On 27 May 2005 he debuted as the coach in official match against Argentina (3–1) – first meeting at 2005 World League. Polish national team won 9 of 12 matches in intercontinental round in Pool C (with Serbia and Montenegro, Greece, Argentina) and achieved promotion to final round in Serbia and Montenegro. They lost just 2 matches with Serbia and Montenegro (2–3, 2–3) and Greece (1–3).

==== 2006 ====
In 2006 Polish team won silver medal at World Championship. In final they lost against Brazil.

=== 2009–2010 Daniel Castellani ===
==== 2009 ====
On 17 January 2009, Daniel Castellani, who had previously led PGE Skra Bełchatów, was announced as the new head coach. In June 2009 Polish team played in Pool D of intercontinental round of the World League 2009. They won 5 of 12 matches, but lost all 4 matches with Brazil and 3 meetings with Finland. Poland took 11th place in general classification.

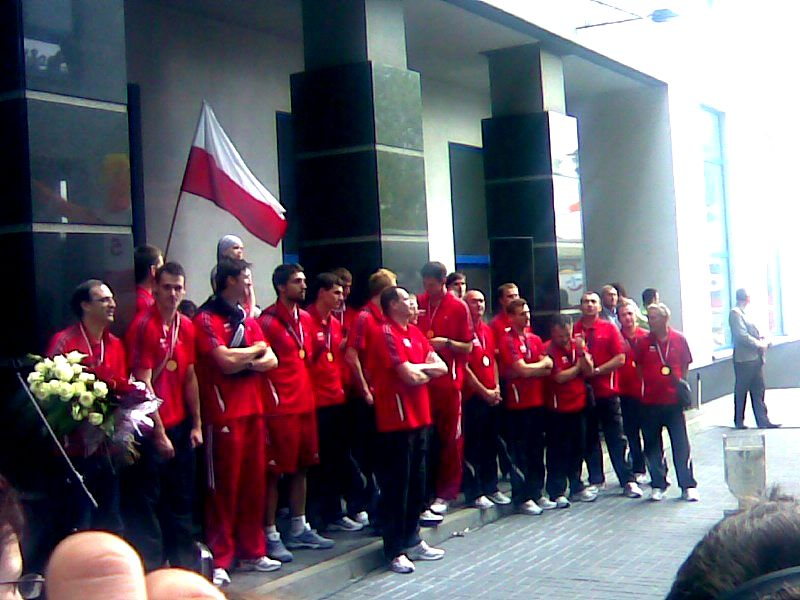
European Champions 2009 after returning to Poland.

On 3 September 2009, Poland played its first match in preliminary round Pool A of the European Championship 2009 held in Turkey. Polish players beat France in opening match 3–1. Then won with Germany (3–1) and hosts – Turkey (3–0). Poland took first place in Pool A and went to play-off round, where in Pool F beat European Champion 2007 – Spain (3–2) and won two another meetings with Slovakia (3–2) and Greece (3–0). They reached the first place in the group and Poland advanced to the final round. In semi-final played against Bulgaria and won 3–0. In final they met with France once again. This two teams opened and closed European Championship 2009. On 13 September 2009 Poland won a title of the European Champion first time in history. 2 of 8 individual award were achieved by Polish players. Paweł Zagumny was the Best setter and Most valuable player was awarded the captain and opposite hitter of Polish national team – Piotr Gruszka. On 14 September 2009 all players were awarded Knight's Cross of Polonia Restituta and coach Daniel Castellani received Officer's Cross of Polonia Restituta.

In 18–23 November 2009, Poland participated as the European Champion in World Grand Champions Cup held in Japan. The Polish team won 2 of 5 matches with Iran and Egypt. Poland took 4th place.

Polish men's national volleyball team was elected the best team of 2009 in 75th Plebiscyt Przeglądu Sportowego 2009 in Poland and Piotr Gruszka was 3rd in the Top 10 of Polish Athletes in the same competition.

==== 2010 ====
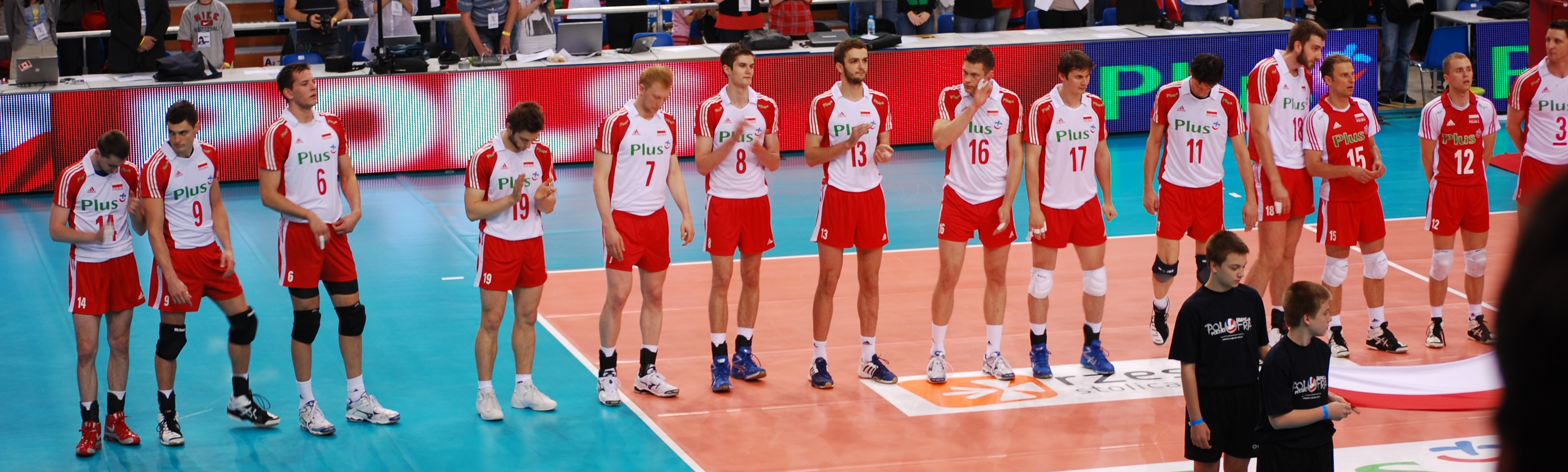
Polish national team before friendly match with France in Rzeszów on 29 May 2010. Players from left to right: Ruciak (#14), Bartman (#9), Kurek (#6), Łomacz (#19), Jarosz (#7), Kłos (#8), Mika (#13), Czarnowski (#16), Michał Bąkiewicz (#17), Żygadło (#11), Możdżonek (#18), Gacek (#15), Zatorski (#12), Gruszka (#3).

Polish national team started season with intercontinental round of the World League 2010. At the beginning they lost twice with German team (1–3 and 0–3) in Stuttgart. Then on 11–12 June beat hosts of final round – Argentina (3–1 and 3–2) in San Juan. On 18–19 June played with Cuba. Poland lost first match 2–3, but next day beat opponent 3–0. The remaining 6 matches Polish national team played in Poland. On 25–26 June, Poland beat Argentina (3–1 and 3–1) in Wrocław. They moved to Atlas Arena to Łódź, where they lost both matches with Cuba (0–3 and 1–3). Matches with Germany on 8–9 July ended Polish participated in the World League. Poland lost 2–3 and won the next day 3–1 at Spodek in Katowice.

On 25 September 2010, players of Polish national team played their first match at the World Championship 2010. They won all 3 matches in Pool F (first round) with Canada (3–0), Germany (3–2) and Serbia (3–1), which were held in Trieste, Italy. In second round Poland lost their both matches with Brazil (0–3) and Bulgaria (0–3). Poland ended Championships in place 13–18.

On 25 October 2010 after the vote of the board of Polish Volleyball Federation, Castellani was fired.

=== 2011–2013 Andrea Anastasi ===
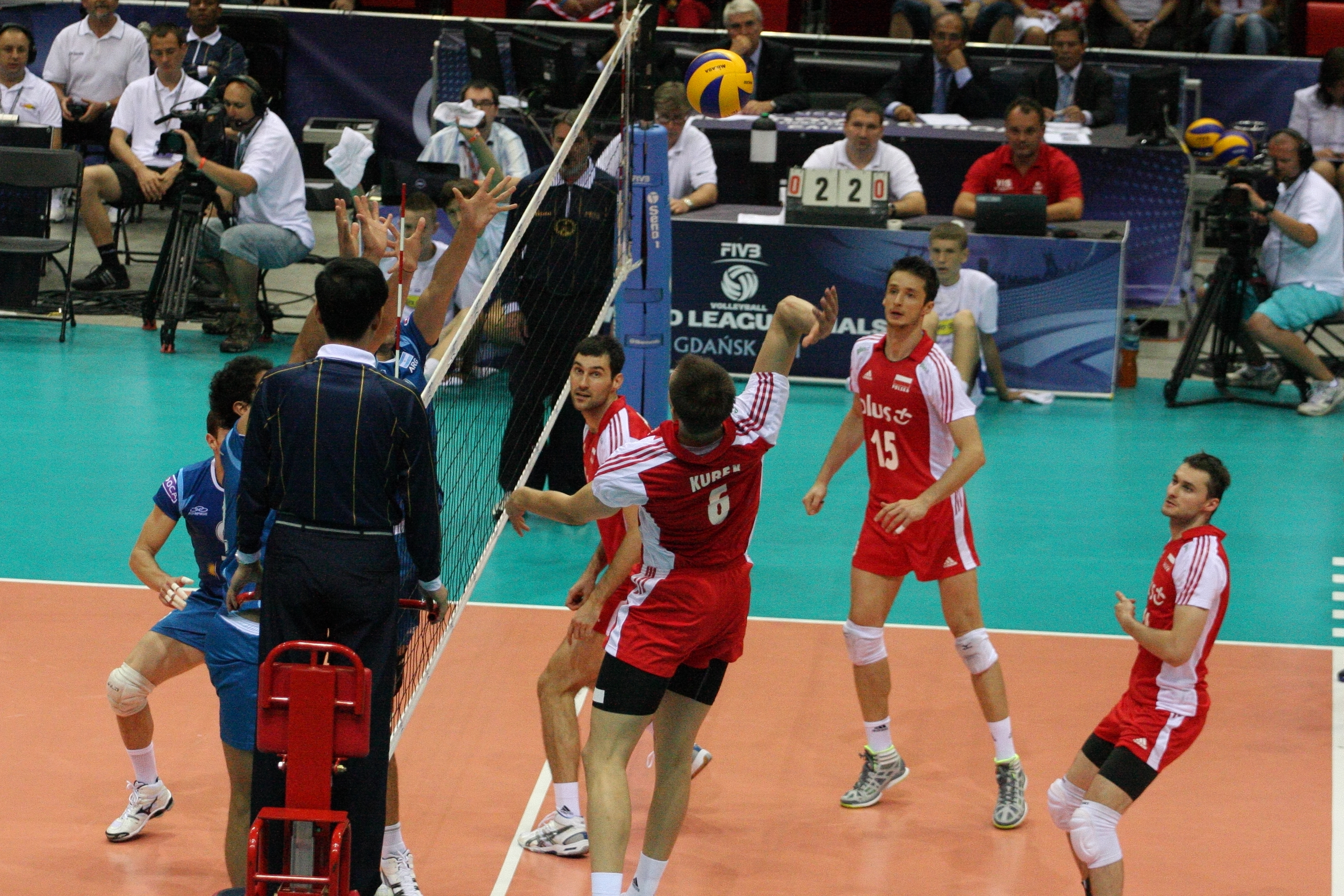
Action on the left side by outside hitter – Bartosz Kurek (#6) in 3rd place match against Argentina on World League 2011 held at Ergo Arena, Gdańsk.

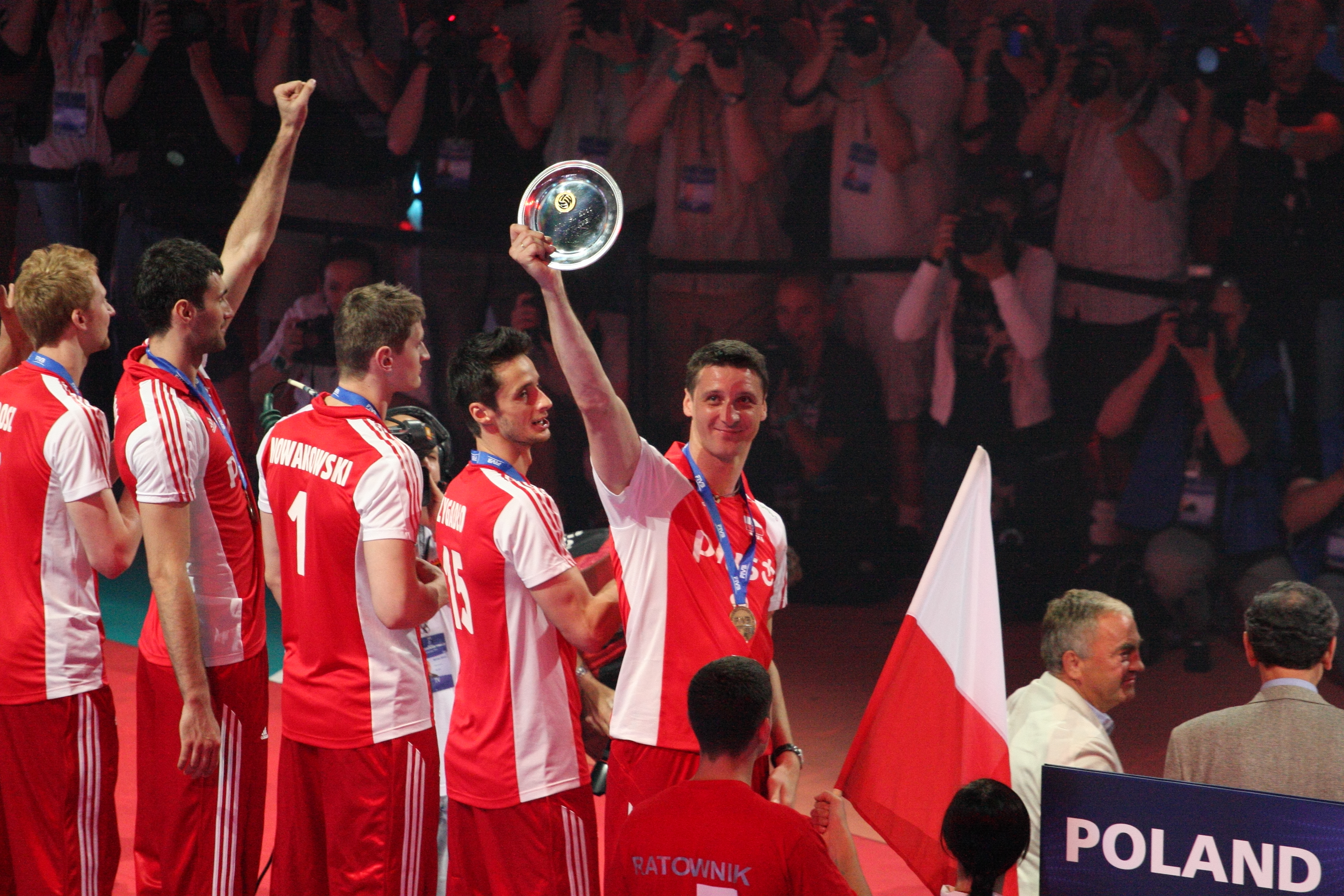
On the podium of the World League 2011 with bronze medals. The captain of Poland, opposite Piotr Gruszka is holding a trophy.

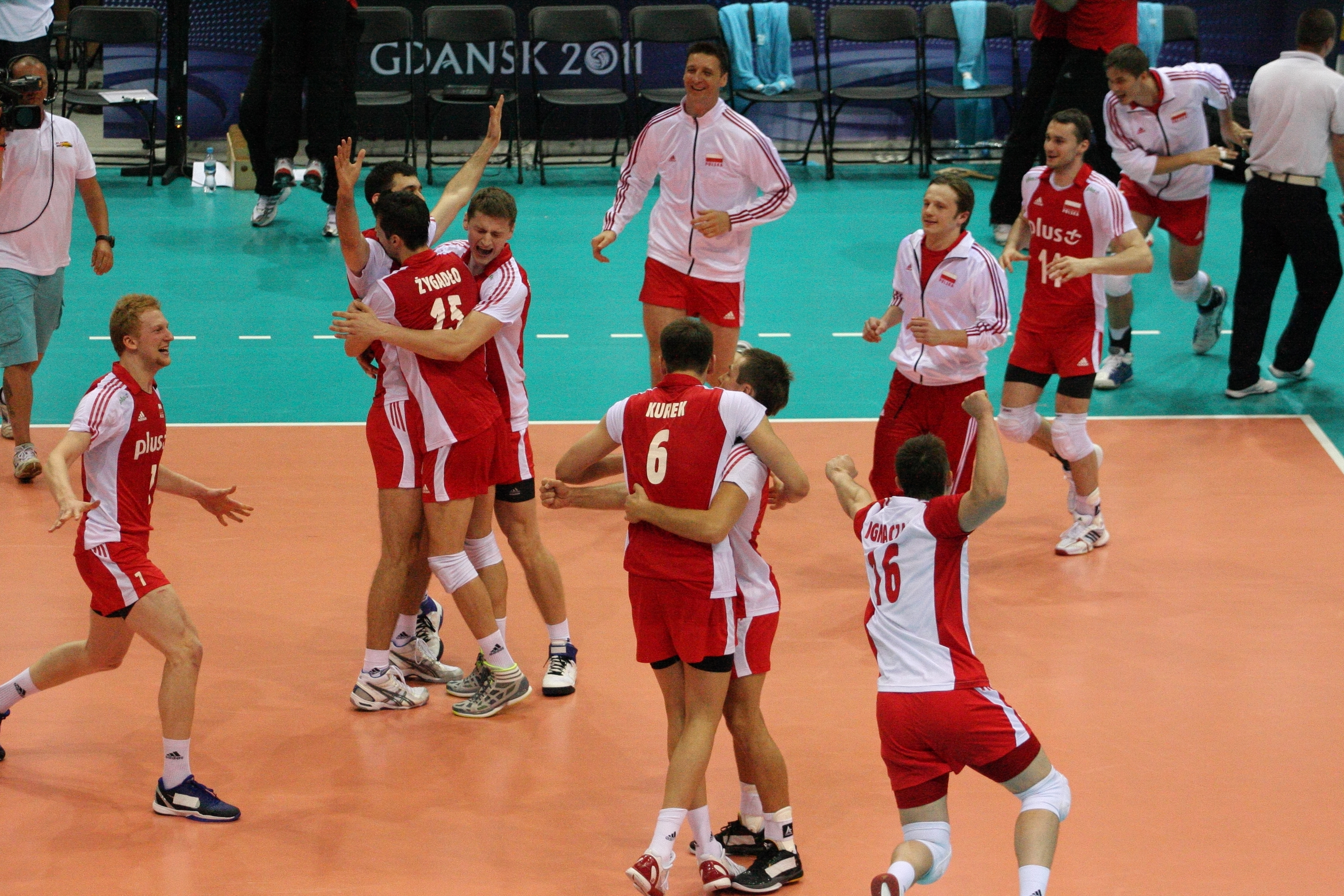
Poland after winning match ball of 3rd place match against Argentina on World League 2011 held at Ergo Arena, Gdańsk.

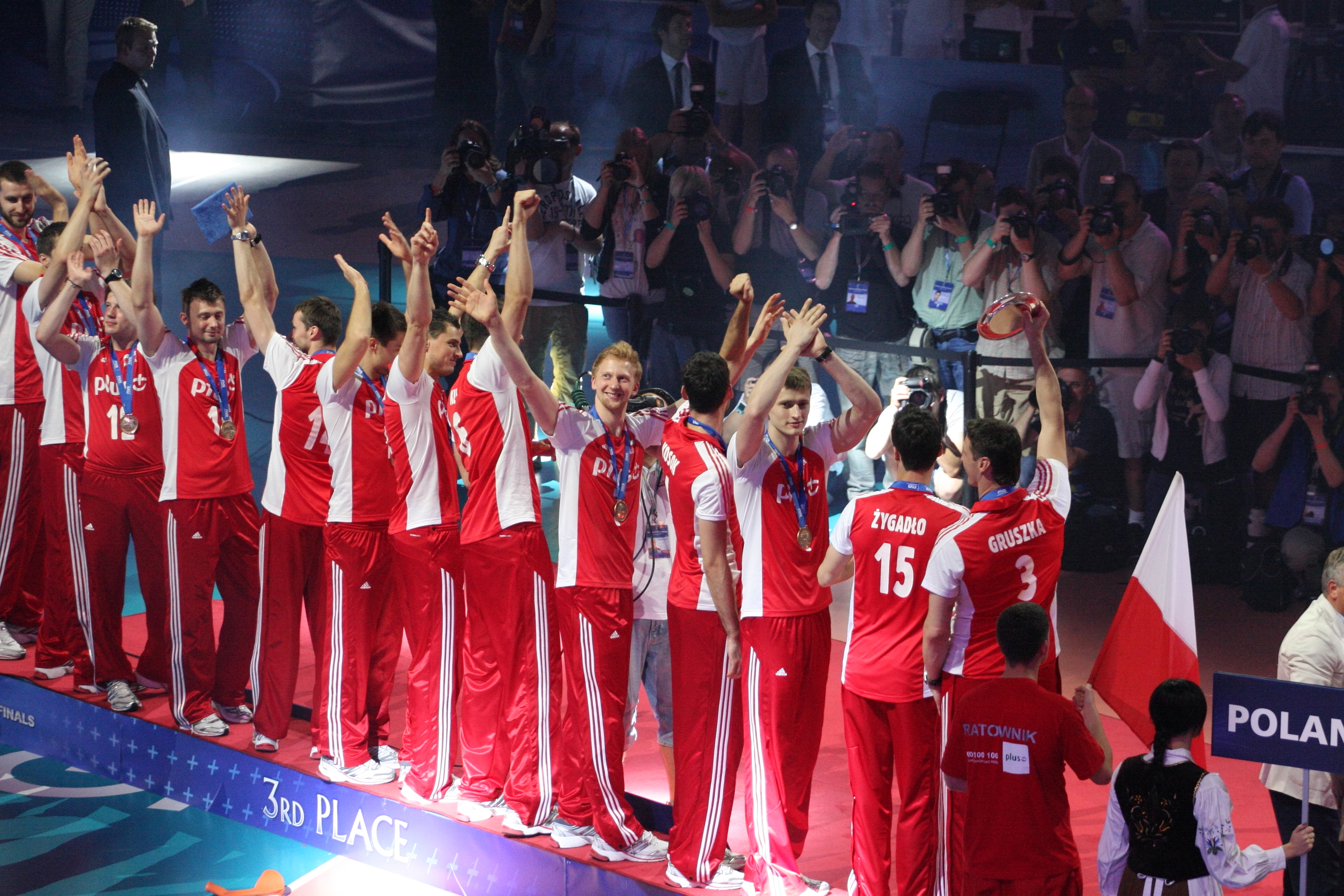
During medal ceremony as bronze medalists of World League 2011 at Ergo Arena in Gdańsk.

==== 2011 ====
After lacklustre previous year the head coach and a number of players were replaced. Andrea Anastasi began work as head coach on 23 February 2011, when Poland was ranked 11th in the FIVB ranking. His assistant was Andrea Gardini.

They started season without an important players like Zagumny, Winiarski or Wlazły. The team started with the World League 2011. Poland as host was in final tournament, which was held at Ergo Arena in Gdańsk. During a first match against Bulgaria, an opposite hitter – Zbigniew Bartman injured. Despite this Poland won after tie-break. Then Poland lost with Italy (0–3) and beat Argentina in five sets. They went to the semi-final, but lost the match against Russia (1–3). On 10 July 2011 Poland won first medal of the World League in history. Polish achieved individual awards – Bartosz Kurek was the Best scorer and Krzysztof Ignaczak the Best libero.

In the same year the Polish national team wanted to defend a title of European Champion from 2009. The team, without injured Zbigniew Bartman, won in playoff round with Czech Republic and went to quarterfinals. In Karlovy Vary beat Slovakia (3–0). Then they moved to Vienna and lost the match against Italy (0–3). Poles again played the 3rd place match. On 18 September 2011 they beat the winners of World League 2011 – Russia (3–1) and achieved their second bronze in 2011. In addition, individual award for Best server received Bartosz Kurek.

In November was the first chance to qualify for the 2012 Summer Olympics. At FIVB World Cup 2011 won 9 of 11 matches. They lost with Iran (2–3), Brazil (2–3) and Russia (2–3). Polish national team won promotion to the Olympics on 3 December 2011, when they won first two sets against Brazil (this one point gave them place on the podium). In conclusion Poland won the silver medal, and repeated the success of the FIVB World Cup 1965, where Poland achieve silver too. For the first time in the history Polish national team won three medals in one year. One of individual awards received middle-blocker Marcin Możdżonek, who was Best blocker.

Polish men's national volleyball team was elected the best team of 2011 in 77th Plebiscyt Przeglądu Sportowego 2011 in Poland and Bartosz Kurek was 2nd in the Top 10 of Polish Athletes in the same competition.

==== 2012 ====
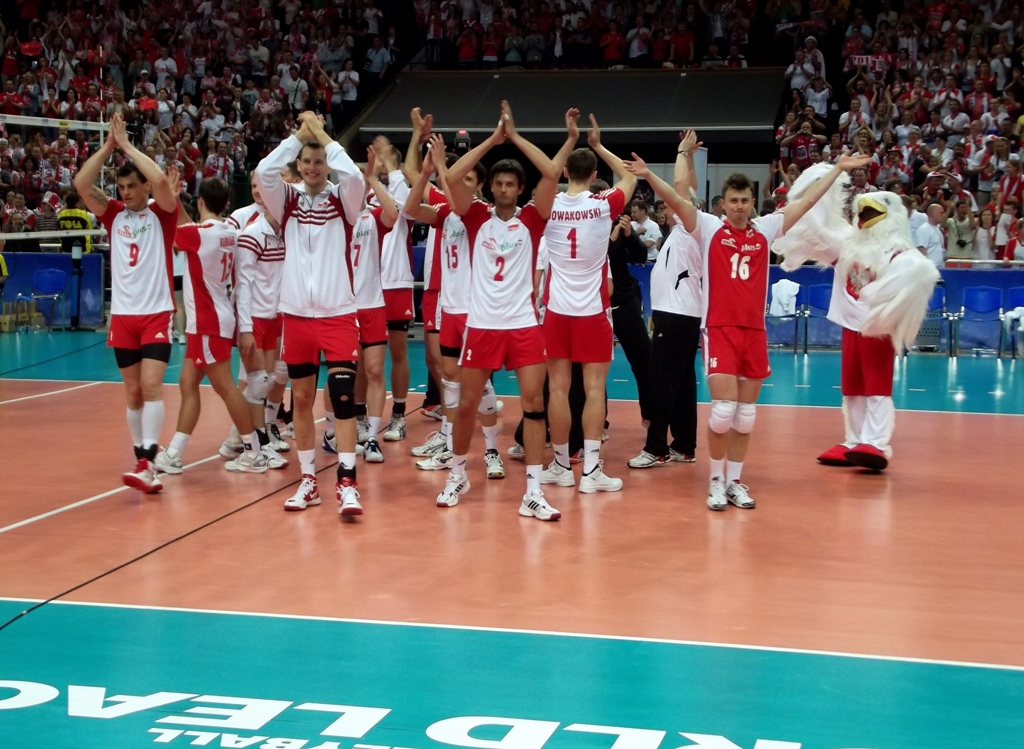
Polish team after one of the winning match in World League 2012 at Spodek in Katowice, Poland.

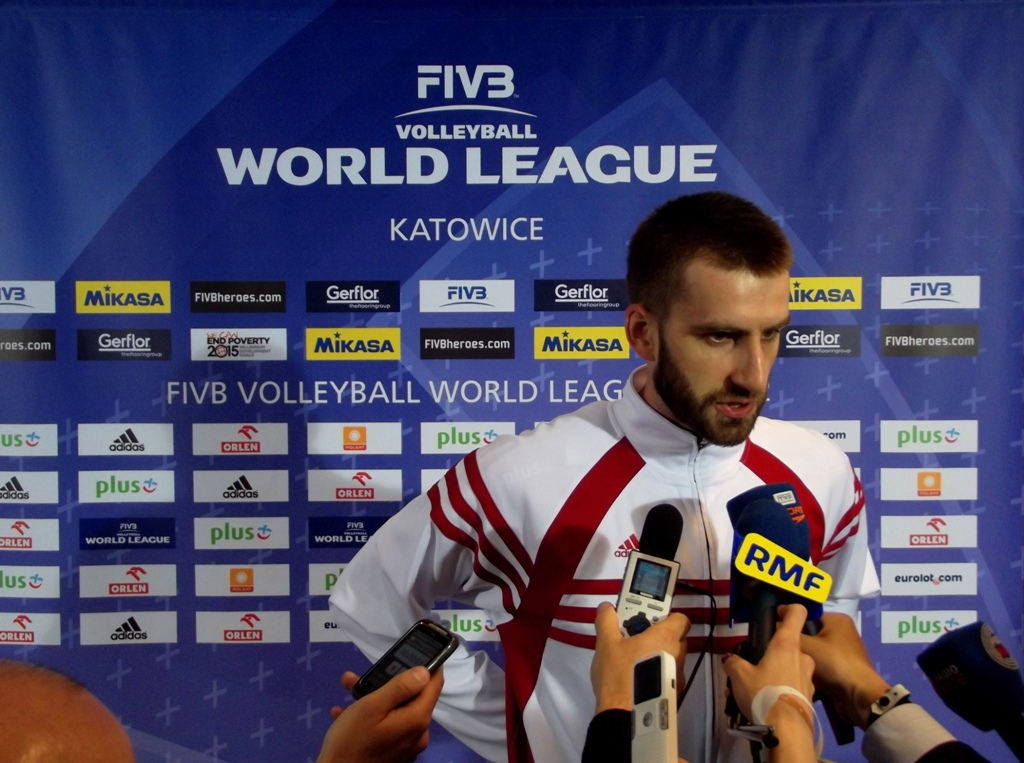
Marcin Możdżonek – Poland's captain during an interview in 2012.

The main purpose for the team were Olympics, but earlier they participated in FIVB World League 2012. They won 10 of 12 matches of intercontinental round, including 3 times won with Brazil, which was successful after many years of defeats. Poland advanced to Final Six, which was held in Sofia, Bulgaria. Polish team was in Pool F with Cuba and Brazil. They won both their group matches and went to the semi-final. They beat the host – Bulgaria and for the first time in history had a chance to play in final of World League. On 8 July 2012 won the final match against United States (3–0). It was a second medal of World League for Polish team and the first gold. Polish players received 4 of 8 individual awards. Best spiker was Zbigniew Bartman, Best blocker – Marcin Możdżonek, Best libero – Krzysztof Ignaczak and Most valuable player – Bartosz Kurek.

On 29 July 2012 the team played their first Pool A match at the 20123 London Summer Olympics against Italy (3–1). Polish national team won 3 of 5 pool matches, but lost with Bulgaria and Australia. They went to quarterfinal, but lost it after 3–1 match against future Olympic Champions – Russia. Despite the defeat, Krzysztof Ignaczak was the Best receiver of the 2012 Summer Olympics (four years earlier, the same award received another Polish player – Michał Winiarski).

Poland had the success and failure of this season, but despite this they were elected the best team of 2012 in 78th Plebiscyt Przeglądu Sportowego 2012 in Poland.

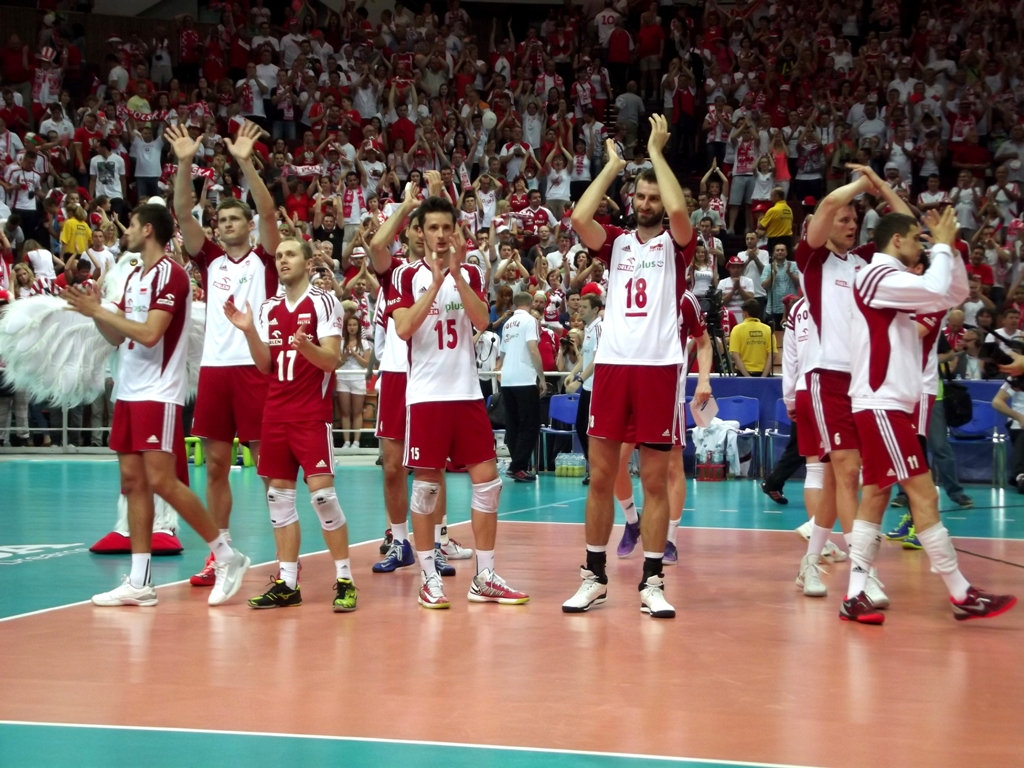
Polish players after the winning match Poland – United States of the World League 2013 at Spodek, Katowice on 5 July 2013. In the foreground from left: Winiarski (#2), Nowakowski (#1), Zatorski (#17), Kosok (#4), Żygadło (#15), Możdżonek (#18), Kurek (#6) and Drzyzga (#11).

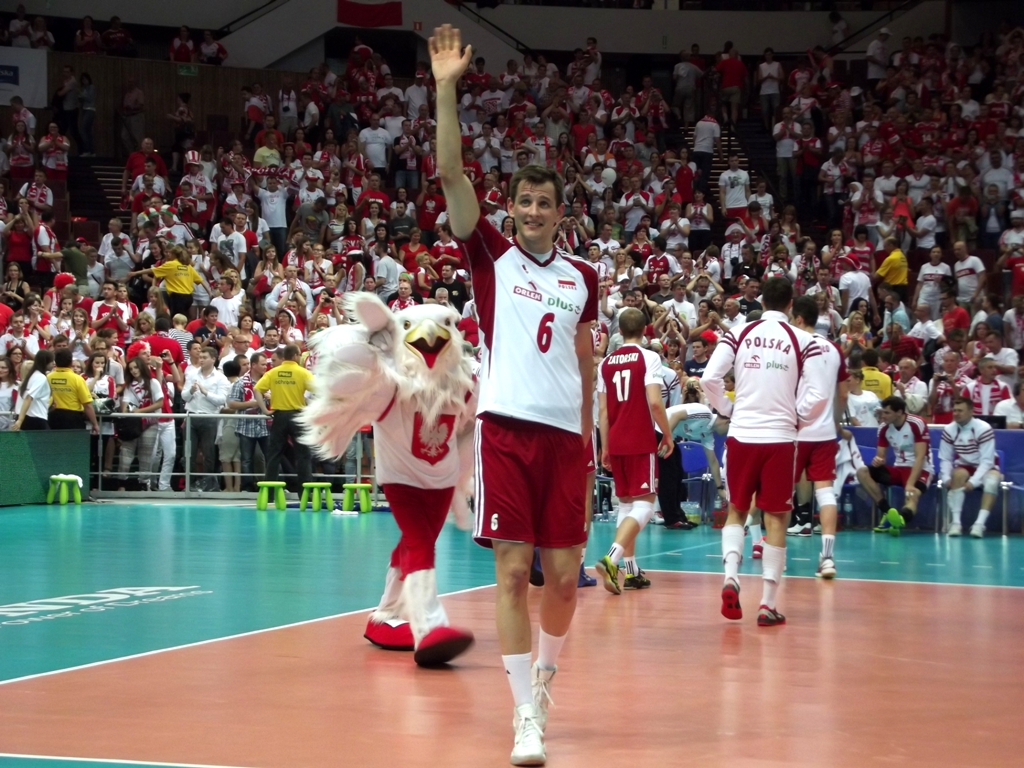
Bartosz Kurek in match Poland – United States (World League 2013).

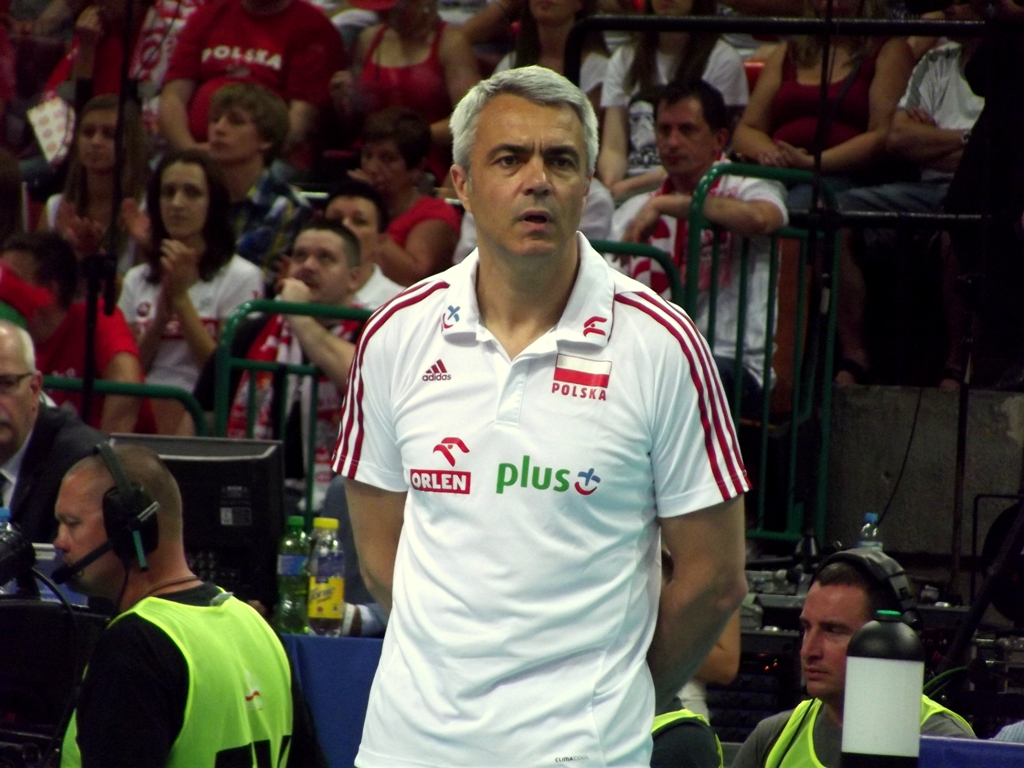
Andrea Anastasi – head coach in 2011–2013.

==== 2013 ====
The team started season on 24 May 2013 when they played friendly match with Serbia (3–0) in Milicz. Next day, on 25 May the two national teams played their second match in Twardogóra, which was won by guests (1–3).

Poland began its participation in the World League 2013 losing their first four matches. They lost twice with Brazil at Torwar Hall on 7 June (1–3) and after tie-brak at Atlas Arena on 9 June. Then Polish players lost next two aligned matches on 21 and 23 June against France, which have been resolved after tie-breaks. On 28 June 2013 Polish team played their first match with Argentine team (3–2) at Łuczniczka, Bydgoszcz and two days later their second meeting (3–1) at Ergo Arena in Gdańsk. The heroes of winning matches with Argentine players were Jarosz and Kurek. On 5 and 7 July, Polish national team beat United States team (3–2) at Spodek, Katowice and (3–1) at Centennial Hall in Wrocław, after great game of Jakub Jarosz. Poland didn't continue their series of victories. On 12 July 2013 lost (0–3) match against Bulgaria and one day later lost dramatic match after tie-break despite the determination of the whole team. Unstoppable was the main scorer of Bulgaria – Tsvetan Sokolov. At Palace of Culture and Sports, Varna lost their last two matches of intercontinental round and ended their game in World League 2013.

In October 2013 Andrea Anastasi was fired as coach of the Polish national team. The reason for this decision were unsuccessful Polish losses in 2013 and getting worse team game. Poland, while working of Andrea Anastasi, took 3rd place in the FIVB World Rankings. It was promotion from 11th place in early 2011. Anastasi has announced that he won't be coach of any national team at the World Championship 2014 held in Poland because of respect for his former players. He decided to stay in Poland and has been working with Polish club Lotos Trefl Gdańsk.

=== 2014–2016 Stéphane Antiga ===
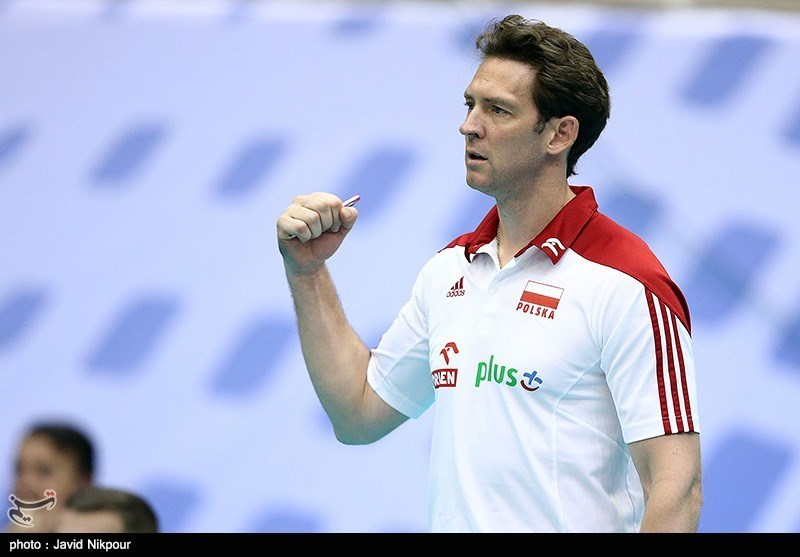
Stephane Antiga, head coach who led Poland to title of 2014 World Champions

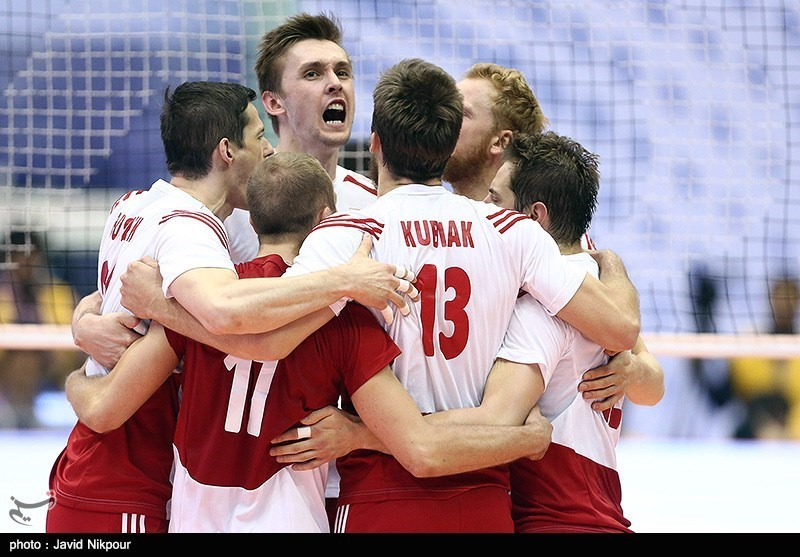
Poland during the FIVB World League 2014

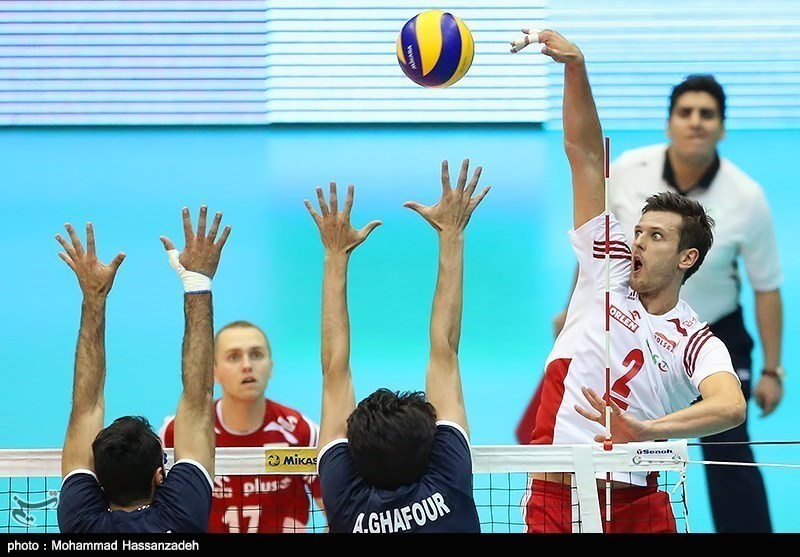
Left-wing attack from Winiarski at FIVB World League 2014 against Iran

==== 2014 ====
On 24 October 2013, was announced new head coach Stéphane Antiga. He began his work after the end of the league season 2013/2014, because he played for PGE Skra Bełchatów and he had to complete his career as a player. His first tournament as Poland's head coach was the CEV European Championship 2015 qualification. Poland won 5 out of their 6 matches, beating Macedonia and Latvia twice each and Slovenia once. The Polish national team qualified for the CEV European Championship 2015.

After this, the team took part in the FIVB World League 2014. They won 6 of 12 matches in the intercontinental round, but didn't qualify for the Final Six. They lacked one set against Brazil for a place in the final tournament. The team went on to make preparations at training camps in Bełchatów, Capbreton (France) and Spała before the World Championship 2014. On 16–18 August 2014 the 12th Memorial of Hubert Jerzy Wagner was held at Kraków Arena, Kraków. On the first day, after losing a match with Bulgaria (2–3), coach Antiga announced the list of players who would represent the Polish national team at the World Championship 2014. He eliminated one of the major players of previous years: Bartosz Kurek. In the following matches of tournament Mariusz Wlazły was unable to play because of a sprained ankle. Despite this, Poland defeated China and for the first time since 2011, beat Russia. The Polish team took 2nd place and two of the Polish players received individual awards: Piotr Nowakowski as Best server and Krzysztof Ignaczak as Best libero.

On 30 August 2014, Poland played their historic match at the National Stadium in Warsaw against Serbia as opening meeting of the 2014 World Championship. It was the opening match of the World Championship 2014 in Poland. Polish team won 3–0 and with attendance over 62,000 audience. In their first group, Pool A, Poland won all 5 matches and lost just one set with Cameroon. In their second group, Pool F, the host team won 3 of their 4 matches. On 10 September 2014, they lost to the United States (1–3), but then beat the national teams of Italy (3–1), Iran (3–2) and France (3–2). Poland took second place in Group F. The breakdown in the next stage of the tournament was decided by drawing lots. Poland went into group H with Brazil and Russia. Some commentators and fans called Pool H the "Group of Death", but it was a happy result for the home team. The Polish national team won two dramatic matches after tie-breaks at Atlas Arena in Łódź. On 16 September 2014 they beat Brazil. Poland's main scorer in the match was Mariusz Wlazły, who gained 31 points for his team. Two days later, Poland needed just two winning sets for promotion to the semi-final. Poland beat Russia and took first place in the group. On 21 September 2014 the Polish team won the semi-final match against Germany, which guaranteed for Poland their third ever medal at the World Championship. On 21 September 2014 Poland won the title of World Champion 2014, for the first time in 40 years. Poland beat Brazil (3–1). Polish players received 3 of 8 the individual awards in the tournament: Karol Kłos as Best blocker, Mariusz Wlazły as Best opposite and Most valuable player. After victory Poland have risen two places in FIVB ranking and has been taken 3rd place.

It was announced that in 2015, the Polish national team will take part in the World League, European Championship (Bulgaria/Italy), World Cup (Japan), and the first edition of the European Games, which will be held in Baku, Azerbaijan.

Historic result at World Championship brought the team their next title of the Best Team of 2014 in Plebiscite of Przegląd Sportowy 2014 in Poland. Head coach Stephane Antiga was awarded a title of the Coach of the year 2014 ex-aequo with Łukasz Kruczek. A title of Debutant of the year 2014 was awarded Mateusz Mika. Mariusz Wlazły was 2nd in the Top 10 of Polish Athletes in the same competition.

==== 2015 ====
Head coach Stephane Antiga appointed players to the Polish national team on 2 April 2015. The new chosen captain of the team was Karol Kłos, who replaced a previous one – Michał Winiarski. During the matches of intercontinental round of World League, the captain of Polish team was Michał Kubiak, because of Kłos' injury.

They began season with intercontinental round of World League 2015. First match with Russia, Poland won 3–0. Most valuable player of match was Mateusz Bieniek, who played his first match in senior national team. After break to national team returned a few players – Bartosz Kurek, Jakub Jarosz, Grzegorz Łomacz, Piotr Gacek, Wojciech Grzyb. Next day, Poland beat Russia in five-set match (3–2). Most valuable player of match was Bartosz Kurek (23 pts). On 5 June 2015 Poland beat Iran (3–1). Bartosz Kurek scored 30 pts and he was Most valuable player of match. Next day, Poland won another meeting with Iran (3–2) and MVP was chosen Michał Kubiak. On 12 June 2015 Poland lost first match with United States (3–2) after almost 3 hours meeting. It was first lost match of Poland since 10 September 2014, when they lost with U.S. national team at World Championship. Next day, Poland also lost with American players (3–1). After spending one week in United States, Poland moved to Russian ground – Kazan, where they won two matches against Russia (3–1) and (3–2). Then they flew to Tehran. After a spectacular meeting, Poland lost first match on 26 June (3–2). Two days later, Polish national team beat Iran (3–1). Polish team spent three weeks in tour and they came back to Poland on last matches of intercontinental round with United States. On 3 July 2015 Poland beat USA in tie-break and achieved two points, which gave Polish team a qualification to final round of World League 2015 in Rio de Janeiro. Next day, they lost match (1–3). Poland qualified for the Pool J with Serbia and Italy. On 17 July Poland won match over Italy (3–1) and qualified to semi-final. Main leader in this important meeting was Michał Kubiak, who scored 19 pts. Next day, Serbia won over Poland (2–3), but Polish team gained 1 pt and took first place in Pool J. On 18 July, Poland lost semi-final with France (2–3). On 19 July Poland did not achieve bronze, because of lost with USA (0–3). Polish team had problems with own errors. Poland took 4th place in edition of the World League 2015. Polish players achieved two individual awards – Michał Kubiak was one of the Best outside spiker and Paweł Zatorski was Best libero. In 2–9 August all players, whose were in final round in Rio de Janeiro went to training camp in Arłamów and two players joined to team (Włodarczyk, Kłos). Then the team without Wrona was training in Spała.

Polish national team is going to take part in 2015 Memorial of Hubert Jerzy Wagner in Toruń. First day, they beat Japan (3–0). In the following days Poland beat Iran (3–1) and France (3–2). Poland won 2015 Memorial of Hubert Jerzy Wagner for sixth time and Polish players achieved five individual awards – Best spiker was Dawid Konarski, Best server was Mateusz Bieniek, Best blocker was Piotr Nowakowski, Best libero was Paweł Zatorski and Most valuable player was a captain Michał Kubiak.

Polish players started their visit in Japan from training camp in Osaka and then they went to Hammamatsu, where they are playing their first round matches. Poland started a journey at World Cup 2015 on 8 September, when they beat Tunisia (3–0). In following day, Polish players beat Russia (3–1) and in both matches Most Valuable Player of match was chosen Bartosz Kurek. During third set of the meeting with Russia, Polish setter Grzegorz Łomacz twisted his ankle. On 10 September 2015 Poland contained their winning with Argentina (3–1) and MVP was Michał Kubiak. On 12 September, Polish team beat Iran (3–2) and best player on the court was chosen Mateusz Mika. On 13 September Poland played their last match in first round in Hamamatsu with Venezuela (3–1). MVP of match was Dawid Konarski, who scored 22 points. Poland won all five matches in first round of World Cup 2015, but lost one point in overall table. In second round Poland beat Canada (3–1), Egypt (3–0), and Australia (3–0). After eight victories without any defeat, Poland moved to Tokyo. On 21 September 2015, two previously undefeated teams met in first match of third round. Poland beat United States (3–1) and Polish captain Michał Kubiak played his best match in World Cup. Then Poland won match with host team Japan, but they had problems with them in first set (3–1). Poland won 10 of 10 matches and the last day on 23 September met with Italy. They lost 3–1 and they did not achieve one point so Poland took 3rd place in tournament, which did not give Poland a qualification to 2016 Summer Olympics. Poland won 10 of 11 matches, but because of points and ratio of set, achieved only bronze medal without Olympic qualification.

==== 2016 ====
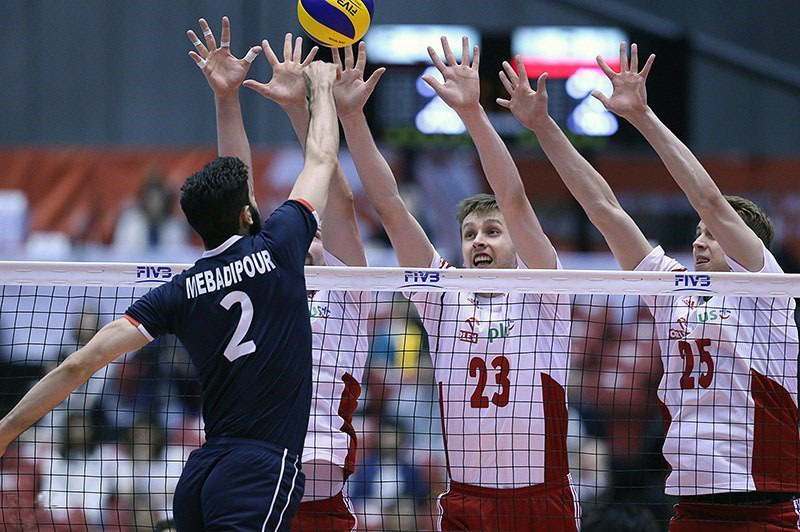
Poland during the match of World Olympic Qualification Tournament with Iran on 4 June 2016.

From 5 to 10 January 2016, Polish team took part in 2016 Summer Olympics – European qualification. Poland was in Pool A, where they won two matches, with Serbia (3–1) and Belgium, lost one with Germany (2–3). In semi-final Poland lost with France (0–3) and lost chance to qualify to Olympics. On 10 January 2016 Poland won 3rd place match with Germany (3–2). Poland was qualified to World Olympic Qualification Tournament and keep chance to gain qualification to 2016 Summer Olympics.

On 28 May 2016, Poland started the battle in World Olympic Qualification Tournament. After 5 victories in first 5 matches (with Canada 3–2, France 3–2, Japan 3–0, China 3–2, Venezuela 3–0 and Iran 1–3) Poland achieved qualification to 2016 Rio Summer Olympics on 2 June 2016.

Poland beat 4 of 5 opponents in group stage at 2016 Summer Olympics (lost only to Russia after tie break). They took second place in Group B and were qualified to quarterfinals. Due to the draw, Poland next met the USA. On 17 August 2016 Americans beat Polish players (0–3) and Poland took 5th place. This was their fourth Olympics with the same result in a row.

=== 2017: Ferdinando De Giorgi ===
The contract of Stephane Antiga lasted to the end of December 2016, and the Federation decided not to renew it. In October 2016, Polish Volleyball Federation decided to choose a new head coach of Poland. There were three main candidates: Radostin Stoychev, Mauro Berruto and Ferdinando De Giorgi. On 16 December 2016, it was announced that Ferdinando De Giorgi took over the Polish team.

==== 2017 ====
De Giorgi made his debut as a head coach of Poland in friendly match with Iran without losing any set, on 20 May 2017. The match was a goodbye match for notable libero Krzysztof Ignaczak, who officially ended up his career in national team. Then Poland took part in intercontinental round of the 2017 FIVB World League. In first week, Poland beat Brazil (3–2) and Italy (3–1), but lost match with Iran (1–3). Overall, Poland won 4 and lost 5 meetings. They lost a chance to advance to Final Six after losing match with United States (1–3) on 18 June. In final standing Poland took 8th place.

Poland took part in annual friendly tournament 2017 Memorial of Hubert Jerzy Wagner in 11–13 August 2017. On day 1, they lost with France (2–3) and next day they beat Canada led by their previous head coach Stephane Antiga (3–0). These two matches were played by main players of team without any relevant changes in squad. In last match with Russia, coach De Giorgi decided to check extended squad and young players. Poland easily lost first two sets and made a contact in third set. Poland won after tie-break and achieved 7th win of the Memorial of Hubert Jerzy Wagner. The victory was provided mainly by some newbies in senior national team Łukasz Kaczmarek, Jakub Kochanowski, Bartłomiej Lemański and also by few young players, who debuted in previous year like Artur Szalpuk. Head coach De Giorgi had an intention to announce team roster for upcoming 2017 European Championship, but after match with Russia he changed his mind and said he is going to do it few days later.

Poland took part in the 2017 European Championships. The national team opened Championships with loss at National Stadium, Warsaw in front of more than 60.000 fans (with Serbia). Then they won twice (3–0) with Finland and Estonia. On 30 August 2017 Polish national team was beaten by Slovenia in playoffs. The atmosphere in the team was not the best and the head coach failed to draw conclusions from the defeat, so PZPS fired Ferdinando De Giorgi on 20 September.

=== 2018–2021: Vital Heynen ===
PZPS chose a new head coach out of three candidates: Piotr Gruszka, Andrzej Kowal and Vital Heynen. On 7 February 2018 Heynen was chosen in explicit voting. Heynen has also agreed to the condition that the PZPS can dismiss him at the end of any season without paying any compensation. In 2018, he led the Polish national team to victory at the FIVB Volleyball World Championship. His other successes with the team include silver medal at the World Cup and bronze medals at the Nations League and the European Volleyball Championship in 2019.

=== 2022–present: Nikola Grbić ===
On 12 January 2022, Nikola Grbić was selected as the coach of the Poland Volleyball National Team. In 2023, he led the Polish team to a triple victory at three consecutive tournaments: 2023 Nations League, 2023 European Championship, and 2023 Volleyball Olympic Qualification Tournament.

At the 2024 Summer Olympics, the Poland national volleyball team won silver medal losing in the final to France. This marked the first time in 48 years since the team's last Olympic medal in Montreal 1976 when Poland won gold.

== Statistics ==
=== Olympic Games ===
Champions Second place Third place

Summer Olympics record
Year	Round	Position	GP	MW	ML	SW	SL
(Japan) 1964	Did not qualify						
(Mexico) 1968	Round robin	5th	9	6	3	18	11
(West Germany) 1972	9th–12th places	9th	6	2	4	11	12
(Canada) 1976	Final	Gold	6	6	0	18	9
(Soviet Union) 1980	Semifinals	4th	6	3	3	12	11
(United States) 1984	Boycotted						
(South Korea) 1988	Did not qualify						
(Spain) 1992	Did not qualify						
(United States) 1996	Preliminary round	11th	5	0	5	1	15
(Australia) 2000	Did not qualify						
(Greece) 2004	Quarterfinals	5th	6	3	3	10	12
(China) 2008	Quarterfinals	5th	6	4	2	14	9
(United Kingdom) 2012	Quarterfinals	5th	6	3	3	11	10
(Brazil) 2016	Quarterfinals	5th	6	4	2	14	8
(Japan) 2020	Quarterfinals	5th	6	4	2	16	7
(France) 2024	Final	Silver	6	4	2	13	11
(United States) 2028	Qualified						
(Australia) 2032	To be determined						
Total	1 Title	11/16	68	39	29	152	119

=== World Championship ===
Champions Second place Third place

World Championship record
Year	Round	Position	GP	MW	ML	SW	SL
(Czechoslovakia) 1949	Final group	5th	7	2	5	9	15
(Soviet Union) 1952	7th–11th places	7th	7	5	2	17	6
(France) 1956	Final group	Fourth place	10	7	3	23	11
(Brazil) 1960	Final group	Fourth place	10	7	3	24	14
(Soviet Union) 1962	Final group	6th	11	5	6	23	19
(Czechoslovakia) 1966	Final group	6th	10	6	4	22	18
(Bulgaria) 1970	Final group	5th	11	7	4	24	21
(Mexico) 1974	Final group	Champions	11	11	0	33	10
(Italy) 1978	5th–8th places	8th	9	5	4	18	16
(Argentina) 1982	5th–8th places	6th	9	5	4	17	14
(France) 1986	9th–12th places	9th	8	4	4	15	12
(Brazil) 1990	Did not qualify						
(Greece) 1994	Did not qualify						
(Japan) 1998	Preliminary round	17th	3	1	2	4	6
(Argentina) 2002	Second round	9th	6	4	2	15	10
(Japan) 2006	Final	Second place	11	10	1	30	6
(Italy) 2010	Second round	13th	5	3	2	9	9
(Poland) 2014	Final	Champions	13	12	1	37	15
(Italy) (Bulgaria) 2018	Final	Champions	12	9	3	32	14
(Poland) (Slovenia) 2022	Final	Second place	7	6	1	19	8
(Philippines) 2025	Semifinals	Third place	7	6	1	18	6
(Poland) 2027	Qualified as host						
(Qatar) 2029	Future event						
Total	3 Titles	19/21	167	110	69	389	230

=== World Cup ===
Champions Second place Third place

World Cup record
Year	Round	Position	GP	MW	ML	SW	SL
(Poland) 1965	Final group	2nd	7	6	1	20	9
(East Germany) 1969	7th–11th places	8th	6	3	3	12	9
(Japan) 1977	Final group	4th	8	6	2	18	13
(Japan) 1981	Round robin	4th	7	4	3	14	13
(Japan) 1985	Did not qualify						
(Japan) 1989	Did not qualify						
(Japan) 1991	Did not qualify						
(Japan) 1995	Did not qualify						
(Japan) 1999	Did not qualify						
(Japan) 2003	Did not qualify						
(Japan) 2007	Did not qualify						
(Japan) 2011	Round robin	2nd	11	8	3	30	15
(Japan) 2015	Round robin	3rd	11	10	1	31	11
(Japan) 2019	Round robin	2nd	11	9	2	30	9
Total		7/14	61	46	15	155	79

=== World Grand Champions Cup ===
Champions Second place Third place

World Grand Champions Cup record
Year	Round	Position	GP	MW	ML	SW	SL
(Japan) 1993	Did not qualify						
(Japan) 1997	Did not qualify						
(Japan) 2001	Did not qualify						
(Japan) 2005	Did not qualify						
(Japan) 2009	Round robin	4th	5	2	3	9	10
(Japan) 2013	Did not qualify						
(Japan) 2017	Did not qualify						
Total		1/7	5	2	3	9	10

=== World League ===
Champions Second place Third place

World League record
Year	Round	Position	GP	MW	ML	SW	SL
(Japan) 1990	Did not participate						
(Italy) 1991	Did not participate						
(Italy) 1992	Did not participate						
(Brazil) 1993	Did not participate						
(Italy) 1994	Did not participate						
(Brazil) 1995	Did not participate						
(Netherlands) 1996	Did not participate						
(Russia) 1997	Did not participate						
(Italy) 1998	Intercontinental round	10th	12	3	9	12	33
(Argentina) 1999	Intercontinental round	8th	12	5	7	21	25
(Netherlands) 2000	Intercontinental round	8th	12	5	7	21	24
(Poland) 2001	Final round	7th	15	8	7	29	30
(Brazil) 2002	Final round	5th	15	9	6	32	27
(Spain) 2003	Intercontinental round	9th	12	6	6	24	21
(Italy) 2004	Intercontinental round	7th	12	6	6	22	24
(Serbia and Montenegro) 2005	Semifinals	4th	15	10	5	39	27
(Russia) 2006	Intercontinental round	7th	12	9	3	31	19
(Poland) 2007	Semifinals	4th	16	14	2	44	19
(Brazil) 2008	Final round	5th	14	9	5	34	23
(Serbia) 2009	Intercontinental round	9th	12	5	7	18	26
(Argentina) 2010	Intercontinental round	10th	12	6	6	24	24
(Poland) 2011	Semifinals	3rd	17	9	8	31	29
(Bulgaria) 2012	Final	1st	16	14	2	45	15
(Argentina) 2013	Intercontinental round	11th	10	4	6	21	24
(Italy) 2014	Intercontinental round	8th	12	6	6	21	23
(Brazil) 2015	Semifinals	4th	16	9	7	37	33
(Poland) 2016	Final round	5th	11	4	7	15	27
(Brazil) 2017	Intercontinental round	8th	9	4	5	17	19
Total	1 Title	20/28	262	145	117	538	492

=== Nations League ===
Champions Second place Third place

Nations League record
Year	Round	Position	GP	MW	ML	SW	SL
(France) 2018	Final round	5th	17	10	7	33	25
(United States) 2019	Semifinals	Third place	19	14	5	48	31
(Italy) 2021	Final	Second place	17	13	4	43	14
(Italy) 2022	Semifinals	Third place	15	12	3	39	15
(Poland) 2023	Final	Champions	15	13	2	39	21
(Poland) 2024	Semifinals	Third place	15	12	3	39	14
(China) 2025	Final	Champions	15	11	4	39	20
(China) 2026	Final	Champions	15	13	2	43	18
Total	3 Titles	8/8	128	98	30	323	158

=== European Championship ===
Champions Second place Third place

European Championship record
Year	Round	Position	GP	MW	ML	SW	SL
(Italy) 1948	Did not participate						
(Bulgaria) 1950	Round robin	6th	5	0	5	3	15
(France) 1951	Did not participate						
(Romania) 1955	Final group	6th	9	4	5	17	19
(Czechoslovakia) 1958	Final group	6th	11	7	4	25	15
(Romania) 1963	Final group	6th	9	5	4	18	16
(Turkey) 1967	Final group	Third place	10	7	3	25	13
(Italy) 1971	Final group	6th	8	3	5	14	16
(Socialist Federal Republic of Yugoslavia) 1975	Final group	Second place	7	5	2	17	9
(Finland) 1977	Final	Second place	7	5	2	18	9
(France) 1979	Final group	Second place	7	6	1	18	8
(Bulgaria) 1981	Final group	Second place	7	6	1	18	5
(East Germany) 1983	Final group	Second place	7	6	1	19	9
(Netherlands) 1985	Final group	4th	7	4	3	14	11
(Belgium) 1987	Did not qualify						
(Sweden) 1989	5th–8th places	7th	7	4	3	15	11
(Germany) 1991	5th–8th places	7th	7	4	3	14	15
(Finland) 1993	5th–8th places	7th	7	3	4	14	14
(Greece) 1995	5th–8th places	6th	7	3	4	10	12
(Netherlands) 1997	Did not qualify						
(Austria) 1999	Did not qualify						
(Czech Republic) 2001	5th–8th places	5th	7	5	2	15	13
(Germany) 2003	5th–8th places	5th	7	4	3	17	12
(Italy) 2005	Preliminary round	5th	5	3	2	10	7
(Russia) 2007	Second round	11th	6	1	5	8	16
(Turkey) 2009	Final	Champions	8	8	0	24	7
(Austria) (Czech Republic) 2011	Semifinals	Third place	7	4	3	14	12
(Denmark) (Poland) 2013	Playoffs	9th	4	2	2	9	8
(Bulgaria) (Italy) 2015	Quarterfinals	5th	4	3	1	11	4
(Poland) 2017	Playoffs	10th	4	2	2	6	6
(Belgium) (France) (Netherlands) (Slovenia) 2019	Semifinals	Third place	9	8	1	25	4
(Poland) (Czech Republic) (Estonia) (Finland) 2021	Semifinals	Third place	9	8	1	25	7
(Italy) (Bulgaria) (North Macedonia) (Israel) 2023	Final	Champions	9	9	0	27	4
(Bulgaria) (Finland) (Italy) (Romania) 2026	Final	Champions	9	8	1	26	4
(N/A) / (N/A) / (N/A) / (Montenegro) 2028	Qualified						
Total	3 Titles	29/35	201	129	72	451	294

=== European League ===
- 2014 – 6th place
- 2015 – (bronze) Bronze medal

=== European Games ===
- 2015 Baku — 4th place

=== World University Games ===
- 2013 Russia – (silver) Silver medal
- 2019 Italy – (silver) Silver medal
- 2021 China – (silver) Silver medal
- 2025 Germany – (gold) Gold medal

=== Hubert Jerzy Wagner Memorial ===
- 2003 Olsztyn – (silver) Silver medal
- 2004 Olsztyn – (silver) Silver medal
- 2005 Olsztyn/Iława – (silver) Silver medal
- 2006 Ostróda/Iława/Olsztyn – (gold) Gold medal
- 2007 Olsztyn/Elbląg/Ostróda – (bronze) Bronze medal
- 2008 Olsztyn – (gold) Gold medal
- 2009 Łódź – (gold) Gold medal
- 2010 Bydgoszcz – (bronze) Bronze medal
- 2011 Katowice – 4th place
- 2012 Zielona Góra – (gold) Gold medal
- 2013 Płock – (gold) Gold medal
- 2014 Kraków – (silver) Silver medal
- 2015 Toruń – (gold) Gold medal
- 2016 Kraków – (bronze) Bronze medal
- 2017 Kraków – (gold) Gold medal
- 2018 Kraków – (gold) Gold medal
- 2019 Kraków – (silver) Silver medal
- 2021 Kraków – (gold) Gold medal
- 2022 Kraków – (gold) Gold medal
- 2023 Kraków – (bronze) Bronze medal
- 2024 Kraków – (gold) Gold medal
- 2025 Kraków – (bronze) Bronze medal
- 2026 Kraków – (gold) Gold medal

== Team ==
=== Current squad ===
Representing Poland at the 2026 European Championship (updated on 9 September 2026).

Head coach: Nikola Grbić
Captain: Aleksander Śliwka

No.	Name	Date of birth	Height	Weight	Spike	Block	2026–27 club
3	Jakub Popiwczak	17 April 1996	1.80 m (5 ft 11 in)	–	–	–	(Poland) Aluron CMC Warta Zawiercie
4	Marcin Komenda	19 March 1996	1.98 m (6 ft 6 in)	–	–	–	(Poland) Bogdanka LUK Lublin
7	Bartłomiej Lemański	19 March 1996	2.17 m (7 ft 1 in)	–	–	–	(Poland) Projekt Warsaw
9	Wilfredo León	31 July 1993	2.01 m (6 ft 7 in)	–	–	–	(Poland) Bogdanka LUK Lublin
11	Aleksander Śliwka	24 May 1995	1.96 m (6 ft 5 in)	–	–	–	(Poland) Projekt Warsaw
12	Artur Szalpuk	20 March 1995	2.01 m (6 ft 7 in)	–	–	–	(Poland) Asseco Resovia
16	Kamil Semeniuk	16 July 1996	1.95 m (6 ft 5 in)	–	–	–	(Italy) Sir Safety Perugia
18	Maksymilian Granieczny	7 July 2005	1.79 m (5 ft 10 in)	–	–	–	(Poland) Ślepsk Malow Suwałki
21	Tomasz Fornal	31 August 1997	2.00 m (6 ft 7 in)	–	–	–	(Poland) Aluron CMC Warta Zawiercie
30	Bartłomiej Bołądź	28 September 1994	2.04 m (6 ft 8 in)	–	–	–	(Poland) Aluron CMC Warta Zawiercie
34	Szymon Jakubiszak	13 February 1998	2.10 m (6 ft 11 in)	–	–	–	(Poland) ZAKSA Kędzierzyn-Koźle
35	Kewin Sasak	20 February 1997	2.08 m (6 ft 10 in)	–	–	–	(Poland) Bogdanka LUK Lublin
73	Jakub Nowak	11 June 2005	2.05 m (6 ft 9 in)	–	–	–	(Poland) Norwid Częstochowa
96	Jan Firlej	26 September 1996	1.88 m (6 ft 2 in)	–	–	–	(Poland) Projekt Warsaw

=== Head coaches ===
- 1948–1949 – Romuald Wirszyłło
- 1949–1952 – Zygmunt Kraus
- 1952–1953 – Wiesław Piotrowski
- 1953–1954 – Zygmunt Kraus
- 1954–1956 – Leonard Michniewski
- 1956–1958 – Jacek Busz
- 1958–1959 – Józef Śliwka
- 1959–1964 – Gwidon Grochowski
- 1964–1966 – Zygmunt Kraus
- 1966–1973 – Tadeusz Szlagor
- 1973–1976 – Hubert Wagner
- 1976–1979 – Jerzy Welcz
- 1979–1983 – Aleksander Skiba
- 1983–1986 – Hubert Wagner
- 1986–1988 – Stanisław Gościniak
- 1988–1990 – Leszek Milewski
- 1990–1992 – Edward Skorek
- 1992–1993 – Zbigniew Zarzycki
- 1993–1994 – Ryszard Kruk
- 1994–1996 – Wiktor Krebok
- 1996–1998 – Hubert Wagner
- 1998–2000 – Ireneusz Mazur
- 2000–2001 – Ryszard Bosek
- 2001–2003 – Waldemar Wspaniały
- 2003–2004 – Stanisław Gościniak
- 2005–2008 – Raúl Lozano
- 2009–2010 – Daniel Castellani
- 2011–2013 – Andrea Anastasi
- 2014–2016 – Stéphane Antiga
- 2017–2017 – Ferdinando De Giorgi
- 2018–2021 – Vital Heynen
- 2022–present – Nikola Grbić

== Gallery ==
- 2011 FIVB World League
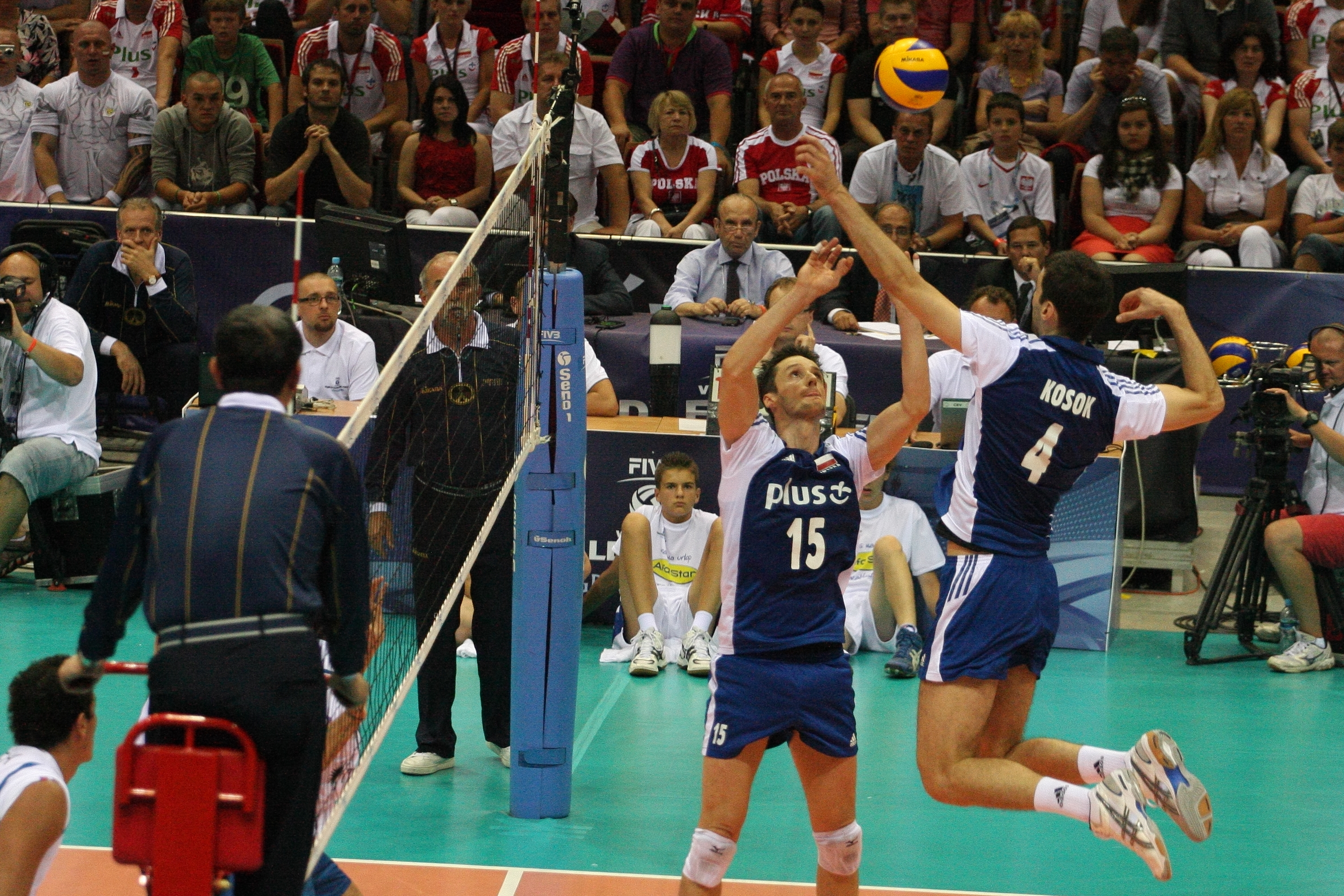

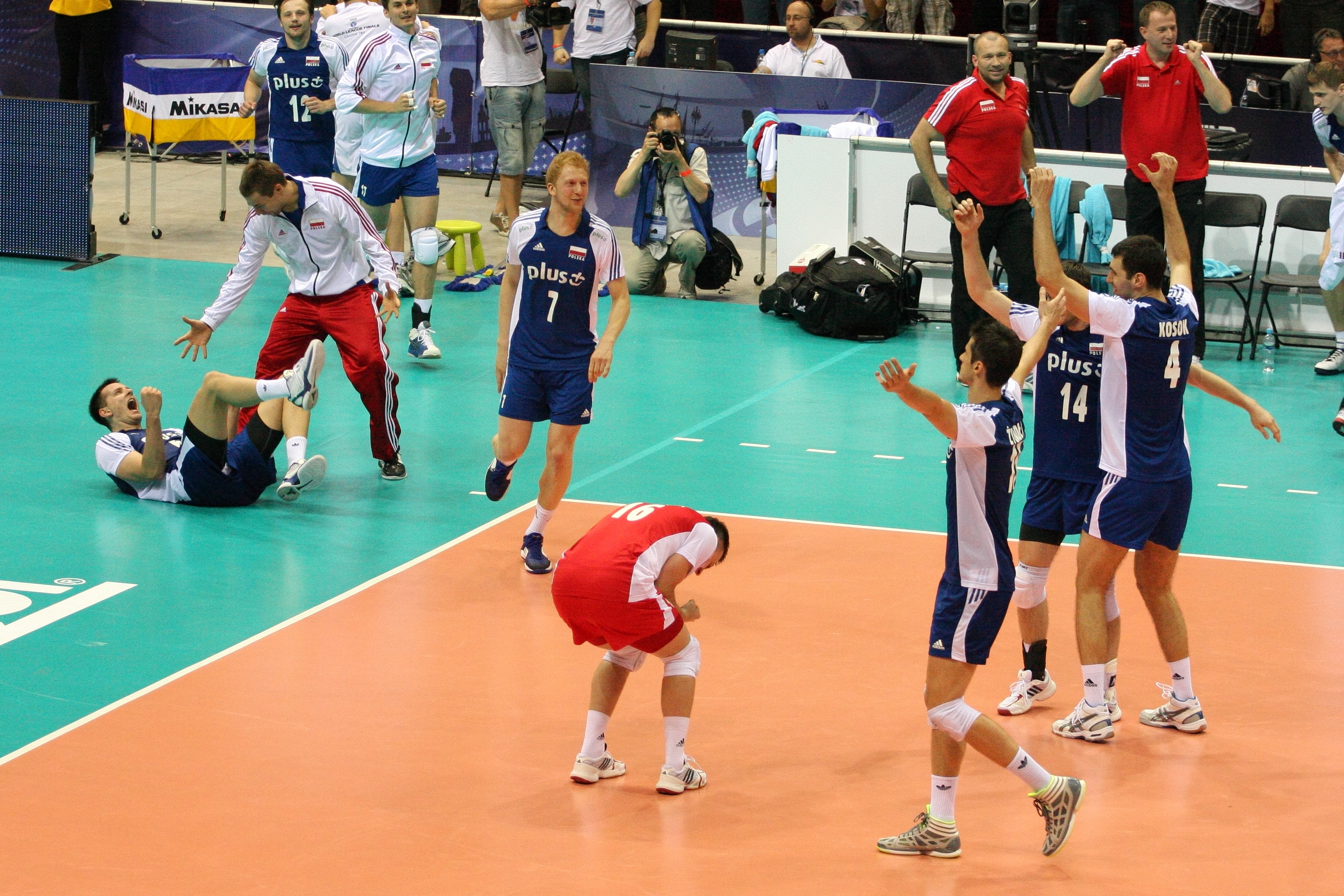

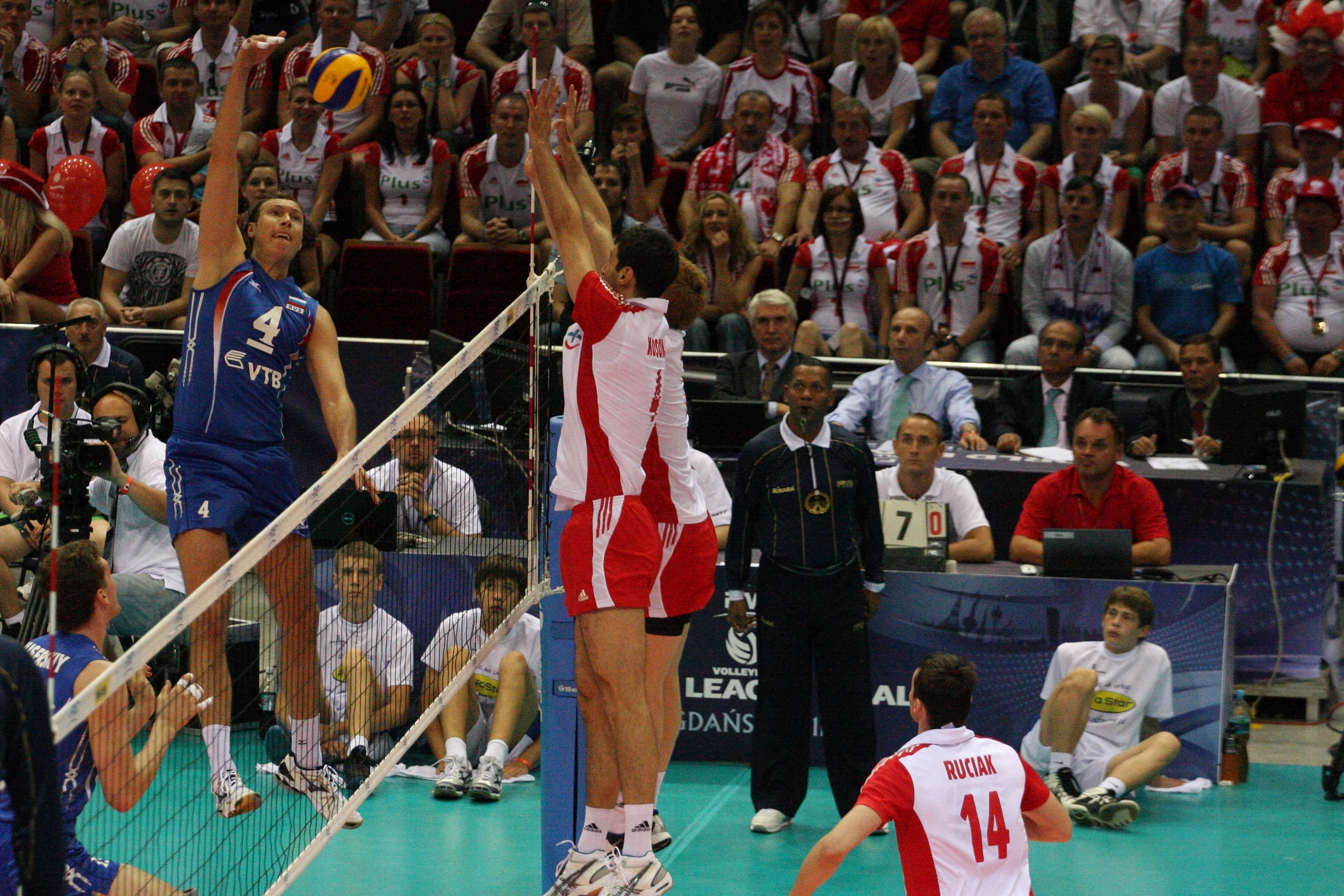

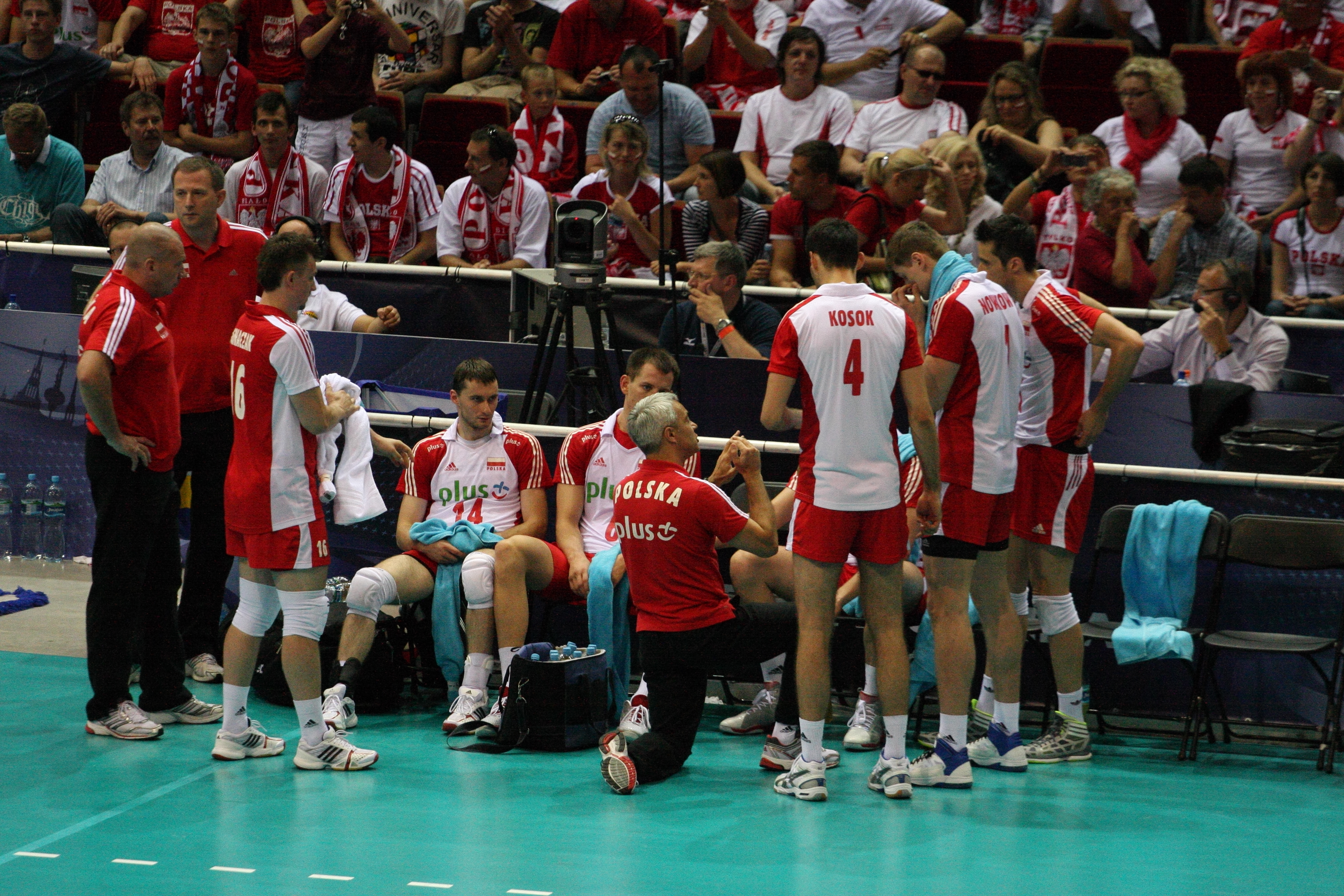

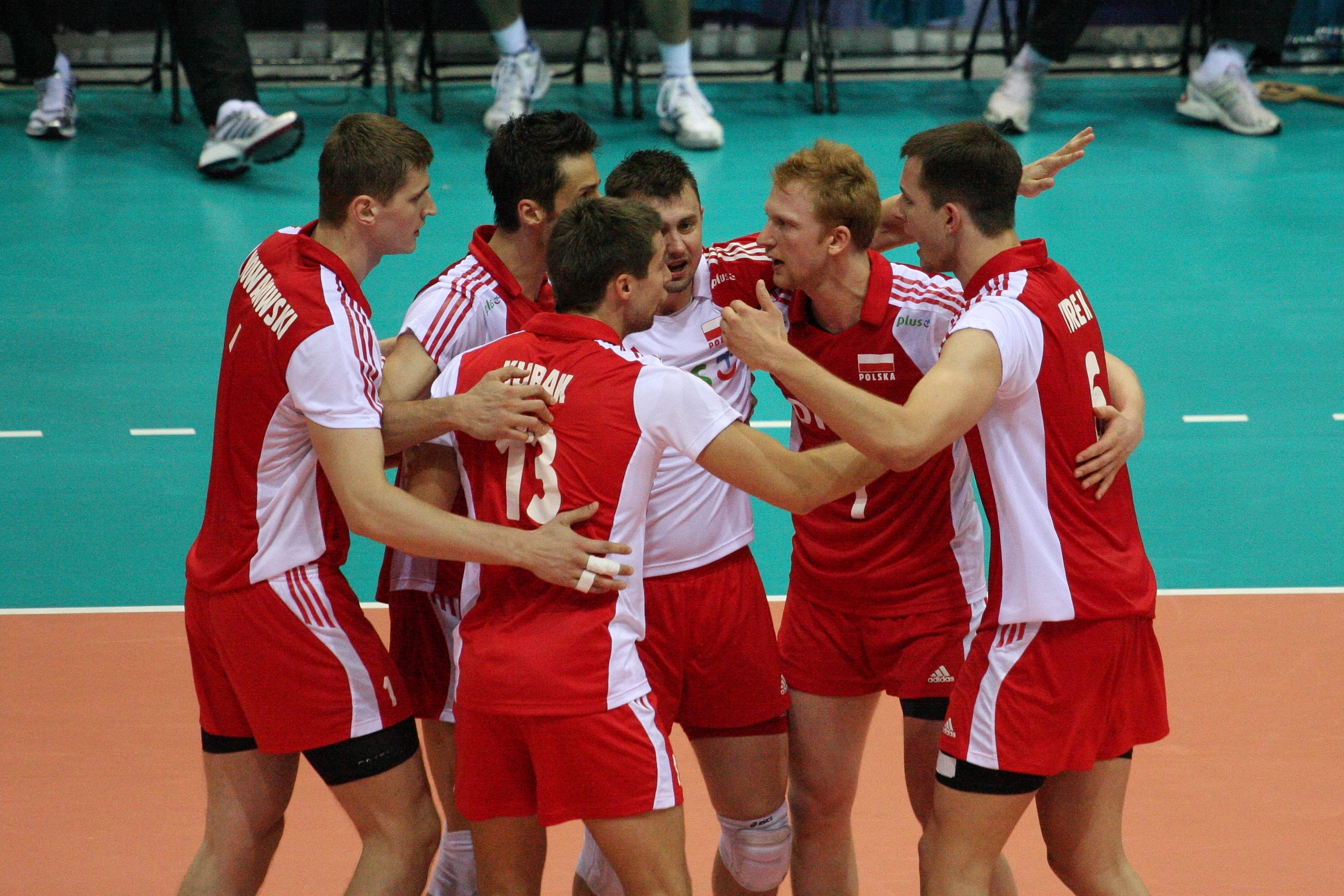

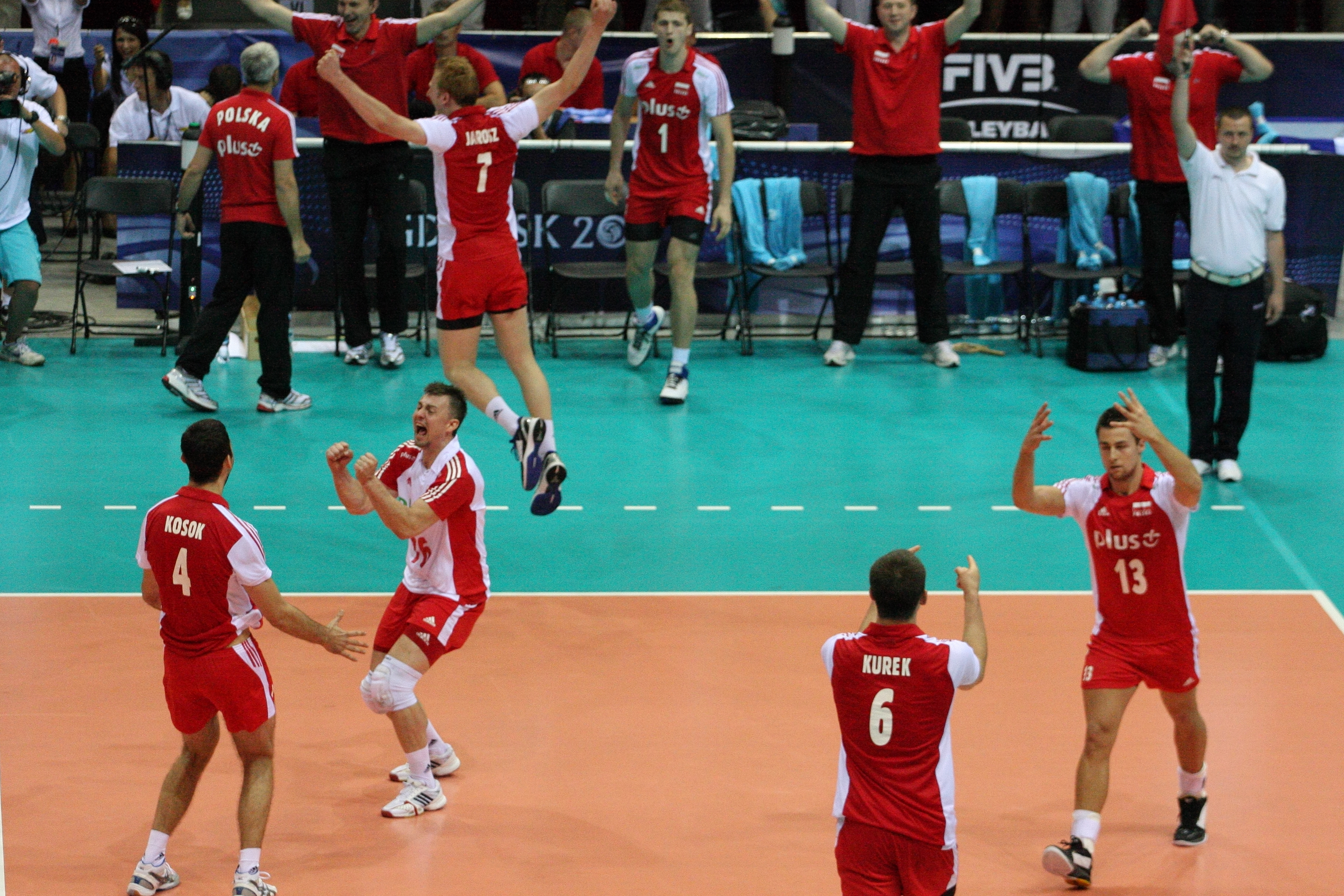

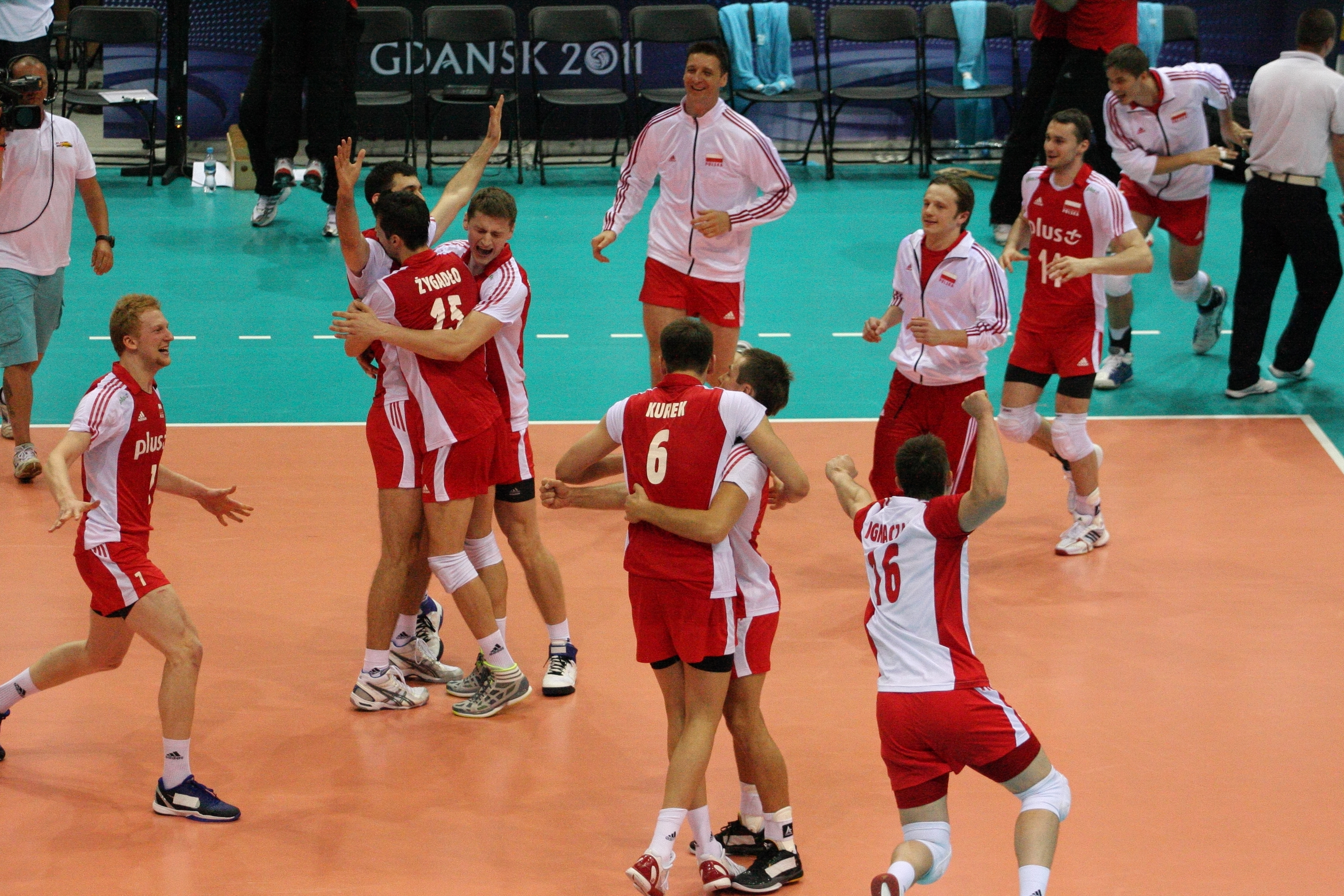

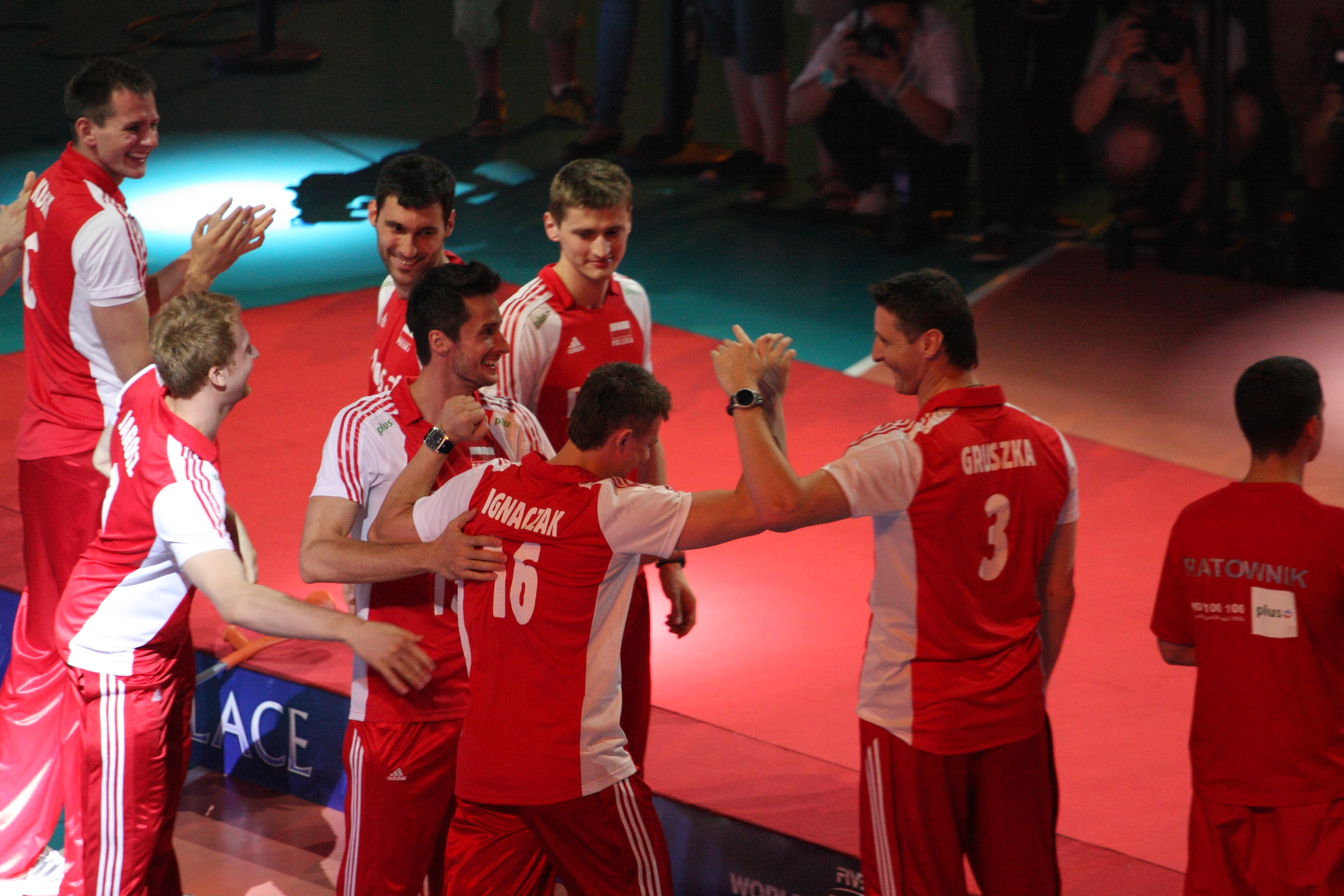

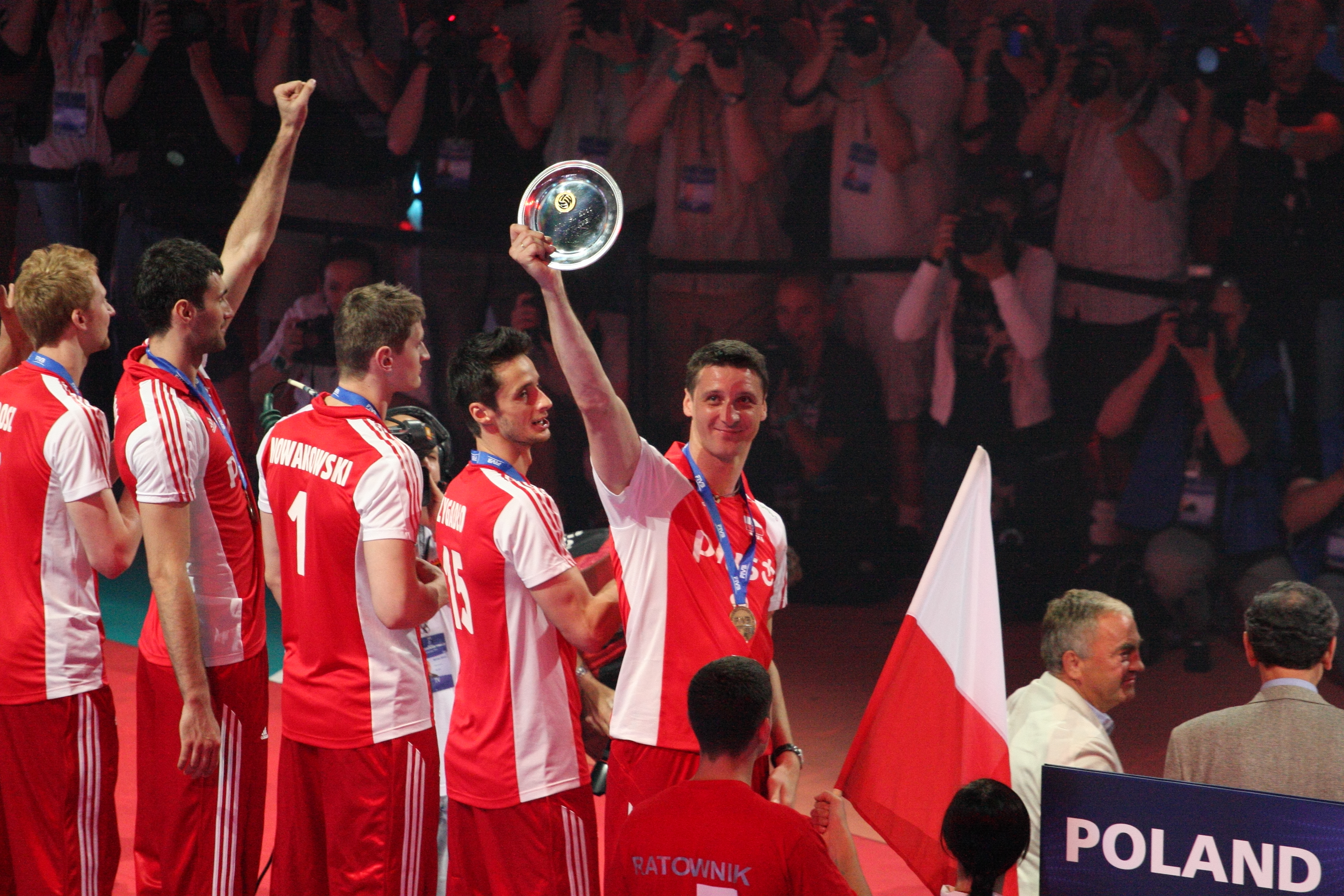

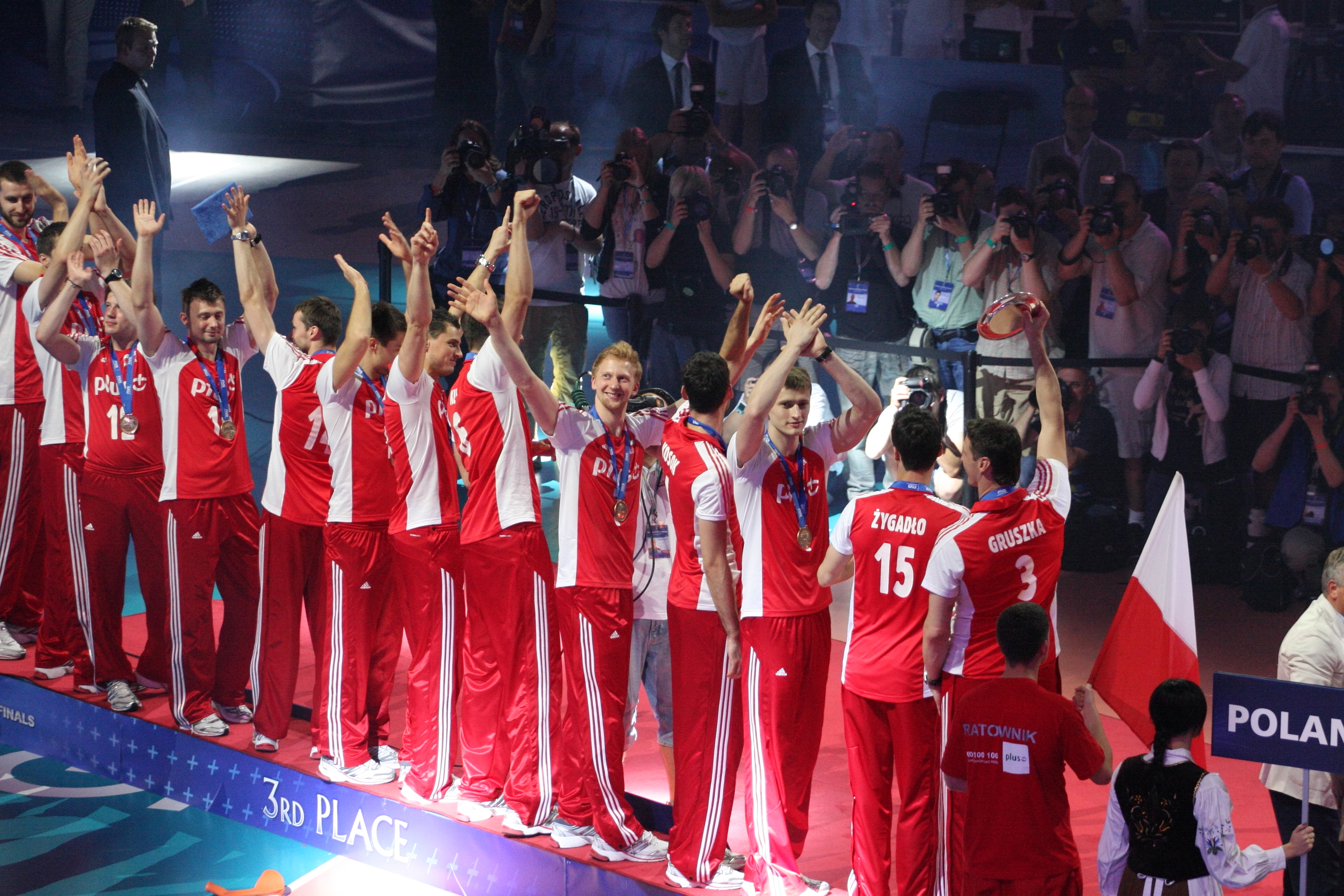
- 2012 FIVB World League
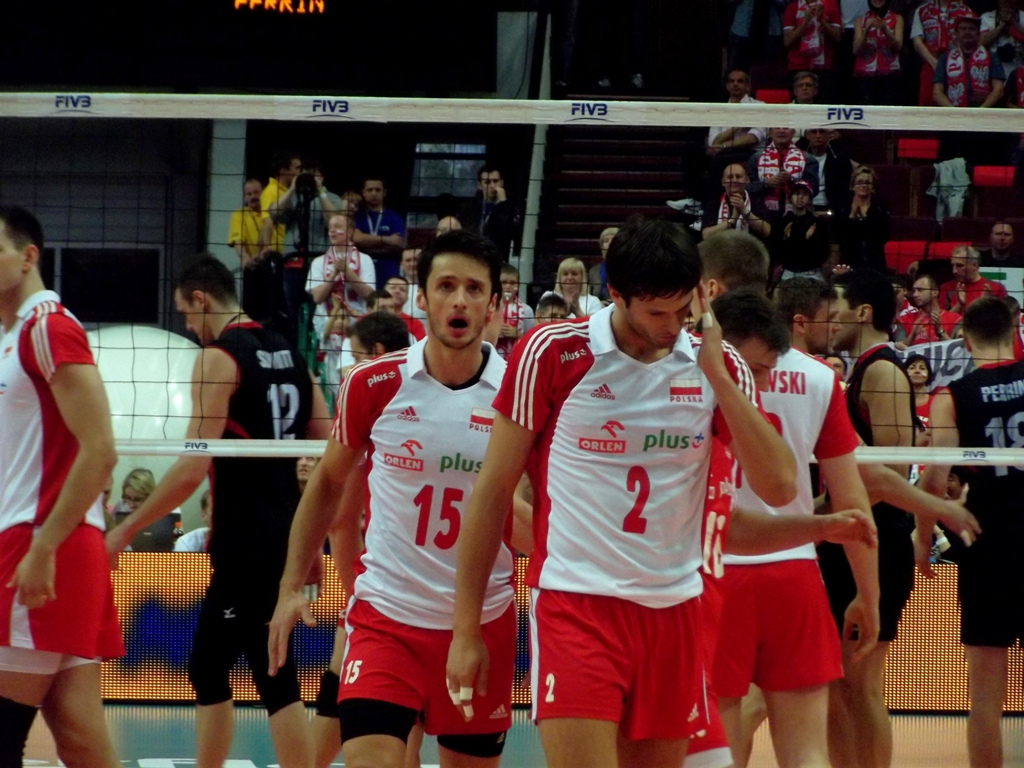

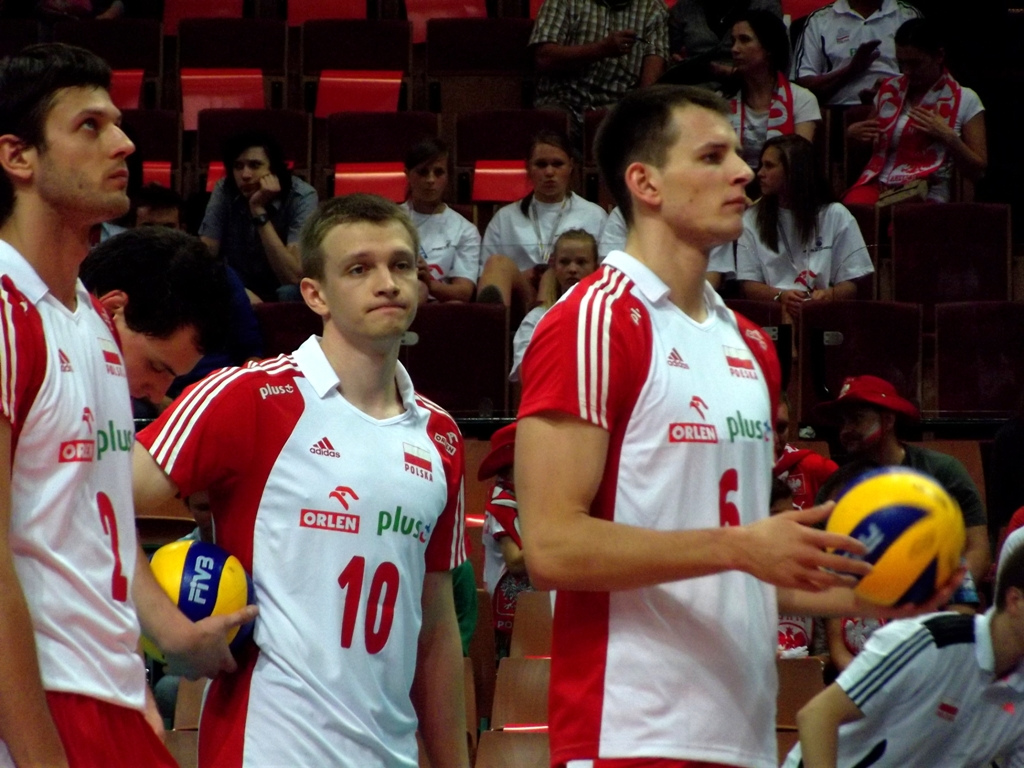

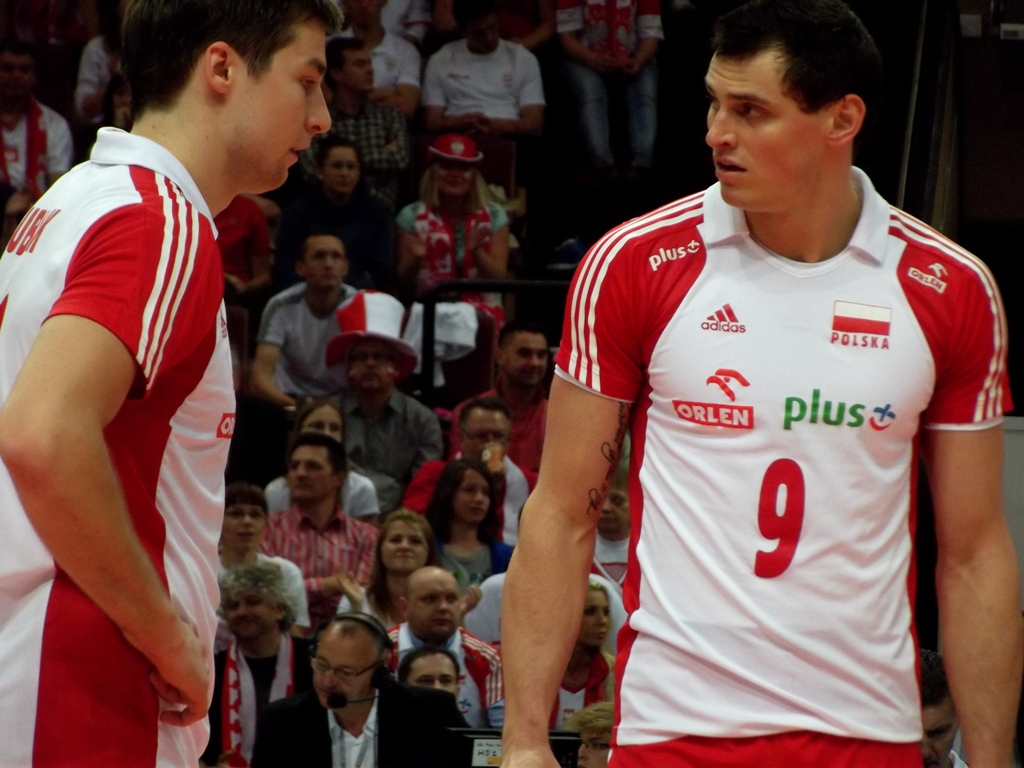

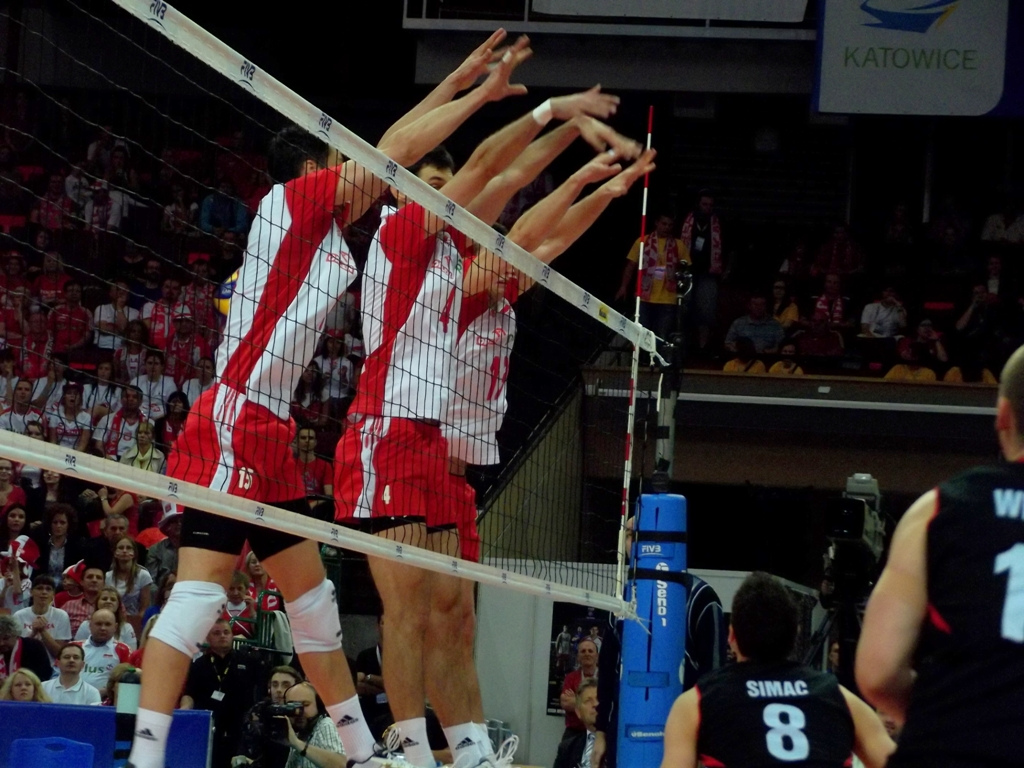

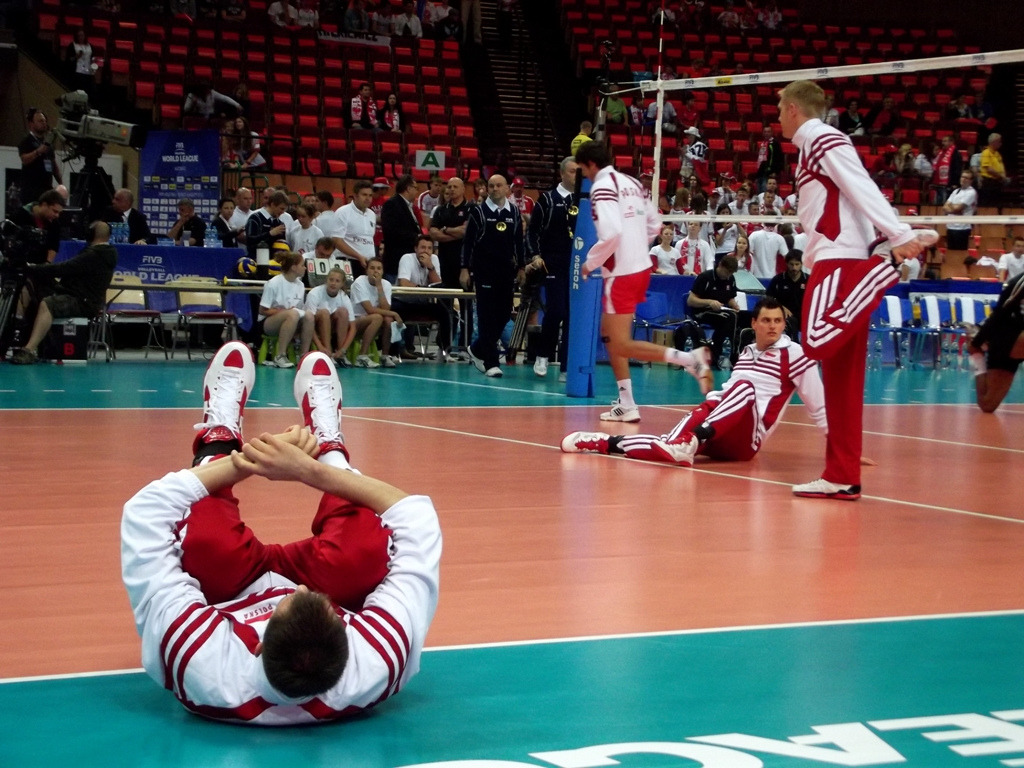

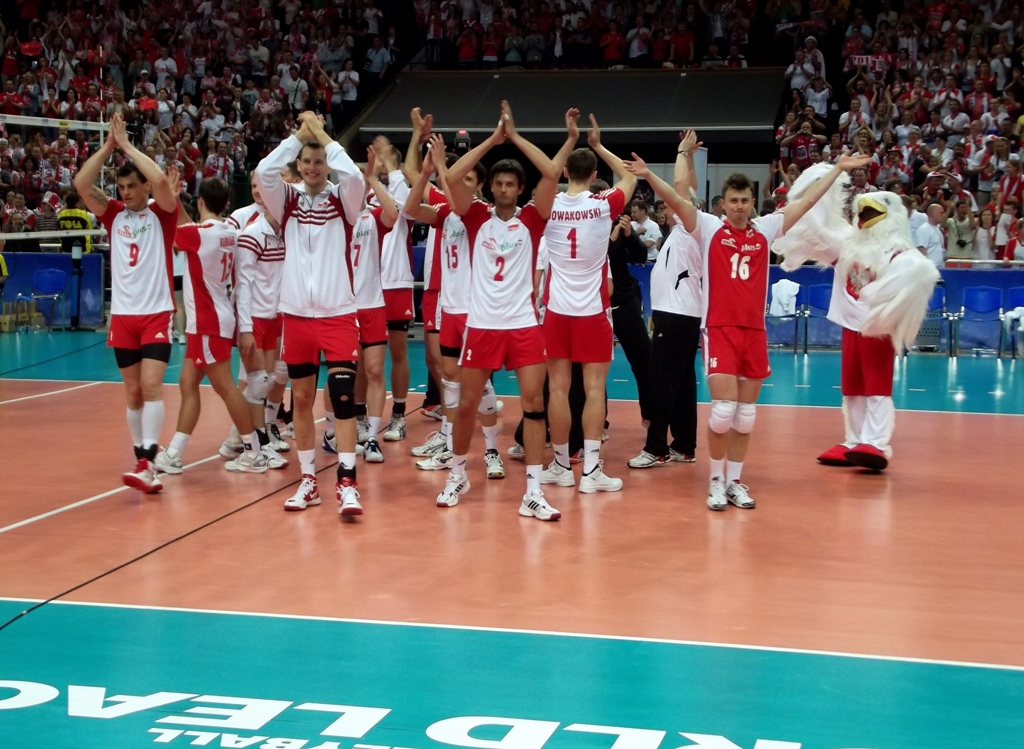
- 2013 FIVB World League
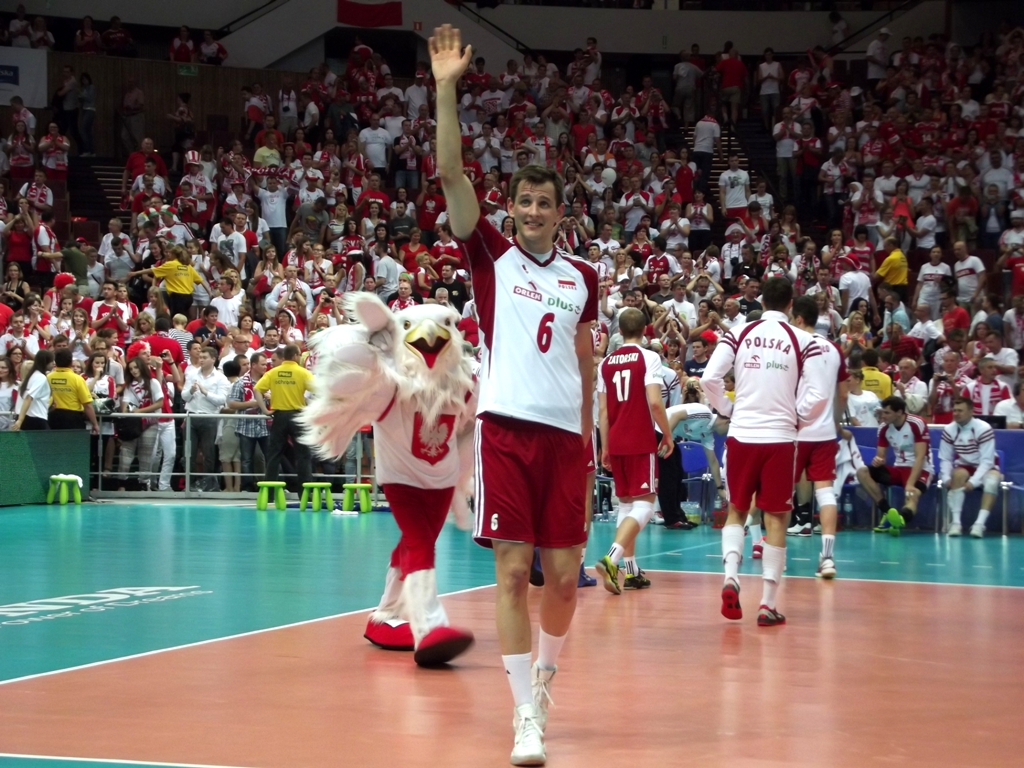

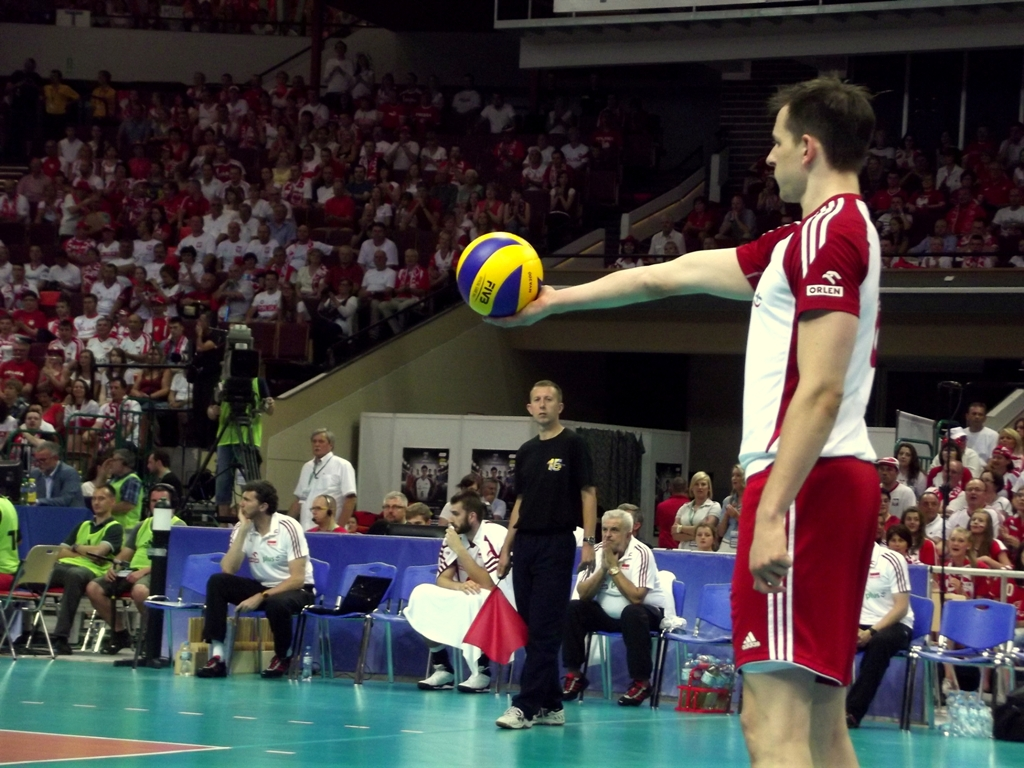

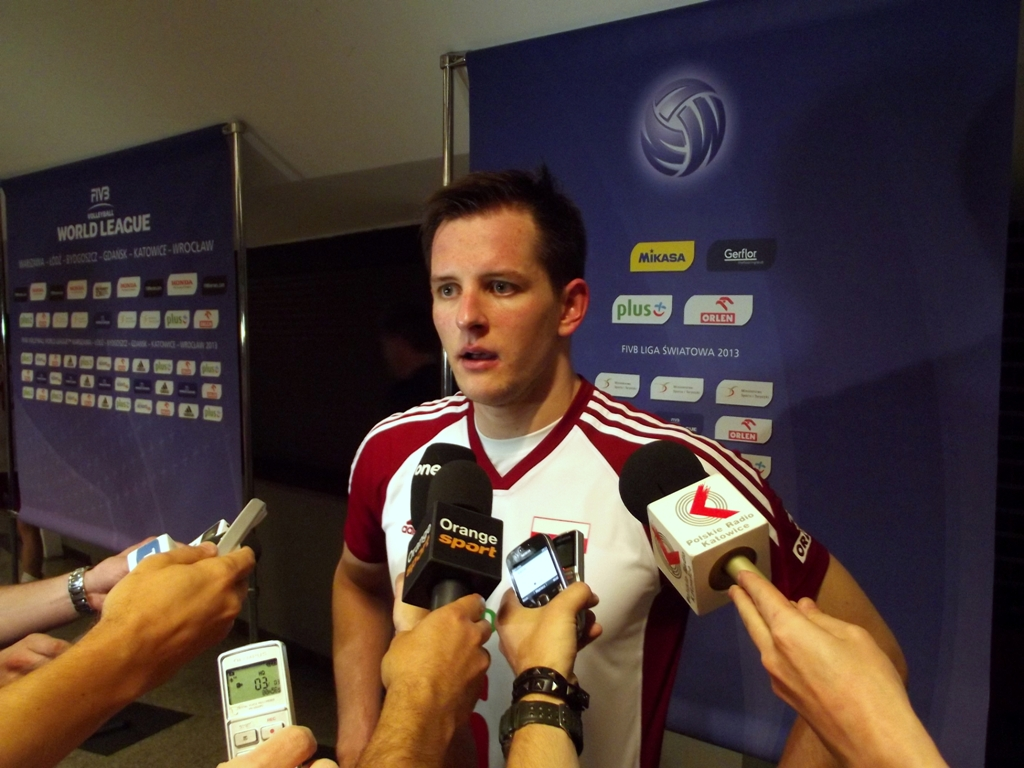

== Media ==
When Łukasz Kadziewicz was a member of the Polish national team he created the Kadziu Project. He filmed videos that showed how the Polish team was preparing for matches and their lifestyle during tournaments (for example the Olympics in Beijing, 2008). When Kadziewicz ended his career in the national team, Krzysztof Ignaczak took up his idea and he was continuing this work under the name Igłą Szyte. Ignaczak has made videos and has written a blog.

On 8 August 2014 held the official premiere of a documentary film about the Polish volleyball national team Drużyna. In the video players was talking about national team, motivation, daily life of representation. Cameras accompanied the team leading by Andrea Anastasi in 2013. The movie shows the season from the start of the preparation in Spała to the end of the 2013 CEV European Championship. The film ends with the takeover the team by the new national team coach Stephane Antiga.

== Kit providers ==
The table below shows the history of kit providers for the Poland national volleyball team.

Period	Kit provider
until 1996	Adidas
1997–1999	Nike
2000–2002	Adidas
2003–2008	Asics
2008–2024	Adidas
2025–present	4F

=== Sponsorship ===
Primary sponsors include: main sponsors like PKN Orlen and Plus, other sponsors: Adidas, Okocim Brewery, Deloitte, Kinder +Sport, Dynamic Parcel Distribution, Jurajska and SMJ sport.

== See also ==
- Individual awards for players of Polish men's national team
- Poland men's national U19 volleyball team
- Poland men's national U21 volleyball team
- Poland men's national U23 volleyball team
