= Poland men's national under-23 volleyball team =

National sports team

Poland U23
- Nickname(s): Biało-Czerwoni
- Association: Polski Związek Piłki Siatkowej
- Confederation: CEV

Uniforms
Home	Away
- www.pzps.pl (in Polish)

The Poland men's national under-23 volleyball team is the men's national under-23 volleyball team of Poland. The team is controlled by the Polski Związek Piłki Siatkowej (PZPS), which represents the country in international competitions - FIVB U23 World Championships.

== History ==
Polish national under-23 team qualified to 2017 FIVB U23 World Championship on August 1, 2016. The national team led by Wojciech Serafin, won all matches in qualification tournament. In 2017, the national under-23 team was taken by Dariusz Daszkiewicz. They won their debut match in World Championship on August 18, 2017 against Cuba (4–1).

== International competitions ==
=== U23 World Championship ===
2013 to 2015 — did not participate

- 2017 Egypt — 9th place
  Firlej, Semeniuk, Komenda (C), Halaba, Depowski, Zwiech, Lipiński, Formela, Szymura, Kania, Czunkiewicz, Mucha. Head coach: Daszkiewicz

== Team ==
Updated: 18 August 2017

Represent Poland U23 at 2017 FIVB U23 World Championship:

Head coach:	Dariusz Daszkiewicz
Assistants:	Karol Rędzioch, Adam Swaczyna, Mateusz Grabda
Coach of physical preparation:	Jakub Gniado
Physiotherapists:	Agnieszka Bronisz, Tomasz Mgłosiek
Scoutmans:	Damian Musiak, Adam Tołoczko
Manager:	Paweł Pyziak

No.	Name	Date of birth	Height	Weight	Spike	Block	2017 club
1	Jan Firlej	26 September 1996	1.87 m (6 ft 2 in)	82 kg (181 lb)	325 cm (128 in)	306 cm (120 in)	(Poland) AZS Politechnika Warszawska
3	Kamil Semeniuk	16 July 1996	1.91 m (6 ft 3 in)	82 kg (181 lb)	350 cm (140 in)	335 cm (132 in)	(Poland) ZAKSA Kędzierzyn-Koźle
4	Marcin Komenda (C)	24 May 1996	1.98 m (6 ft 6 in)	90 kg (200 lb)	335 cm (132 in)	315 cm (124 in)	(Poland) Effector Kielce
5	Paweł Halaba	14 December 1995	1.94 m (6 ft 4 in)	87 kg (192 lb)	354 cm (139 in)	330 cm (130 in)	(Poland) AZS Politechnika Warszawska
6	Dominik Depowski	27 October 1995	2.00 m (6 ft 7 in)	93 kg (205 lb)	345 cm (136 in)	320 cm (130 in)	(Poland) Espadon Szczecin
8	Jakub Zwiech	6 November 1996	2.02 m (6 ft 8 in)	95 kg (209 lb)	340 cm (130 in)	320 cm (130 in)	(Poland) Cerrad Czarni Radom
9	Bartłomiej Lipiński	16 November 1996	2.01 m (6 ft 7 in)	95 kg (209 lb)	350 cm (140 in)	330 cm (130 in)	(Poland) BBTS Bielsko-Biała
12	Konrad Formela	8 March 1995	1.94 m (6 ft 4 in)	86 kg (190 lb)	340 cm (130 in)	330 cm (130 in)	(Poland) Effector Kielce
13	Rafał Szymura	29 August 1995	1.96 m (6 ft 5 in)	93 kg (205 lb)	340 cm (130 in)	310 cm (120 in)	(Poland) AZS Częstochowa
14	Marcin Kania	14 February 1996	2.03 m (6 ft 8 in)	82 kg (181 lb)	352 cm (139 in)	325 cm (128 in)	(Poland) AKS Resovia Rzeszow (U23)
15	Mateusz Czunkiewicz	16 December 1996	1.80 m (5 ft 11 in)	82 kg (181 lb)	327 cm (129 in)	305 cm (120 in)	(Poland) Łuczniczka Bydgoszcz
16	Jarosław Mucha	25 May 1997	2.00 m (6 ft 7 in)	88 kg (194 lb)	340 cm (130 in)	315 cm (124 in)	(Poland) KS Norwid Częstochowa (U23)

== See also ==
- Poland men's national U19 volleyball team
- Poland men's national U21 volleyball team
- Poland men's national volleyball team
