= Jarosław Mucha =

Polish volleyball player (born 1997)

Personal information
- Full name: Jarosław Mucha
- Nationality: Polish
- Born: 25 May 1997 (age 29); Jasło, Poland
- Height: 2.00 m (6 ft 7 in)
- Weight: 88 kg (194 lb)
- Spike: 340 cm (130 in)
- Block: 315 cm (124 in)

Volleyball information
- Position: Middle blocker
- Current club: KS Norwid Częstochowa U23
- Number: 16

National team
2017; 2017	Poland U21; Poland U23
- Last updated: 18 August 2017

Jarosław Mucha (born 25 May 1997) is a Polish volleyball player, a member of Polish club KS Norwid Częstochowa U23, U21 World Champion 2017.

== Career ==
=== National team ===
On 2 July 2017 Poland U21, including Gil, achieved title of U21 World Champion 2017 after beating Cuba U21 in the finale (3–0). His national team won 48 matches in the row and never lost.

== Sporting achievements ==
=== National team ===
- 2017 FIVB U21 World Championship
