= Volleyball at the Junior Pan American Games =

- Frequency: Every four years
- Inaugurated: 2021
- Most recent: 2025
- Most successful team(s): Brazil

Volleyball has been a discipline of the Junior Pan American Games since the first edition in 2021 in Cali-Valle, Colombia.

== Overall medal table ==
Updated with 2025 results.

Rank	Nation	Gold	Silver	Bronze	Total
1	Brazil	4	0	0	4
2	Mexico	0	2	0	2
3	Argentina	0	1	2	3
4	Peru	0	1	0	1
5	Cuba	0	0	1	1
5	Dominican Republic	0	0	1	1
Totals (6 entries)		4	4	4	12

== Men's tournament ==
=== Summaries ===
Junior Pan American Games
Years	Hosts	Gold	Silver	Bronze
2021; Details	Cali-Valle, Colombia	Brazil	Mexico	Argentina
2025; Details	Asunción, Paraguay	Brazil	Argentina	Cuba

=== Men's medal table ===
Rank	Nation	Gold	Silver	Bronze	Total
1	Brazil	2	0	0	2
2	Argentina	0	1	1	2
3	Mexico	0	1	0	1
4	Cuba	0	0	1	1
Totals (4 entries)		2	2	2	6

== Women's tournament ==
=== Summaries ===
Junior Pan American Games
Years	Hosts	Gold	Silver	Bronze
2021; Details	Cali-Valle, Colombia	Brazil	Peru	Argentina
2025; Details	Asunción, Paraguay	Brazil	Mexico	Dominican Republic

=== Women's medal table ===
Rank	Nation	Gold	Silver	Bronze	Total
1	Brazil	2	0	0	2
2	Mexico	0	1	0	1
2	Peru	0	1	0	1
4	Argentina	0	0	1	1
4	Dominican Republic	0	0	1	1
Totals (5 entries)		2	2	2	6

== See also ==
- Volleyball at the Pan American Games
- Volleyball at the Summer Olympics
