= United States men's national under-23 volleyball team =

United States U23
- Association: USA Volleyball
- Confederation: NORCECA

Uniforms
Home	Away	Third

FIVB U23 World Championship
- Appearances: None

U23 NORCECA Pan American Cup
- Appearances: 1 (First in 2025)
- Best result: Gold : (2026)
- www.usavolleyball.org
Honours
U23 NORCECA Pan American Cup
Gold medal – first place	2026 El Salvador	Team
Silver medal – second place	2025 Guatemala	Team

The United States men's national under-23 volleyball team represents the United States in international men's volleyball competitions and friendly matches under the age 23 and it is ruled by the USA Volleyball USAV body That is an affiliate of the International Volleyball Federation FIVB and also a part of the North, Central America and Caribbean Volleyball Confederation NORCECA.

== Results ==
=== FIVB U23 World Championship ===
Champions Runners up Third place Fourth place

FIVB U23 World Championship
Year	Round	Position	Pld	W	L	SW	SL	Squad
(Brazil) 2013	Didn't Qualify							
(United Arab Emirates) 2015	Didn't Qualify							
(Egypt) 2017	Didn't Qualify							
Total	0 Title	0/3	—N/a					

=== U23 NORCECA Pan American Cup ===
Champions Runners up Third place Fourth place

U23 NORCECA Pan American Cup
Year	Round	Position	Pld	W	L	SW	SL	Squad
(Canada) 2012	Didn't participate							
(Cuba) 2014	Didn't participate							
(Mexico) 2016	Didn't participate							
(Guatemala) 2018	Didn't participate							
(Dominican Republic) 2021	Didn't participate							
(Cuba) 2023	Didn't participate							
(Suriname) 2024	Didn't participate							
(Guatemala) 2025	Final	Runners up	6	4	2	15	7	Squad
(El Salvador) 2026	Final	Champions	4	4	0	12	1	Squad
Total	1 Title	2/9	10	8	2	27	8	—N/a

== Team ==
=== Current squad ===
The following athletes representing the United States at the 2026 Men's U23 NORCECA Pan American Cup.

Head Coach: Nickie Sanlin

No.	Name	Date of birth	Height	Weight	Spike	Block	School / club
1	Kellen Larson		1.76 m (5 ft 9 in)				(United States) Long Beach State
2	Zach Chapin		1.80 m (5 ft 11 in)				(United States) Pepperdine
3	Ayden DesLauriers						(United States) Loyola University Chicago
4	Trevor Herget		1.90 m (6 ft 3 in)				(United States) BYU
5	Owen Douphner		1.98 m (6 ft 6 in)				(United States) CSUN
6	Connor Oldani		1.96 m (6 ft 5 in)				(United States) BYU
9	AJ Cottle		2.04 m (6 ft 8 in)				(United States) BYU
10	Braydon Savitski-Lynde		2.00 m (6 ft 7 in)				(United States) Ball State
12	David Decker		2.06 m (6 ft 9 in)				(United States) UCLA
13	Cameron Hoying		2.06 m (6 ft 9 in)				(United States) Ohio Valley
14	Aleksey Mikhailenko		2.02 m (6 ft 8 in)				(United States) Homestead HS
15	Ryan Louis		2.06 m (6 ft 9 in)				(United States) Ball State
16	Aidan Klein		2.08 m (6 ft 10 in)				(United States) Loyola University Chicago
17	Will Patterson		2.08 m (6 ft 10 in)				(United States) Ohio Valley
