= 2023 Men's U23 Pan-American Volleyball Cup =

Tournament details
- Host country: Cuba
- City: Havana
- Dates: 11–16 July
- Teams: 6
- Venue: 1 (in 1 host city)

Tournament statistics
- Matches played: 12
- Attendance: 2,270 (189 per match)

The 2023 Men's U23 Pan-American Volleyball Cup is the fifth edition of the Men's U23 Pan-American Volleyball Cup, the bi-annual volleyball tournament organized by the Pan-American Volleyball Union (UPV) that brings together the NORCECA and Confederación Sudamericana de Voleibol (CSV) U23 men's national teams. It was held in Havana, Cuba from 11 to 16 July 2023.

Cuba were the defending champions.

== Participating teams ==
Up to a maximum of 8 national teams could qualify for the tournament as follows: the host nation and the top 7 teams in the Pan-American Volleyball Union U23 Continental Ranking that confirme their participation. Eventually, there were 4 NORCECA teams and 2 CSV teams that confirmed their participation, making a total of 6 teams.

The following were the teams eligible to participate in the tournament (teams that confirmed their participation marked in bold and confederation ranking, if given, shown in brackets):

NORCECA (North, Central America and Caribbean Volleyball Confederation)

- **Dominican Republic** (1)
- **Cuba** (2, hosts and holders)
- **Mexico** (3)
- ~~Puerto Rico~~ (4)
- **Nicaragua** (5)
- ~~Canada~~ (no rank)
- ~~United States~~ (no rank)

CSV (South American Volleyball Confederation)

- ~~Colombia~~
- ~~Argentina~~
- ~~Brazil~~
- **Peru**
- ~~Venezuela~~
- **Chile**

=== Squads ===
Each national team had to register a squad of 12 players. Players born on 1 January 2001 and onwards were eligible to compete in the tournament.

== Competition format ==
In the Pan-American Cups the competition format depends on the number of participating teams. With 6 teams, a single round robin pool was formed. The pool standing procedure was as follows:

1. Number of matches won;
2. Match points;
  - Match won 3–0: 5 match points for the winner, 0 match points for the loser
  - Match won 3–1: 4 match points for the winner, 1 match point for the loser
  - Match won 3–2: 3 match points for the winner, 2 match points for the loser
3. Points ratio;
4. Sets ratio;
5. If the tie continues between two teams: result of the last match between the tied teams;
6. If the tie continues between three or more teams: a new classification would be made taking into consideration only the matches between involved teams.

The winners and runners-up advanced to the final, the third and fourth placed teams played the third place match and the fifth and sixth placed teams played the fifth place match.

=== Pools composition ===
The teams conformed a single pool.

Pool
Cuba
Dominican Republic
Mexico
Chile
Nicaragua
Peru

== Preliminary round ==
All match times are in CDT (UTC−4).

=== Standings ===
Pos	Team	Pld	W	L	Pts	SPW	SPL	SPR	SW	SL	SR	Qualification
1	Cuba	5	5	0	22	431	272	1.585	15	3	5.000	Final
2	Dominican Republic	5	4	1	20	403	283	1.424	13	4	3.250	Final
3	Peru	5	3	2	18	393	304	1.293	12	6	2.000	3rd place match
4	Chile	5	2	3	9	333	312	1.067	6	10	0.600	3rd place match
5	Nicaragua	5	1	4	6	310	324	0.957	4	12	0.333	5th place match
6	Mexico	5	0	5	0	0	375	0.000	0	15	0.000	5th place match

Source: NORCECA

=== Matches ===
Date	Time		Score		Set 1	Set 2	Set 3	Set 4	Set 5	Total	Report
11 July	10:00	Chile	3–1	Dominican Republic	23–25	25–21	25–17	26–24		99–87	P2 P3
11 July	12:00	Peru	2–3	Cuba	19–25	25–20	12–25	25–21	7–25	88–116	P2 P3
11 July	14:00	Mexico	0–3	Dominican Republic	0–25	0–25	0–25	forfeit	Mexico	0–75	P2 P3
12 July	10:00	Mexico	0–3	Peru	0–25	0–25	0–25	forfeit	Mexico	0–75	P2 P3
12 July	12:00	Cuba	3–0	Nicaragua	25–16	25–16	25–14			75–46	P2 P3
12 July	14:00	Dominican Republic	3–0	Chile	25–18	25–17	25–20			75–55	P2 P3
13 July	10:00	Peru	1–3	Dominican Republic	11–25	23–25	25–23	21–25		80–98	P2 P3
13 July	12:00	Chile	0–3	Cuba	17–25	21–25	20–25			58–75	P2 P3
13 July	14:00	Nicaragua	3–0	Mexico	25–0	25–0	25–0	forfeit	Mexico	75–0	P2 P3
14 July	10:00	Peru	3–0	Chile	25–12	25–14	25–20			75–46	P2 P3
14 July	12:00	Cuba	3–0	Mexico	25–0	25–0	25–0	forfeit	Mexico	75–0	P2 P3
14 July	14:00	Dominican Republic	3–0	Nicaragua	25–16	25–14	25–18			75–48	P2 P3
15 July	10:00	Nicaragua	0–3	Peru	15–25	22–25	17–25			54–75	P2 P3
15 July	12:00	Dominican Republic	1–3	Cuba	25–27	18–25	25–23	12–25		80–100	P2 P3
15 July	14:00	Chile	3–0	Mexico	25–0	25–0	25–0	forfeit	Mexico	75–0	P2 P3

== Final round ==
=== Bracket ===
5th place match
Nicaragua	3
Mexico (forfeit)	0

3rd place match
Peru	3
Chile	0

Final
Cuba	3
Dominican Republic	0

=== 5th place match ===
Date	Time		Score		Set 1	Set 2	Set 3	Set 4	Set 5	Total	Report
23 July	16:00	Nicaragua	3–0	Mexico	25–0	25–0	25–0	forfeit	Mexico	75–0	P2 P3

=== 3rd place match ===
Date	Time		Score		Set 1	Set 2	Set 3	Set 4	Set 5	Total	Report
23 July	18:00	Peru	3–0	Chile	26–24	25–11	25–22			76–57	P2 P3

=== Final ===
Date	Time		Score		Set 1	Set 2	Set 3	Set 4	Set 5	Total	Report
23 July	18:00	Cuba	3–0	Dominican Republic	35–33	25–21	25–14			85–68	P2 P3

== Final standing ==
Rank	Team
1st place, gold medalist(s)	Cuba
2nd place, silver medalist(s)	Dominican Republic
3rd place, bronze medalist(s)	Peru
4	Chile
5	Nicaragua
6	Mexico

2023 Women's U23 Pan-American Cup champions

Cuba
3rd title

Team Roster:

Adrián Chirino (c), Jonathan Mc Kentochi, Alexis Wilson, Bryan Camino, Yusniel Martí, Yumichael Lawrence (L), Alejandro González, Thiago Suárez, Ángel Pérez, José Ramón Gómez, Brayan Valle, Jakdiel Contreras

Head coach: (Cuba) Jesús Ángel Cruz
