= João Rafael Ferreira =

Brazilian volleyball player (born 1993)

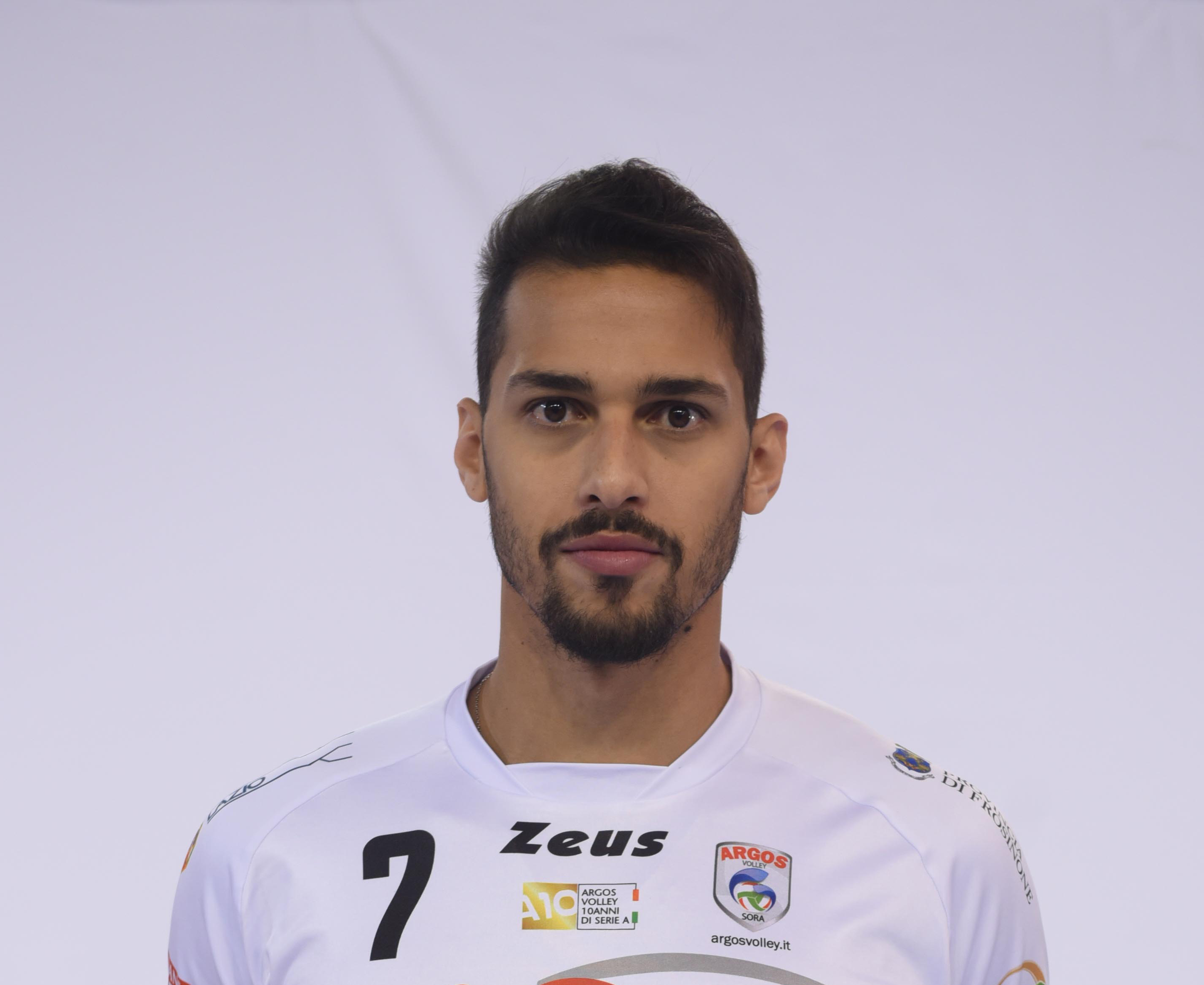
- Ferreira in 2019

Personal information
- Full name: João Rafael de Barros Ferreira
- Nationality: Brazilian
- Born: 17 March 1993 (age 33)
- Height: 1.92 m (6 ft 4 in)
- Weight: 92 kg (203 lb)
- Spike: 339 cm (133 in)
- Block: 308 cm (121 in)

Volleyball information
- Position: Outside hitter

Career
Years	Teams
2012–2013; 2013–2015; 2015–2017; 2017–2018; 2018–2020; 2019; 2020; 2020–2021; 2021; 2021–2022; 2022–2023	Vôlei Renata; Minas Tênis Clube; Pallavolo Molfetta; SESC RJ; Argos Volley; Al Arabi Doha; Tours VB; Vôlei Taubaté; Prisma Volley; Zamalek SC; Tours VB

National team
Brazil
Honours
Men's volleyball
Representing Brazil
Pan American Games
Silver medal – second place	2015 Toronto
Pan American Cup
Gold medal – first place	2015 Reno
CSV South American Championship
Gold medal – first place	2021 Brasília

João Rafael de Barros Ferreira (born 17 March 1993) is a Brazilian professional volleyball player.

== Honours ==
=== Club ===
- Domestic
  - 2020–21 Brazilian SuperCup, with Vôlei Taubaté
  - 2021–22 Egyptian Championship, with Zamalek SC
  - 2021–22 Egyptian Cup, with Zamalek SC
  - 2022–23 French Cup, with Tours VB
  - 2022–23 French Championship, with Tours VB

=== Youth national team ===
- 2011 U19 Pan American Cup
- 2012 CSV U21 South American Championship
- 2012 U23 Pan American Cup

=== Individual awards ===
- 2011: U19 Pan American Cup – Best spiker
- 2012: CSV U21 South American Championship – Most valuable player
- 2012: CSV U21 South American Championship – Best server
- 2019: Italian Championship – Best receiver
