= Argentina men's national under-23 volleyball team =

Youth volleyball team representing Argentina

Argentina
- Association: Federación del Voleibol Argentino
- Confederation: CSV

Uniforms
Home	Away

FIVB U23 World Championship
- Appearances: 3 (First in 2013)
- Best result: (gold) Champions : (2017)

South America U23 Championship
- Appearances: 2 (First in 2014)
- Best result: (silver) Runners-up : (2014, 2016).

The Argentina men's national under-23 volleyball team represents Argentina in men's under-23 volleyball events, it is controlled and managed by the Argentinian Volleyball federation that is a member of South American volleyball body Confederación Sudamericana de Voleibol (CSV) and the international volleyball body government the Fédération Internationale de Volleyball (FIVB).

== Results ==
=== FIVB U23 World Championship ===
Champions Runners up Third place Fourth place

FIVB U23 World Championship
Year	Round	Position	Pld	W	L	SW	SL	Squad
(Brazil) 2013		7th place						Squad
(United Arab Emirates) 2015		6th place						Squad
(Egypt) 2017		Champions						Squad
Total	1 Title	3/3						

=== South America U23 Championship ===
Champions Runners up Third place Fourth place

South America U23 Championship
Year	Round	Position	GP	MW	ML	SW	SL	Squad
(Brazil) 2014	Final	Runners-up						Squad
(Colombia) 2016	Final	Runners-up						Squad
Total	0 Titles	2/2						

=== U23 Pan American Cup ===
Champions Runners up Third place Fourth place

U23 Pan American Cup
Year	Round	Position	Pld	W	L	SW	SL	Squad
(Canada) 2012	Final	Runners-up						Squad
(Cuba) 2014	Didn't Enter							
(Mexico) 2016	Final	Champions						Squad
Total	1 Title	2/3						

== Team ==
=== Current squad ===
The following is the Argentine roster in the 2017 FIVB Men's U23 World Championship.

Head coach: Camilo Soto

No.	Name	Date of birth	Height	Weight	Spike	Block	2017 club
1	Matias Sanchez	20 September 1996	1.73 m (5 ft 8 in)	67 kg (148 lb)	306 cm (120 in)	290 cm (110 in)	(Argentina) Personal Bolívar
2	Brian Melgarejo	28 March 1995	1.91 m (6 ft 3 in)	93 kg (205 lb)	333 cm (131 in)	317 cm (125 in)	(Argentina) Club Ciudad de Buenos Aires
3	Jan Martinez Franchi	28 January 1998	1.90 m (6 ft 3 in)	85 kg (187 lb)	333 cm (131 in)	316 cm (124 in)	(Argentina) Club Ciudad de Buenos Aires
6	Edgar Vieira	8 February 1995	2.02 m (6 ft 8 in)	94 kg (207 lb)	342 cm (135 in)	323 cm (127 in)	(Argentina) Club Atlético Vélez Sarsfield
7	Ignacio Luengas	28 January 1996	2.00 m (6 ft 7 in)	73 kg (161 lb)	336 cm (132 in)	316 cm (124 in)	(Argentina) Club Atlético Vélez Sarsfield
8	Gaspar Bitar	19 November 1995	1.83 m (6 ft 0 in)	71 kg (157 lb)	326 cm (128 in)	312 cm (123 in)	(Italy) Club Italia
9	Santiago Danani	12 December 1995	1.76 m (5 ft 9 in)	77 kg (170 lb)	324 cm (128 in)	309 cm (122 in)	(Argentina) Club de Amigos
10	Liam Ernesto Arreche	30 December 1997	1.94 m (6 ft 4 in)	92 kg (203 lb)	339 cm (133 in)	320 cm (130 in)	(Argentina) Club de Amigos
11	Gaston Fernandez (C)	4 August 1995	2.03 m (6 ft 8 in)	101 kg (223 lb)	339 cm (133 in)	317 cm (125 in)	(Argentina) Club Ciudad de Buenos Aires
13	Agustín Loser	12 October 1997	1.93 m (6 ft 4 in)	77 kg (170 lb)	335 cm (132 in)	310 cm (120 in)	(Argentina) Club Ciudad de Buenos Aires
15	Andres Arduino	12 June 1995	1.86 m (6 ft 1 in)	83 kg (183 lb)	333 cm (131 in)	315 cm (124 in)	(Argentina) Club Atlético Vélez Sarsfield
16	German Johansen	2 September 1995	2.00 m (6 ft 7 in)	85 kg (187 lb)	351 cm (138 in)	336 cm (132 in)	(Argentina) Club de Amigos
