= Volleyball at the 2025 Junior Pan American Games – Men's tournament =

Volleyball – Men's tournament at the 2025 Junior Pan American Games
- Venue: COP Arena
- Location: Luque, Paraguay
- Dates: 17 – 22 August
- Nations: 8

Medalists
gold medal	Brazil
silver medal	Argentina
bronze medal	Cuba

The men's volleyball tournament at the 2025 Junior Pan American Games was the 2nd edition of the volleyball event for men at the Junior Pan American Games. It was held from 17 to 22 August 2025. All games were played at the COP Arena in Luque, Paraguay.

== Schedule ==
The schedule is as follows.

Legend
G	Group stage	¼	Quarter-finals	½	Semi-finals	B	Bronze medal match	F	Gold medal match

Sun 17	Mon 18	Tue 19	Wed 20	Thu 21	Fri 22	
G	G	G	¼	½	B	F

== Qualification ==
A total eight men's teams qualified to compete at the games in each tournament. The host nation (Paraguay) qualified automatically, along with seven other teams.

Qualification	Berths	Men's teams
Host country	1	Paraguay
NORCECA Ranking	4	Cuba; Dominican Republic; Guatemala; Mexico
CSV Ranking	4	Argentina; Brazil; Colombia

== Results ==
All times are in Paraguay Time (UTC−3).

=== Preliminary round ===
==== Group A ====
Pos	Team	Pld	W	L	Pts	SPW	SPL	SPR	SW	SL	SR
1	Mexico	3	3	0	9	244	194	1.258	9	1	9.000
2	Colombia	3	2	1	4	311	311	1.000	7	7	1.000
3	Guatemala	3	1	2	4	252	266	0.947	5	7	0.714
4	Paraguay	3	0	3	1	253	289	0.875	3	9	0.333

Source: Asunción 2025

17 August 2025; 11:00	Mexico	3–1	Colombia	COP Arena, Luque
17 August 2025; 11:00	(18–25, 25–18, 25–23, 26–24); Report			COP Arena, Luque

17 August 2025; 20:30	Paraguay	1–3	Guatemala	COP Arena, Luque
17 August 2025; 20:30	(24–26, 20–25, 25–20, 19–25); Report			COP Arena, Luque

18 August 2025; 14:00	Mexico	3–0	Guatemala	COP Arena, Luque
18 August 2025; 14:00	(25–11, 25–17, 25–23); Report			COP Arena, Luque

18 August 2025; 20:30	Paraguay	2–3	Colombia	COP Arena, Luque
18 August 2025; 20:30	(32–30, 20–25, 19–25, 25–20, 16–18); Report			COP Arena, Luque

19 August 2025; 14:00	Guatemala	2–3	Colombia	COP Arena, Luque
19 August 2025; 14:00	(23–25, 25–21, 19–25, 25–17, 13–15); Report			COP Arena, Luque

19 August 2025; 20:30	Mexico	3–0	Paraguay	COP Arena, Luque
19 August 2025; 20:30	(25–19, 25–17, 25–17); Report			COP Arena, Luque

==== Group B ====
Pos	Team	Pld	W	L	Pts	SPW	SPL	SPR	SW	SL	SR
1	Brazil	3	3	0	13	258	218	1.183	9	2	4.500
2	Argentina	3	2	1	9	307	285	1.077	8	6	1.333
3	Cuba	3	1	2	7	241	250	0.964	5	6	0.833
4	Dominican Republic	3	0	3	0	192	245	0.784	1	9	0.111

Source: Asunción 2025

17 August 2025; 14:00	Cuba	2–3	Argentina	COP Arena, Luque
17 August 2025; 14:00	(21–25, 24–26, 25–21, 25–23, 14–16); Report			COP Arena, Luque

17 August 2025; 17:30	Brazil	3–0	Dominican Republic	COP Arena, Luque
17 August 2025; 17:30	(25–20, 25–17, 25–23); Report			COP Arena, Luque

18 August 2025; 11:00	Cuba	3–0	Dominican Republic	COP Arena, Luque
18 August 2025; 11:00	(25–23, 25–18, 25–23); Report			COP Arena, Luque

18 August 2025; 17:30	Brazil	3–2	Argentina	COP Arena, Luque
18 August 2025; 17:30	(27–25, 19–25, 25–14, 22–25, 15–12); Report			COP Arena, Luque

19 August 2025; 11:00	Argentina	3–1	Dominican Republic	COP Arena, Luque
19 August 2025; 11:00	(25–12, 20–25, 25–12, 25–19); Report			COP Arena, Luque

19 August 2025; 17:30	Brazil	3–0	Cuba	COP Arena, Luque
19 August 2025; 17:30	(25–18, 25–19, 25–20); Report			COP Arena, Luque

== Elimination round ==
=== Championship bracket ===
Quarterfinals
Colombia	0
Cuba	3
Argentina	3
Guatemala	0

Semifinals
Brazil	3
Cuba	2
Mexico	0
Argentina	3

Final
Brazil	3
Argentina	2
Third place
Cuba	3
Mexico	1

=== Quarterfinals ===
20 August 2025; 16:00	Argentina	3–0	Guatemala	COP Arena, Luque
20 August 2025; 16:00	(25–22, 25–16, 25–15); Report			COP Arena, Luque

20 August 2025; 19:00	Colombia	0–3	Cuba	COP Arena, Luque
20 August 2025; 19:00	(13–25, 21–25, 22–25); Report			COP Arena, Luque

==== 5–8th place semifinals ====
21 August 2025; 11:00	Dominican Republic	3–0	Guatemala	COP Arena, Luque
21 August 2025; 11:00	(25–20, 25–18, 26–24); Report			COP Arena, Luque

21 August 2025; 14:00	Paraguay	0–3	Colombia	COP Arena, Luque
21 August 2025; 14:00	(23–25, 18–25, 23–25); Report			COP Arena, Luque

=== Semifinals ===
21 August 2025; 17:30	Brazil	3–2	Cuba	COP Arena, Luque
21 August 2025; 17:30	(14–25, 25–17, 26–24, 23–25, 15–11); Report			COP Arena, Luque

21 August 2025; 20:30	Mexico	0–3	Argentina	COP Arena, Luque
21 August 2025; 20:30	(21–25, 19–25, 23–25); Report			COP Arena, Luque

=== Seventh place match ===
22 August 2025; 09:00	Guatemala	3–2	Paraguay	COP Arena, Luque
22 August 2025; 09:00	(18–25, 25–22, 22–25, 26–24, 15–13); Report			COP Arena, Luque

=== Fifth place match ===
22 August 2025; 11:00	Dominican Republic	3–2	Colombia	COP Arena, Luque
22 August 2025; 11:00	(25–20, 25–19, 21–25, 19–25, 15–10); Report			COP Arena, Luque

=== Bronze medal match ===
22 August 2025; 13:00	Cuba	3–1	Mexico	COP Arena, Luque
22 August 2025; 13:00	(22–25, 25–13, 25–18, 25–23); Report			COP Arena, Luque

=== Gold medal match ===
22 August 2025; 15:00	Brazil	3–2	Argentina	COP Arena, Luque
22 August 2025; 15:00	(22–25, 25–15, 22–25, 27–25, 15–3); Report			COP Arena, Luque

== Final standings ==
Rank	Team
1st place, gold medalist(s)	Brazil
2nd place, silver medalist(s)	Argentina
3rd place, bronze medalist(s)	Cuba
4	Mexico
5	Dominican Republic
6	Colombia
7	Guatemala
8	Paraguay
