= Under-23 sport =

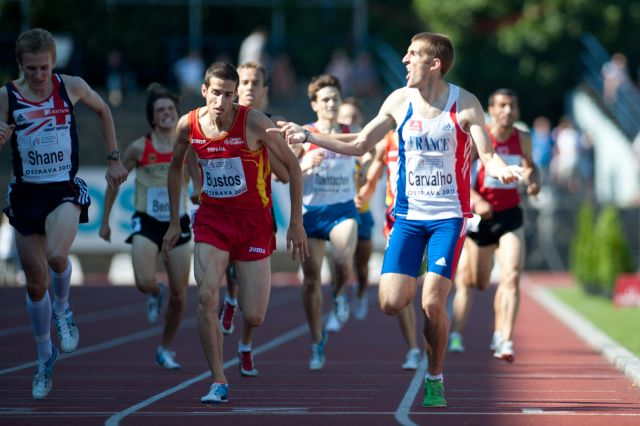
Runners at the 2011 European Athletics U23 Championships

Under-23 sport is a competitive age category grouping within sports for athletes under the age of twenty-three. An extension of age categories found in youth sports, the under-23 category is for adults who are still in a developmental stage within their chosen discipline. The intention of the grouping is to allow such adults to improve their skills against opponents of a similar standard, as opposed to elite level of competition found in open senior level competitions, where they may not receive competitive opportunities or may find their development hindered by significant ability differences.

The under-23 category roughly corresponds with the age of athletes found competing in college athletics, although in the latter grouping there is a required academic element for student-athletes and typically no upper age limit (in the case of adult learners).

The age group somewhat aligns with social definitions used outside of sport, such as the United Nations' definition of youth as "persons between the ages of 15 and 24 years".

== International competitions ==
- Under-23 athletics
  - NACAC Under-23 Championships in Athletics
  - South American Under-23 Championships in Athletics
  - European Athletics U23 Championships
  - European Cross Country Championships (race)
- Cycling
  - UCI Road World Championships – Men's under-23 road race
  - UCI Road World Championships – Men's under-23 time trial
  - UEC European Track Championships (under-23 & junior)
  - African Continental Cycling Championships (section)
  - Oceanian Cycling Championships (section)
  - Liège–Bastogne–Liège U23
  - Peace Race U23
  - Thüringen Rundfahrt der U23
  - Tour de l'Avenir (since 2007)
- Football
  - Olympic Games
  - AFC U-23 Championship
  - AFF U-23 Youth Championship
  - Africa U-23 Cup of Nations
  - GCC U-23 Championship
- Volleyball
  - FIVB Volleyball Women's U23 World Championship
  - FIVB Volleyball Men's U23 World Championship
  - Men's Asian U23 Volleyball Championship
  - Women's Asian U23 Volleyball Championship
  - Men's U23 African Volleyball Championship
  - Women's U23 African Volleyball Championship
  - Men's U23 Pan-American Volleyball Cup
  - Women's U23 Pan-American Volleyball Cup
  - Men's U23 South American Volleyball Championship
  - Women's U22 South American Volleyball Championship
- Other sports
  - Bandy World Championship Y-23
  - European U23 Judo Championships
  - European U23 Wrestling Championships
  - IWAS Under 23 World Games
  - U-23 Baseball World Cup
  - World Rowing U23 Championships

== See also ==
- Under-23 athletics
