= Men's U23 Pan-American Volleyball Cup =

The Men's U23 Pan-American Volleyball Cup is a bi-annual Continental Cup organized by NORCECA for under-23 teams from South, North and Central America, and the Caribbean.

== Results ==
U23 Pan-American Cup
Year	Host	Champion	Runner-up	3rd place	4th place
2012; Details	Vancouver, Canada	Brazil	Argentina	Dominican Republic	Canada
2014; Details	Havana, Cuba	Cuba	Mexico	Dominican Republic	Guatemala
2016; Details	Guanajuato, Mexico	Argentina	Cuba	Chile	Colombia
2018; Details	Guatemala City, Guatemala	Cuba	Mexico	Guatemala	Nicaragua
2021; Details	Santo Domingo, Dominican Republic	Mexico	Puerto Rico	Dominican Republic	Guatemala
2023; Details	Havana, Cuba	Cuba	Dominican Republic	Peru	Chile
2024; Details	Paramaribo, Suriname	Mexico	Peru	Cuba	Guatemala
2025; Details	Guatemala City, Guatemala	Dominican Republic	United States	Venezuela	Mexico
2026; Details	San Salvador, El Salvador	United States	Costa Rica	Mexico	Guatemala

== Medal table ==
Rank	Nation	Gold	Silver	Bronze	Total
1	Cuba	3	1	1	5
2	Mexico	2	2	1	5
3	Dominican Republic	1	1	3	5
4	Argentina	1	1	0	2
4	United States	1	1	0	2
6	Brazil	1	0	0	1
7	Peru	0	1	1	2
8	Costa Rica	0	1	0	1
8	Puerto Rico	0	1	0	1
10	Chile	0	0	1	1
10	Guatemala	0	0	1	1
10	Venezuela	0	0	1	1
Totals (12 entries)		9	9	9	27

== Participating nations ==
Nation	(Canada) 2012	(Cuba) 2014	(Mexico) 2016	(Guatemala) 2018	(Dominican Republic) 2021	(Cuba) 2023	(Suriname) 2024	(Guatemala) 2025	(El Salvador) 2026	Years
Argentina	2nd	–	1st	–	–	–	–	–	–	2
Belize	–	–	–	–	–	–	–	7th	–	1
Brazil	1st	–	–	–	–	–	–	–	–	1
Canada	4th	–	–	–	–	–	–	–	–	1
Chile	–	–	3rd	–	–	4th	–	–	–	2
Colombia	–	–	4th	–	–	–	–	–	–	1
Costa Rica	–	–	–	–	–	–	6th	6th	2nd	3
Cuba	–	1st	2nd	1st	7th	1st	3rd	–	–	6
Dominican Republic	3rd	3rd	6th	–	3rd	2nd	5th	1st	5th	8
El Salvador	–	6th	–	–	–	–	–	–	6th	2
Grenada	–	–	–	–	–	–	–	–	9th	1
Guatemala	–	4th	7th	3rd	4th	–	4th	5th	4th	7
Mexico	5th	2nd	5th	2nd	1st	WD	1st	4th	3rd	8
Nicaragua	–	–	–	4th	–	5th	–	–	7th	3
Panama	–	–	–	5th	–	–	–	–	–	1
Peru	–	–	–	–	5th	3rd	2nd	–	–	3
Puerto Rico	–	–	–	–	2nd	–	–	–	–	1
Saint Lucia	–	–	9th	–	–	–	–	–	–	1
Saint Vincent and the Grenadines	–	–	–	–	–	–	8th	–	–	1
Suriname	–	–	–	–	6th	–	7th	8th	–	3
Trinidad and Tobago	–	5th	8th	–	–	–	–	–	8th	2
United States	–	–	–	–	–	–	–	2nd	1st	2
Venezuela	–	–	–	–	–	–	–	3rd	–	1
Total	5	6	9	5	7	5	8	8	9	

== Most valuable player by edition ==
- 2012 – (Brazil) Rogério Carvalho
- 2014 – (Cuba) Osniel Rendón
- 2016 – (Argentina) Germán Johansen
- 2018 – (Cuba) Roamy Alonso
- 2021 – (Mexico) Josué López
- 2023 – (Cuba) Alejandro Miguel González
- 2024 – (Mexico) Isaías Aguirre
- 2025 – (Dominican Republic) Luke Harrison
- 2026 – (United States) David Decker

== See also ==
- Men's Pan-American Volleyball Cup
- Men's Junior Pan-American Volleyball Cup
- Boys' Youth Pan-American Volleyball Cup
