= Alan Souza =

Brazilian volleyball player (born 1994)

Personal information
- Full name: Alan Ferreira de Souza
- Born: 21 March 1994 (age 32); São João de Meriti, Brazil
- Height: 2.02 m (6 ft 8 in)
- Weight: 98 kg (216 lb)
- Spike: 367 cm (144 in)
- Block: 343 cm (135 in)

Volleyball information
- Position: Opposite
- Current club: Skra Bełchatów
- Number: 1

Career
Years	Teams
2012–2013; 2013–2017; 2017–2020; 2020–2021; 2021; 2022–2023; 2023–2024; 2024–2025; 2025–	Olympico Club; Sada Cruzeiro; SESI São Paulo; Sada Cruzeiro; Kuzbass Kemerovo; Apan Vôlei/Blumenau; AZS Olsztyn; Toray Arrows; Skra Bełchatów

National team
2015–	Brazil
Honours
Men's volleyball
Representing Brazil
FIVB World Cup
Gold medal – first place	2019 Japan
FIVB Nations League
Gold medal – first place	2021 Rimini
Bronze medal – third place	2025 Ningbo
Pan American Cup
Gold medal – first place	2015 Reno
Silver medal – second place	2018 Córdoba
CSV South American Championship
Gold medal – first place	2019 Chile
Gold medal – first place	2021 Brasília
Silver medal – second place	2023 Recife

Alan Ferreira de Souza (born 21 March 1994) is a Brazilian professional volleyball player who plays as an opposite spiker for Skra Bełchatów and the Brazil national team.

He competed for Brazil at the 2020 Summer Olympics and the 2024 Summer Olympics.

== Honours ==
=== Club ===
- FIVB Club World Championship
  - Betim 2015 – with Sada Cruzeiro
- CSV South American Club Championship
  - Taubate 2016 – with Sada Cruzeiro
  - Montes Claros 2017 – with Sada Cruzeiro
- Domestic
  - 2015–16 Brazilian SuperCup, with Sada Cruzeiro
  - 2015–16 Brazilian Cup, with Sada Cruzeiro
  - 2015–16 Brazilian Championship, with Sada Cruzeiro
  - 2016–17 Brazilian SuperCup, with Sada Cruzeiro
  - 2016–17 Brazilian Championship, with Sada Cruzeiro
  - 2018–19 Brazilian SuperCup, with SESI São Paulo
  - 2020–21 Brazilian Cup, with Sada Cruzeiro

=== Youth national team ===
- 2011 U19 Pan American Cup
- 2012 U23 Pan American Cup
- 2012 CSV U21 South American Championship
- 2013 FIVB U21 World Championship
- 2013 FIVB U23 World Championship
- 2014 CSV U23 South American Championship

=== Individual awards ===
- 2011: U19 Pan American Cup – Best blocker
- 2013: FIVB U21 World Championship – Best opposite spiker
- 2015: Pan American Cup – Most valuable player
- 2018: Pan American Cup – Best opposite
- 2018: Pan American Cup – Best scorer
- 2019: Brazilian Championship – Best opposite
- 2019: CSV South American Championship – Most valuable player
- 2019: FIVB World Cup – Most valuable player
- 2023: CSV South American Championship – Best opposite spiker

Awards
Preceded by (United States) Matt Anderson	Most Valuable Player of FIVB World Cup; 2019	Succeeded by Incumbent
