= Thiago Veloso =

Brazilian volleyball player (born 1993)

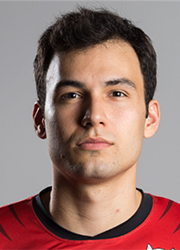

Personal information
- Full name: Thiago Pontes Veloso
- Nickname: Thiaguinho
- Born: 15 August 1993 (age 33) João Pessoa, Brazil
- Height: 1.85 m (6 ft 1 in)
- Weight: 80 kg (176 lb)
- Spike: 310 cm (122 in)

Volleyball information
- Position: Setter
- Current club: Montpellier Volley
- Number: 7

Career
- Years: Team
- 2009–2011 2011–2016 2016–2017 2017–2019 2019–2020 2020–2021 2021–2021 2022–: EC Pinheiros; SESI São Paulo; Exprivia Molfetta; SESC RJ; Rennes Volley 35; MKS Będzin; Spacer's de Toulouse; Montpellier Volley

National team
- Years: Team
- 2015–: Brazil
Honours
Men's volleyball
Representing Brazil
Pan American Games
| Gold medal – first place | 2023 Santiago |
| Silver medal – second place | 2015 Toronto |
| Bronze medal – third place | 2019 Lima |
Pan American Cup
| Gold medal – first place | 2015 Reno |
| Silver medal – second place | 2018 Córdoba |

Thiago Pontes Veloso (born 15 August 1993) is a Brazilian professional volleyball player. He competed for Brazil at the 2013 U21 World Championship and the 2015 U23 World Championship. At the professional club level, he plays for Montpellier Volley.

== Honours ==
=== Youth national team ===
- 2010 CSV U19 South American Championship
- 2011 U19 Pan American Cup
- 2012 U23 Pan American Cup
- 2012 CSV U21 South American Championship
- 2013 FIVB U21 World Championship
- 2013 FIVB U23 World Championship
- 2014 CSV U23 South American Championship

=== Individual awards ===
- 2011: U19 Pan American Cup – Best Setter
- 2012: CSV U21 South American Championship – Best Setter
- 2014: CSV U23 South American Championship – Best Setter
