= 2025 Men's U23 NORCECA Pan American Cup =

Tournament details
- Host country: Guatemala
- Dates: 29 July–3 August 2025
- Teams: 8
- Venue: 1 (in Guatemala City host cities)

Final positions
- Champions: Dominican Republic (1st title)
- Runners-up: United States
- Third place: Venezuela

Tournament awards
- MVP: Luke Harrison (DOM)

The 2025 Men's U23 NORCECA Pan American Cup was the eighth edition of the Men's U23 Pan-American Volleyball Cup. Eight teams participated in this edition held at the Domo Polideportivo in Guatemala City, Guatemala.

The Dominican Republic won their first men's U23 title, after defeated the United States 3–2 in final. Luke Harrison of the Dominican Republic won the Most Valuable Player award.

== Participation nations ==
Group A	Group B
Costa Rica; Guatemala; Suriname; Venezuela	Belize; Dominican Republic; Mexico; United States

== Competition format ==
Eight teams was divided into two pools. In the group stage each pool was played round robin. The first rank teams of each pool after group stage received byes into the semifinals. The second and third rank teams in each pool played in the quarterfinals.

== Competition venue ==
All matches
Guatemala City, Guatemala
Domo Polideportivo de la CDAG
Capacity: 7,500
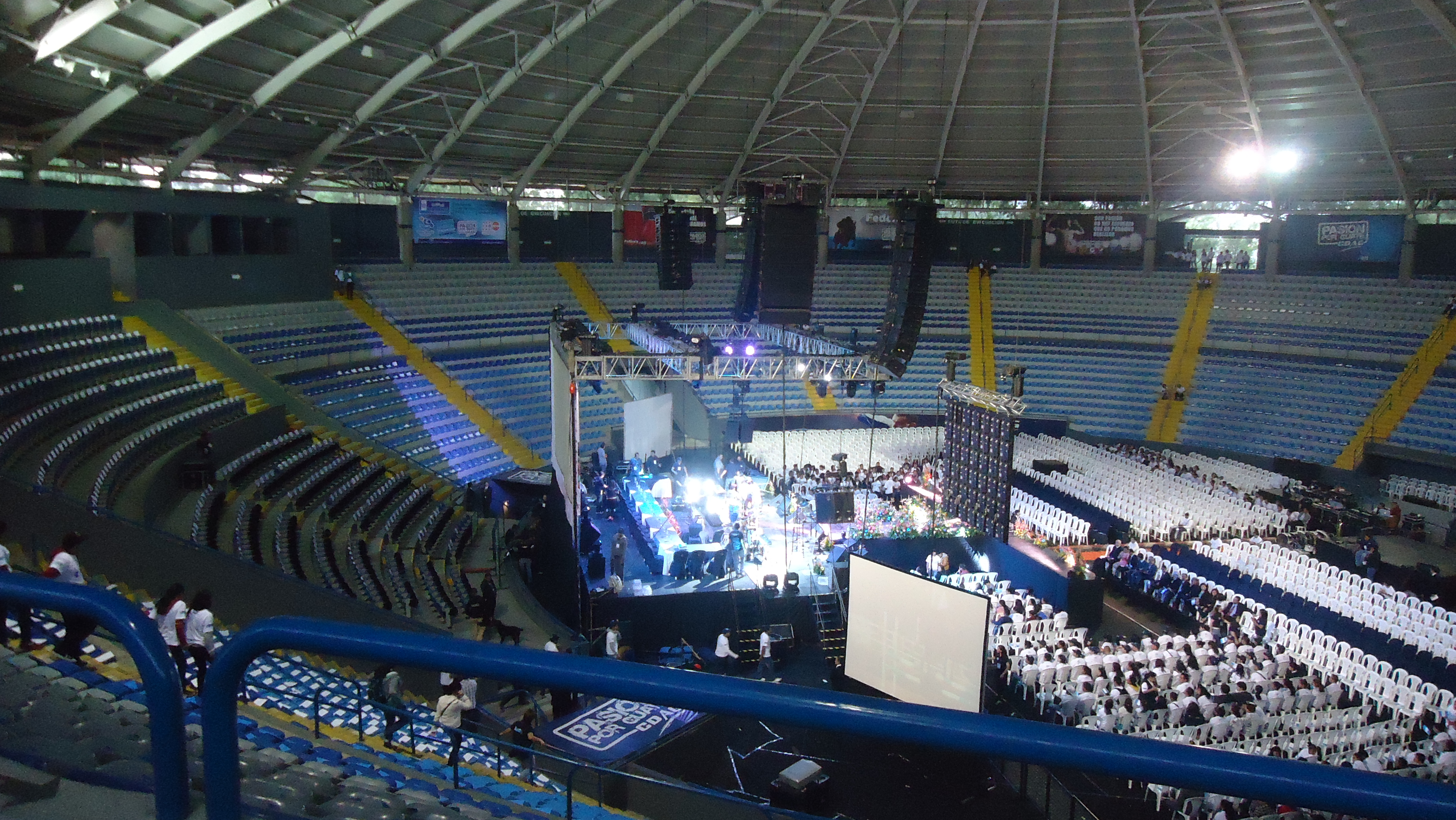

== Pool standing procedure ==
1. Number of matches won
2. Match points
3. Sets ratio
4. Points ratio
5. If the tie continues as per the point ratio between two teams, the priority will be given to the team which won the match between them. When the tie in points ratio is between three or more teams, a new classification of these teams in the terms of points 1, 2, 3 and 4 will be made taking into consideration only the matches in which they were opposed to each other.
- Match won 3–0 = 5 points
- Match won 3–1 = 4 points
- Match won 3–2 = 3 points
- Match lost 0–3 = 0 point
- Match lost 1–3 = 1 points
- Match lost 2–3 = 2 points
- Match forfeited = 0 points (0–25, 0–25, 0–25)

== Preliminary round ==
- All times are in local time (UTC−6)

=== Group A ===
Pos	Team	Pld	W	L	Pts	SPW	SPL	SPR	SW	SL	SR	Qualification
1	Venezuela	3	3	0	12	284	222	1.279	9	3	3.000	Semifinals
2	Guatemala	3	2	1	11	268	250	1.072	8	4	2.000	Quarterfinals
3	Costa Rica	3	1	2	6	249	275	0.905	5	7	0.714	Quarterfinals
4	Suriname	3	0	3	1	194	248	0.782	1	9	0.111	

Source: NORCECA

Date	Time		Score		Set 1	Set 2	Set 3	Set 4	Set 5	Total	Report
29 Jul	18:00	Costa Rica	1–3	Venezuela	25–21	19–25	16–25	11–25		71–96	P2 P3
29 Jul	20:00	Guatemala	3–0	Suriname	25–22	25–16	25–19			75–57	P2 P3
30 Jul	18:00	Suriname	0–3	Venezuela	15–25	17–25	20–25			52–75	P2 P3
30 Jul	20:00	Guatemala	3–1	Costa Rica	19–25	25–17	25–18	25–20		94–80	P2 P3
31 Jul	18:00	Suriname	1–3	Costa Rica	18–25	25–23	22–25	20–25		85–98	P2 P3
31 Jul	20:00	Guatemala	2–3	Venezuela	20–25	25–23	21–25	27–25	6–15	99–113	P2 P3

=== Group B ===
Pos	Team	Pld	W	L	Pts	SPW	SPL	SPR	SW	SL	SR	Qualification
1	Dominican Republic	3	3	0	12	292	264	1.106	9	3	3.000	Semifinals
2	United States	3	2	1	10	270	249	1.084	7	4	1.750	Quarterfinals
3	Mexico	3	1	2	7	304	307	0.990	6	7	0.857	Quarterfinals
4	Belize	3	0	3	1	209	255	0.820	1	9	0.111	

Source: NORCECA

Date	Time		Score		Set 1	Set 2	Set 3	Set 4	Set 5	Total	Report
29 Jul	14:00	Mexico	3–1	Belize	29–31	25–21	25–21	25–22		104–95	P2 P3
29 Jul	16:00	Dominican Republic	3–1	United States	23–25	26–24	31–29	25–16		105–94	P2 P3
30 Jul	14:00	Dominican Republic	3–0	Belize	25–22	25–16	25–23			75–61	P2 P3
30 Jul	16:00	Mexico	1–3	United States	23–25	18–25	27–25	23–25		91–100	P2 P3
31 Jul	14:00	Mexico	2–3	Dominican Republic	22–25	25–23	25–27	25–22	12–15	109–112	P2 P3
31 Jul	16:00	United States	3–0	Belize	26–24	25–16	25–13			76–53	P2 P3

== Final round ==
=== Championship bracket ===
Quarterfinals
B2	United States	3
A3	Costa Rica	0
A2	Guatemala	0
B3	Mexico	3

Semifinals
A1	Venezuela	0
B2	United States	3
B1	Dominican Republic	3
B3	Mexico	1

Finals
B2	United States	2
B1	Dominican Republic	3
Third place
A1	Venezuela	3
B3	Mexico	0

==== Quarterfinals ====
Date	Time		Score		Set 1	Set 2	Set 3	Set 4	Set 5	Total	Report
1 Aug	17:00	United States	3–0	Costa Rica	25–14	25–13	25–19			75–46	P2 P3
1 Aug	19:00	Guatemala	0–3	Mexico	16–25	18–25	20–25			54–75	P2 P3

==== Classification 5–8 ====
Date	Time		Score		Set 1	Set 2	Set 3	Set 4	Set 5	Total	Report
2 Aug	14:00	Suriname	0–3	Guatemala	23–25	20–25	17–25			60–75	P2 P3
2 Aug	16:00	Belize	2–3	Venezuela	25–23	21–25	22–25	25–16	10–15	103–104	P2 P3

==== Semifinals ====
Date	Time		Score		Set 1	Set 2	Set 3	Set 4	Set 5	Total	Report
2 Aug	18:00	Venezuela	0–3	United States	20–25	20–25	17–25			57–75	P2 P3
2 Aug	20:00	Dominican Republic	3–1	Mexico	25–21	23–25	25–21	25–20		98–87	P2 P3

===== 7th place match =====
Date	Time		Score		Set 1	Set 2	Set 3	Set 4	Set 5	Total	Report
3 Aug	12:00	Suriname	2–3	Belize	25–16	14–25	25–27	25–22	8–15	97–105	P2 P3

===== 5th place match =====
Date	Time		Score		Set 1	Set 2	Set 3	Set 4	Set 5	Total	Report
3 Aug	14:00	Guatemala	3–0	Costa Rica	26–24	25–22	25–14			76–60	P2 P3

==== 3rd place match ====
Date	Time		Score		Set 1	Set 2	Set 3	Set 4	Set 5	Total	Report
3 Aug	16:00	Venezuela	3–0	Mexico	25–23	25–21	25–22			75–66	P2 P3

==== Final ====
Date	Time		Score		Set 1	Set 2	Set 3	Set 4	Set 5	Total	Report
3 Aug	18:00	United States	2–3	Dominican Republic	23–25	25–21	25–23	19–25	14–16	106–110	P2 P3

== Final standing ==
Rank	Team
1st place, gold medalist(s)	Dominican Republic
2nd place, silver medalist(s)	United States
3rd place, bronze medalist(s)	Venezuela
4	Mexico
5	Guatemala
6	Costa Rica
7	Belize
8	Suriname

== Individual awards ==
- Most valuable player
  - Luke Harrison (DOM)
- Best scorer
  - Adrián José Figueroa (DOM)
- Best setter
  - Nathan Flayter (USA)
- Best opposite
  - Adrián José Figueroa (DOM)
- Best spikers
  - Carlos Eduardo Beroes (VEN)
  - Elezar Mejía (BIZ)
- Best middle blockers
  - Cameron Thorne (USA)
  - Moisés Alexander Ortiz (DOM)
- Best libero
  - Roberto Benschop (SUR)
- Best server
  - Melvin de Jesús (DOM)
- Best receiver
  - Oswaldo Chacón (CRC)
- Best digger
  - Roberto Benschop (SUR)
