= 2026 Men's U23 NORCECA Pan American Cup =

Tournament details
- Host country: El Salvador
- Dates: 20–28 September 2026
- Teams: 9
- Venue: 1 (in San Salvador host cities)

Final positions
- Champions: United States (1st title)
- Runners-up: Costa Rica
- Third place: Mexico

Tournament awards
- MVP: David Decker (USA)

The 2026 Men's U23 NORCECA Pan American Cup was the ninth edition of the Men's U23 Pan-American Volleyball Cup. Nine teams participated in this edition held in San Salvador, El Salvador.

The United States won their first title, after defeated Costa Rica 3–1 in final. David Decker of the United States won the Most Valuable Player award.

== Preliminary round ==
=== Group A ===
Pos	Team	Pld	W	L	Pts	SW	SL	SR	SPW	SPL	SPR	Qualification
1	Costa Rica	2	2	0	10	6	0	MAX	150	117	1.282	Quarterfinals
2	Mexico	2	1	1	4	3	4	0.750	163	152	1.072	Quarterfinals
3	Nicaragua	2	0	2	1	1	6	0.167	129	173	0.746	

Source: NORCECA

Date	Time		Score		Set 1	Set 2	Set 3	Set 4	Set 5	Total	Report
22 Sep	15:00	Mexico	3–1	Nicaragua	25–19	23–25	25–14	25–19		98–77	P2 P3
23 Sep	17:00	Mexico	0–3	Costa Rica	23–25	19–25	23–25			65–75	P2 P3
24 Sep	15:00	Costa Rica	3–0	Nicaragua	25–16	25–15	25–21			75–52	P2 P3

=== Group B ===
Pos	Team	Pld	W	L	Pts	SW	SL	SR	SPW	SPL	SPR	Qualification
1	United States	2	2	0	10	6	0	MAX	150	108	1.389	Semifinals
2	Dominican Republic	2	1	1	5	3	3	1.000	134	131	1.023	Quarterfinals
3	Trinidad and Tobago	2	0	2	0	0	6	0.000	105	150	0.700	

Source: NORCECA

Date	Time		Score		Set 1	Set 2	Set 3	Set 4	Set 5	Total	Report
22 Sep	17:00	Dominican Republic	3–0	Trinidad and Tobago	25–16	25–17	25–23			75–56	P2 P3
23 Sep	15:00	United States	3–0	Dominican Republic	25–19	25–18	25–22			75–59	P2 P3
24 Sep	17:00	United States	3–0	Trinidad and Tobago	25–15	25–19	25–15			75–49	P2 P3

=== Group C ===
Pos	Team	Pld	W	L	Pts	SW	SL	SR	SPW	SPL	SPR	Qualification
1	Guatemala	2	2	0	10	6	0	MAX	150	98	1.531	Semifinals
2	El Salvador	2	1	1	5	3	3	1.000	139	115	1.209	Quarterfinals
3	Grenada	2	0	2	0	0	6	0.000	74	150	0.493	

Source: NORCECA

Date	Time		Score		Set 1	Set 2	Set 3	Set 4	Set 5	Total	Report
22 Sep	19:00	El Salvador	3–0	Grenada	25–12	25–12	25–16			75–40	P2 P3
23 Sep	19:00	El Salvador	0–3	Guatemala	21–25	23–25	20–25			64–75	P2 P3
24 Sep	19:00	Guatemala	3–0	Grenada	25–13	25–12	25–9			75–34	P2 P3

== Bracket ==
Quarterfinals
C2	El Salvador	0
A2	Mexico	3
B2	Dominican Republic	0
A1	Costa Rica	3

Semifinals
B1	United States	3
A2	Mexico	0
C1	Guatemala	0
A1	Costa Rica	3

Final
B1	United States	3
A1	Costa Rica	1
Third place
A2	Mexico	3
C1	Guatemala	1

== Ninth place match ==
Date	Time		Score		Set 1	Set 2	Set 3	Set 4	Set 5	Total	Report
25 Sep	15:00	Trinidad and Tobago	3–0	Grenada	25–18	25–8	25–22			75–48	P2 P3

== Quarterfinals ==
Date	Time		Score		Set 1	Set 2	Set 3	Set 4	Set 5	Total	Report
25 Sep	17:00	Costa Rica	3–0	Dominican Republic	25–22	25–17	25–23			75–62	P2 P3
25 Sep	19:00	El Salvador	0–3	Mexico	14–25	18–25	20–25			52–75	P2 P3

== Seventh place match ==
Date	Time		Score		Set 1	Set 2	Set 3	Set 4	Set 5	Total	Report
26 Sep	15:00	Nicaragua	3–2	Trinidad and Tobago	25–18	25–22	15–25	19–25	16–14	100–104	P2 P3

== Semifinals ==
Date	Time		Score		Set 1	Set 2	Set 3	Set 4	Set 5	Total	Report
26 Sep	17:00	United States	3–0	Mexico	25–19	25–21	25–20			75–60	P2 P3
26 Sep	19:00	Guatemala	0–3	Costa Rica	13–25	17–25	12–25			42–75	P2 P3

== Fifth place match ==
Date	Time		Score		Set 1	Set 2	Set 3	Set 4	Set 5	Total	Report
27 Sep	12:00	El Salvador	0–3	Dominican Republic	15–25	15–25	19–25			49–75	P2 P3

== Third place match ==
Date	Time		Score		Set 1	Set 2	Set 3	Set 4	Set 5	Total	Report
27 Sep	14:00	Mexico	3–1	Guatemala	25–23	25–20	22–25	28–26		100–94	P2 P3

== Final ==
Date	Time		Score		Set 1	Set 2	Set 3	Set 4	Set 5	Total	Report
27 Sep	16:00	United States	3–1	Costa Rica	25–16	23–25	25–13	25–17		98–71	P2 P3

== Final standing ==
Rank	Team
1st place, gold medalist(s)	United States
2nd place, silver medalist(s)	Costa Rica
3rd place, bronze medalist(s)	Mexico
4	Guatemala
5	Dominican Republic
6	El Salvador
7	Nicaragua
8	Trinidad and Tobago
9	Grenada

== Individual awards ==
- Most valuable player
  - David Decker (USA)
- Best scorer
  - Stanley Grant (CRC)
- Best setter
  - Cameron Hoying (USA)
- Best Opposite
  - David Decker (USA)
- Best spikers
  - Malik Britton (DOM)
  - Trevor Herget (USA)
- Best blockers
  - Saúl Álvarez (GUA)
  - Diego Ruiz (MEX)
- Best libero
  - Osmar Peralta (NCA)
- Best server
  - David Decker (USA)
- Best receiver
  - Trevor Herget (USA)
- Best digger
  - Osmar Peralta (NCA)
