= 2013 FIVB Volleyball Men's U21 World Championship – European qualification =

The qualification for the 2013 FIVB Volleyball Men's U21 World Championship was held from 7–12 May 2013.

== Competing nations ==
Pool A	Pool B	Pool C	Pool D
Russia; Greece; Denmark; Montenegro; Austria	Belgium; France; Poland; Portugal; Latvia	Bulgaria; Germany; Estonia; Romania; Israel	Spain; Slovakia; Czech Republic; Serbia; Finland; Croatia

== Participating teams ==
- Host
  - Serbia
  - Russia
  - Bulgaria
  - France
- Qualified through 2012 Men's Junior European Volleyball Championship
  - Greece
  - Denmark
  - Montenegro
  - Austria
  - Belgium
  - Poland
  - Portugal
  - Latvia
  - Germany
  - Estonia
  - Israel
  - Romania
  - Spain
  - Slovakia
  - Finland
  - Croatia

== Pool A ==
Matches of Pool A were played in Anapa, Russia

Pos	Team	Pld	W	L	Pts	SPW	SPL	SPR	SW	SL	SR
1	Russia	4	4	0	12	324	231	1.403	12	1	12.000
2	Greece	4	3	1	9	288	236	1.220	9	3	3.000
3	Austria	4	2	2	6	292	304	0.961	7	6	1.167
4	Montenegro	4	1	3	3	249	314	0.793	3	10	0.300
5	Denmark	4	0	4	0	265	333	0.796	1	12	0.083

Date	Time		Score		Set 1	Set 2	Set 3	Set 4	Set 5	Total	Report
7 May	16:00	Montenegro	0–3	Greece	18–25	15–25	16–25			49–75	Report
7 May	18:30	Denmark	0–3	Russia	13–25	17–25	22–25			52–75	Report
8 May	16:00	Montenegro	3–1	Denmark	20–25	32–30	25–20	25–13		102–88	Report
8 May	18:30	Austria	1–3	Russia	17–25	25–23	21–25	17–25		80–98	Report
9 May	16:00	Greece	3–0	Denmark	25–18	25–18	25–20			75–56	Report
9 May	18:30	Austria	3–0	Montenegro	26–24	25–18	25–20			76–62	Report
10 May	16:00	Greece	3–0	Austria	25–21	25–16	25–18			75–55	Report
10 May	18:30	Russia	3–0	Montenegro	25–12	25–13	25–11			75–36	Report
11 May	16:00	Denmark	0–3	Austria	17–25	23–25	29–31			69–81	Report
11 May	18:30	Russia	3–0	Greece	24–26	19–25	20–25			63–76	Report

== Pool B ==
Matches of Pool B were played in Saint-Jean-d'Illac, France

Pos	Team	Pld	W	L	Pts	SPW	SPL	SPR	SW	SL	SR
1	France	4	4	0	11	326	271	1.203	12	2	6.000
2	Belgium	4	3	1	10	341	283	1.205	11	4	2.750
3	Poland	4	2	2	6	307	246	1.248	7	6	1.167
4	Portugal	4	1	3	3	218	279	0.781	3	9	0.333
5	Latvia	4	0	4	0	187	300	0.623	0	12	0.000

Date	Time		Score		Set 1	Set 2	Set 3	Set 4	Set 5	Total	Report
7 May	16:30	Portugal	0–3	Belgium	17–25	17–25	11–25			45–75	Report
7 May	19:00	Poland	0–3	France	22–25	20–25	23–25			65–75	Report
8 May	16:30	Portugal	0–3	France	17–25	17–25	19–25			53–75	Report
8 May	19:00	Belgium	3–0	Latvia	25–19	25–14	25–12			75–45	Report
9 May	16:30	France	3–0	Latvia	25–15	25–16	25–19			75–50	Report
9 May	19:00	Poland	3–0	Portugal	25–17	25–15	25–13			75–45	Report
10 May	16:30	Latvia	0–3	Portugal	14–25	21–25	19–25			54–75	Report
10 May	19:30	Belgium	3–1	Poland	27–25	25–21	13–25	25–21		90–92	Report
11 May	16:30	France	3–2	Belgium	18–25	17–25	26–24	25–21	15–6	101–101	Report
11 May	19:00	Latvia	0–3	Poland	14–25	11–25	11–25			36–75	Report

== Pool C ==
Matches of Pool C will be played in Sofia, Bulgaria.

Pos	Team	Pld	W	L	Pts	SPW	SPL	SPR	SW	SL	SR
1	Estonia	4	4	0	10	360	310	1.161	12	4	3.000
2	Germany	4	3	1	8	348	304	1.145	9	6	1.500
3	Bulgaria	4	2	2	7	306	287	1.066	8	6	1.333
4	Romania	4	1	3	4	314	337	0.932	6	9	0.667
5	Israel	4	0	4	1	248	338	0.734	2	12	0.167

Date	Time		Score		Set 1	Set 2	Set 3	Set 4	Set 5	Total	Report
8 May	16:00	Romania	2–3	Estonia	21–25	19–25	25–22	25–22	10–15	100–109	
8 May	18:30	Israel	0–3	Bulgaria	21–25	17–25	15–25			53–75	
9 May	16:00	Germany	3–2	Israel	25–20	23–25	25–5	25–27	15–13	113–90	
9 May	18:30	Bulgaria	3–0	Romania	25–23	25–19	25–16			75–58	
10 May	16:00	Romania	1–3	Germany	16–25	18–25	25–22	22–25		81–97	
10 May	18:30	Estonia	3–2	Bulgaria	25–21	18–25	18–25	25–20	15–7	101–98	Report
11 May	16:00	Israel	0–3	Romania	18–25	17–25	21–25			56–75	
11 May	18:30	Germany	0–3	Estonia	20–25	21–25	22–25			63–75	Report
12 May	16:00	Estonia	3–0	Israel	25–19	25–17	25–13			75–49	
12 May	18:30	Bulgaria	0–3	Germany	15–25	23–25	20–25			58–75	Report

== Pool D ==
Matches of Pool D will be played in Arilje, Serbia.

Pos	Team	Pld	W	L	Pts	SPW	SPL	SPR	SW	SL	SR
1	Serbia	5	5	0	15	424	341	1.243	15	2	7.500
2	Spain	5	4	1	12	389	303	1.284	12	4	3.000
3	Finland	5	2	3	6	417	456	0.914	9	11	0.818
4	Czech Republic	5	2	3	6	389	420	0.926	7	11	0.636
5	Slovakia	5	2	3	5	397	445	0.892	7	12	0.583
6	Croatia	5	0	5	1	414	465	0.890	4	12	0.333

Date	Time		Score		Set 1	Set 2	Set 3	Set 4	Set 5	Total	Report
7 May	15:00	Spain	3–0	Czech Republic	25–17	25–18	25–15			75–50	Report
7 May	17:30	Finland	3–2	Croatia	30–28	18–25	13–25	25–15	15–11	101–104	Report
7 May	20:00	Serbia	3–0	Slovakia	25–20	25–19	27–25			77–64	Report
8 May	15:00	Croatia	1–3	Spain	19–25	25–20	21–25	19–25		84–95	Report
8 May	17:30	Slovakia	3–2	Finland	26–28	28–26	25–27	28–26	15–8	122–115	Report
8 May	20:00	Serbia	3–1	Czech Republic	25–21	24–26	25–23	25–15		99–85	Report
9 May	15:00	Spain	3–0	Slovakia	25–9	25–17	25–16			75–42	Report
9 May	17:30	Czech Republic	3–1	Croatia	27–25	25–23	23–25	25–23		100–96	Report
9 May	20:00	Finland	1–3	Serbia	18–25	18–25	25–23	13–25		74–98	Report
10 May	15:00	Slovakia	1–3	Czech Republic	9–25	23–25	25–22	18–25		75–97	Report
10 May	17:30	Finland	0–3	Spain	18–25	23–25	11–25			52–75	Report
10 May	20:00	Serbia	3–0	Croatia	25–21	25–16	25–12			75–49	Report
11 May	15:00	Czech Republic	0–3	Finland	18–25	20–25	19–25			57–75	Report
11 May	17:30	Croatia	1–3	Slovakia	25–19	19–25	16–25	21–25		81–94	Report
11 May	20:00	Spain	0–3	Serbia	23–25	23–25	23–25			69–75	Report
