= 2018 Men's U23 Pan-American Volleyball Cup =

Tournament details
- Host country: Guatemala
- Dates: 15–20 October
- Teams: 5
- Venue: 1 (in 1 host city)

Final positions
- Champions: Cuba (2nd title)

Tournament awards
- MVP: Roamy Alonso (CUB)

The 2018 Men's U23 Pan-American Volleyball Cup was the fourth edition of the bi-annual men's volleyball tournament, played by five countries from 15 to 20 October at the Domo Polideportivo in Guatemala City, Guatemala.

== Competing nations ==
Teams

Cuba
Guatemala
Mexico
Nicaragua
Peru

== Pool standing procedure ==
Match won 3–0: 5 points for the winner, 0 point for the loser
Match won 3–1: 4 points for the winner, 1 points for the loser
Match won 3–2: 3 points for the winner, 2 points for the loser
The first criterion is the number of matches won, second criterion is points gained by the team
In case of tie, the teams were classified according to the following criteria:
points ratio and sets ratio

== Competition format ==
The competition format for the 2018 Men's U23 Pan-American Volleyball Cup consists of two phases, the first is a round robin round between all five competing nations. After the round robin finishes, 3rd and 4th place nations according to ranking will play for the bronze and 1st and 2nd place nations according to ranking will play for the gold.

== Round robin ==
- All times are Central Time Zone (UTC−06:00)

| Pos | Team | Pld | W | L | Pts | SPW | SPL | SPR | SW | SL | SR | Qualification |
|---|---|---|---|---|---|---|---|---|---|---|---|---|
| 1 | Cuba | 4 | 4 | 0 | 20 | 305 | 200 | 1.525 | 12 | 0 | MAX | Final |
| 2 | Mexico | 4 | 3 | 1 | 15 | 285 | 273 | 1.044 | 9 | 3 | 3.000 | Final |
| 3 | Guatemala | 4 | 2 | 2 | 9 | 296 | 295 | 1.003 | 6 | 7 | 0.857 | Third place match |
| 4 | Nicaragua | 4 | 1 | 3 | 3 | 280 | 326 | 0.859 | 3 | 11 | 0.273 | Third place match |
| 5 | Peru | 4 | 0 | 4 | 3 | 286 | 358 | 0.799 | 3 | 12 | 0.250 | |

| Date | Time | | Score | | Set 1 | Set 2 | Set 3 | Set 4 | Set 5 | Total | Report |
|---|---|---|---|---|---|---|---|---|---|---|---|
| 15 Oct | 15:00 | Cuba | 3–0 | Nicaragua | 25–17 | 25–14 | 25–13 | | | 75–44 | P2 P3 |
| 15 Oct | 17:00 | Guatemala | 3–1 | Peru | 25–15 | 19–25 | 25–17 | 27–25 | | 96–82 | P2 P3 |
| 16 Oct | 15:00 | Peru | 0–3 | Cuba | 19–25 | 10–25 | 13–25 | | | 42–75 | P2 P3 |
| 16 Oct | 17:00 | Guatemala | 0–3 | Mexico | 23–25 | 24–26 | 23–25 | | | 70–76 | P2 P3 |
| 17 Oct | 15:00 | Peru | 2–3 | Nicaragua | 25–23 | 22–25 | 18–25 | 26–24 | 10–15 | 101–112 | P2 P3 |
| 17 Oct | 18:00 | Mexico | 0–3 | Cuba | 26–28 | 17–25 | 16–25 | | | 59–78 | P2 P3 |
| 18 Oct | 15:00 | Mexico | 3–0 | Peru | 25–22 | 25–21 | 25–18 | | | 75–61 | P2 P3 |
| 18 Oct | 17:00 | Guatemala | 3–0 | Nicaragua | 25–21 | 25–18 | 25–21 | | | 75–60 | P2 P3 |
| 19 Oct | 15:00 | Nicaragua | 0–3 | Mexico | 22–25 | 20–25 | 22–25 | | | 64–75 | P2 P3 |
| 19 Oct | 17:00 | Guatemala | 0–3 | Cuba | 14–25 | 16–25 | 25–27 | | | 55–77 | P2 P3 |

== Finals ==
=== Third place match ===
| Date | Time | | Score | | Set 1 | Set 2 | Set 3 | Set 4 | Set 5 | Total | Report |
|---|---|---|---|---|---|---|---|---|---|---|---|
| 20 Oct | 14:00 | Guatemala | 3–1 | Nicaragua | 28–26 | 27–25 | 22–25 | 25–16 | | 102–92 | P2 P3 |

=== Final ===
| Date | Time | | Score | | Set 1 | Set 2 | Set 3 | Set 4 | Set 5 | Total | Report |
|---|---|---|---|---|---|---|---|---|---|---|---|
| 20 Oct | 17:05 | Cuba | 3–0 | Mexico | 25–16 | 25–16 | 25–12 | | | 75–44 | P2 P3 |

== Final standing ==
| Rank | Team |
|---|---|
| 1st place, gold medalist(s) | Cuba |
| 2nd place, silver medalist(s) | Mexico |
| 3rd place, bronze medalist(s) | Guatemala |
| 4 | Nicaragua |
| 5 | Peru |

2018 Men's U23 Pan-American Cup champions

Cuba
2nd title

== Individual awards ==
- Most valuable player
  - Roamy Alonso (CUB)
- Best scorer
  - Carlos López (GUA)
- Best Spikers
  - Osniel Melgarejo (CUB)
  - Miguel López (CUB)
- Best Middle Blocker
  - Josué López (MEX)
  - José Masso (CUB)
- Best setter
  - Adán Ruano (GUA)
- Best Opposite
  - Miguel Gutiérrez (CUB)
- Best libero
  - Jonathan Nakamatsu (PER)
- Best digger
  - Miguel Castillo (NCA)
- Best receiver
  - Jonathan Nakamatsu (PER)
- Best server
  - Osniel Melgarejo (CUB)
