= Brazil men's national under-23 volleyball team =

Men's national volleyball team representing Brazil

Brazil
- Association: CBV
- Confederation: CSV

Uniforms
Home	Away

FIVB U23 World Championship
- Appearances: 3 (First in 2013)
- Best result: (gold) Champions : (2013)

The Brazil men's national under-23 volleyball team represents Brazil in international men's volleyball competitions and friendly matches under the age 23 and it is ruled by the Brazilian Volleyball Federation that is a member of South American volleyball body Confederación Sudamericana de Voleibol (CSV) and the international volleyball body government the Fédération Internationale de Volleyball (FIVB).

== Results ==
=== U23 World Championship ===
Champions Runners up Third place Fourth place

World Championship
Year	Round	Position	GP	MW	ML	SW	SL	Squad
(Brazil) 2013	Final	Champions	7	7	0	21	4	Squad
(United Arab Emirates) 2015	Group round	5th place	7	5	2	18	9	Squad
(Egypt) 2017	Semifinals	4th place	7	5	2	24	12	Squad
Total	1 Titles	3/3	—	—	—	—	—	—

=== U23 South America Championship ===
Champions Runners up Third place Fourth place

South America Championship
Year	Round	Position	GP	MW	ML	SW	SL	Squad
(Brazil) 2014	Round robin	Champions	5	5	0	15	1	Squad
(Colombia) 2016	Final	Champions	4	4	0	12	1	Squad
Total	2 Titles	2/2	—	—	—	—	—	—

== Team ==
=== Current squad ===
The following is the Brazilian roster in the 2015 FIVB Volleyball Men's U23 World Championship.

Head coach: Roberley Leonaldo

No.	Name	Date of birth	Height	Weight	Spike	Block	2015 club
1	Alan Souza	21 March 1994	1.98 m (6 ft 6 in)	80 kg (180 lb)	336 cm (132 in)	320 cm (130 in)	(Brazil) Sada/Cruzeiro
2	Wagner Silva	29 April 1993	1.96 m (6 ft 5 in)	93 kg (205 lb)	335 cm (132 in)	305 cm (120 in)	(Brazil) Montes Claros Volei
3	Eder Kock	4 July 1993	2.06 m (6 ft 9 in)	88 kg (194 lb)	0 cm (0 in)	0 cm (0 in)	(Brazil) Sada/Cruzeiro
4	Rogério Carvalho	20 February 1995	1.66 m (5 ft 5 in)	66 kg (146 lb)	0 cm (0 in)	0 cm (0 in)	(Brazil) Maringá Volei
5	Leandro Souza	13 January 1993	1.97 m (6 ft 6 in)	80 kg (180 lb)	335 cm (132 in)	320 cm (130 in)	(Brazil) Sesi-SP
6	Carlos Barreto	8 August 1994	1.99 m (6 ft 6 in)	81 kg (179 lb)	0 cm (0 in)	0 cm (0 in)	(Brazil) Sada/Cruzeiro
7	Fernando Kreling	13 January 1996	1.85 m (6 ft 1 in)	90 kg (200 lb)	319 cm (126 in)	301 cm (119 in)	(Brazil) Sada/Cruzeiro
8	Henrique Batagim	1 August 1993	1.96 m (6 ft 5 in)	98 kg (216 lb)	334 cm (131 in)	315 cm (124 in)	(Brazil) Vôlei Canoas
9	João Ferreira	17 March 1993	1.91 m (6 ft 3 in)	86 kg (190 lb)	339 cm (133 in)	308 cm (121 in)	(Brazil) Minas T.C.
10	Flavio Gualberto	22 April 1993	1.99 m (6 ft 6 in)	84 kg (185 lb)	344 cm (135 in)	320 cm (130 in)	(Brazil) Minas T.C.
11	Thiago Veloso (C)	15 August 1993	1.84 m (6 ft 0 in)	77 kg (170 lb)	313 cm (123 in)	294 cm (116 in)	(Brazil) Sesi-SP
12	Douglas Souza	20 August 1995	1.99 m (6 ft 6 in)	75 kg (165 lb)	338 cm (133 in)	317 cm (125 in)	(Brazil) Sesi-SP

== Former squads ==
=== U23 World Championship ===
- 2013 – Gold medal
  Alan Souza, Fernando Kreling, Otávio Pinto, Lucas Lóh, Thiago Veloso, Ricardo Lucarelli Souza (c), Felipe Quaresma, Ary Nóbrega, Matheus Cunda, Leandro Santos, Rafael Araújo, Ricardo Rego and Guilherme Kachel
- 2015 – 5th place
  Alan Souza, Wagner Silva, Eder Kock, Rogério Filho, Leandro Santos, Carlos Eduardo Silva, Fernando Kreling, Henrique Batagim, João Ferreira, Flavio Gualberto, Thiago Veloso (c) and Douglas Souza
- 2017 – 4th place
  Leonardo Nascimento, Felipe Roque, Rogério Filho, Fabio Rodrigues, Eduardo Sobrinho, Nicolas Santos, Rodrigo Leão, Douglas Souza, Gabriel Candido, Fernando Kreling (c), Romulo Silva, and Matheus Santos

== See also ==
- Brazil men's national volleyball team
- Brazil men's national under-21 volleyball team
- Brazil men's national under-19 volleyball team
- Brazil women's national under-23 volleyball team
- Brazil women's national under-20 volleyball team
- Brazil women's national under-18 volleyball team
