= 2011 Boys' Youth Pan-American Volleyball Cup =

Tournament details
- Host country: Mexico
- Dates: July 9–17, 2011
- Teams: 6
- Venue: 1 (in Mexicali host cities)

Final positions
- Champions: Brazil (1st title)
- Runners-up: Puerto Rico
- Third place: United States

Tournament awards
- MVP: Carlos Acosta (PUR)

The 2011 Boys' Youth Pan-American Volleyball Cup was the first edition of the annual men's volleyball tournament, played by six countries from July 9–17, 2011 in Mexicali, Mexico.

== Competing nations ==
Group A	Group B
Brazil; Costa Rica; Puerto Rico	Mexico; Trinidad and Tobago; United States

== Preliminary round ==
=== Group A ===
Pos	Team	Pld	W	L	Pts	SPW	SPL	SPR	SW	SL	SR	Qualification
1	Brazil	2	2	0	6	150	68	2.206	6	0	MAX	Semifinals
2	Puerto Rico	2	1	1	3	119	109	1.092	3	3	1.000	Quarterfinals
3	Costa Rica	2	0	2	0	58	150	0.387	0	6	0.000	Quarterfinals

Date	Time		Score		Set 1	Set 2	Set 3	Set 4	Set 5	Total	Report
11 July	17:00	Brazil	3–0	Puerto Rico	25–6	26–8	25–10			76–24	P2
12 July	17:00	Puerto Rico	3–0	Costa Rica	25–9	25–10	25–15			75–34	P2
13 July	17:00	Brazil	3–0	Costa Rica	25–17	25–9	25–18			75–44	P2

=== Group B ===
Pos	Team	Pld	W	L	Pts	SPW	SPL	SPR	SW	SL	SR	Qualification
1	Mexico	2	2	0	5	182	157	1.159	6	2	3.000	Semifinals
2	United States	2	1	1	4	184	142	1.296	5	3	1.667	Quarterfinals
3	Trinidad and Tobago	2	0	2	0	83	150	0.553	0	6	0.000	Quarterfinals

Date	Time		Score		Set 1	Set 2	Set 3	Set 4	Set 5	Total	Report
11 July	19:00	Mexico	3–0	Trinidad and Tobago	25–19	26–18	25–11			76–48	P2
12 July	19:00	United States	3–0	Trinidad and Tobago	25–12	25–10	25–13			75–35	P2
13 July	19:00	Mexico	3–2	United States	25–21	19–25	21–25	25–27	15–13	105–111	P2

== Final round ==
=== Championship bracket ===
Quarterfinals
B2	United States	3
A3	Costa Rica	0
A3	Puerto Rico	3
B2	Trinidad and Tobago	0

Semifinals
A1	Brazil	3
B2	United States	0
B1	Mexico	2
A2	Puerto Rico	3
Fifth Place Match
A3	Costa Rica	3
B3	Trinidad and Tobago	2

Finals
A1	Brazil	3
A2	Puerto Rico	0
Third Place Match
B1	Mexico	0
B2	United States	3

=== Quarterfinals ===
Date	Time		Score		Set 1	Set 2	Set 3	Set 4	Set 5	Total	Report
14 July	17:00	Puerto Rico	3–0	Trinidad and Tobago	25–17	24–14	25–18			74–49	P2
14 July	19:00	United States	3–0	Costa Rica	25–19	25–4	28–12			78–35	79–35

=== Semifinals ===
Date	Time		Score		Set 1	Set 2	Set 3	Set 4	Set 5	Total	Report
15 July	17:00	Brazil	3–0	United States	25–19	25–23	25–21			75–63	P2
15 July	19:00	Mexico	2–3	Puerto Rico	25–17	23–25	21–25	25–20	13–15	107–102	107–102

=== Fifth place match ===
Date	Time		Score		Set 1	Set 2	Set 3	Set 4	Set 5	Total	Report
15 July	15:00	Trinidad and Tobago	2–3	Costa Rica	25–13	20–25	25–13	21–25	12–15	103–91	

=== Bronze medal match ===
Date	Time		Score		Set 1	Set 2	Set 3	Set 4	Set 5	Total	Report
16 July	17:00	United States	3–0	Mexico	25–23	25–19	25–21			75–63	75–63

=== Final ===
Date	Time		Score		Set 1	Set 2	Set 3	Set 4	Set 5	Total	Report
16 July	19:00	Brazil	3–0	Puerto Rico	25–15	25–11	25–16			75–42	75–42

== Final standing ==
Rank	Team
1st place, gold medalist(s)	Brazil
2nd place, silver medalist(s)	Puerto Rico
3rd place, bronze medalist(s)	United States
4	Mexico
5	Costa Rica
6	Trinidad and Tobago

2011 Boys' Youth Pan-American Cup champions

Brazil
1st title

== Individual awards ==
- Most valuable player
  - Carlos Acosta (PUR)
- Best scorer
  - Brandon Legall (TRI)
- Best spiker
  - João Ferreira (BRA)
- Best blocker
  - Alan Souza (BRA)
- Best server
  - Brandon Legall (TRI)
- Best digger
  - Luis Bertran (PUR)
- Best setter
  - Thiago Veloso (BRA)
- Best receiver
  - Rogério Carvalho (BRA)
- Best libero
  - Luis Bertran (PUR)
