= 2013 FIVB Volleyball Men's U21 World Championship =

2013 Men's U21 World Championship
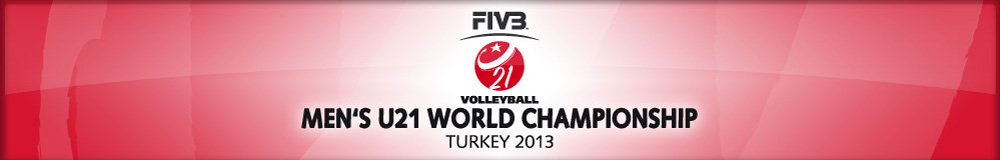

Tournament details
- Host country: Turkey
- Dates: 22 August – 1 September
- Teams: 20
- Venues: 2 (in 2 host cities)

Final positions
- Champions: Russia (9th title)

Tournament awards
- MVP: (Russia) Victor Poletaev

The 2013 FIVB Volleyball Men's U21 World Championship was held in Turkey for ten days, from 22 August to 1 September 2013. This was the first edition of the tournament that features 20 teams.

== Competition formula ==
The 20 teams will be divided into four pools of five teams each and will play a round-robin tournament. The bottom-ranked team of each pool will play classification matches for 17th-20th place in a round-robin system.

The other 16 teams progress to the Eight Finals which consists of a playoff (1st of Pool A against 4th of Pool B etc.). The winners of the playoff matches will advance to the quarterfinals, semifinals and finals to be classified from 1st to 8th while the losers of playoff match will play classification matches, with a similar quarterfinals, semifinals and finals system, to be classified from 9th to 16th.

== Qualification ==
Means of qualification	Date	Host	Vacancies	Qualified
Host country	18 March 2012	Lausanne, Switzerland	1	Turkey
2013 African Junior Championship	2–9 March 2013	Sidi Bou Said, Tunisia	4	Tunisia
2013 African Junior Championship	2–9 March 2013	Sidi Bou Said, Tunisia	4	Egypt
2013 African Junior Championship	2–9 March 2013	Sidi Bou Said, Tunisia	4	Rwanda
2013 African Junior Championship	2–9 March 2013	Sidi Bou Said, Tunisia	4	Morocco
2012 Asian Junior Championship	27 Sep–5 Oct 2012	Urmia, Iran	4	Japan
2012 Asian Junior Championship	27 Sep–5 Oct 2012	Urmia, Iran	4	China
2012 Asian Junior Championship	27 Sep–5 Oct 2012	Urmia, Iran	4	Iran
2012 Asian Junior Championship	27 Sep–5 Oct 2012	Urmia, Iran	4	India
2012 European Junior Championship	24 Aug–2 Sep 2012	Gdynia, Poland & Randers, Denmark	1	Italy
European Qualification Tournament Pool A	7–11 May 2013	Anapa, Russia	1	Russia
European Qualification Tournament Pool B	7–11 May 2013	Saint-Jean-d'Illac, France	1	France
European Qualification Tournament Pool C	8–12 May 2013	Sofia, Bulgaria	1	Estonia
European Qualification Tournament Pool D	7–11 May 2013	Arilje, Serbia	1	Serbia
2012 NORCECA Junior Championship	27 Aug–1 Sep 2012	Colorado Springs, United States	3	United States
2012 NORCECA Junior Championship	27 Aug–1 Sep 2012	Colorado Springs, United States	3	Canada
2012 NORCECA Junior Championship	27 Aug–1 Sep 2012	Colorado Springs, United States	3	Mexico
2012 South American Junior Championship	23–27 October 2012	Saquarema, Brazil	3	Brazil
2012 South American Junior Championship	23–27 October 2012	Saquarema, Brazil	3	Argentina
2012 South American Junior Championship	23–27 October 2012	Saquarema, Brazil	3	Venezuela
Total			20	

== Pools composition ==
Pool A	Pool B	Pool C	Pool D
Turkey (Hosts)	Argentina	Serbia	Russia
China	Iran	United States	Brazil
Egypt	Japan	Tunisia	Italy
Morocco	Mexico	Canada	France
India	Estonia	Rwanda	Venezuela

== Venues ==
- Başkent Volleyball Hall, Ankara, Turkey – Pool A, B and Final round
- Atatürk Sport Hall, İzmir, Turkey – Pool C, D and Final round

== Pool standing procedure ==
1. Match points
2. Number of matches won
3. Sets ratio
4. Points ratio
5. Result of the last match between the tied teams

Match won 3–0 or 3–1: 3 match points for the winner, 0 match points for the loser
Match won 3–2: 2 match points for the winner, 1 match point for the loser

== Preliminary round ==
- All times are Eastern European Summer Time (UTC+03:00).

=== Pool A ===
Pos	Team	Pld	W	L	Pts	SW	SL	SR	SPW	SPL	SPR	Qualification
1	Turkey	4	4	0	11	12	2	6.000	334	272	1.228	Round of 16
2	India	4	3	1	9	9	5	1.800	321	293	1.096	Round of 16
3	China	4	1	3	5	7	9	0.778	341	347	0.983	Round of 16
4	Egypt	4	1	3	3	6	11	0.545	356	388	0.918	Round of 16
5	Morocco	4	1	3	2	4	11	0.364	312	364	0.857	17th–20th places

Date	Time		Score		Set 1	Set 2	Set 3	Set 4	Set 5	Total	Report
22 Aug	14:30	China	3–0	Morocco	25–21	25–19	25–21			75–61	P2 P3
22 Aug	19:30	Turkey	3–0	India	25–16	25–17	25–17			75–50	P2 P3
23 Aug	15:00	Egypt	3–2	China	25–22	18–25	18–25	25–21	18–16	104–109	P2 P3
23 Aug	19:45	Morocco	0–3	Turkey	24–26	21–25	22–25			67–76	P2 P3
24 Aug	14:30	India	3–1	Morocco	23–25	25–18	26–24	25–11		99–78	P2 P3
24 Aug	19:40	Turkey	3–0	Egypt	26–24	25–23	25–13			76–60	P2 P3
25 Aug	14:30	Egypt	1–3	India	25–22	21–25	16–25	16–25		78–97	P2 P3
25 Aug	19:30	China	2–3	Turkey	25–21	19–25	25–21	20–25	6–15	95–107	P2 P3
26 Aug	12:00	India	3–0	China	25–21	25–23	25–18			75–62	P2 P3
26 Aug	14:30	Morocco	3–2	Egypt	18–25	16–25	25–23	32–30	15–11	106–114	P2 P3

=== Pool B ===
Pos	Team	Pld	W	L	Pts	SW	SL	SR	SPW	SPL	SPR	Qualification
1	Iran	4	4	0	12	12	1	12.000	329	261	1.261	Round of 16
2	Argentina	4	3	1	9	9	4	2.250	310	283	1.095	Round of 16
3	Japan	4	1	3	4	5	10	0.500	354	360	0.983	Round of 16
4	Mexico	4	1	3	3	4	10	0.400	292	345	0.846	Round of 16
5	Estonia	4	1	3	2	6	11	0.545	363	399	0.910	17th–20th places

Date	Time		Score		Set 1	Set 2	Set 3	Set 4	Set 5	Total	Report
22 Aug	12:00	Iran	3–1	Estonia	22–25	25–11	25–17	25–22		97–75	P2 P3
22 Aug	17:00	Japan	3–1	Mexico	23–25	29–27	25–17	25–16		102–85	P2 P3
23 Aug	12:00	Estonia	3–2	Japan	27–29	25–23	19–25	26–24	15–8	112–109	P2 P3
23 Aug	17:50	Argentina	0–3	Iran	19–25	20–25	18–25			57–75	P2 P3
24 Aug	12:00	Japan	0–3	Argentina	26–28	20–25	26–28			72–81	P2 P3
24 Aug	17:00	Mexico	3–1	Estonia	25–22	25–19	17–25	29–27		96–93	P2 P3
25 Aug	12:00	Argentina	3–0	Mexico	25–22	25–14	25–17			75–53	P2 P3
25 Aug	17:00	Iran	3–0	Japan	28–26	29–27	25–18			82–71	P2 P3
26 Aug	17:20	Mexico	0–3	Iran	20–25	21–25	16–25			57–75	P2 P3
26 Aug	19:30	Estonia	1–3	Argentina	19–25	25–22	17–25	21–25		82–97	P2 P3

=== Pool C ===
Pos	Team	Pld	W	L	Pts	SW	SL	SR	SPW	SPL	SPR	Qualification
1	Serbia	4	4	0	12	12	1	12.000	326	260	1.254	Round of 16
2	United States	4	2	2	6	7	7	1.000	329	290	1.134	Round of 16
3	Canada	4	2	2	6	7	7	1.000	309	314	0.984	Round of 16
4	Tunisia	4	2	2	6	7	7	1.000	309	314	0.984	Round of 16
5	Rwanda	4	0	4	0	1	12	0.083	234	329	0.711	17th–20th places

Date	Time		Score		Set 1	Set 2	Set 3	Set 4	Set 5	Total	Report
22 Aug	12:00	United States	3–1	Rwanda	25–11	25–18	27–29	25–14		102–72	P2 P3
22 Aug	17:00	Tunisia	1–3	Canada	15–25	15–25	29–27	19–25		78–102	P2 P3
23 Aug	12:00	Rwanda	0–3	Tunisia	12–25	15–25	18–25			45–75	P2 P3
23 Aug	17:00	Serbia	3–0	United States	25–23	25–23	25–17			75–63	P2 P3
24 Aug	12:00	Tunisia	0–3	Serbia	17–25	25–27	24–26			66–78	P2 P3
24 Aug	14:30	Canada	3–0	Rwanda	25–17	27–25	25–22			77–64	P2 P3
25 Aug	12:00	Serbia	3–1	Canada	23–25	25–18	25–16	25–19		98–78	P2 P3
25 Aug	17:00	United States	1–3	Tunisia	23–25	19–25	25–16	22–25		89–91	P2 P3
26 Aug	12:00	Canada	0–3	United States	15–25	15–25	22–25			52–75	P2 P3
26 Aug	14:30	Rwanda	0–3	Serbia	13–25	20–25	20–25			53–75	P2 P3

=== Pool D ===
Pos	Team	Pld	W	L	Pts	SW	SL	SR	SPW	SPL	SPR	Qualification
1	Russia	4	3	1	9	11	6	1.833	397	344	1.154	Round of 16
2	France	4	3	1	8	9	5	1.800	315	298	1.057	Round of 16
3	Brazil	4	2	2	8	10	6	1.667	367	344	1.067	Round of 16
4	Italy	4	2	2	5	6	8	0.750	318	331	0.961	Round of 16
5	Venezuela	4	0	4	0	1	12	0.083	245	325	0.754	17th–20th places

Date	Time		Score		Set 1	Set 2	Set 3	Set 4	Set 5	Total	Report
22 Aug	14:30	Brazil	3–0	Italy	25–21	35–33	25–23			85–77	P2 P3
22 Aug	19:30	France	3–0	Venezuela	25–17	26–24	25–18			76–59	P2 P3
23 Aug	14:30	Italy	0–3	France	19–25	16–25	23–25			58–75	P2 P3
23 Aug	19:30	Russia	3–2	Brazil	25–17	23–25	25–20	21–25	16–14	110–101	P2 P3
24 Aug	17:00	France	0–3	Russia	17–25	22–25	18–25			57–75	P2 P3
24 Aug	19:30	Venezuela	0–3	Italy	15–25	16–25	25–27			56–77	P2 P3
25 Aug	14:30	Russia	3–1	Venezuela	25–20	25–16	22–25	25–19		97–80	P2 P3
25 Aug	19:30	Brazil	2–3	France	23–25	18–25	25–17	26–24	14–16	106–107	P2 P3
26 Aug	17:00	Venezuela	0–3	Brazil	14–25	23–25	13–25			50–75	P2 P3
26 Aug	19:40	Italy	3–2	Russia	23–25	27–25	30–28	11–25	15–12	106–115	P2 P3

== Final round ==
- All times are Eastern European Summer Time (UTC+03:00).

=== 17th–20th places ===
Pos	Team	Pld	W	L	Pts	SW	SL	SR	SPW	SPL	SPR
1	Estonia	3	3	0	8	9	2	4.500	268	221	1.213
2	Morocco	3	1	2	4	6	6	1.000	265	263	1.008
3	Venezuela	3	1	2	4	5	7	0.714	264	262	1.008
4	Rwanda	3	1	2	2	3	8	0.375	212	263	0.806

Date	Time	Venue		Score		Set 1	Set 2	Set 3	Set 4	Set 5	Total	Report
29 Aug	11:00	ASH	Morocco	2–3	Estonia	25–22	22–25	30–28	24–26	12–15	113–116	113–116
29 Aug	13:56	ASH	Rwanda	3–2	Venezuela	27–25	23–25	18–25	25–21	17–15	110–111	110–111
30 Aug	09:00	ASH	Morocco	1–3	Venezuela	20–25	25–20	15–25	17–25		77–95	77–95
30 Aug	11:20	ASH	Estonia	3–0	Rwanda	25–12	27–25	25–13			77–50	77–50
31 Aug	09:00	ASH	Estonia	3–0	Venezuela	25–22	25–21	25–15			75–58	75–58
31 Aug	11:00	ASH	Morocco	3–0	Rwanda	25–21	25–10	25–21			75–52	75–52

=== Final sixteen ===
Round of 16
28 August – Ankara
Iran	3
Egypt	0
28 August – İzmir
United States	1
Brazil	3
28 August – Ankara
Argentina	3
China	1
28 August – İzmir
Serbia	2
Italy	3
28 August – Ankara
India	3
Japan	0
28 August – İzmir
Russia	3
Tunisia	0
28 August – Ankara
Turkey	3
Mexico	0
28 August – İzmir
France	3
Canada	2

Quarterfinals
30 August – Ankara
Iran	0
Brazil	3
30 August – Ankara
Argentina	2
Italy	3
30 August – Ankara
India	0
Russia	3
30 August – Ankara
Turkey	0
France	3

Semifinals
31 August – Ankara
Brazil	3
Italy	1
31 August – Ankara
Russia	3
France	1

Final
1 September – Ankara
Brazil	0
Russia	3
3rd place match
1 September – Ankara
Italy	3
France	1

5th–8th semifinals
31 August – Ankara
Iran	3
Argentina	0
31 August – Ankara
India	0
Turkey	3

5th place match
1 September – Ankara
Iran	3
Turkey	1
7th place match
1 September – Ankara
Argentina	3
India	2

9th–16th quarterfinals
30 August – İzmir
Egypt	1
United States	3
30 August – İzmir
China	0
Serbia	3
30 August – İzmir
Japan	3
Tunisia	1
30 August – İzmir
Mexico	1
Canada	3

9th–12th semifinals
31 August – İzmir
United States	1
Serbia	3
31 August – İzmir
Japan	3
Canada	2

9th place match
1 September – İzmir
Serbia	3
Japan	0
11th place match
1 September – İzmir
United States	3
Canada	0

13th–16th semifinals
31 August – İzmir
Egypt	3
China	2
31 August – İzmir
Tunisia	3
Mexico	2

13th place match
1 September – İzmir
Egypt	2
Tunisia	3
15th place match
1 September – İzmir
China	3
Mexico	2

==== Round of 16 ====
Date	Time	Venue		Score		Set 1	Set 2	Set 3	Set 4	Set 5	Total	Report
28 Aug	11:00	BVH	Iran	3–0	Egypt	25–21	25–20	25–11			75–52	75–52
28 Aug	11:00	ASH	United States	1–3	Brazil	22–25	25–23	18–25	22–25		87–98	87–98
28 Aug	13:30	BVH	Argentina	3–1	China	25–19	25–23	23–25	29–27		102–94	102–94
28 Aug	13:40	ASH	Serbia	2–3	Italy	25–21	19–25	21–25	30–28	5–15	100–114	100–114
28 Aug	16:00	BVH	India	3–0	Japan	25–18	25–23	25–20			75–61	75–61
28 Aug	16:35	ASH	Russia	3–0	Tunisia	25–23	25–15	25–21			75–59	75–59
28 Aug	18:30	BVH	Turkey	3–0	Mexico	25–14	25–14	25–18			75–46	75–46
28 Aug	18:35	ASH	France	3–2	Canada	22–25	25–21	25–15	23–25	15–10	110–96	110–96

==== 9th–16th quarterfinals ====
Date	Time	Venue		Score		Set 1	Set 2	Set 3	Set 4	Set 5	Total	Report
30 Aug	13:15	ASH	Egypt	1–3	United States	25–22	21–25	23–25	20–25		89–97	89–97
30 Aug	15:50	ASH	China	0–3	Serbia	20–25	18–25	16–25			54–75	54–75
30 Aug	17:40	ASH	Japan	3–1	Tunisia	23–25	25–17	25–23	25–19		98–84	98–84
30 Aug	20:10	ASH	Mexico	1–3	Canada	23–25	25–19	13–25	18–25		79–94	79–94

==== Quarterfinals ====
Date	Time	Venue		Score		Set 1	Set 2	Set 3	Set 4	Set 5	Total	Report
30 Aug	11:00	BVH	Iran	0–3	Brazil	21–25	20–25	22–25			63–75	63–75
30 Aug	13:30	BVH	Argentina	2–3	Italy	20–25	25–23	25–20	15–25	11–15	96–108	96–108
30 Aug	16:15	BVH	India	0–3	Russia	21–25	15–25	16–25			52–75	52–75
30 Aug	19:00	BVH	Turkey	0–3	France	21–25	22–25	25–27			68–77	68–77

==== 13th–16th semifinals ====
Date	Time	Venue		Score		Set 1	Set 2	Set 3	Set 4	Set 5	Total	Report
31 Aug	13:00	ASH	Egypt	3–2	China	29–31	25–23	17–25	25–13	19–17	115–109	115–109
31 Aug	15:55	ASH	Tunisia	3–2	Mexico	23–25	25–23	22–25	25–15	21–19	116–107	116–107

==== 9th–12th semifinals ====
Date	Time	Venue		Score		Set 1	Set 2	Set 3	Set 4	Set 5	Total	Report
31 Aug	18:50	ASH	United States	1–3	Serbia	24–26	22–25	25–19	24–26		95–96	95–96
31 Aug	21:25	ASH	Japan	3–2	Canada	18–25	25–20	25–17	26–28	17–15	111–105	111–105

==== 5th–8th semifinals ====
Date	Time	Venue		Score		Set 1	Set 2	Set 3	Set 4	Set 5	Total	Report
31 Aug	11:15	BVH	Iran	3–0	Argentina	25–21	25–23	28–26			78–70	78–70
31 Aug	13:30	BVH	India	0–3	Turkey	18–25	23–25	20–25			61–75	61–75

==== Semifinals ====
Date	Time	Venue		Score		Set 1	Set 2	Set 3	Set 4	Set 5	Total	Report
31 Aug	17:00	BVH	Brazil	3–1	Italy	22–25	25–18	25–19	25–23		97–85	97–85
31 Aug	19:40	BVH	Russia	3–1	France	27–25	24–26	25–18	27–25		103–94	103–94

==== 15th place match ====
Date	Time	Venue		Score		Set 1	Set 2	Set 3	Set 4	Set 5	Total	Report
01 Sep	09:00	ASH	China	3–2	Mexico	22–25	24–26	25–19	25–20	15–9	111–99	111–99

==== 13th place match ====
Date	Time	Venue		Score		Set 1	Set 2	Set 3	Set 4	Set 5	Total	Report
01 Sep	13:35	ASH	Egypt	2–3	Tunisia	25–17	19–25	25–23	23–25	7–15	99–105	99–105

==== 11th place match ====
Date	Time	Venue		Score		Set 1	Set 2	Set 3	Set 4	Set 5	Total	Report
01 Sep	11:35	ASH	United States	3–0	Canada	25–16	25–17	25–18			75–51	75–51

==== 9th place match ====
Date	Time	Venue		Score		Set 1	Set 2	Set 3	Set 4	Set 5	Total	Report
01 Sep	16:10	ASH	Serbia	3–0	Japan	25–16	25–21	25–23			75–60	75–60

==== 7th place match ====
Date	Time	Venue		Score		Set 1	Set 2	Set 3	Set 4	Set 5	Total	Report
01 Sep	11:00	BVH	Argentina	3–2	India	22–25	23–25	26–24	25–19	15–7	111–100	111–100

==== 5th place match ====
Date	Time	Venue		Score		Set 1	Set 2	Set 3	Set 4	Set 5	Total	Report
01 Sep	13:30	BVH	Iran	3–1	Turkey	19–25	25–21	25–18	25–18		94–82	94–82

==== 3rd place match ====
Date	Time	Venue		Score		Set 1	Set 2	Set 3	Set 4	Set 5	Total	Report
01 Sep	16:00	BVH	Italy	3–1	France	25–21	25–16	20–25	28–26		98–88	98–88

==== Final ====
Date	Time	Venue		Score		Set 1	Set 2	Set 3	Set 4	Set 5	Total	Report
01 Sep	19:00	BVH	Brazil	0–3	Russia	16–25	16–25	20–25			52–75	52–75

== Final standing ==
Rank	Team
1st place, gold medalist(s)	Russia
2nd place, silver medalist(s)	Brazil
3rd place, bronze medalist(s)	Italy
4	France
5	Iran
6	Turkey
7	Argentina
8	India
9	Serbia
10	Japan
11	United States
12	Canada
13	Tunisia
14	Egypt
15	China
16	Mexico
17	Estonia
18	Morocco
19	Venezuela
20	Rwanda

2013 Men's U21 World champions

Russia
9th title

12–man roster
Alexander Goncharov, Viktor Poletaev, Ivan Demakov, Alexey Kobilev, Roman Zhos, Ilya Nikitin, Nikita Axyutin, Pavel Pankov, Ilya Petrushov, Egor Feoktistov (C), Ilyas Kurkaev, Ilya Bykovskiy
Head coach
Mikhail Nikolaev

== Awards ==
- Most valuable player
  (Russia) Victor Poletaev
- Best setter
  (Turkey) Murat Yenipazar
- Best Outside Spikers
  (Russia) Egor Feoktistov
  (France) Thibault Rossard
- Best Middle Blockers
  (Italy) Edoardo Picco
  (Russia) Ilyas Kurkaev
- Best opposite spiker
  (Brazil) Alan Souza
- Best libero
  (Turkey) Alperay Demirciler

== See also ==
- 2013 FIVB Women's Junior World Championship
