= FUNADEM Montes Claros =

Brazilian men's volleyball team

Montes Claros / FUNADEM
- Full name: Fundação de Apoio ao Desenvolvimento Educacional de Montes Claros
- Short name: Monte Claros
- Nickname: Atomic Pequi (Portuguese: Pequi Atômico)
- Founded: 2009
- Dissolved: 2012
- Ground: Trancedo Neves, Montes Claros (Capacity: 8600)
- Chairman: (Brazil) José Felipe Oliveira
- League: Superliga Brasileira de Voleibol

Uniforms
Home	Away

Fundação de Apoio ao Desenvolvimento Educacional de Montes Claros (FUNADEM) (English: Foundation for the Support and Promotion Education of Montes Claros) was a Brazilian professional men's volleyball team from Montes Claros, Minas Gerais. It was nicknamed by the press and supporters to

The team competed in the Brazilian Superleague with the names Montes Claros/FUNADEM or BMG/Montes Claros between the seasons 2009–2010 and 2011–2012. It was dissolved afterwards due to lack of sponsorship. The best result was in the team's initial season, when they were runners-up.

== Honours ==
- Brazilian Superleague
  - Runners-up: 2009–10
- Minas Gerais state championship:
  - Champions: 2009
