= Osniel Rendón =

Cuban volleyball player (born 1996)

Personal information
- Full name: Osniel Cecilio Rendón González
- Nickname: Viquila
- Nationality: Cuban
- Born: 26 October 1996 (age 30)
- Height: 205 cm (6 ft 9 in)
- Weight: 105 kg (231 lb)
- Spike: 363 cm (143 in)
- Block: 345 cm (136 in)

Volleyball information
- Position: Opposite
- Number: 6 (national team)

Career
| Years | Teams |
|---|---|
| 2022- | Montes Claros/América Volei |

National team
| 2014-2017 | Cuba |

Osniel Cecilio Rendón González (born 26 October 1996) is a Cuban volleyball player. He was part of the Cuba men's national volleyball team from 2014 to 2017. On club level he plays for Montes Claros/América Volei.
