= 2016 Men's U23 South American Volleyball Championship =

Tournament details
- Host country: Colombia
- Dates: 21–25 June
- Teams: 6
- Venue: 1

Final positions
- Champions: Brazil (2nd title)

The 2016 Men's U23 South American Volleyball Championship was the second edition of the tournament, organised by South America's governing volleyball body, the Confederación Sudamericana de Voleibol (CSV).

== Preliminary round ==
=== Pool A ===
Pos	Team	Pld	W	L	Pts	SW	SL	SR	SPW	SPL	SPR	Qualification
1	Argentina	2	2	0	6	6	1	6.000	173	120	1.442	Semifinals
2	Colombia	2	1	1	3	4	3	1.333	155	145	1.069	Semifinals
3	Ecuador	2	0	2	0	0	6	0.000	87	150	0.580	5th-place match

Date	Time		Score		Set 1	Set 2	Set 3	Set 4	Set 5	Total	Report
21 Jun	20:00	Colombia	3–0	Ecuador	25–12	25–17	25–18			75–47	Result
22 Jun	17:00	Argentina	3–0	Ecuador	25–10	25–18	25–12			75–40	Result
23 Jun	19:00	Colombia	1–3	Argentina	14–25	23–25	25–23	18–25		80–98	Result

=== Pool B ===
Pos	Team	Pld	W	L	Pts	SW	SL	SR	SPW	SPL	SPR	Qualification
1	Brazil	2	2	0	6	6	0	MAX	150	82	1.829	Semifinals
2	Chile	2	1	1	3	3	4	0.750	141	147	0.959	Semifinals
3	Peru	2	0	2	0	1	6	0.167	110	172	0.640	5th-place match

Date	Time		Score		Set 1	Set 2	Set 3	Set 4	Set 5	Total	Report
21 Jun	17:00	Chile	3–1	Peru	25–12	25–20	22–25	25–15		97–72	Result
22 Jun	19:00	Peru	0–3	Brazil	14–25	11–25	13–25			38–75	Result
23 Jun	17:00	Brazil	3–0	Chile	25–19	25–15	25–10			75–44	Result

== Final round ==
=== 5th–6th place ===
Date	Time		Score		Set 1	Set 2	Set 3	Set 4	Set 5	Total	Report
24 Jun	15:00	Peru	3–0	Ecuador	25–17	25–16	25–18			75–51	Result

=== Final four ===
Semifinal
24 June
Argentina	3
Chile	0
24 June
Brazil	3
Colombia	1

Final
25 June
Argentina	0
Brazil	3
3rd place match
25 June
Chile	2
Colombia	3

==== Semifinals ====
Date	Time		Score		Set 1	Set 2	Set 3	Set 4	Set 5	Total	Report
24 Jun	17:00	Argentina	3–0	Chile	25–22	25–17	25–22			75–61	Result
24 Jun	19:00	Brazil	3–1	Colombia	18–25	25–17	25–18	25–16		93–76	Result

==== 3rd place match ====
Date	Time		Score		Set 1	Set 2	Set 3	Set 4	Set 5	Total	Report
25 Jun	17:00	Chile	2–3	Colombia	26–24	21–25	25–21	21–25	13–15	106–110	Result

==== Final ====
Date	Time		Score		Set 1	Set 2	Set 3	Set 4	Set 5	Total	Report
16 Jul	15:00	Argentina	0–3	Brazil	21–25	24–26	26–28			71–79	Result

== Final standing ==
Rank	Team
1st place, gold medalist(s)	Brazil
2nd place, silver medalist(s)	Argentina
3rd place, bronze medalist(s)	Colombia
4	Chile
5	Peru
6	Ecuador

Qualified for the 2017 Men's U23 World Championship

2016 Men's U23 South American Volleyball Championship

Brazil
2nd title

== All-Star Team ==
- Most valuable player
  - Caio Oliveira (BRA)
- Best setter
  - Fernando Kreling (BRA)
- Best opposite spiker
  - German Johansen (ARG)
- Best outside spikers
  - Nicolás Lazo (ARG)
  - Rodrigo Leão (BRA)
- Best middle blockers
  - Gastón Fernández (ARG)
  - Rômulo Silva (BRA)
- Best libero
  - Santiago Danani (ARG)

== See also ==
- 2016 Women's U23 South American Volleyball Championship
