= Men's U23 South American Volleyball Championship =

International volleyball competition

- Sport: Volleyball
- Founded: 2014
- No. of teams: 6
- Continent: South America (CSV)
- Most recent champion: Brazil (2nd title)
- Most titles: Brazil (2 titles)

The Men's U23 South American Volleyball Championship is a sport competition for national volleyball teams with players under 23 years, currently held biannually and organized by the Confederación Sudamericana de Voleibol (CSV), the South American volleyball federation.

== Results summary ==
Year	Host	Final			3rd place match			Teams
Year	Host	Champions	Score	Runners-up	3rd place	Score	4th place	Teams
2014; Details	(Brazil); Saquarema	Brazil	Round-robin	Argentina	Chile	Round-robin	Colombia	6
2016; Details	(Colombia); Cartagena	Brazil	3–0	Argentina	Colombia	3–2	Chile	6

== Medals summary ==
Rank	Nation	Gold	Silver	Bronze	Total
1	Brazil	2	0	0	2
2	Argentina	0	2	0	2
3	Chile	0	0	1	1
3	Colombia	0	0	1	1
Totals (4 entries)		2	2	2	6

== Most valuable player by edition ==
- 2014 – Douglas Souza (BRA)
- 2016 – Caio Oliveira (BRA)

== See also ==
- Women's U22 South American Volleyball Championship
- Men's Junior South American Volleyball Championship
- Boys' Youth South American Volleyball Championship
- Boys' U17 South American Volleyball Championship
