= Cuba men's national under-23 volleyball team =

Youth volleyball team representing Cuba

Cuba
- Association: Cuban Volleyball Federation
- Confederation: NORCECA

Uniforms
Home	Away	Third

FIVB U23 World Championship
- Appearances: 2 (First in 2015)
- Best result: (bronze) Bronze : (2017)

U23 Pan American Cup
- Appearances: 2 (First in 2014)
- Best result: (gold) Champions : (2014).

The Cuba men's national under-23 volleyball team represents Cuba in men's under-23 volleyball events, it is controlled and managed by the Cuban Volleyball Federation that is a member of North American volleyball body North, Central America and Caribbean Volleyball Confederation (NORCECA) and the international volleyball body government the Fédération Internationale de Volleyball (FIVB).

== Results ==
=== FIVB U23 World Championship ===
Champions Runners up Third place Fourth place

FIVB U23 World Championship
Year	Round	Position	Pld	W	L	SW	SL	Squad
(Brazil) 2013	Didn't qualify							
(United Arab Emirates) 2015		4th place						Squad
(Egypt) 2017		Third place						Squad
Total	0 Titles	2/3						

=== U23 Pan American Cup ===
Champions Runners up Third place Fourth place

U23 Pan American Cup
Year	Round	Position	Pld	W	L	SW	SL	Squad
(Canada) 2012	Didn't enter							
(Cuba) 2014	Final	Champions						Squad
(Mexico) 2016	Final	Runners-Up						Squad
Total	1 Title	2/3						

== Team ==
=== Current squad ===
The following is the Cuban roster in the 2017 FIVB Men's U23 World Championship.

Head coach: Nicolas Vives

No.	Name	Date of birth	Height	Weight	Spike	Block	2017 club
1	José Israel Masso Alvarez	2 December 1997	1.99 m (6 ft 6 in)	79 kg (174 lb)	349 cm (137 in)	347 cm (137 in)	(Cuba) Guantanamo
2	Osniel Melgarejo	18 December 1997	1.95 m (6 ft 5 in)	83 kg (183 lb)	345 cm (136 in)	320 cm (130 in)	(Cuba) Santic Spiritus
3	Marlon Yang Herrera	23 May 2001	2.02 m (6 ft 8 in)	75 kg (165 lb)	345 cm (136 in)	320 cm (130 in)	(Cuba) Villa Clara
5	Javier Concepcion Rojas	27 December 1997	2.00 m (6 ft 7 in)	84 kg (185 lb)	356 cm (140 in)	350 cm (140 in)	(Cuba) La Habana
6	Alfredo Zequeira Cairo	28 June 1996	1.95 m (6 ft 5 in)	78 kg (172 lb)	352 cm (139 in)	347 cm (137 in)	(Cuba) Villa Clara
10	Miguel Gutierrez Suarez	21 February 1997	1.87 m (6 ft 2 in)	86 kg (190 lb)	355 cm (140 in)	340 cm (130 in)	(Cuba) Villa Clara
11	Livan Taboada Diaz	4 October 1998	1.91 m (6 ft 3 in)	75 kg (165 lb)	343 cm (135 in)	327 cm (129 in)	(Cuba) La Habana
12	Raciel Herrera Cabrera	2 July 1998	1.98 m (6 ft 6 in)	85 kg (187 lb)	345 cm (136 in)	325 cm (128 in)	(Cuba) Pinar del Río
14	Adrián Goide (C)	26 June 1998	1.91 m (6 ft 3 in)	80 kg (180 lb)	344 cm (135 in)	340 cm (130 in)	(Cuba) Sancti Spiritus
17	Roamy Alonso Arce	24 July 1997	2.01 m (6 ft 7 in)	93 kg (205 lb)	350 cm (140 in)	330 cm (130 in)	(Cuba) Matanzas
18	Miguel Ángel López Castro	25 March 1997	1.89 m (6 ft 2 in)	75 kg (165 lb)	345 cm (136 in)	320 cm (130 in)	(Cuba) Cienfuegos
19	Lionnis Salazar	25 July 1997	1.85 m (6 ft 1 in)	77 kg (170 lb)	332 cm (131 in)	332 cm (131 in)	Santiago de Cuba
20	Christien Kuhn	28 July 1997	1.87 m (6 ft 2 in)	78 kg (170 lb)	330 cm (130 in)	332 cm (131 in)	(Cuba) Cienfuegos
