= 2012 Men's Junior South American Volleyball Championship =

Tournament details
- Host country: Brazil
- Dates: 23 – 27 October
- Teams: 7
- Venue: 1 (in Saquarema host cities)

Final positions
- Champions: Brazil (17th title)

Tournament awards
- MVP: João Ferreira (BRA)

The 2012 Men's Junior South American Volleyball Championship was the 21st edition of the tournament, organised by South America's governing volleyball body, the Confederación Sudamericana de Voleibol (CSV). It was determined September, 2012 that Saquarema, Brazil would be the host after Cali, Colombia withdrew. The top three teams will qualify for the 2013 Junior World Championship.

== Competing nations ==
The following national teams will participate in the tournament, teams were seeded according to how they finished in the previous edition of the tournament:

Pool A	Pool B
Brazil (1st); Chile (4th); Colombia (5th)	Argentina (2nd); Venezuela (3rd); Uruguay (6th); Peru (7th)

== First round ==
- All times are Brazilian Daylight Saving Time (UTC−02:00)

=== Pool A ===
Pos	Team	Pld	W	L	Pts	SPW	SPL	SPR	SW	SL	SR	Qualification
1	Brazil	2	2	0	6	150	95	1.579	6	0	MAX	Semifinals
2	Chile	2	1	1	2	159	178	0.893	3	5	0.600	Semifinals
3	Colombia	2	0	2	1	145	181	0.801	2	6	0.333	

Date	Time		Score		Set 1	Set 2	Set 3	Set 4	Set 5	Total	Report
23 Oct	14:30	Chile	3–2	Colombia	25–19	25–20	25–27	16–25	15–12	106–103	P2P3
24 Oct	16:30	Brazil	3–0	Colombia	25–16	25–13	25–13			75–42	P2P3
25 Oct	16:30	Brazil	3–0	Chile	25–15	25–16	25–22			75–53	P2P3

=== Pool B ===
Pos	Team	Pld	W	L	Pts	SPW	SPL	SPR	SW	SL	SR	Qualification
1	Argentina	3	3	0	9	225	153	1.471	9	0	MAX	Semifinals
2	Venezuela	3	2	1	6	230	206	1.117	6	4	1.500	Semifinals
3	Peru	3	1	2	3	182	207	0.879	3	6	0.500	
4	Uruguay	3	0	3	0	176	247	0.713	1	9	0.111	

Date	Time		Score		Set 1	Set 2	Set 3	Set 4	Set 5	Total	Report
23 Oct	16:30	Peru	0–3	Argentina	15–25	15–25	19–25			49–75	P2P3
23 Oct	19:00	Venezuela	3–1	Uruguay	22–25	25–15	25–17	25–16		97–73	P2P3
24 Oct	14:30	Venezuela	3–0	Peru	27–25	25–11	25–22			77–58	P2P3
24 Oct	19:00	Argentina	3–0	Uruguay	25–17	25–15	25–16			75–48	P2P3
25 Oct	14:30	Argentina	3–0	Venezuela	25–14	25–21	25–21			75–56	P2P3
25 Oct	19:00	Uruguay	0–3	Peru	23–25	17–25	15–25			55–75	P2P3

== Final round ==
=== 5th to 8th places bracket ===
5th to 8th Classification
2012-10-26 – Saquarema
Peru
bye
2012-10-26 – Saquarema
Colombia	3
Uruguay	1

5th place match
2012-10-27 – Saquarema
Peru	2
Colombia	3

=== Championship bracket ===
Semifinals
2012-10-26 – Saquarema
Brazil	3
Venezuela	0
2012-10-26 – Saquarema
Argentina	3
Chile	0

Final
2012-10-27 – Saquarema
Brazil	3
Argentina	0
Third place
2012-10-27 – Saquarema
Venezuela	3
Chile	0

=== Classification 5th to 7th ===
Date	Time		Score		Set 1	Set 2	Set 3	Set 4	Set 5	Total	Report
26 Oct	11:00	Colombia	3–1	Uruguay	25–18	18–25	25–15	25–21		93–79	P2P3

=== Semifinals ===
Date	Time		Score		Set 1	Set 2	Set 3	Set 4	Set 5	Total	Report
26 Oct	14:30	Argentina	3–0	Chile	25–13	25–23	25–22			75–58	P2P3
26 Oct	16:30	Brazil	3–0	Venezuela	25–21	25–19	25–19			75–59	P2P3

=== 5th place match ===
Date	Time		Score		Set 1	Set 2	Set 3	Set 4	Set 5	Total	Report
27 Oct	11:00	Peru	2–3	Colombia	18–25	18–25	25–23	25–20	12–15	98–108	P2P3

=== 3rd place match ===
Date	Time		Score		Set 1	Set 2	Set 3	Set 4	Set 5	Total	Report
27 Oct	14:30	Venezuela	3–0	Chile	25–21	25–12	25–20			75–53	P2P3

=== Final ===
Date	Time		Score		Set 1	Set 2	Set 3	Set 4	Set 5	Total	Report
27 Oct	16:30	Brazil	3–0	Argentina	25–14	25–17	25–17			75–48	P2P3

== Final standing ==
Rank	Team
1st place, gold medalist(s)	Brazil
2nd place, silver medalist(s)	Argentina
3rd place, bronze medalist(s)	Venezuela
4	Chile
5	Colombia
6	Peru
7	Uruguay

Qualified for the 2013 Junior World Championship

2012 Men's Junior South American champions

Brazil
17th title

== Individual awards ==
- Most valuable player
  - João Ferreira (BRA)
- Best spiker
  - Fabián Martínez (VEN)
- Best blocker
  - Leandro Santos (BRA)
- Best server
  - João Ferreira (BRA)
- Best digger
  - Juan Díaz (COL)
- Best setter
  - Thiago Veloso (BRA)
- Best receiver
  - Luciano Zornetta (ARG)
- Best libero
  - Martín Weber (ARG)
