= 2014 Men's U23 Pan-American Volleyball Cup =

Tournament details
- Host country: Cuba
- Dates: October 5 – 10, 2014
- Teams: 6
- Venue: 1 (in Havana host cities)

Final positions
- Champions: Cuba (1st title)

Tournament awards
- MVP: Osniel Rendón (CUB)

The 2014 Men's U23 Pan-American Volleyball Cup was the second edition of the bi-annual men's volleyball tournament, played by six countries from October 5 – 10, 2014 in Havana, Cuba.

== Competing nations ==
Teams

Cuba
Dominican Republic
El Salvador
Guatemala
Mexico
Trinidad and Tobago

== Competition format ==
The competition format for the Men's U23 Pan-American Volleyball Cup consists of two phases, the first is a Round-Robin round between all six competing nations. After the Round-Robin finishes, 3rd and 4th place nations according to ranking will play for the bronze and 1st and 2nd place nations according to ranking will play for the gold.

=== Pool standing procedure ===
Match won 3–0: 5 points for the winner, 0 point for the loser
Match won 3–1: 4 points for the winner, 1 points for the loser
Match won 3–2: 3 points for the winner, 2 points for the loser
In case of tie, the teams were classified according to the following criteria:
points ratio and sets ratio

== Preliminary round ==
- All times are in Cuba Daylight Time (UTC−04:00)

=== Group A ===
Pos	Team	Pld	W	L	Pts	SPW	SPL	SPR	SW	SL	SR	Qualification
1	Cuba	5	5	0	25	375	232	1.616	15	0	MAX	Final
2	Mexico	5	4	1	17	413	365	1.132	12	6	2.000	Final
3	Dominican Republic	5	3	2	16	415	358	1.159	11	7	1.571	Bronze medal match
4	Guatemala	5	2	3	10	397	424	0.936	8	11	0.727	Bronze medal match
5	Trinidad and Tobago	5	1	4	6	292	389	0.751	4	12	0.333	
6	El Salvador	5	0	5	1	266	390	0.682	1	15	0.067	

Date	Time		Score		Set 1	Set 2	Set 3	Set 4	Set 5	Total	Report
5 Oct	15:00	Guatemala	1–3	Mexico	25–23	23–25	20–25	17–25		85–98	P2 P3
5 Oct	17:00	El Salvador	0–3	Dominican Republic	15–25	12–25	13–25			40–75	P2 P3
5 Oct	19:00	Cuba	3–0	Trinidad and Tobago	25–14	25–12	25–10			75–36	P2 P3
6 Oct	15:00	Trinidad and Tobago	0–3	Dominican Republic	12–25	25–27	14–25			51–77	P2 P3
6 Oct	17:00	El Salvador	0–3	Mexico	18–25	9–25	12–25			39–75	P2 P3
6 Oct	19:00	Cuba	3–0	Guatemala	25–15	25–15	25–17			75–47	P2 P3
7 Oct	15:00	Guatemala	3–1	Trinidad and Tobago	25–18	23–25	25–21	25–16		98–80	P2 P3
7 Oct	17:00	Dominican Republic	2–3	Mexico	25–27	31–29	25–19	22–25	13–15	116–115	P2 P3
7 Oct	19:00	Cuba	3–0	El Salvador	25–15	25–17	25–13			75–45	P2 P3
8 Oct	15:00	Mexico	3–0	Trinidad and Tobago	25–16	25–17	25–17			75–50	P2 P3
8 Oct	17:00	El Salvador	1–3	Guatemala	25–15	16–25	20–25	17–25		78–90	P2 P3
8 Oct	19:00	Cuba	3–0	Dominican Republic	25–19	25–13	25–22			75–54	P2 P3
9 Oct	15:00	El Salvador	0–3	Trinidad and Tobago	23–25	23–25	18–25			64–75	P2 P3
9 Oct	17:00	Dominican Republic	3–1	Guatemala	18–25	25–16	25–20	25–16		93–77	P2 P3
9 Oct	19:00	Cuba	3–0	Mexico	25–18	25–17	25–15			75–50	P2 P3

== Final round ==
=== Fifth place match ===
Date	Time		Score		Set 1	Set 2	Set 3	Set 4	Set 5	Total	Report
10 Oct	15:00	Trinidad and Tobago	3–1	El Salvador	25–19	25–20	22–25	25–16		97–80	P2 P3

=== Bronze medal match ===
Date	Time		Score		Set 1	Set 2	Set 3	Set 4	Set 5	Total	Report
10 Oct	17:00	Dominican Republic	3–0	Guatemala	25–18	25–20	25–15			75–53	P2 P3

=== Final ===
Date	Time		Score		Set 1	Set 2	Set 3	Set 4	Set 5	Total	Report
10 Oct	19:00	Cuba	3–0	Mexico	25–23	25–14	25–23			75–60	P2 P3

== Final standing ==
Rank	Team
1st place, gold medalist(s)	Cuba
2nd place, silver medalist(s)	Mexico
3rd place, bronze medalist(s)	Dominican Republic
4	Guatemala
5	Trinidad and Tobago
6	El Salvador

2014 Men's U23 Pan-American Cup champions

Cuba
1st title

== Individual awards ==
- Most valuable player
  - Osniel Rendón (CUB)
- Best scorer
  - Luis Adames (DOM)
- Best setter
  - Ricardo Calvo (CUB)
- Best Opposite
  - Alexis Garay (MEX)
- Best outside hitters
  - Luis Adames (DOM)
  - Lázaro Fundora (CUB)
- Best middle blockers
  - Liván Osoria (CUB)
  - Mario Frías (DOM)
- Best server
  - Osniel Rendón (CUB)
- Best digger
  - Enger Mieses (DOM)
- Best receiver
  - Yonder García (CUB)
- Best libero
  - Enger Mieses (DOM)
