= 2014 Men's U23 South American Volleyball Championship =

Tournament details
- Host country: Brazil
- Dates: 08-12 October
- Teams: 6
- Venue: 1 (in Saquarema host cities)

Final positions
- Champions: Brazil (1st title)

Tournament awards
- MVP: Douglas Souza (BRA)

The 2014 Men's U23 South American Volleyball Championship was the 1st edition of the tournament, organised by South America's governing volleyball body, the Confederación Sudamericana de Voleibol (CSV).

== Competing nations ==
Pool A

Argentina
Brazil
Chile
Colombia
Paraguay
Uruguay

== Competition format ==
The 2014 Men's U23 South American Volleyball Championship will consist in a single Round-Robin pool between the six teams, the champion will be determined from the ranking after the round.

== Competition ==
Pos	Team	Pld	W	L	Pts	SW	SL	SR	SPW	SPL	SPR
1	Brazil	5	5	0	15	15	1	15.000	378	235	1.609
2	Argentina	5	4	1	12	12	3	4.000	347	288	1.205
3	Chile	5	3	2	9	10	7	1.429	362	344	1.052
4	Colombia	5	2	3	6	7	9	0.778	338	335	1.009
5	Uruguay	5	1	4	3	3	12	0.250	274	353	0.776
6	Paraguay	5	0	5	0	0	15	0.000	216	375	0.576

Date	Time		Score		Set 1	Set 2	Set 3	Set 4	Set 5	Total
08 Oct	15:00	Argentina	3–0	Paraguay	25-18	25-13	25-15			75-46
08 Oct	17:00	Brazil	3–0	Uruguay	25-15	25-13	25-20			75-48
08 Oct	19:00	Colombia	1–3	Chile	20-25	25-14	22-25	20-25		87-89
09 Oct	15:00	Uruguay	3–0	Paraguay	25-20	25-10	25-18			75-48
09 Oct	17:00	Brazil	3–1	Chile	23-25	25-18	25-10	25-12		98-65
09 Oct	19:00	Argentina	3–0	Colombia	25-15	25-21	25-19			75-55
10 Oct	15:00	Chile	3–0	Paraguay	25-13	25-13	25-9			75-35
10 Oct	17:00	Colombia	0–3	Brazil	17-25	11-25	15-25			43-75
10 Oct	19:00	Uruguay	0–3	Argentina	16-25	19-25	19-25			54-75
11 Oct	15:00	Colombia	3–0	Uruguay	25–10	28–26	25–11			78–47
11 Oct	17:00	Argentina	3–0	Chile	25–18	26–24	25–16			76–58
11 Oct	19:00	Paraguay	0–3	Brazil	10–25	8–25	15–25			33–75
12 Oct	14:00	Chile	3–0	Uruguay	25-14	25-23	25-11			75-48
12 Oct	16:00	Paraguay	0–3	Colombia	16–25	16–25	17–25			49–75
12 Oct	18:00	Brazil	3–0	Argentina	25–15	25–18	25–13			75–46

== Final standing ==
Rank	Team
1st place, gold medalist(s)	Brazil
2nd place, silver medalist(s)	Argentina
3rd place, bronze medalist(s)	Chile
4	Colombia
5	Uruguay
6	Paraguay

2014 Men's U23 South American Volleyball Championship

Brazil
1st title

Qualified for the 2015 Men's U23 World Championship

== All-Star Team ==
- Most valuable player
  - Douglas Souza (BRA)
- Best setter
  - Thiago Veloso (BRA)
- Best Opposite
  - Pablo Koukartsev (ARG)
- Best Outside Hitters
  - Gonzalo Quiroga (ARG)
  - Dusan Bonacic (CHI)
- Best Middle Blockers
  - Flávio Gualberto (BRA)
  - Renzo Mendoza (COL)
- Best libero
  - Rogerio Carvalho (BRA)
