= 2012 Men's U23 Pan-American Volleyball Cup =

Volleyball tournament

Tournament details
- Host country: Canada
- Dates: September 25 – 30, 2012
- Teams: 5
- Venue: 1 (in 1 host city)

Final positions
- Champions: Brazil (1st title)

Tournament awards
- MVP: Rogério Carvalho (BRA)

The 2012 Men's U23 Pan-American Volleyball Cup was the first edition of the bi-annual men's volleyball tournament, played by five countries from September 25 – 30, 2012 at the Langley Events Centre in Langley, British Columbia, Canada.

== Competing nations ==
Teams

Argentina
Brazil
Canada
Dominican Republic
Mexico
Venezuela (withdrew)

== Pool standing procedure ==
Match won 3–0: 5 points for the winner, 0 point for the loser
Match won 3–1: 4 points for the winner, 1 points for the loser
Match won 3–2: 3 points for the winner, 2 points for the loser
The first criterion is the number of matches won, second criterion is points gained by the team
In case of tie, the teams were classified according to the following criteria:
points ratio and sets ratio

== Competition format ==
The competition format for the first Men's U23 Pan-American Volleyball Cup consists of two phases, the first is a Round-Robin round between all five competing nations. After the Round-Robin finishes, 3rd and 4th place nations according to ranking will play for the bronze and 1st and 2nd place nations according to ranking will play for the gold.

== Round robin ==
- Venue: Langley Events Centre, Langley, British Columbia, Canada
- All times are Pacific Standard Time Zone (UTC−08:00)

Pos	Team	Pld	W	L	Pts	SPW	SPL	SPR	SW	SL	SR	Qualification
1	Brazil	4	4	0	18	342	258	1.326	12	2	6.000	Final
2	Argentina	4	3	1	14	315	272	1.158	9	4	2.250	Final
3	Canada	4	2	2	8	259	350	0.740	6	8	0.750	3rd place match
4	Dominican Republic	4	1	3	6	275	307	0.896	4	9	0.444	3rd place match
5	Mexico	4	0	4	2	240	335	0.716	2	12	0.167	

Date	Time		Score		Set 1	Set 2	Set 3	Set 4	Set 5	Total	Report
25 Sep	18:00	Dominican Republic	1–3	Argentina	15–25	25–22	22–25	17–25		79–97	P2P3
25 Sep	20:00	Canada	3–2	Mexico	20–25	24–26	25–18	25–13	15–13	109–95	P2P3
26 Sep	18:00	Argentina	3–0	Mexico	25–16	25–23	25–11			75–50	P2P3
26 Sep	20:00	Brazil	3–0	Dominican Republic	25–20	25–20	25–13			75–53	P2P3
27 Sep	18:00	Brazil	3–0	Argentina	25–20	31–29	25–18			81–67	P2P3
27 Sep	20:00	Canada	3–0	Dominican Republic	25–18	27–25	27–25			79–68	P2P3
28 Sep	18:00	Mexico	0–3	Dominican Republic	19–25	19–25	18–25			56–75	P2P3
28 Sep	20:00	Canada	2–3	Brazil	19–25	15–25	25–21	26–24	14–16	99–111	P2P3
29 Sep	18:00	Brazil	3–0	Mexico	25–10	25–16	25–13			75–39	P2P3
29 Sep	20:00	Canada	0–3	Argentina	24–26	15–25	23–25			62–76	P2P3

== Finals ==
=== 3rd place match ===
Date	Time		Score		Set 1	Set 2	Set 3	Set 4	Set 5	Total	Report
30 Sep	18:00	Canada	0–3	Dominican Republic	23–25	15–25	23–25			61–75	P2P3

=== Final ===
Date	Time		Score		Set 1	Set 2	Set 3	Set 4	Set 5	Total	Report
30 Sep	20:00	Brazil	3–0	Argentina	25–18	25–13	25–18			75–49	P2P3

== Final standing ==
Rank	Team
1st place, gold medalist(s)	Brazil
2nd place, silver medalist(s)	Argentina
3rd place, bronze medalist(s)	Dominican Republic
4	Canada
5	Mexico

2012 Men's U23 Pan-American Cup champions

Brazil
1st title

== Individual awards ==
- Most valuable player
  - Rogério Carvalho (BRA)
- Best scorer
  - Gonzalo Lapera (ARG)
- Best spiker
  - Henrique Batagim (BRA)
- Best blocker
  - Daniel Jansen (CAN)
- Best server
  - Gonzalo Lapera (ARG)
- Best digger
  - Rogério Carvalho (BRA)
- Best setter
  - Fernando Arpajou (ARG)
- Best receiver
  - Rogério Carvalho (BRA)
- Best libero
  - Rogério Carvalho (BRA)
