= Tunisia men's national under-21 volleyball team =

Tunisia U21
- Nickname(s): نسور قرطاج (Eagles of Carthage)
- Association: Tunisian Volleyball Federation
- Confederation: CAVB

Uniforms
Home	Away	Third

FIVB U21 World Championship
- Appearances: 14 (First in 1985)
- Best result: 5th : (1993)

African U21 / U20 Championship
- Appearances: 18 (First in 1984)
- Best result: Champions (gold) (11): 1984, 1990, 1992, 1996, 1998, 2000, 2008, 2010, 2013, 2018, 2024
- www.ftvb.org

Tunisia men's national under-21 volleyball team
Medal record

African Championship
Gold medal – first place	1984 Cairo	Team
Gold medal – first place	1990 Tunis	Team
Gold medal – first place	1992 Cairo / Tunis	Team
Gold medal – first place	1996 Sidi Bou Said	Team
Gold medal – first place	1998 Johannesburg	Team
Gold medal – first place	2000 Kélibia	Team
Gold medal – first place	2008 Sidi Bou Said	Team
Gold medal – first place	2010 Misrata	Team
Gold medal – first place	2013 Sidi Bou Said	Team
Gold medal – first place	2018 Abuja	Team
Gold medal – first place	2024 Tunis	Team
Silver medal – second place	1994 Tunis	Team
Silver medal – second place	2002 Cairo	Team
Silver medal – second place	2004 Nairobi	Team
Silver medal – second place	2006 Casablanca	Team
Silver medal – second place	2022 Radès	Team
Silver medal – second place	2025 Cairo	Team
Bronze medal – third place	1986 Sétif	Team

Arab Championship
Gold medal – first place	1989 Cairo	Team

The Tunisia men's national under-21 volleyball team (Arabic: منتخب تونس تحت 21 سنة لكرة الطائرة), nicknamed Les Aigles de Carthage (The Eagles of Carthage or The Carthage Eagles), represents Tunisia in international volleyball competitions and friendly matches. The team is one of the leading nations in men's volleyball on the African continent, with ten-time African Championship.

== Results ==
Champions Runners up Third place Fourth place

- Red border color indicates tournament was held on home soil.

=== FIVB U21 World Championship ===
FIVB U21 World Championship
Year	Round	Position	Pld	W	L	SW	SL
(Brazil) 1977	Did not compete						
(United States) 1981	Did not compete						
(Italy) 1985		15th					
(Bahrain) 1987	Did not compete						
(Greece) 1989	Did not compete						
(Egypt) 1991		13th					
(Argentina) 1993		5th					
(Malaysia) 1995	Did not compete						
(Bahrain) 1997		13th					
(Thailand) 1999		9th					
(Poland) 2001		13th					
(Iran) 2003		13th					
(India) 2005		13th					
(Morocco) 2007	Did not compete						
(India) 2009		14th					
(Brazil) 2011		14th					
(Turkey) 2013		13th					
(Mexico) 2015	Did not compete						
(Czech Republic) 2017	Did not compete						
(Bahrain) 2019		14th					
(Italy) (Bulgaria) 2021	Did not compete						
(Bahrain) 2023		16th					
(China) 2025		24th					
Total	0 Titles	14/23					

=== African U21 / U20 Championship ===
African U21 Championship
Year	Round	Position	Pld	W	L	SW	SL
(Egypt) 1984	Final	1st					
(Algeria) 1986	Semi-final	3rd					
(Mauritius) 1988	Did not compete						
(Tunisia) 1990	Final	1st					
(Tunisia) (Egypt) 1992	Final	1st					
(Tunisia) 1994	Final	2nd					
(Tunisia) 1996	Final	1st					
(South Africa) 1998	Final	1st					
(Tunisia) 2000	Final	1st					
(Egypt) 2002	Final	2nd					
(Kenya) 2004	Final	2nd					
(Morocco) 2006	Final	2nd					
(Tunisia) 2008	Final	1st					
(Libya) 2010	Final	1st					
(Tunisia) 2013	Final	1st					
(Egypt) 2015	Did not compete						
(Morocco) 2016	Did not compete						
(Nigeria) 2018	Final	1st					
(Egypt) 2020	Did not compete						
(Tunisia) 2022	Final	2nd					
(Tunisia) 2024	Final	1st					
(Egypt) 2025	Final	2nd					
Total	11 Titles	18/21					

=== Arab Junior Volleyball Championship ===
Arab Junior Volleyball Championship
Year	Round	Position	Pld	W	L	SW	SL
(Egypt) 1989	Final	1st					
Total	1 Title	?/?					

== See also ==
- Tunisia men's national volleyball team
- Tunisia men's national under-23 volleyball team
- Tunisia men's national under-19 volleyball team
- Tunisia women's national volleyball team
- Tunisian Volleyball Federation
