= Egypt men's national under-21 volleyball team =

Youth volleyball team representing Egypt

Egypt U21
- Nickname(s): The Pharaohs
- Association: Egyptian Volleyball Federation
- Confederation: CAVB

Uniforms
Home	Away	Third

FIVB U21 World Championship
- Appearances: 16 (First in 1981)
- Best result: 9th (2003, 2023)

African U21 / U20 Championship
- Appearances: 18 (First in 1984)
- Best result: (gold) (2002, 2006, 2015, 2016, 2020, 2022, 2025)
- www.fevb.org (in Arabic)

The Egypt men's national under-21 volleyball team, represents Egypt in international volleyball competitions and friendly matches. The team is six-time African Champion.

== Results ==
Champions Runners up Third place Fourth place

=== FIVB U21 World Championship ===
FIVB U21 World Championship
Year	Round	Position	Pld	W	L	SW	SL	Squad
(Brazil) 1977	Did not enter							
(United States) 1981	—N/a	15th place	—N/a					Squad
(Italy) 1985	—N/a	16th place	—N/a					Squad
(Bahrain) 1987	—N/a	13th place	—N/a					Squad
(Greece) 1989	Did not qualify							
(Egypt) 1991	—N/a	12th place	—N/a					Squad
(Argentina) 1993	Did not qualify							
(Malaysia) 1995	Did not qualify							
(Bahrain) 1997	Did not qualify							
(Thailand) 1999	Did not qualify							
(Poland) 2001	Did not qualify							
(Iran) 2003	Second round	9th place	4	1	3	4	11	Squad
(India) 2005	Did not qualify							
(Morocco) 2007	9th place match	10th place	7	2	5	9	17	Squad
(India) 2009	13th place match	13th place	8	2	6	10	22	Squad
(Brazil) 2011	15th place match	15th place	8	2	6	11	20	Squad
(Turkey) 2013	13th place match	14th place	8	2	6	12	22	Squad
(Mexico) 2015	15th place match	15th place	8	1	7	8	21	Squad
(Czech Republic) 2017	11th place match	12th place	8	2	6	11	19	Squad
(Bahrain) 2019	13th place match	13th place	8	4	4	16	17	Squad
(Italy) (Bulgaria) 2021	13th place match	13th place	8	3	5	12	18	Squad
(Bahrain) 2023	9th place match	9th place	8	5	3	16	14	Squad
(China) 2025	13th place match	13th place	9	6	3	22	16	Squad
Total	0 Title	16/24	—N/a					

=== African Championship ===
Year	Position
(Egypt) 1984	Runners-up
(Algeria) 1986	Runners-up
(Mauritius) 1988	No data
(Tunisia) 1990	No data
(Tunisia) / (Egypt) 1992	Runners-up
(Tunisia) 1994	No data
(Tunisia) 1996	Third place
(South Africa) 1998	No data
(Tunisia) 2000	Runners-up
(Egypt) 2002	Champions
(Kenya) 2004	Third place
(Morocco) 2006	Champions
(Tunisia) 2008	Runners-up
(Libya) 2010	Runners-up
(Tunisia) 2013	Runners-up
(Egypt) 2015	Champions
(Morocco) 2016	Champions
(Nigeria) 2018	Runners-up
(Egypt) 2020	Champions
(Tunisia) 2022	Champions
(Tunisia) 2024	Runners-up
(Egypt) 2025	Champions
Total	??/23

== Team ==
=== Current squad ===
The following is the Egyptian roster in the 2025 FIVB Volleyball Men's U21 World Championship.

A 12-player squad was announced on 19 August 2025.

Head coach: (Egypt) Ahmed Samir Eldardiri

No.	Name	Pos.	Date of birth	Height	2025 club
2	Salah Ibrahim	OP	26 September 2005	1.96 m (6 ft 5 in)	
3	Youssef Elrassas	MB	5 April 2006	2.06 m (6 ft 9 in)	(Egypt) Petrojet SC
4	Mahmoud Abdelbaki	OH	14 December 2005	1.93 m (6 ft 4 in)	
5	Hazem Abdelhady	L	17 May 2006	1.83 m (6 ft 0 in)	
7	Yassin Hassan	S	24 August 2005	1.90 m (6 ft 3 in)	
8	Ahmed Reda Mohamed	OP	11 October 2006	1.96 m (6 ft 5 in)	
9	Ahmed Abo Gabal	OP	5 June 2008	1.99 m (6 ft 6 in)	
10	Mazen Abdelhameed	S	5 December 2006	1.96 m (6 ft 5 in)	
11	Malek Elkhafif	OH	13 April 2006	1.80 m (5 ft 11 in)	
15	Ibrahim Abdelmaksood	MB	30 January 2006	2.06 m (6 ft 9 in)	
21	Hamza Elsafy Awad	OH	17 September 2005	1.97 m (6 ft 6 in)	(United Arab Emirates) Shabab Al-Ahli
25	Asser Masoud	OH	8 March 2005	1.94 m (6 ft 4 in)	(Egypt) Wadi Degla SC

== See also ==
- Egypt men's national volleyball team
- Egypt men's national under-19 volleyball team
- Egypt men's national under-17 volleyball team
