= Belvedere Park =

Belvedere Park may refer to:

- Belvedere Park, Georgia, U.S.
- Belvedere Park (park), a park in Belvedere, California, U.S.
- Belvedere Park, Seattle, Washington, U.S. (see List of parks in Seattle)
- Belvedere Park, Victoria, Australia
- Belvedere Park, Tunis, Tunisia
