= 2024 Men's U20 African Nations Volleyball Championship =

Tournament details
- Host country: Tunisia
- City: Tunis
- Dates: 5–11 August
- Teams: 4
- Venue: 1 (in 1 host city)

Final positions
- Champions: Tunisia (11th title)
- Runners-up: Egypt
- Third place: Morocco
- Fourth place: Burundi

Tournament awards
- MVP: (Tunisia) Wajih Moalla
- Best Setter: (Tunisia) Fedi Ben Slimane
- Best OH: (Egypt) Hamza Awad (Tunisia) Rasem Ksouda
- Best MB: (Morocco) Mohamed El Kouche (Egypt) Youssef Elrassas
- Best OPP: (Tunisia) Wajih Moalla
- Best Libero: (Tunisia) Omar Ghrab

Tournament statistics
- Matches played: 10

The 2024 Men's U20 African Nations Volleyball Championship was the 21st edition of the Men's U21 African Volleyball Championship, the biennial international youth volleyball tournament organised by the African Volleyball Confederation (CAVB) for the men's under-20 national teams of Africa. It was held in Tunis, Tunisia from 5 to 11 August 2024.

Four national teams took part in the tournament, with players born on or after 1 January 2005 eligible to participate.

As in previous editions, the tournament acted as the CAVB qualifiers for the FIVB Volleyball Men's U21 World Championship. The top three teams qualified for the 2025 FIVB Volleyball Men's U21 World Championship in China as the CAVB representatives.

Tunisia won their eleventh title by beating Egypt 3–2 in the final. Morocco completed the podium after defeating Burundi in the third-place match. Champions Tunisia, runners-up Egypt and third-place Morocco qualified for the 2025 FIVB Volleyball Men's U21 World Championship.

== Host and venue ==
The African Volleyball Confederation awarded Tunisia the hosting rights for the tournament on 24 June 2024. The competition took place in Tunis at the Al Machatel Hall, a venue located in the Baldevebe Nursery west of Belvedere Park. The Al Machatel Hall had been inaugurated in July 2024.

== Preliminary round ==
All match times are in local times, TNT (UTC+1), as listed by CAVB.

Pos	Team	Pld	W	L	Pts	SW	SL	SR	SPW	SPL	SPR	Qualification
1	Egypt	3	3	0	9	9	1	9.000	246	162	1.519	Semi-final 1
2	Tunisia (H)	3	2	1	6	7	3	2.333	226	209	1.081	Semi-final 2
3	Morocco	3	1	2	3	3	6	0.500	178	198	0.899	Semi-final 2
4	Burundi	3	0	3	0	0	9	0.000	144	225	0.640	Semi-final 1

Source: FIVB
Rules for classification: 1) Matches won; 2) Points; 3) Sets ratio; 4) Setpoints ratio; 5) Head-to-head result.
(H) Host

Date	Time		Score		Set 1	Set 2	Set 3	Set 4	Set 5	Total	Report
5 Aug	15:00	Burundi	0–3	Egypt	9–25	13–25	18–25			40–75	Report
5 Aug	18:00	Tunisia	3–0	Morocco	25–20	25–19	25–18			75–57	Report
6 Aug	16:00	Egypt	3–0	Morocco	25–14	26–15	25–17			76–46	Report
6 Aug	18:00	Tunisia	3–0	Burundi	25–16	25–21	25–19			75–56	Report
7 Aug	18:00	Morocco	3–0	Burundi	25–17	26–15	25–16			76–48	Report
7 Aug	20:00	Egypt	3–1	Tunisia	21–25	25–15	25–16	25–20		96–76	Report

== Final round ==
Semi-finals
9 August
Egypt	3
Burundi	0
9 August
Tunisia	3
Morocco	0

Final
11 August
Egypt	2
Tunisia	3
Third-place match
10 August
Burundi	0
Morocco	3

=== Semi-finals ===
Date	Time		Score		Set 1	Set 2	Set 3	Set 4	Set 5	Total	Report
9 Aug	16:00	Egypt	3–0	Burundi	25–10	25–20	25–18			75–48	Report
9 Aug	18:00	Tunisia	3–0	Morocco	25–17	25–19	25–21			75–57	Report

=== 3rd place match ===
Date	Time		Score		Set 1	Set 2	Set 3	Set 4	Set 5	Total	Report
9 Aug	16:00	Burundi	0–3	Morocco	23–25	16–25	18–25			57–75	Report

=== Final ===
Date	Time		Score		Set 1	Set 2	Set 3	Set 4	Set 5	Total	Report
9 Aug	16:00	Egypt	2–3	Tunisia	27–25	16–25	25–22	21–25	13–15	102–112	Report

== Final standing ==
Qualified for 2025 FIVB Men's U21 World Championship.

Rank	Team
1st place, gold medalist(s)	Tunisia
2nd place, silver medalist(s)	Egypt
3rd place, bronze medalist(s)	Morocco
4	Burundi

2024 Men's U20 African champions

Tunisia
Eleventh title

Team roster:

1 Wajih Moalla, 2 Abdelkarim Frikha, 4 Aziz Ben Houria, 6 Adem Ben Messaoud, 7 Mohamed Amine Jenzi, 8 Omar Bellalouna, 9 Fedi Klouj, 10 Racem Ksouda (c), 11 Fedi Ben Slimen, 13 Mohamed Aziz Trabelsi, 14 Ayoub Messelmeni, 15 Omar Ghrab (L)

Head coach: (Tunisia) Tarek Ouni

== Individual awards ==
The following individual awards were presented at the end of the tournament.

- Most valuable player (MVP)

Wajih Moalla (TUN)

- Best middle blockers

Mohamed El Kouche (MAR)
Youssef Elrassas (EGY)

- Best setter

Fedi Ben Slimane (TUN)

- Best opposite spiker

Wajih Moalla (TUN)

- Best outside spikers

Hamza Awad (EGY)
Rasem Ksouda (TUN)

- Best libero

Omar Ghrab (TUN)
