= Men's U20 African Nations Volleyball Championship =

International youth volleyball competition

Men's U20 African Volleyball Championship
- Most recent season or competition: 2025 Men's U20 African Nations Volleyball Championship
- Sport: Volleyball
- Founded: 1984
- First season: 1984
- Continent: CAVB (Africa)
- Most recent champion: Egypt (7th title)
- Most titles: Tunisia (11 titles)

The Men's U20 African Volleyball Championship is a sport competition for national teams with players under 20 years, currently held biannually and organized by the African Volleyball Confederation, the Africa volleyball federation. The competition was played with teams of U21 till the 2022 edition.

== Result summary ==
=== Men's U21 African Volleyball Championship ===
| Year | Host | Final | | | 3rd place match | | |
| Year | Host | Champions | Score | Runners-up | 3rd place | Score | 4th place |
|---|---|---|---|---|---|---|---|
| 1984; Details | (Egypt); Cairo | Tunisia | – | Egypt | Cameroon | | |
| 1986; Details | (Algeria); Sétif | Algeria | – | Egypt | Tunisia | | |
| 1988; Details | (Mauritius)... | Algeria | – | Mauritius | Angola | | |
| 1990; Details | (Tunisia); Tunis | Tunisia | – | Algeria | Morocco | | |
| 1992; Details | (Egypt) (Tunisia); Cairo / Tunis | Tunisia | – | Egypt | | | |
| 1994; Details | (Tunisia); Tunis | Algeria | – | Tunisia | Morocco | | |
| 1996; Details | (Tunisia); Sidi Bou Said | Tunisia | – | Morocco | Egypt | | |
| 1998; Details | (South Africa)... | Tunisia | – | Morocco | Cameroon | – | South Africa |
| 2000; Details | (Tunisia); Kélibia | Tunisia | – | Egypt | Botswana | | |
| 2002; Details | (Egypt); Cairo | Egypt | Round-robin | Tunisia | Algeria | Round-robin | Sudan |
| 2004; Details | (Kenya); Nairobi | Morocco | 3–2 | Tunisia | Egypt | 3–0 | Kenya |
| 2006; Details | (Morocco); Casablanca | Egypt | Round-robin | Tunisia | Morocco | Round-robin | Sudan |
| 2008; Details | (Tunisia); Sidi Bou Said | Tunisia | 3–0 | Egypt | Morocco | 3–1 | Kenya |
| 2010; Details | (Libya); Misrata | Tunisia | 3–2 | Egypt | Morocco | 3–0 | Rwanda |
| 2013; Details | (Tunisia); Sidi Bou Said | Tunisia | 3–1 | Egypt | Rwanda | 3–0 | Morocco |
| 2015; Details | (Egypt); Cairo | Egypt | Round-robin | Algeria | Morocco | | |
| 2016; Details | (Morocco); Casablanca | Egypt | Best-of-three | Morocco | | | |
| 2018; Details | (Nigeria); Abuja | Tunisia | 3–1 | Egypt | Morocco | 3–1 | Rwanda |
| 2020; Details | (Egypt); Cairo | Egypt | Round-robin | Cameroon | Morocco | Round-robin | DR Congo |
| 2022; Details | (Tunisia); Tunis | Egypt | 3–1 | Tunisia | Cameroon | 3–0 | Nigeria |

=== Men's U20 African Volleyball Championship ===
| Year | Host | Final | | | 3rd place match | | |
| Year | Host | Champions | Score | Runners-up | 3rd place | Score | 4th place |
|---|---|---|---|---|---|---|---|
| 2024; Details | (Tunisia); Tunis | Tunisia | 3–2 | Egypt | Morocco | 3–0 | Burundi |
| 2025; Details | (Egypt); Cairo | Egypt | 3–0 | Cameroon | Kenya | 3–1 | Uganda |

== Performance by nation ==
| N° | Team | Champions | Runners-up | 3rd place | Total |
|---|---|---|---|---|---|
| 1 | Tunisia | 11 (1984, 1990, 1992, 1996, 1998, 2000, 2008, 2010, 2013, 2018, 2024) | 5 (1994, 2002, 2004, 2006, 2022) | 1 (1986) | 17 |
| 2 | Egypt | 7 (2002, 2006, 2015, 2016, 2020, 2022, 2025) | 9 (1984, 1986, 1992, 2000, 2008, 2010, 2013, 2018, 2024) | 2 (1996, 2004) | 18 |
| 3 | Algeria | 3 (1986, 1988, 1994) | 2 (1990, 2015) | 1 (2002) | 6 |
| 4 | Morocco | 1 (2004) | 3 (1996, 1998, 2016) | 9 (1990, 1994, 2006, 2008, 2010, 2015, 2018, 2020, 2024) | 13 |
| 5 | Cameroon | | 2 (2020, 2025) | 3 (1984, 1998, 2022) | 5 |
| 6 | Mauritius | | 1 (1988) | | 1 |
| 7 | Angola | | | 1 (1988) | 1 |
| 7 | Botswana | | | 1 (2000) | 1 |
| 7 | Kenya | | | 1 (2025) | 1 |
| 7 | Rwanda | | | 1 (2013) | 1 |

== See also ==
- Women's Africa Volleyball Championship U20
