= Denis Bogdan =

Russian volleyball player (born 1996)

Personal information
- Nationality: Russian
- Born: October 13, 1996 (age 30) Grodno, Belarus
- Height: 200 cm (6 ft 7 in)
- Weight: 92 kg (203 lb)

Volleyball information
- Current team: Dinamo Moscow

Career
- Years: Team
- 2015 - 2021 2021 -: Fakel Novy Urengoy; Dinamo Moscow

National team
- Years: Team
- 2021 -: Russia
Honours
Volleyball
Representing ROC
Olympic Games
Silver medal – second place	2020 Tokyo	Team
Representing Russia
Summer Universiade
Bronze medal – third place	2019 Naples	Team
World U23 Championship
Silver medal – second place	2017 Egypt	Under-23
World U21 Championship
Gold medal – first place	2015 Mexico	Under-21

Denis Valerievich Bogdan (Russian: Денис Валерьевич Богдан, IPA: [dʲɪˈnʲiz ˈboɡdən]; born 13 October 1996) is a Belarusian-born Russian volleyball player and a member of the Russian men's national volleyball team.

== Sporting achievements ==
=== Clubs ===
- CEV Challenge Cup
  - 2015/2016 - with Fakel Novy Urengoy
  - 2016/2017 - with Fakel Novy Urengoy
- National championships
  - 2021/2022 Russian Championship, with Dynamo Moscow
  - 2021/2022 Russian Super Cup, with Dynamo Moscow
