= 2015 FIVB Volleyball Men's U21 World Championship – European qualification =

The European qualification for the 2015 FIVB Volleyball Men's U21 World Championship, in Mexico will be played over two rounds.

In the first round of qualification, 21 teams are split into six pools. The pool winners will qualify for the second round and join the champions and the runners-up of the 2014 U20 European Championship already secured in the second round.

== First round ==
=== Pools ===
The pools were confirmed by CEV on October 7, 2014.

Pool A	Pool B	Pool C	Pool D	Pool E	Pool F
Czech Republic; Denmark; Italy	Estonia; Slovenia; Turkey	Austria; Romania; Serbia	Belgium; Portugal; Slovakia; Ukraine	France; Greece; Hungary; Latvia	Bulgaria; Croatia; Germany; Netherlands

=== Pool A ===
- Venue: Kildeskovshallen, Gentofte, Denmark
- All times are Central European Time (UTC+01:00).

Pos	Team	Pld	W	L	Pts	SW	SL	SR	SPW	SPL	SPR	Qualification
1	Italy	2	2	0	6	6	2	3.000	195	155	1.258	Second round
2	Czech Republic	2	1	1	3	4	3	1.333	160	159	1.006	
3	Denmark	2	0	2	0	1	6	0.167	132	173	0.763	

Date	Time		Score		Set 1	Set 2	Set 3	Set 4	Set 5	Total	Report
09 Jan	19:00	Italy	3–1	Czech Republic	22–25	25–21	25–22	25–17		97–85	Report
10 Jan	17:00	Czech Republic	3–0	Denmark	25–16	25–23	25–23			75–62	Report
11 Jan	17:00	Denmark	1–3	Italy	25–23	15–25	12–25	18–25		70–98	Report

=== Pool B ===
- Venue: Športna Dvorana Hoče, Spodnje Hoče, Slovenia
- All times are Central European Time (UTC+01:00).

Pos	Team	Pld	W	L	Pts	SW	SL	SR	SPW	SPL	SPR	Qualification
1	Slovenia	2	2	0	6	6	0	MAX	150	123	1.220	Second round
2	Turkey	2	1	1	3	3	3	1.000	134	135	0.993	
3	Estonia	2	0	2	0	0	6	0.000	125	151	0.828	

Date	Time		Score		Set 1	Set 2	Set 3	Set 4	Set 5	Total	Report
09 Jan	17:00	Estonia	0–3	Turkey	24–26	17–25	19–25			60–76	Report
10 Jan	17:00	Slovenia	3–0	Estonia	25–23	25–19	25–23			75–65	Report
11 Jan	17:00	Turkey	0–3	Slovenia	20–25	17–25	21–25			58–75	Report

=== Pool C ===
- Venue: Bluebox Hall, Graz, Austria
- All times are Central European Time (UTC+01:00).

Pos	Team	Pld	W	L	Pts	SW	SL	SR	SPW	SPL	SPR	Qualification
1	Austria	2	2	0	4	6	4	1.500	222	198	1.121	Second round
2	Serbia	2	1	1	4	5	4	1.250	203	196	1.036	
3	Romania	2	0	2	1	3	6	0.500	178	209	0.852	

Date	Time		Score		Set 1	Set 2	Set 3	Set 4	Set 5	Total	Report
08 Jan	17:00	Romania	2–3	Austria	18–25	25–23	25–21	18–25	9–15	95–109	Report
09 Jan	17:00	Serbia	3–1	Romania	25–21	25–27	25–19	25–16		100–83	Report
10 Jan	17:00	Austria	3–2	Serbia	25–23	26–28	22–25	25–16	15–11	113–103	Report

=== Pool D ===
- Venue: Eurovolley Center, Vilvoorde, Belgium
- All times are Central European Time (UTC+01:00).

Pos	Team	Pld	W	L	Pts	SW	SL	SR	SPW	SPL	SPR	Qualification
1	Belgium	3	3	0	9	9	2	4.500	269	233	1.155	Second round
2	Ukraine	3	1	2	4	5	6	0.833	245	248	0.988	
3	Slovakia	3	1	2	3	6	8	0.750	286	296	0.966	
4	Portugal	3	1	2	2	4	8	0.500	259	282	0.918	

Date	Time		Score		Set 1	Set 2	Set 3	Set 4	Set 5	Total	Report
09 Jan	17:00	Portugal	0–3	Ukraine	30–32	22–25	21–25			73–82	Report
09 Jan	20:00	Belgium	3–1	Slovakia	25–17	25–19	23–25	25–21		98–82	Report
10 Jan	17:00	Ukraine	2–3	Slovakia	25–16	18–25	25–19	20–25	12–15	100–100	Report
10 Jan	20:00	Portugal	1–3	Belgium	25–21	23–25	19–25	21–25		88–96	Report
11 Jan	15:00	Slovakia	2–3	Portugal	23–25	25–11	25–22	21–25	10–15	104–98	Report
11 Jan	18:00	Ukraine	0–3	Belgium	21–25	20–25	22–25			63–75	Report

=== Pool E ===
- Venue: Bujtosi Szabadidő Csarnok, Nyíregyháza, Hungary
- All times are Central European Time (UTC+01:00).

Pos	Team	Pld	W	L	Pts	SW	SL	SR	SPW	SPL	SPR	Qualification
1	France	3	3	0	9	9	1	9.000	261	219	1.192	Second round
2	Hungary	3	2	1	6	6	5	1.200	252	237	1.063	
3	Greece	3	1	2	3	5	7	0.714	280	285	0.982	
4	Latvia	3	0	3	0	2	9	0.222	217	269	0.807	

Date	Time		Score		Set 1	Set 2	Set 3	Set 4	Set 5	Total	Report
09 Jan	15:30	Greece	1–3	France	19–25	25–20	26–28	33–35		103–108	Report
09 Jan	18:00	Hungary	3–1	Latvia	25–21	25–18	22–25	25–15		97–79	Report
10 Jan	15:30	France	3–0	Latvia	25–18	25–23	25–15			75–56	Report
10 Jan	28:00	Greece	1–3	Hungary	25–20	15–25	23–25	17–25		80–95	Report
11 Jan	15:30	Latvia	1–3	Greece	23–25	19–25	25–22	15–25		82–97	Report
11 Jan	18:00	France	3–0	Hungary	25–16	28–26	25–18			78–60	Report

=== Pool F ===
- Venue: Landstede Sportcentrum, Zwolle, Netherlands
- All times are Central European Time (UTC+01:00).

Pos	Team	Pld	W	L	Pts	SW	SL	SR	SPW	SPL	SPR	Qualification
1	Germany	3	3	0	9	9	2	4.500	273	240	1.138	Second round
2	Bulgaria	3	2	1	6	6	4	1.500	239	229	1.044	
3	Netherlands	3	1	2	2	5	8	0.625	275	290	0.948	
4	Croatia	3	0	3	1	3	9	0.333	245	273	0.897	

Date	Time		Score		Set 1	Set 2	Set 3	Set 4	Set 5	Total	Report
09 Jan	15:00	Croatia	2–3	Netherlands	15–25	18–25	25–22	25–15	12–15	95–102	Report
09 Jan	17:30	Germany	3–0	Bulgaria	25–19	25–23	28–26			78–68	Report
10 Jan	15:00	Netherlands	1–3	Bulgaria	25–20	22–25	18–25	22–25		87–95	Report
10 Jan	17:30	Croatia	1–3	Germany	18–25	21–25	25–20	22–25		86–95	Report
11 Jan	15:00	Bulgaria	3–0	Croatia	25–19	25–21	26–24			76–64	Report
11 Jan	17:30	Netherlands	1–3	Germany	19–25	25–27	25–23	17–25		86–100	Report

== Second round ==
=== Pool G ===
- Venue: Energia Hall, Bełchatów, Poland
- All times are Central European Summer Time (UTC+02:00).

Pos	Team	Pld	W	L	Pts	SW	SL	SR	SPW	SPL	SPR	Qualification
1	Poland	3	3	0	9	9	1	9.000	245	188	1.303	2015 U21 World Championship
2	Italy	3	2	1	6	6	4	1.500	231	234	0.987	
3	France	3	1	2	3	5	7	0.714	267	272	0.982	
4	Austria	3	0	3	0	1	9	0.111	198	247	0.802	

Date	Time		Score		Set 1	Set 2	Set 3	Set 4	Set 5	Total	Report
15 May	17:00	Poland	3–0	Italy	25–19	25–22	25–17			75–58	Report
15 May	20:00	Austria	1–3	France	25–19	18–25	18–25	21–25		82–94	Report
16 May	15:00	Italy	3–1	France	25–22	25–19	20–25	25–22		95–88	Report
16 May	18:00	Poland	3–0	Austria	25–17	25–11	25–17			75–45	Report
17 May	15:00	Italy	3–0	Austria	25–22	25–23	28–26			78–71	Report
17 May	18:00	France	1–3	Poland	17–25	25–19	19–25	24–26		85–95	Report

=== Pool H ===
- Venue: Športna Dvorana Nova Gorica, Nova Gorica, Slovenia
- All times are Central European Summer Time (UTC+02:00).

Pos	Team	Pld	W	L	Pts	SW	SL	SR	SPW	SPL	SPR	Qualification
1	Slovenia	3	3	0	9	9	1	9.000	251	219	1.146	2015 U21 World Championship
2	Germany	3	2	1	6	7	3	2.333	236	211	1.118	
3	Belgium	3	1	2	2	3	8	0.375	236	249	0.948	
4	Russia	3	0	3	1	2	9	0.222	219	263	0.833	

Date	Time		Score		Set 1	Set 2	Set 3	Set 4	Set 5	Total	Report
15 May	15:00	Belgium	0–3	Germany	18–25	17–25	21–25			56–75	Report
15 May	18:00	Slovenia	3–0	Russia	25–20	25–21	26–24			76–65	Report
16 May	15:00	Germany	3–0	Russia	25–19	25–19	25–19			75–57	Report
16 May	18:00	Belgium	0–3	Slovenia	20–25	23–25	25–27			68–77	Report
17 May	15:00	Russia	2–3	Belgium	25–23	15–25	18–25	25–23	14–16	97–112	Report
17 May	18:00	Germany	1–3	Slovenia	25–23	22–25	16–25	23–25		86–98	Report
