= 2016 African Volleyball Championship U21 =

Official competition for U21 national volleyball teams of Africa

Tournament details
- Host country: Morocco
- City: Casablanca
- Dates: 22–23 September
- Teams: 2 (from 1 confederation)
- Venue: 1 (in 1 host city)

Final positions
- Champions: Egypt (4th title)
- Runners-up: Morocco

Tournament statistics
- Matches played: 2

The 2016 African Volleyball Championship U21 was held in Casablanca, Morocco from 22 to 23 September 2016. The champions of the tournament qualified for the 2017 FIVB Volleyball Men's U21 World Championship.

Egypt finished the two-team best-of-three tournament on top of the standing to clinch their fourth title.

== Qualification ==
Two CAVB under-21 national teams registered to participate in the 2016 African Championship U21.

- Morocco (hosts)
- Egypt

== Best of three ==
Final
Morocco	1	1
Egypt	3	3

Date		Score		Set 1	Set 2	Set 3	Set 4	Set 5	Total
22 Sep	Morocco	1–3	Egypt	17–25	25–21	24–26	19–25		85–97
23 Sep	Morocco	1–3	Egypt	29–27	20–25	19–25	22-25		90–102

== Final standing ==
Rank	Team
1st place, gold medalist(s)	Egypt
2nd place, silver medalist(s)	Morocco

Qualified for the 2017 U21 World Championship

2016 African Champions U21

Egypt
4th title
