= Belvedere Park, Tunis =

Park in Tunis

Coordinates: 36°49′20″N 10°10′18″E

Belvedere Park
- منتزه البلفيدير
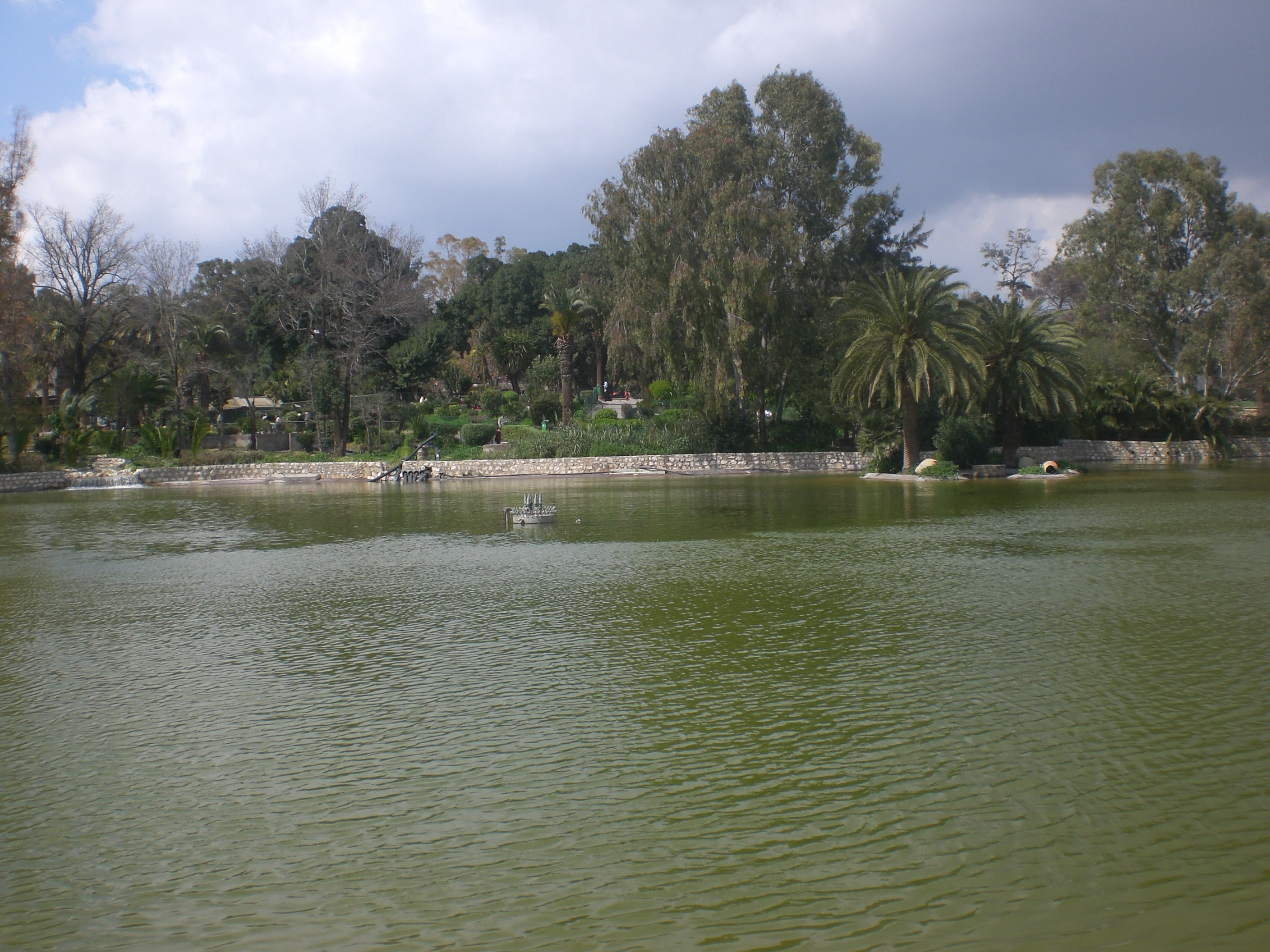
- Pond at Belvedere Park
- Interactive map of Belvedere Park
- Type: English Garden
- Location: Tunis, Tunisia
- Area: 110 ha (270 acres)
- Created: 1894
- Designer: Joseph Laforcade
- Status: Open
- Website: Association des amis du Belvédère

Belvedere Park (Parc du Belvédère, Arabic:منتزه البلفيدير) is the largest park in the city of Tunis (Tunisia). Built at the end of the 19th century, it is located in the northern part of the city.

== History ==
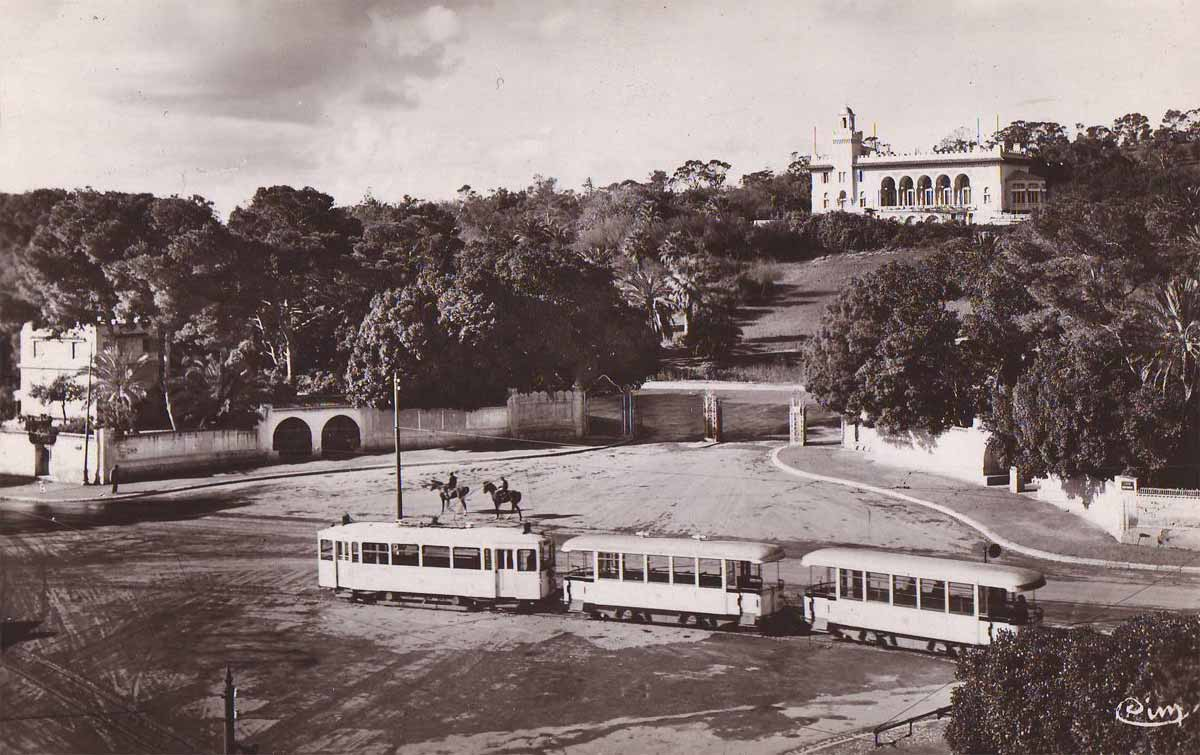
Tramway in front of Belvedere Park

The park was created in 1892 on a hill covered with an old olive grove of 110 hectares.

Designed by Joseph Laforcade, the chief gardener of Paris at the time, this English-style park was planted with shrubs, groves, and lawns. It included drivable roads, horse paths, and pedestrian trails, with plants supplied by the Tunis Test Garden established the previous year. The plantings were completed in 1897, after which the park was closed to the public for over a decade to allow the vegetation to mature. The park also received a midha from the Souk El Attarine and a domed pavilion (or koubba) from a palace in La Manouba to enhance its attractions.

In September 1901, a neo-Moorish style pavilion, the Belvedere Casino, was opened at the park's entrance and officially inaugurated in 1910. (The term "casino" comes from the Italian for "little house" – gambling has never taken place there.) Between 1963 and 1969, a zoo designed by landscape architects from the city of Cologne was added, featuring a pond, play areas, and a cafeteria.

== Description ==
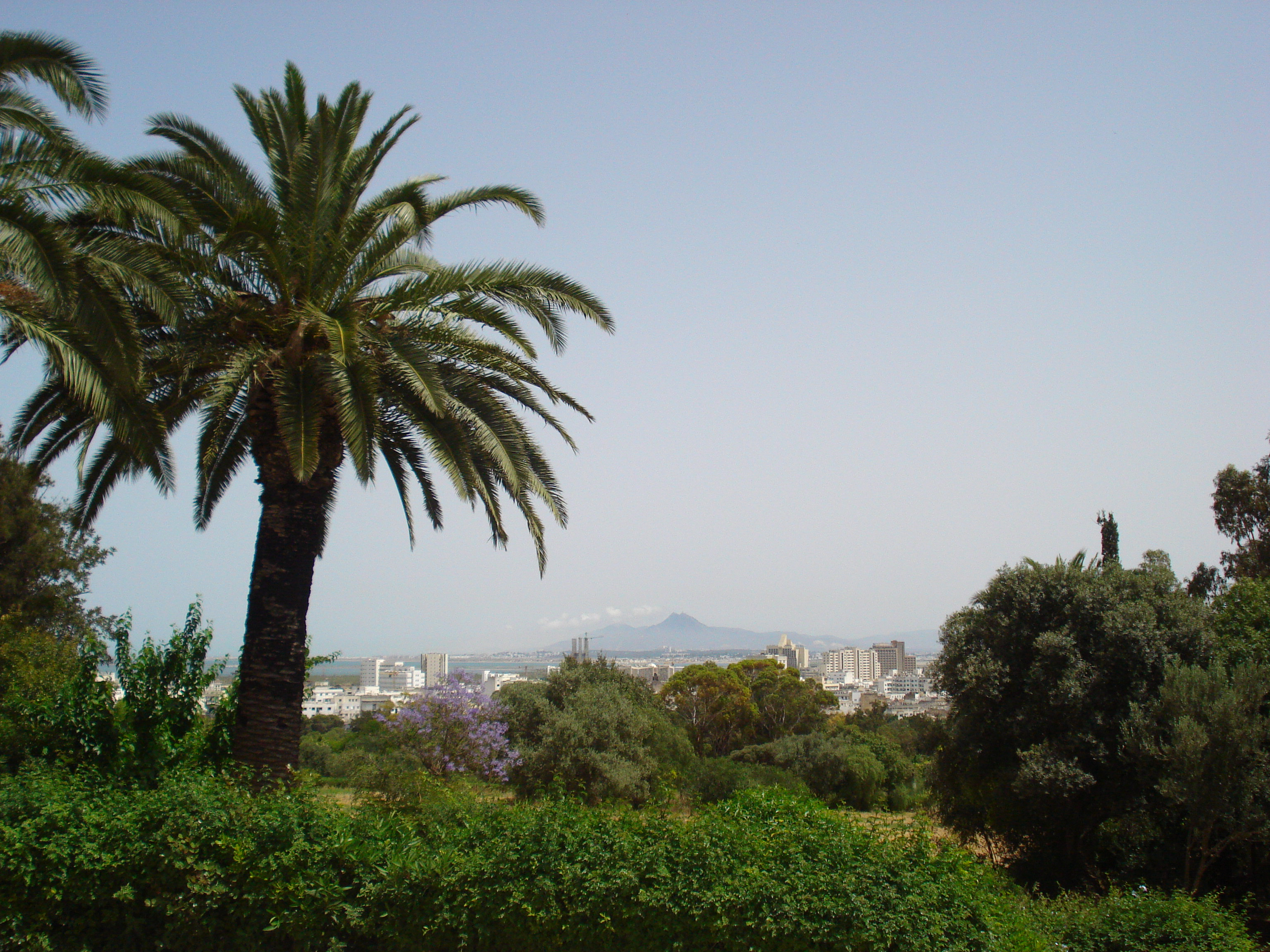
View of the city of Tunis from the top of the park.

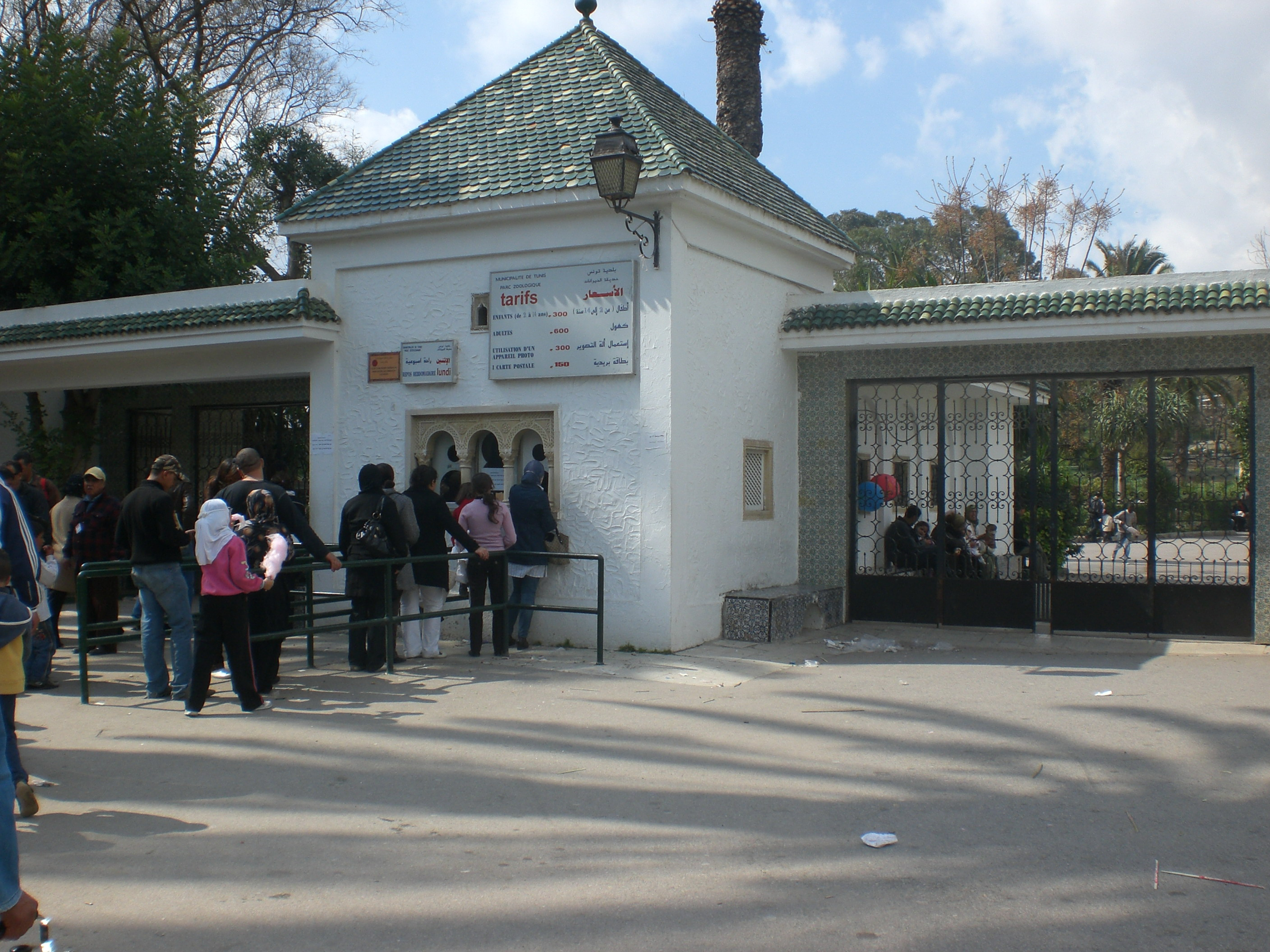
Entrance to the zoo

The Belvedere Park, located in the heart of Tunis, serves as a significant urban oasis with a vast expanse accessible by shaded pathways and roads for both pedestrians and vehicles. Established on a hillside, the park is distinguished by its diverse flora including pines, palms, ficus, eucalyptus, and olive trees, offering a refreshing retreat from the urban heat. Within its boundaries, the park houses the Tunis Zoo, which spans thirteen hectares and is home to 155 species of African wildlife, drawing approximately one million visitors annually. It also features three treasures of Arabo-Muslim architecture: the Midha, Kobbet El Haoua, and the Belvedere Casino. Additional features include an Andalusian-style café, an artificial lake, and children's attractions. The park's entrance is marked by the Modern Art Museum of Tunis.

== Belvedere Casino ==
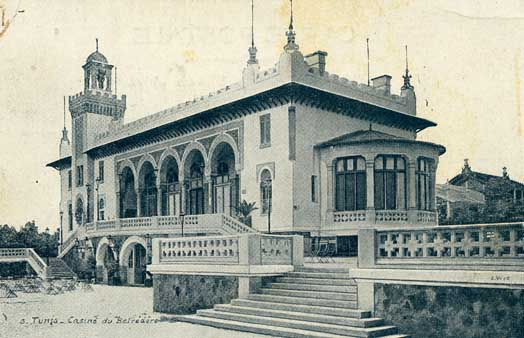
Belvedere Casino circa 1900

The Belvedere Casino, or Casino du Belvédère, is a neo-Moorish style pavilion near the east entrance of the park. It opened in September 1901 and was officially inaugurated in 1910. It served as a space for public and private functions, and hosted concerts by musical luminaries including Farid El Atrach and Jacques Brel. From 1977 to 1989, it accommodated the Center of Alive Arts of the Viewpoint, which exhibited works of famous painters including Picasso and Miro.

In 1989, President Zine El Abidine Ben Ali gave the casino to the army, to placate them after having confiscated some military land. Since that time, it has served as an officers' club and is not open to the public.

== Belvedere Park Zoo ==
The Belvedere Park Zoo (French: Parc Zoologique Belvedere) is located within Belvedere Park. In 1963, the zoo was founded and formally opened. Located in Belvedere Park, it is a popular tourist destination in the heart of the city, despite complaints about the living situation of the animals that live there.

On March 3rd, 2017, after visitors stoned a crocodile, the zoo had closed. It reopened on April 17th in the same year.

The zoo is home to animals like the Rhesus macaque, brown bear, Bengal tiger, lion, dromedary, African bush elephant, European fallow deer, Arabian horse, greylag goose, white stork, Nile crocodile, Hamadryas baboon, emu, addax, Indian peafowl, llama, striped hyena, crested porcupine, wallaby, sun conure, cockatiel, blue-and-yellow macaw, American flamingo, common ostrich, lechwe, wild boar, capybara, long-legged buzzard, guinea pig, raccoon, golden eagle, mute swan, African wolf, Cape fur seal, white rhinoceros, African leopard, Grant's zebra, and the hippopotamus.

== Koubba ==
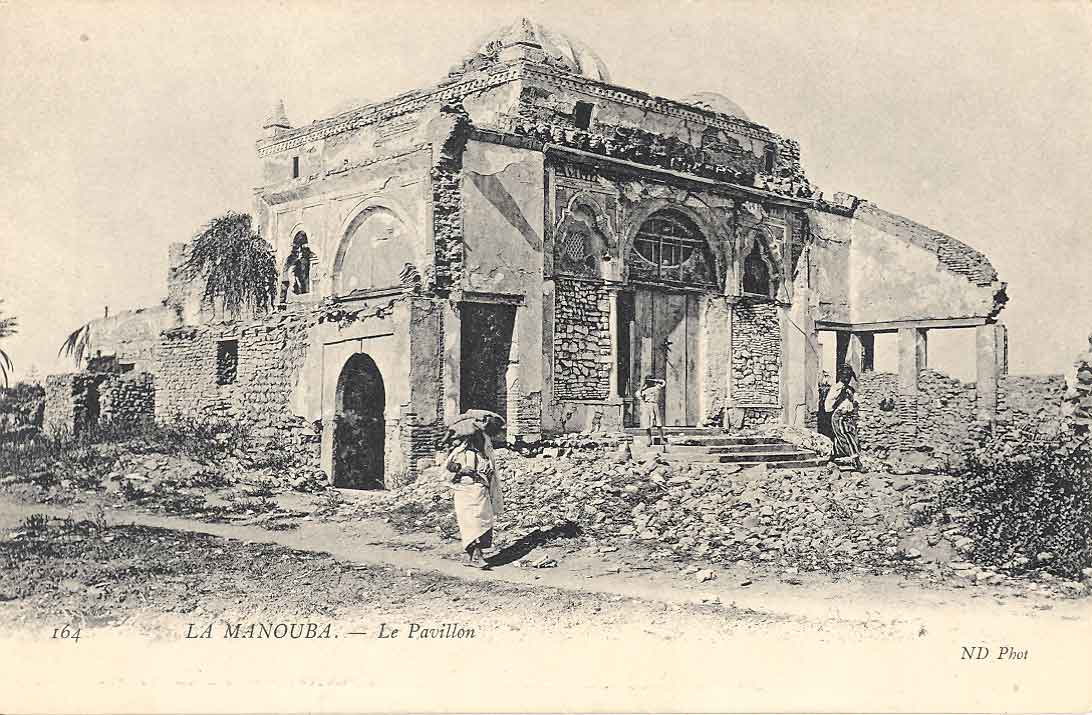
La Manouba — Le Pavillon, c. 1901: The koubba in its original location

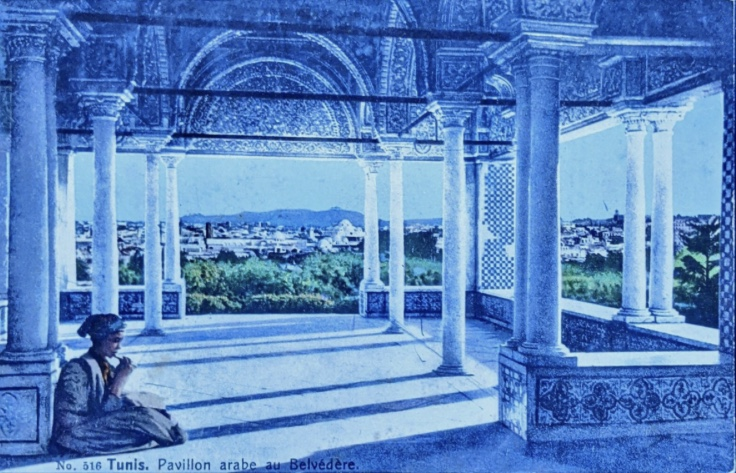
Pavillon arabe au Belvédère, c. 1920: the building as restored

The upper part of the park is crowned with a domed cupola (koubba or qubba) in Moorish style, dating from the 17th century. The cupola consists of a square room with an apse covered by a roof from which emerge four small domes and a larger, ribbed central dome. Known as Qubbat al-Hawa' ('Cupola of air'), it was originally located in the dependencies of a beylical palace in La Manouba called the Rose Palace, which today houses the Tunisian National Military Museum.

In the early years of the 20th century, the authorities of the protectorate acquired it, in a run-down state, with later infilling of blockwork, had it dismantled, and by 1905 had reassembled it in the Belvedere park, but in a restoration of its original form. It thus enjoyed a second youth, unfolding its galleries, sculpted plaster arches, colonnades, stained glass windows, and panels of openwork stucco.

The terrace where this building stands overlooks the park, with views to the Gulf of Tunis and the distant Jebel Boukornine.

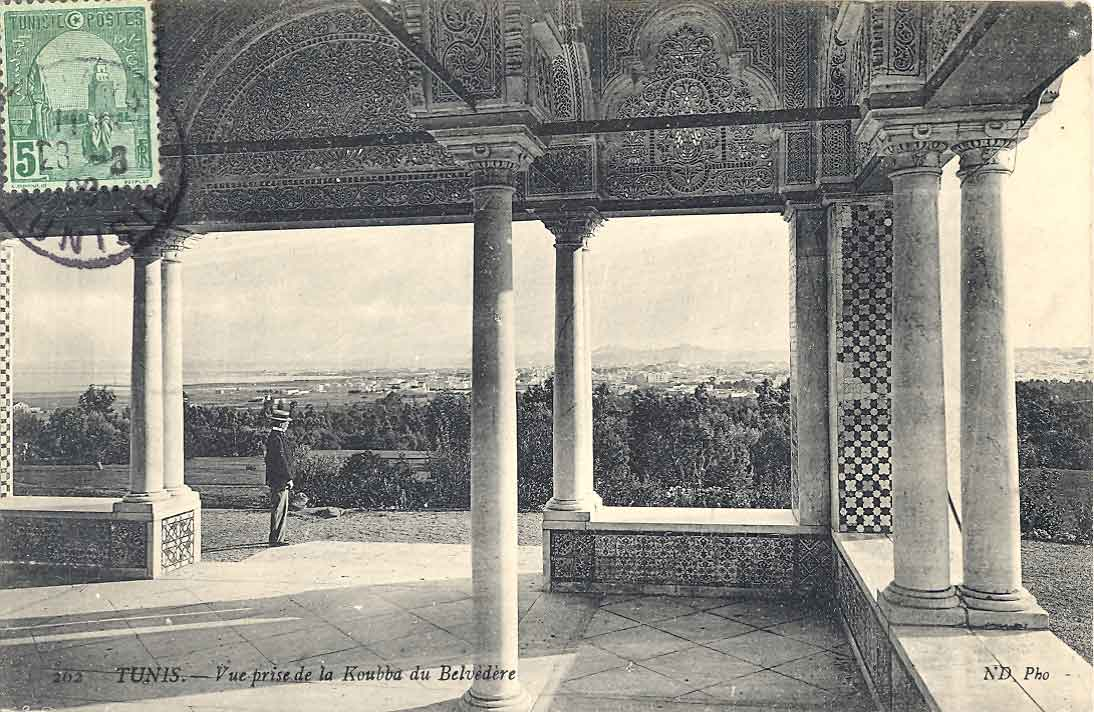
Panorama of Tunis (1905).

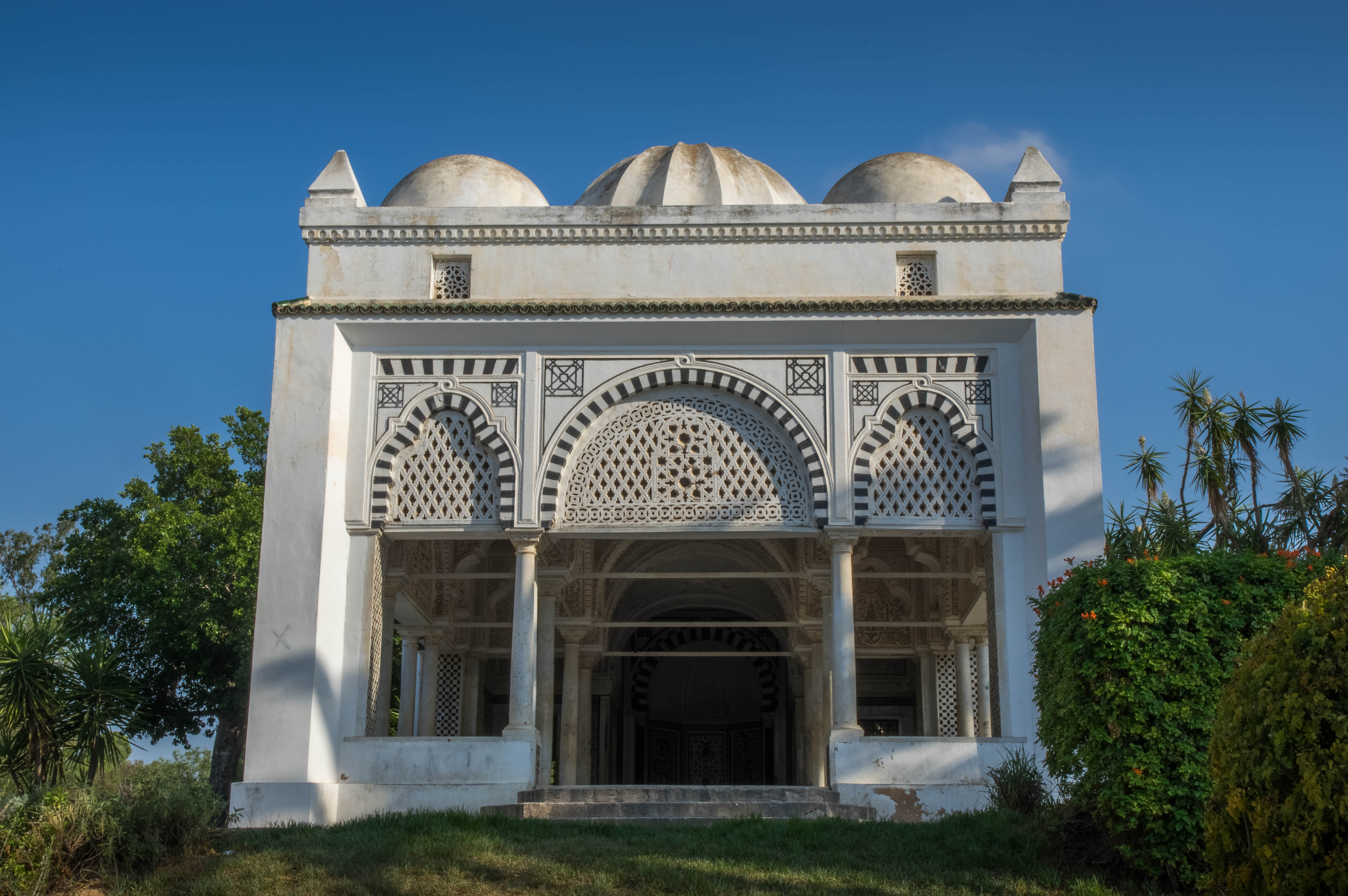
One of the façades of the Koubba.

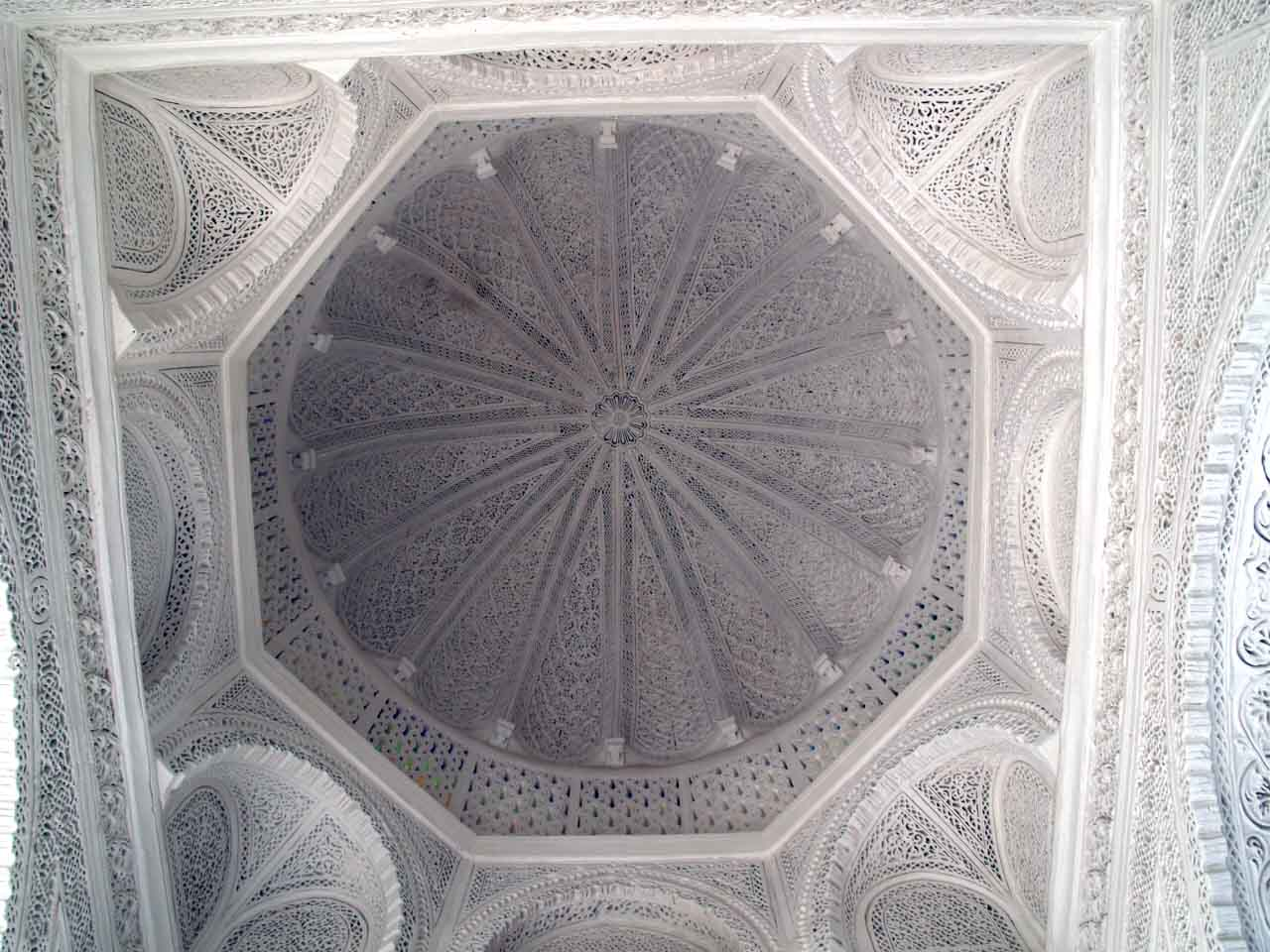
Interior view of one of the five domes.
