= 2015 African Volleyball Championship U21 =

Tournament details
- Host country: Egypt
- City: Cairo
- Dates: 27 February – 1 March
- Teams: 3 (from 1 confederation)
- Venue: 1 (in 1 host city)

Final positions
- Champions: Egypt (3rd title)
- Runners-up: Algeria
- Third place: Morocco

Tournament awards
- MVP: (Egypt) Ahmed Diaa
- Best Setter: (Egypt) Ahmed El Ashry
- Best Libero: (Algeria) Ibrahim Sbaibi

Tournament statistics
- Matches played: 3
- Best spiker: (Morocco) Hamza Ouafi
- Best blocker: (Egypt) Abdelrahman Abdalla
- Best server: (Egypt) Mohamed Ali Elsheikh
- Best receiver: (Algeria) Larbi Hedroug

The 2015 African Volleyball Championship U21 was held in Cairo, Egypt from 27 February to 1 March 2015. The champions of the tournament qualified for the 2015 FIVB Volleyball Men's U21 World Championship.

Egypt finished the three-team round-robin tournament on top of the standing to clinch their third title.

== Qualification ==
Three CAVB under-21 national teams registered to participate in the 2015 African Championship U21.

- Egypt (hosts)
- Algeria
- Morocco

== Venue ==
- Eastern Company Hall, Cairo, Egypt

== Round robin ==
- All times are Eastern European Time (UTC+02:00).

Pos	Team	Pld	W	L	Pts	SW	SL	SR	SPW	SPL	SPR
1	Egypt	2	2	0	6	6	1	6.000	170	143	1.189
2	Algeria	2	1	1	3	4	4	1.000	186	171	1.088
3	Morocco	2	0	2	0	1	6	0.167	128	170	0.753

Date	Time		Score		Set 1	Set 2	Set 3	Set 4	Set 5	Total
27 Feb	20:00	Egypt	3–0	Morocco	25–13	25–20	25–19			75–52
28 Feb	18:00	Algeria	3–1	Morocco	20–25	25–20	25–16	25–15		95–76
1 Mar	19:00	Algeria	1–3	Egypt	23–25	25–20	22–25	21–25		91–95

== Final standing ==
Rank	Team
1st place, gold medalist(s)	Egypt
2nd place, silver medalist(s)	Algeria
3rd place, bronze medalist(s)	Morocco

Qualified for the 2015 U21 World Championship

2015 African Champions U21

Egypt
3rd title

== Awards ==
- Most valuable player
  (Egypt) Ahmed Diaa
- Best spiker
  (Morocco) Hamza Ouafi
- Best blocker
  (Egypt) Abdelrahman Abdalla
- Best server
  (Egypt) Mohamed Ali Elsheikh
- Best setter
  (Egypt) Ahmed El Ashry
- Best receiver
  (Algeria) Larbi Hedroug
- Best libero
  (Algeria) Ibrahim Sbaibi
