= 2020 African Volleyball Championship U21 =

Tournament details
- Host country: Egypt
- City: Cairo
- Dates: 20–24 February 2021
- Teams: 4 (from 1 confederation)
- Venue: 1 (in 1 host city)

Final positions
- Champions: Egypt (5th title)
- Runners-up: Cameroon
- Third place: Morocco
- Fourth place: DR Congo

Tournament awards
- MVP: (Egypt) Marawan El Safy
- Best Setter: (Egypt) Anas Shawky
- Best Libero: (Cameroon) Stephanie Mana

Tournament statistics
- Matches played: 6
- Best spiker: (Morocco) Driss Mostari
- Best blocker: (Cameroon) Derrick Deffo
- Best server: (Egypt) Ahmed Abelazeem Mido
- Best receiver: (Egypt) Abdelrahman El Hossini

The 2020 African Volleyball Championship U21 was held in Cairo, Egypt from 20 to 24 February 2021. The top two teams of the tournament qualified for the 2021 FIVB Volleyball Men's U21 World Championship.

Egypt finished the fout-team round-robin tournament on top of the standing to clinch their fifth title.

== Qualification ==
Five CAVB under-21 national teams registered to participate in the 2020 African Championship U21. Central African Republic later withdrew.

- Egypt (Hosts)
- ~~Central African Republic~~
- Cameroon
- DR Congo
- Morocco

== Venue ==
- Cairo Stadium Indoor Hall 2, Cairo, Egypt

== Pool standing procedure ==
1. Number of matches won
2. Match points
3. Sets ratio
4. Points ratio
5. Result of the last match between the tied teams

Match won 3–0 or 3–1: 3 match points for the winner, 0 match points for the loser
Match won 3–2: 2 match points for the winner, 1 match point for the loser

== Round robin ==
- All times are Egypt Standard Time (UTC+02:00).

| Pos | Team | Pld | W | L | Pts | SW | SL | SR | SPW | SPL | SPR |
|---|---|---|---|---|---|---|---|---|---|---|---|
| 1 | Egypt | 3 | 3 | 0 | 9 | 9 | 1 | 9.000 | 242 | 174 | 1.391 |
| 2 | Cameroon | 3 | 2 | 1 | 6 | 7 | 4 | 1.750 | 256 | 226 | 1.133 |
| 3 | Morocco | 3 | 1 | 2 | 3 | 4 | 7 | 0.571 | 238 | 255 | 0.933 |
| 4 | DR Congo | 3 | 0 | 3 | 0 | 1 | 9 | 0.111 | 167 | 248 | 0.673 |

| Date | Time | | Score | | Set 1 | Set 2 | Set 3 | Set 4 | Set 5 | Total | Report |
|---|---|---|---|---|---|---|---|---|---|---|---|
| 20 Feb | 17:00 | Cameroon | 3–1 | Morocco | 25–20 | 23–25 | 25–17 | 26–24 | | 99–86 | P2 |
| 20 Feb | 21:05 | Egypt | 3–0 | DR Congo | 25–9 | 25–18 | 25–11 | | | 75–38 | P2 |
| 22 Feb | 17:00 | DR Congo | 1–3 | Morocco | 25–22 | 20–25 | 12–25 | 24–26 | | 81–98 | P2 |
| 22 Feb | 20:00 | Egypt | 3–1 | Cameroon | 25–21 | 25–19 | 17–25 | 25–17 | | 92–82 | P2 |
| 24 Feb | 16:00 | DR Congo | 0–3 | Cameroon | 19–25 | 15–25 | 14–25 | | | 48–75 | P2 |
| 24 Feb | 19:00 | Egypt | 3–0 | Morocco | 25–14 | 25–19 | 25–21 | | | 75–54 | P2 |

== Final standing ==
| Rank | Team |
|---|---|
| 1st place, gold medalist(s) | Egypt |
| 2nd place, silver medalist(s) | Cameroon |
| 3rd place, bronze medalist(s) | Morocco |
| 4 | DR Congo |

| Qualified for the 2021 U21 World Championship |

2020 African Champions U21

Egypt
5th title

== Awards ==
- Most valuable player
  (Egypt) Marawan El Safy
- Best spiker
  (Morocco) Driss Mostari
- Best blocker
  (Cameroon) Derrick Deffo
- Best server
  (Egypt) Ahmed Abelazeem Mido
- Best setter
  (Egypt) Anas Shawky
- Best receiver
  (Egypt) Abdelrahman El Hossini
- Best libero
  (Cameroon) Stephanie Mana
