= Tunisian National Military Museum =

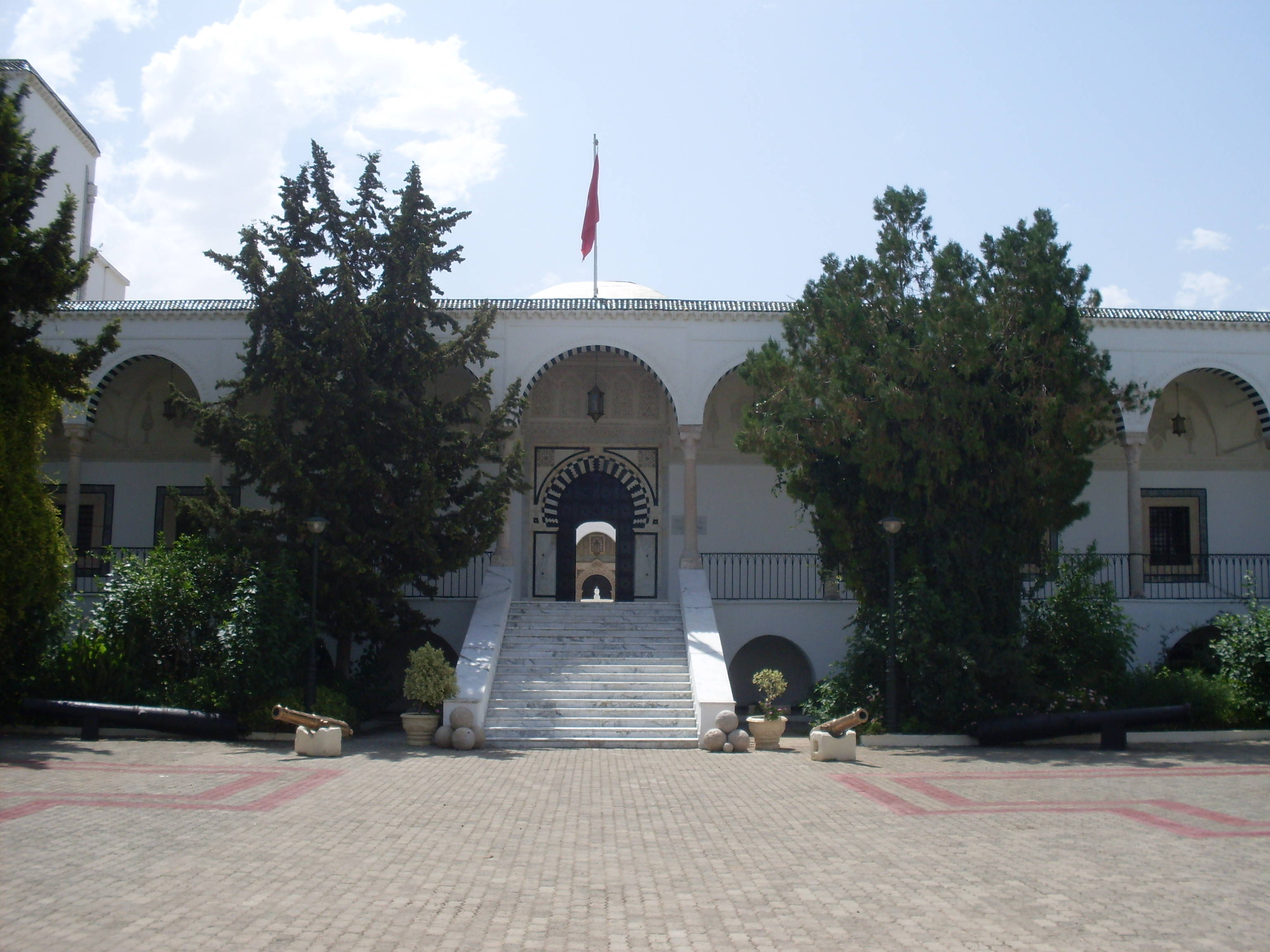
- Established: June 25, 1984; 42 years ago
- Location: Manouba, Tunisia
- Coordinates: 36.811378°N 10.098474°E
- Type: Military History Museum

The Tunisian National Military Museum (Arabic: المتحف الوطني العسكري التونسي ; French: Musée militaire national tunisien) is a museum located in Manouba, north-eastern Tunisia. The museum is dedicated to exhibiting military artifacts used at different times in the history of Tunisia.

== History ==
The building was built in the center of a rose garden in 1793 by Hammouda Bey, for this reason the building is called the Rose Palace. During the Protectorate, the building became a command post. The building was abandoned after the independence of the country. The Ministry of National Defense was responsible for restoring the building and turned it into a museum. Habib Bourguiba was the person who decided to convert the palace into a museum. In 1894, the museum was inaugurated after the 28th anniversary of the creation of the first nucleus of the army, although only soldiers and their families could access the museum. In 1989, the museum was opened to the general public. In May 2015, an exhibition of photographs of monuments of Manouba was held at the museum.

== Collections ==
The museum contains more than 23,000 objects including shields, miniature models of warships and oil paintings. Most of the objects exhibited in the museum are weapons. The museum has rooms specialized in certain part of the country's history, including the Ancient, Medieval, Ottoman, Muradid and Husainid periods. The museum exhibits models of Carthaginian fleets, statues of Roman soldiers as well as vaults decorated with plaster using the naksh-hdîda decoration technique. The museum has a room called "Armed Resistance", which focuses on the French occupation, in this room are artillery, uniforms and newspaper excerpts from that time, there are also photos of fighters. The museum also exhibits photographs of the army during the 2011 Revolution. The museum contains tanks and cannons, as well as military equipment used in the early years of Tunisian Independence. The museum has collections of weapons of the 19th century, also the museum has exhibits on the participation of the Tunisian army allied with the Ottomans during the Crimean War. The museum also has historical documents and manuscripts.
