= 2015 FIVB Volleyball Men's U21 World Championship =

International volleyball competition

2015 Men's U21 World Championship
Tournament details
- Host country: Mexico
- Dates: 11–20 September
- Teams: 16
- Venues: 2 (in 2 host cities)

Final positions
- Champions: Russia (10th title)

Tournament awards
- MVP: (Russia) Pavel Pankov

The 2015 FIVB Volleyball Men's U21 World Championship was the eighteenth edition of the FIVB Volleyball Men's U21 World Championship, which was hosted by Mexico from 11 to 20 September 2015 in the cities of Mexicali and Tijuana.

Russia, won the tournament after defeating Argentina 3-2 in the final match, thus securing the country's tenth title and the third in a row, after winning the editions of 2011 in Brazil and 2013 in Turkey. Pavel Pankov was elected the Most Valuable Player.

== Qualification ==
The FIVB Sports Events Council confirmed a proposal to streamline the number of teams participating in the Age Group World Championships on 14 December 2013.

Means of qualification		Date	Venue	Vacancies	Qualifier
Host country		11 November 2014	(Switzerland) Lausanne	1	Mexico
2014 NORCECA Championship		29 July –3 August 2014	(El Salvador) San Salvador	2	Cuba
2014 NORCECA Championship		29 July –3 August 2014	(El Salvador) San Salvador	2	Canada
2014 South American Championship		27–31 August 2014	(Brazil) Saquarema	2	Brazil
2014 South American Championship		27–31 August 2014	(Brazil) Saquarema	2	Argentina
2014 Asian Championship		17–25 October 2014	(Bahrain) Manama	2	Iran
2014 Asian Championship		17–25 October 2014	(Bahrain) Manama	2	China
2015 African Championship		27 February – 1 March 2015	(Egypt) Cairo	1	Egypt
European Qualifier	Pool G	15–17 May 2015	(Poland) Bełchatów	1	Poland
European Qualifier	Pool H	15–17 May 2015	(Slovenia) Nova Gorica	1	Slovenia
World Ranking		December 2014	(Switzerland) Lausanne	6	Russia
World Ranking		December 2014	(Switzerland) Lausanne	6	Italy
World Ranking		December 2014	(Switzerland) Lausanne	6	France
World Ranking		December 2014	(Switzerland) Lausanne	6	Turkey
World Ranking		December 2014	(Switzerland) Lausanne	6	United States
World Ranking		December 2014	(Switzerland) Lausanne	6	Japan
Total				16	

== Pools composition ==
Teams were seeded in the first two positions of each pool following the Serpentine system according to their FIVB U21 World Ranking as of December 2014. FIVB reserved the right to seed the hosts as head of Pool A regardless of the U21 World Ranking. All teams not seeded were drawn to take other available positions in the remaining lines, following the U21 World Ranking. The draw was held in Tijuana, Mexico on 25 June 2015. Rankings are shown in brackets except the Hosts who ranked 22nd.

Pool A	Pool B	Pool C	Pool D
Mexico (Hosts)	Russia (1)	Brazil (2)	Italy (3)
Turkey (7)	Argentina (6)	Iran (5)	France (4)
Canada (8)	United States (9)	China (10)	Japan (11)
Egypt (26)	Poland (15)	Cuba (13)	Slovenia (18)

== Venues ==
Pool A, B, E, F and Final eight	Pool C, D, G, H and 9th–16th places
Tijuana, Mexico	Mexicali, Mexico
Centro de Alto Rendimiento de Tijuana	Auditorio del Estado
Capacity: 4,000	Capacity: 5,000

== Pool standing procedure ==
1. Number of matches won
2. Match points
3. Sets ratio
4. Points ratio
5. Result of the last match between the tied teams

Match won 3–0 or 3–1: 3 match points for the winner, 0 match points for the loser
Match won 3–2: 2 match points for the winner, 1 match point for the loser

== First round ==
- All times are Pacific Daylight Time (UTC−07:00).

=== Pool A ===
Pos	Team	Pld	W	L	Pts	SW	SL	SR	SPW	SPL	SPR	Qualification
1	Turkey	3	3	0	9	9	1	9.000	247	198	1.247	Pool E or Pool F
2	Canada	3	2	1	5	7	5	1.400	283	254	1.114	Pool E or Pool F
3	Mexico	3	1	2	3	3	6	0.500	181	210	0.862	Pool G or Pool H
4	Egypt	3	0	3	1	2	9	0.222	226	274	0.825	Pool G or Pool H

Date	Time		Score		Set 1	Set 2	Set 3	Set 4	Set 5	Total	Report
11 Sep	12:00	Turkey	3–1	Canada	17–25	25–22	25–22	25–19		92–88	P2 P3
11 Sep	20:00	Mexico	3–0	Egypt	25–17	25–23	25–20			75–60	P2 P3
12 Sep	12:00	Egypt	2–3	Canada	32–30	26–24	19–25	19–25	9–15	105–119	P2 P3
12 Sep	19:00	Mexico	0–3	Turkey	16–25	19–25	14–25			49–75	P2 P3
13 Sep	12:00	Turkey	3–0	Egypt	30–28	25–15	25–18			80–61	P2 P3
13 Sep	19:00	Canada	3–0	Mexico	25–17	25–20	25–20			75–57	P2 P3

=== Pool B ===
Pos	Team	Pld	W	L	Pts	SW	SL	SR	SPW	SPL	SPR	Qualification
1	Russia	3	3	0	9	9	0	MAX	226	178	1.270	Pool E or Pool F
2	Argentina	3	2	1	5	6	6	1.000	269	278	0.968	Pool E or Pool F
3	Poland	3	1	2	3	4	6	0.667	241	230	1.048	Pool G or Pool H
4	United States	3	0	3	1	2	9	0.222	208	258	0.806	Pool G or Pool H

Date	Time		Score		Set 1	Set 2	Set 3	Set 4	Set 5	Total	Report
11 Sep	14:00	Russia	3–0	Poland	25–20	25–23	26–24			76–67	P2 P3
11 Sep	17:00	Argentina	3–2	United States	25–21	25–23	21–25	22–25	15–10	108–104	P2 P3
12 Sep	14:00	Poland	3–0	United States	25–22	25–19	25–14			75–55	P2 P3
12 Sep	17:00	Russia	3–0	Argentina	25–18	25–23	25–21			75–62	P2 P3
13 Sep	14:00	Argentina	3–1	Poland	32–30	16–25	26–24	25–20		99–99	P2 P3
13 Sep	17:00	United States	0–3	Russia	17–25	17–25	15–25			49–75	P2 P3

=== Pool C ===
Pos	Team	Pld	W	L	Pts	SW	SL	SR	SPW	SPL	SPR	Qualification
1	Brazil	3	3	0	9	9	1	9.000	249	197	1.264	Pool E or Pool F
2	China	3	2	1	6	7	4	1.750	262	234	1.120	Pool E or Pool F
3	Iran	3	1	2	3	4	7	0.571	224	247	0.907	Pool G or Pool H
4	Cuba	3	0	3	0	1	9	0.111	186	243	0.765	Pool G or Pool H

Date	Time		Score		Set 1	Set 2	Set 3	Set 4	Set 5	Total	Report
11 Sep	12:00	Brazil	3–0	Cuba	25–21	25–18	25–15			75–54	P2 P3
11 Sep	19:00	Iran	1–3	China	21–25	14–25	25–19	21–25		81–94	P2 P3
12 Sep	12:00	Cuba	0–3	China	20–25	16–25	18–25			54–75	P2 P3
12 Sep	19:00	Brazil	3–0	Iran	25–11	25–18	25–21			75–50	P2 P3
13 Sep	12:00	Iran	3–1	Cuba	18–25	25–17	25–18	25–18		93–78	P2 P3
13 Sep	19:00	China	1–3	Brazil	24–26	22–25	25–23	22–25		93–99	P2 P3

=== Pool D ===
Pos	Team	Pld	W	L	Pts	SW	SL	SR	SPW	SPL	SPR	Qualification
1	Italy	3	3	0	9	9	2	4.500	275	226	1.217	Pool E or Pool F
2	Slovenia	3	2	1	5	7	6	1.167	292	300	0.973	Pool E or Pool F
3	France	3	1	2	4	5	7	0.714	265	282	0.940	Pool G or Pool H
4	Japan	3	0	3	0	3	9	0.333	269	293	0.918	Pool G or Pool H

Date	Time		Score		Set 1	Set 2	Set 3	Set 4	Set 5	Total	Report
11 Sep	14:00	Italy	3–1	Slovenia	22–25	25–21	25–20	25–20		97–86	P2 P3
11 Sep	17:00	France	3–1	Japan	25–23	26–24	22–25	25–21		98–93	P2 P3
12 Sep	14:00	Slovenia	3–1	Japan	17–25	25–23	25–21	25–22		92–91	P2 P3
12 Sep	17:00	Italy	3–0	France	25–13	25–23	25–19			75–55	P2 P3
13 Sep	14:00	France	2–3	Slovenia	22–25	22–25	25–21	25–23	18–20	112–114	P2 P3
13 Sep	17:00	Japan	1–3	Italy	20–25	25–23	28–30	12–25		85–103	P2 P3

== Second round ==
- All times are Pacific Daylight Time (UTC−07:00).

=== Pool E ===
Pos	Team	Pld	W	L	Pts	SW	SL	SR	SPW	SPL	SPR	Qualification
1	Argentina	3	3	0	9	9	0	MAX	233	191	1.220	Semifinals
2	Brazil	3	2	1	5	6	6	1.000	263	255	1.031	Semifinals
3	Turkey	3	1	2	3	5	8	0.625	275	290	0.948	5th–8th semifinals
4	Slovenia	3	0	3	1	3	9	0.333	248	283	0.876	5th–8th semifinals

Date	Time		Score		Set 1	Set 2	Set 3	Set 4	Set 5	Total	Report
15 Sep	12:00	Turkey	3–2	Slovenia	20–25	20–25	26–24	26–24	16–14	108–112	P2 P3
15 Sep	14:00	Argentina	3–0	Brazil	29–27	25–18	25–19			79–64	P2 P3
16 Sep	17:00	Slovenia	1–3	Brazil	20–25	25–21	21–25	9–25		75–96	P2 P3
16 Sep	19:00	Turkey	0–3	Argentina	21–25	22–25	23–25			66–75	P2 P3
17 Sep	12:00	Argentina	3–0	Slovenia	25–18	25–16	29–27			79–61	P2 P3
17 Sep	17:00	Brazil	3–2	Turkey	25–22	25–20	18–25	20–25	15–9	103–101	P2 P3

=== Pool F ===
Pos	Team	Pld	W	L	Pts	SW	SL	SR	SPW	SPL	SPR	Qualification
1	Russia	3	3	0	9	9	1	9.000	251	174	1.443	Semifinals
2	China	3	2	1	6	6	3	2.000	203	187	1.086	Semifinals
3	Italy	3	1	2	3	3	7	0.429	233	249	0.936	5th–8th semifinals
4	Canada	3	0	3	0	2	9	0.222	226	285	0.793	5th–8th semifinals

Date	Time		Score		Set 1	Set 2	Set 3	Set 4	Set 5	Total	Report
15 Sep	17:00	Canada	1–3	Italy	39–37	19–25	19–25	19–25		96–112	P2 P3
15 Sep	19:00	Russia	3–0	China	25–15	25–20	25–23			75–58	P2 P3
16 Sep	12:00	Italy	0–3	China	20–25	17–25	22–25			59–75	P2 P3
16 Sep	14:00	Canada	1–3	Russia	21–25	20–25	25–23	11–25		77–98	P2 P3
17 Sep	14:00	China	3–0	Canada	25–16	25–16	25–21			75–53	P2 P3
17 Sep	19:00	Russia	3–0	Italy	25–20	28–26	25–16			78–62	P2 P3

=== Pool G ===
Pos	Team	Pld	W	L	Pts	SW	SL	SR	SPW	SPL	SPR	Qualification
1	United States	3	3	0	8	9	3	3.000	278	254	1.094	9th–12th semifinals
2	Iran	3	2	1	7	8	4	2.000	276	250	1.104	9th–12th semifinals
3	Japan	3	1	2	3	5	6	0.833	256	238	1.076	13th–16th semifinals
4	Mexico	3	0	3	0	0	9	0.000	157	225	0.698	13th–16th semifinals

Date	Time		Score		Set 1	Set 2	Set 3	Set 4	Set 5	Total	Report
15 Sep	14:00	United States	3–2	Iran	25–19	21–25	25–22	24–26	16–14	111–106	P2 P3
15 Sep	19:00	Mexico	0–3	Japan	20–25	16–25	15–25			51–75	P2 P3
16 Sep	17:00	Japan	1–3	Iran	25–27	25–18	19–25	21–25		90–95	P2 P3
16 Sep	19:00	Mexico	0–3	United States	23–25	17–25	17–25			57–75	P2 P3
17 Sep	12:00	United States	3–1	Japan	25–23	17–25	25–20	25–23		92–91	P2 P3
17 Sep	17:00	Iran	3–0	Mexico	25–19	25–14	25–16			75–49	P2 P3

=== Pool H ===
Pos	Team	Pld	W	L	Pts	SW	SL	SR	SPW	SPL	SPR	Qualification
1	Poland	3	3	0	8	9	4	2.250	312	275	1.135	9th–12th semifinals
2	France	3	2	1	6	7	4	1.750	251	245	1.024	9th–12th semifinals
3	Cuba	3	1	2	4	6	7	0.857	292	290	1.007	13th–16th semifinals
4	Egypt	3	0	3	0	2	9	0.222	225	270	0.833	13th–16th semifinals

Date	Time		Score		Set 1	Set 2	Set 3	Set 4	Set 5	Total	Report
15 Sep	12:00	Poland	3–2	Cuba	25–20	30–32	16–25	25–20	15–12	111–109	P2 P3
15 Sep	17:00	Egypt	0–3	France	15–25	19–25	22–25			56–75	P2 P3
16 Sep	12:00	France	3–1	Cuba	25–23	25–22	19–25	25–16		94–86	P2 P3
16 Sep	15:00	Egypt	1–3	Poland	25–23	21–25	21–25	17–25		84–98	P2 P3
17 Sep	14:00	Cuba	3–1	Egypt	25–18	25–21	22–25	25–21		97–85	P2 P3
17 Sep	17:00	Poland	3–1	France	25–16	25–17	28–30	25–19		103–82	P2 P3

== Final round ==
- All times are Pacific Daylight Time (UTC−07:00).

=== Classification 13th–16th ===
13th–16th semifinals
19 September
Japan	3
Egypt	1
19 September
Cuba	3
Mexico	0

13th place match
20 September
Japan	0
Cuba	3
15th place match
20 September
Egypt	3
Mexico	0

==== 13th–16th semifinals ====
Date	Time		Score		Set 1	Set 2	Set 3	Set 4	Set 5	Total	Report
19 Sep	12:00	Japan	3–1	Egypt	25–18	27–29	25–21	25–20		102–88	P2 P3
19 Sep	14:00	Cuba	3–0	Mexico	25–19	25–23	25–22			75–64	P2 P3

==== 15th place match ====
Date	Time		Score		Set 1	Set 2	Set 3	Set 4	Set 5	Total	Report
20 Sep	10:00	Egypt	3–0	Mexico	27–25	25–19	25–21			77–65	P2 P3

==== 13th place match ====
Date	Time		Score		Set 1	Set 2	Set 3	Set 4	Set 5	Total	Report
20 Sep	12:00	Japan	0–3	Cuba	21–25	19–25	16–25			56–75	P2 P3

=== Classification 9th–12th ===
9th–12th semifinals
19 September
United States	1
France	3
19 September
Poland	3
Iran	1

9th place match
20 September
France	0
Poland	3
11th place match
20 September
United States	3
Iran	2

==== 9th–12th semifinals ====
Date	Time		Score		Set 1	Set 2	Set 3	Set 4	Set 5	Total	Report
19 Sep	17:00	United States	1–3	France	22–25	20–25	25–16	21–25		88–91	P2 P3
19 Sep	19:00	Poland	3–1	Iran	21–25	25–21	25–22	25–19		96–87	P2 P3

==== 11th place match ====
Date	Time		Score		Set 1	Set 2	Set 3	Set 4	Set 5	Total	Report
20 Sep	15:00	United States	3–2	Iran	25–18	25–18	21–25	12–25	15–10	98–96	P2 P3

==== 9th place match ====
Date	Time		Score		Set 1	Set 2	Set 3	Set 4	Set 5	Total	Report
20 Sep	17:00	France	0–3	Poland	20–25	28–30	19–25			67–80	P2 P3

=== Classification 5th–8th ===
5th–8th semifinals
19 September
Canada	0
Turkey	3
19 September
Italy	3
Slovenia	1

5th place match
20 September
Turkey	0
Italy	3
7th place match
20 September
Canada	1
Slovenia	3

==== 5th–8th semifinals ====
Date	Time		Score		Set 1	Set 2	Set 3	Set 4	Set 5	Total	Report
19 Sep	12:00	Canada	0–3	Turkey	23–25	14–25	16–25			53–75	P2 P3
19 Sep	14:00	Italy	3–1	Slovenia	25–20	25–16	19–25	25–20		94–81	P2 P3

==== 7th place match ====
Date	Time		Score		Set 1	Set 2	Set 3	Set 4	Set 5	Total	Report
20 Sep	10:00	Canada	1–3	Slovenia	25–23	18–25	18–25	11–25		72–98	P2 P3

==== 5th place match ====
Date	Time		Score		Set 1	Set 2	Set 3	Set 4	Set 5	Total	Report
20 Sep	12:00	Turkey	0–3	Italy	22–25	17–25	16–25			55–75	P2 P3

=== Final four ===
Semifinals
19 September
Argentina	3
China	0
19 September
Russia	3
Brazil	1

Final
20 September
Argentina	2
Russia	3
3rd place match
20 September
China	3
Brazil	1

==== Semifinals ====
Date	Time		Score		Set 1	Set 2	Set 3	Set 4	Set 5	Total	Report
19 Sep	17:00	Argentina	3–0	China	25–22	26–24	25–14			76–60	P2 P3
19 Sep	19:00	Russia	3–1	Brazil	25–23	25–21	18–25	25–21		93–90	P2 P3

==== 3rd place match ====
Date	Time		Score		Set 1	Set 2	Set 3	Set 4	Set 5	Total	Report
20 Sep	15:00	China	3–1	Brazil	25–19	25–21	27–29	25–21		102–90	P2 P3

==== Final ====
Date	Time		Score		Set 1	Set 2	Set 3	Set 4	Set 5	Total	Report
20 Sep	17:00	Argentina	2–3	Russia	25–20	25–18	16–25	21–25	11–15	98–103	P2 P3

== Final standing ==
Rank	Team
1st place, gold medalist(s)	Russia
2nd place, silver medalist(s)	Argentina
3rd place, bronze medalist(s)	China
4	Brazil
5	Italy
6	Turkey
7	Slovenia
8	Canada
9	Poland
10	France
11	United States
12	Iran
13	Cuba
14	Japan
15	Egypt
16	Mexico

2015 Men's U21 World champions

Russia
10th title

12–man roster
Pavel Pankov (c), Kirill Ursov, Sergei Pirainen, Evgenii Andreev, Aleksandr Melnikov, Maxim Belogortcev, Alexander Goncharov, Roman Zhos, Aleksandr Kimerov, Dmitry Volkov, Mikhail Morov, Denis Bogdan
Head coach
Nikolaev Mikhail

== Awards ==
- Most valuable player
  - Pavel Pankov (RUS)
- Best scorer
  - (Slovenia) Tonček Štern (SLO)
- Best setter
  - Matías Sánchez (ARG)
- Best outside spikers
  - Dmitry Volkov (RUS)
  - Denis Bogdan (RUS)
- Best middle blockers
  - Zhejia Zhang (CHN)
  - Osman Durmaz (TUR)
- Best opposite spiker
  - Caio Olivera (BRA)
- Best libero
  - Santiago Danani (ARG)

== See also ==
- 2015 FIVB Volleyball Women's U20 World Championship
