= 2010 African Volleyball Championship U21 =

Tournament details
- Host country: Libya
- Dates: 2–9 October
- Teams: 8
- Venue: 1 (in 1 host city)

Final positions
- Champions: Tunisia (8th title)

The 2010 African Volleyball Championship U21 was held in Misrata, Libya, from 2 to 9 October 2010. The finalists qualified for the 2011 World Junior Championship.

== Teams ==
- Chad
- Egypt
- Ivory Coast
- Libya
- Morocco
- Rwanda
- South Africa
- Tunisia

== Group stage ==
The draw was held on 1 October.

=== Group A ===
Pos	Team	Pld	W	L	Pts	SW	SL	SR	SPW	SPL	SPR	Qualification
1	Rwanda	3	3	0	6	9	2	4.500	256	212	1.208	Semifinals
2	Morocco	3	2	1	5	8	5	1.600	289	253	1.142	Semifinals
3	Libya	3	1	2	4	5	7	0.714	266	259	1.027	
4	Chad	3	0	3	3	1	9	0.111	158	245	0.645	

Date	Time		Score		Set 1	Set 2	Set 3	Set 4	Set 5	Total	Report
2 Oct	1:55	Rwanda	3–2	Morocco	22–25	25–15	19–25	25-21	15-13	106–65	
2 Oct	1:29	Libya	3–1	Chad	25–13	25–13	20–25	25-17		95–51	
3 Oct	1:04	Chad	0–3	Rwanda	16–25	21–25	16–25			53–75	
3 Oct	2:08	Libya	2–3	Morocco	25–23	19–25	25–23	29-31	12-15	110–71	
4 Oct	0:57	Chad	0–3	Morocco	13–25	10–25	14–25			37–75	
4 Oct	1:07	Rwanda	3–0	Libya	25–23	25–18	25–18			75–59	

=== Group B ===
Pos	Team	Pld	W	L	Pts	SW	SL	SR	SPW	SPL	SPR	Qualification
1	Tunisia	3	3	0	6	9	0	MAX	225	111	2.027	Semifinals
2	Egypt	3	2	1	5	6	3	2.000	212	141	1.504	Semifinals
3	South Africa	3	1	2	4	3	6	0.500	154	186	0.828	
4	Ivory Coast	3	0	3	3	0	9	0.000	72	225	0.320	

Date	Time		Score		Set 1	Set 2	Set 3	Set 4	Set 5	Total	Report
2 Oct	1:05	Egypt	3–0	South Africa	25–16	25–19	25–12			75–47	
2 Oct	0:49	Tunisia	3–0	Ivory Coast	25–4	25–10	25–3			75–17	
3 Oct	0:49	Ivory Coast	0–3	Egypt	7–25	4–23	8–25			19–73	
3 Oct	0:57	South Africa	0–3	Tunisia	8–25	6–25	18–25			32–75	Report
4 Oct	1:05	South Africa	3–0	Ivory Coast	25–8	25–11	25–17			75–36	
4 Oct	1:14	Tunisia	3–0	Egypt	25–17	25–22	25–23			75–62	Report

== Knockout stage ==
=== 5–8th place bracket ===
5th–8th places
6 October, Misrata
South Africa	3
Chad	2
6 October, Misrata
Libya	3
Ivory Coast	0

Fifth place
8 October, Misrata
Libya	3
South Africa	1
Seventh place
8 October, Misrata
Chad	3
Ivory Coast	0

==== Classification 5–8 places ====
Date	Time		Score		Set 1	Set 2	Set 3	Set 4	Set 5	Total	Report
6 Oct	1:45	South Africa	3–2	Chad	25–22	17–25	23–25	25-17	15-11	105–72	
6 Oct	1:02	Libya	3–0	Ivory Coast	25–10	25–11	25–14			75–35	

==== Seventh place match ====
Date	Time		Score		Set 1	Set 2	Set 3	Set 4	Set 5	Total	Report
8 Oct	0:58	Ivory Coast	0–3	Chad	10–25	6–25	12–25			28–75	

==== Fifth place match ====
Date	Time		Score		Set 1	Set 2	Set 3	Set 4	Set 5	Total	Report
8 Oct	1:23	Libya	3–1	South Africa	25–18	25–23	14–25	25-17		89–66	

=== Championship bracket ===
Semifinals
6 October – Misrata
Tunisia	3
Morocco	2
6 October – Misrata
Egypt	3
Rwanda	1

Final
9 October – Misrata
Tunisia	3
Egypt	2
Third place
9 October – Misrata
Rwanda	0
Morocco	3

==== Semifinals ====
Date	Time		Score		Set 1	Set 2	Set 3	Set 4	Set 5	Total	Report
6 Oct	1:50	Tunisia	3–2	Morocco	23–25	25–18	25–20	18–25	15–13	106–101	Report
6 Oct	1:57	Egypt	3–1	Rwanda	25–27	28–26	26–24	25-19		104–77	Report

==== Bronze medal match ====
Date	Time		Score		Set 1	Set 2	Set 3	Set 4	Set 5	Total	Report
9 Oct	1:06	Rwanda	0–3	Morocco	23–25	20–25	22–25			65–75	Report

==== Final ====
Date	Time		Score		Set 1	Set 2	Set 3	Set 4	Set 5	Total	Report
9 Oct	1:50	Tunisia	3–2	Egypt	25–16	22–25	25–27	25-20	15-13	112–68	Report

== Final standing ==
Rank	Team
Gold medal	Tunisia
Silver medal	Egypt
Bronze medal	Morocco
4	Rwanda
5	Libya
6	South Africa
7	Chad
8	Ivory Coast

Qualified for the 2011 Junior World Championship

2010 African Junior champions

Tunisia
Eighth title

Team roster

Bahri Ben Massoud (L), Mahdi Sammoud, Oussama Mrika, Ibrahim Besbes, Racem Siala, Saddem Ben Daoued, Mohamed Ali Ben Othmen Miladi, Saddem Hmissi, Mohamed Arbi Ben Abdallah, Omar Agrebi, Mohamed Ayech, Hatem Obba

Head coach: Mounir Gara
