= Robert Szczerbaniuk =

Polish volleyball player (born 1977)

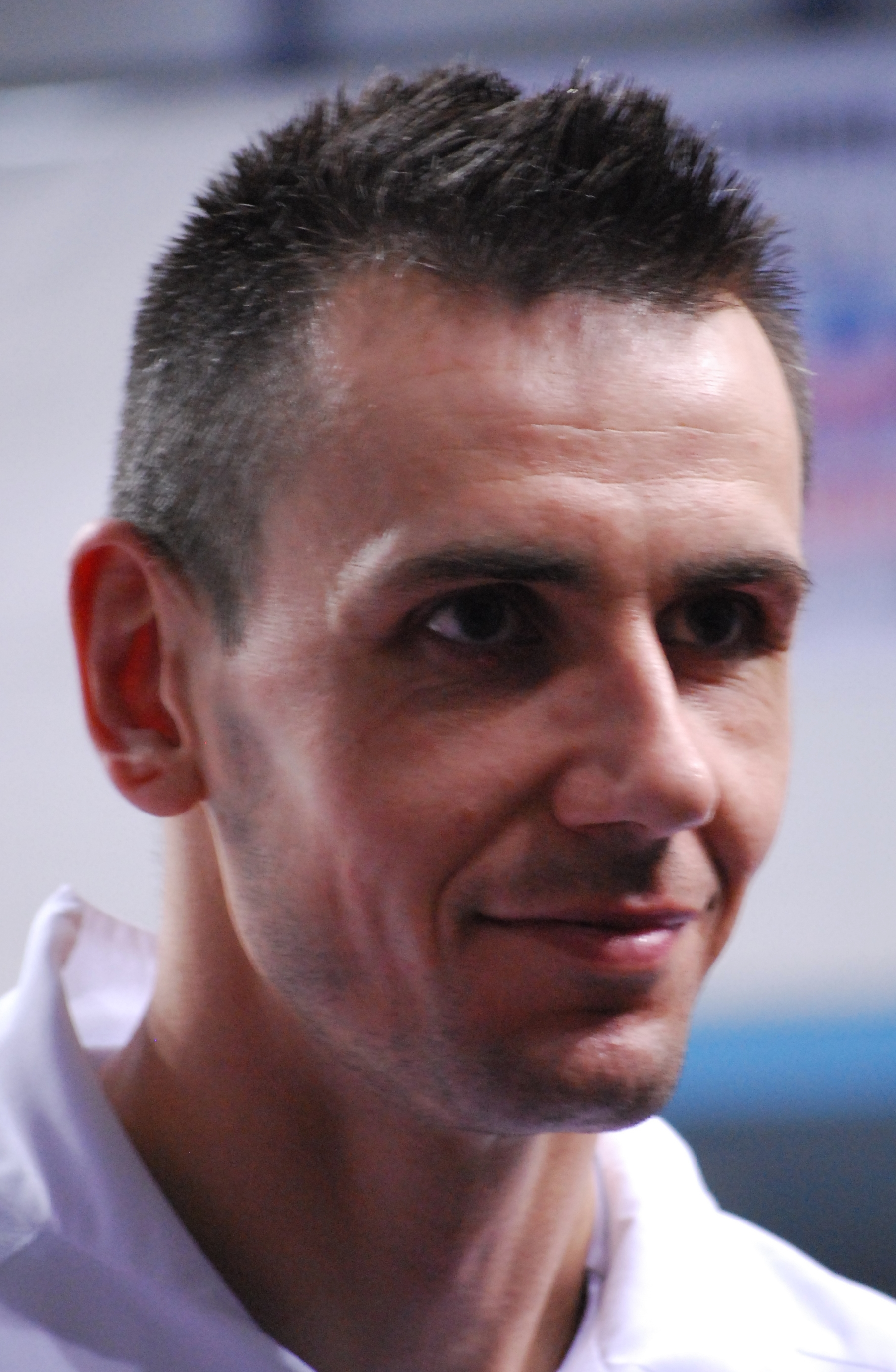

Personal information
- Full name: Robert Szczerbaniuk
- Nickname: Benek
- Nationality: Polish
- Born: May 29, 1977 (age 49); Wrocław, Poland
- Height: 1.99 m (6 ft 6 in)
- Weight: 89 kg (196 lb)
- Spike: 350 cm (140 in)
- Block: 327 cm (129 in)

Volleyball information
- Position: Middle blocker
- Current club: VK Prievidza

Career
Years	Teams
1994–1995; 1995–1997; 1997–1998; 1998–2004; 2004–2006; 2006–2008; 2008–2010; 2010–2011; 2011–2012; 2012–2014; 2014–2016; 2016–	Moto Jelcz Oława; Chemik Kędzierzyn-Koźle; SMS Rzeszów; Chełmiec Wałbrzych; Mostostal Kędzierzyn-Koźle; KPS Skra Bełchatów; AZS Częstochowa; ZAKSA Kędzierzyn-Koźle; Fart Kielce; Cuprum Lubin; Aon hotVolleys Vienna; ČEZ Karlovarsko; VK Prievidza

National team
1998–2004	Poland (120)
- Last updated: 13 April 2017

Robert Szczerbaniuk (born 29 May 1977) is a Polish volleyball player, a member of Poland men's national volleyball team in 1998–2004 and Slovak club VK Prievidza, a participant of the 2004 Olympic Games, six-time Polish Champion (2000, 2001, 2002, 2003, 2005, 2006).

== Personal life ==
He is married to Violetta. They have a son Nataniel and a daughter Nina.

== Career ==
In 2014 he signed a contract with Czech club ČEZ Karlovarsko. After season he moved to Slovak team VK Prievidza.

== Sporting achievements ==
=== Clubs ===
==== CEV Champions League ====
- 2002/2003 - with Mostostal SA Kędzierzyn-Koźle

=== National championship ===
- 1999/2000 Polish Cup, with Mostostal SA Kędzierzyn-Koźle
- 1999/2000 Polish Championship, with Mostostal SA Kędzierzyn-Koźle
- 2000/2001 Polish Cup, with Mostostal SA Kędzierzyn-Koźle
- 2000/2001 Polish Championship, with Mostostal SA Kędzierzyn-Koźle
- 2001/2002 Polish Cup, with Mostostal SA Kędzierzyn-Koźle
- 2001/2002 Polish Championship, with Mostostal SA Kędzierzyn-Koźle
- 2002/2003 Polish Championship, with Mostostal SA Kędzierzyn-Koźle
- 2004/2005 Polish Cup, with KPS Skra Bełchatów
- 2004/2005 Polish Championship, with KPS Skra Bełchatów
- 2005/2006 Polish Cup, with BOT Skra Bełchatów
- 2005/2006 Polish Championship, with BOT Skra Bełchatów
- 2007/2008 Polish Cup, with AZS Częstochowa
- 2007/2008 Polish Championship, with AZS Częstochowa
- 2013/2014 Austrian Championship, with Aon hotVolleys Vienna
- 2014/2015 Czech Championship, with ČEZ Karlovarsko

=== National team ===
- 1996 CEV U21 European Championship
- 1997 FIVB U21 World Championship
