= Krzysztof Ignaczak =

Polish volleyball player

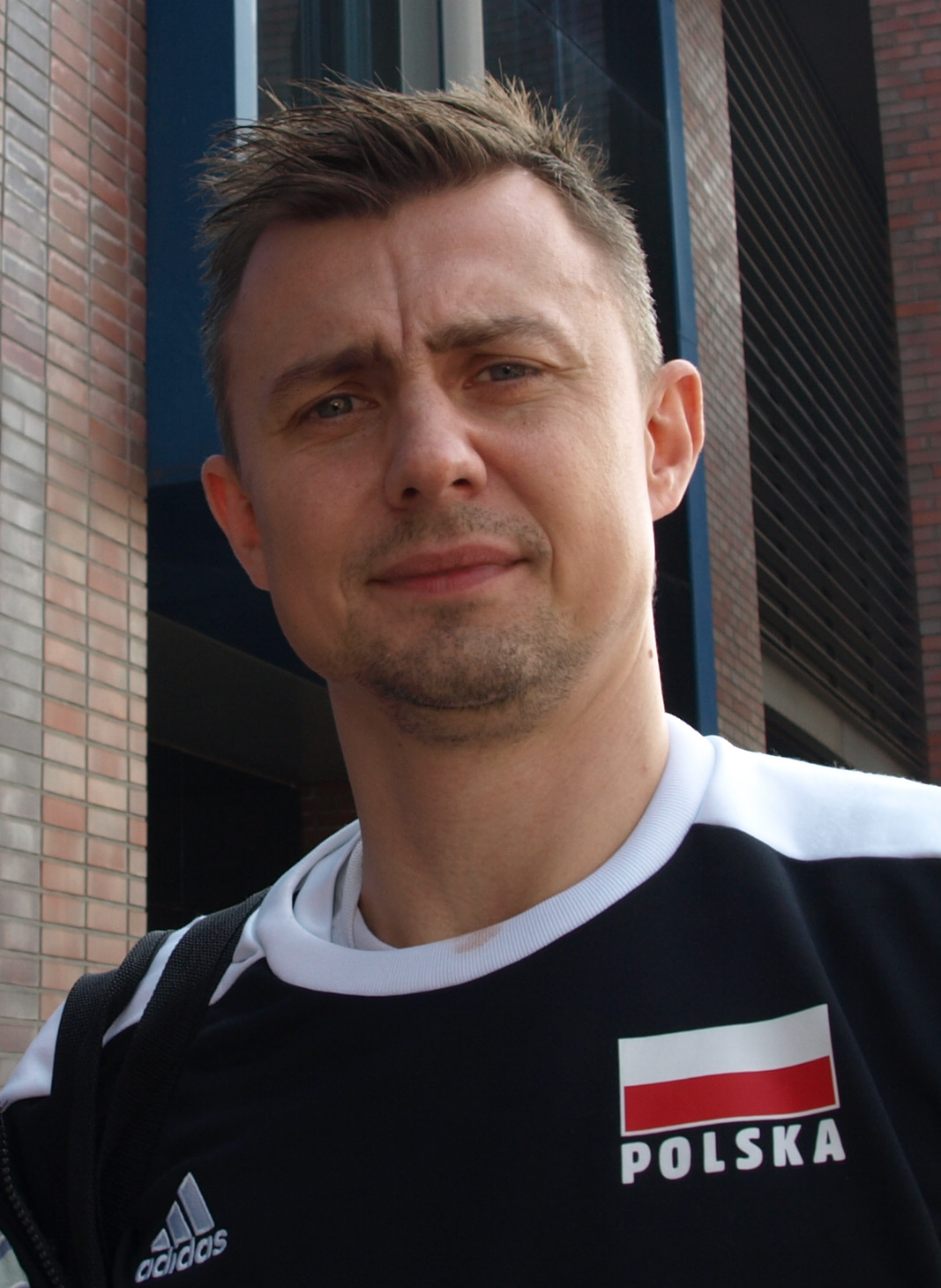

Personal information
- Nickname: Igła
- Born: 15 May 1978 (age 48); Wałbrzych, Poland
- Height: 1.88 m (6 ft 2 in)

Volleyball information
- Position: Libero

Career
Years	Teams
1997–1998; 1998–2000; 2000–2003; 2003–2007; 2007–2016; 2017	Chełmiec Wałbrzych; Płomień Sosnowiec; AZS Częstochowa; Skra Bełchatów; Asseco Resovia; IBB Polonia London

National team
1998–2014	Poland (321)
Honours
Men's volleyball
Representing Poland
FIVB World Championship
Gold medal – first place	2014 Poland
FIVB World Cup
Silver medal – second place	2011 Japan
FIVB World League
Gold medal – first place	2012 Sofia
Bronze medal – third place	2011 Gdańsk
CEV European Championship
Gold medal – first place	2009 Turkey
Bronze medal – third place	2011 Austria/Czech Republic

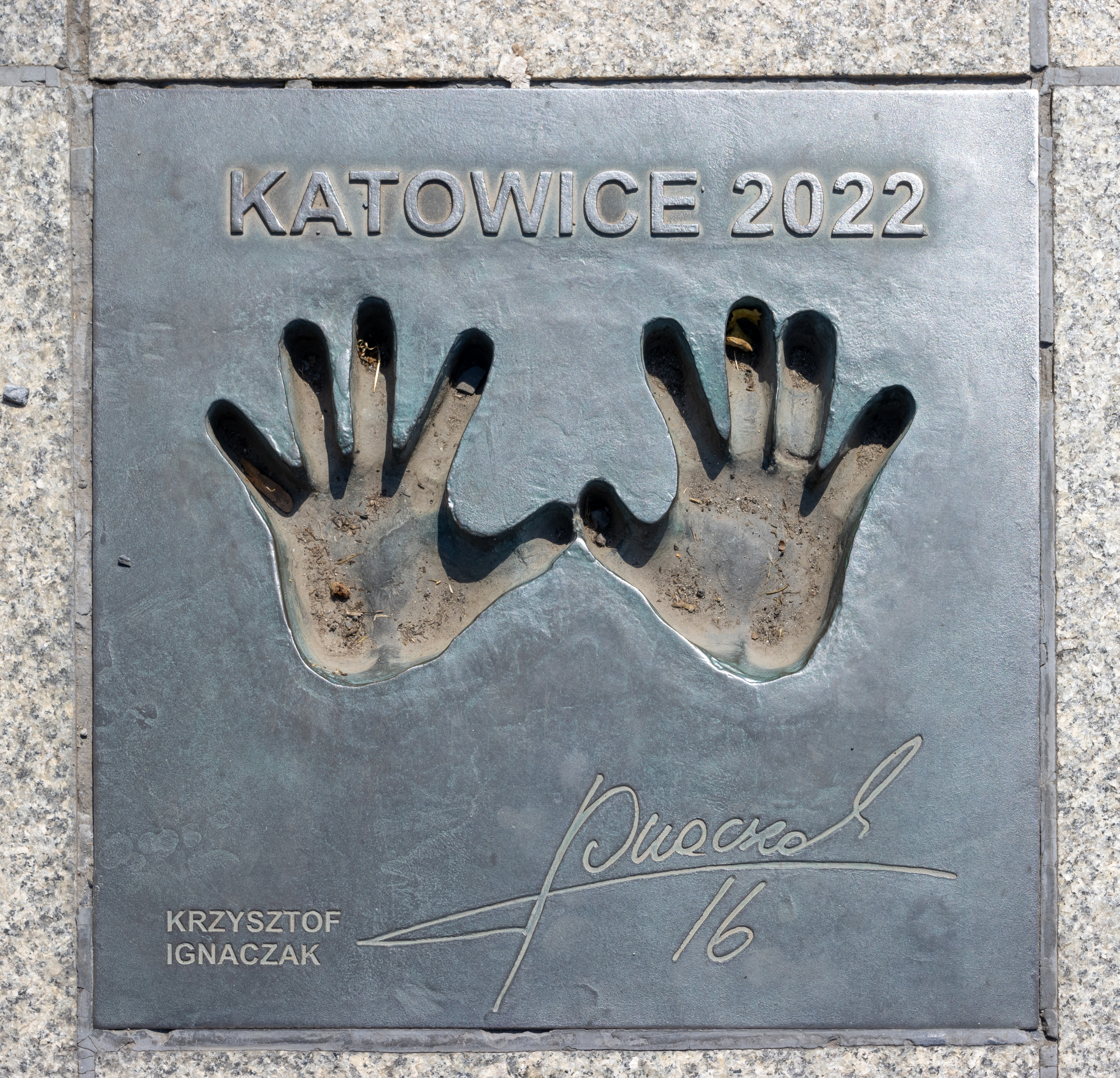
Hand prints and signature at the Avenue of Volleyball Stars, Katowice

Krzysztof Ignaczak (born 15 May 1978) is a Polish former professional volleyball player. He was a member of the Poland national team from 1998 to 2014, a participant in 3 Olympic Games (Athens 2004, Beijing 2008, London 2012), the 2014 World Champion, 2012 World League winner, and the 2009 European Champion.

== Personal life ==
Krzysztof Ignaczak was born in Wałbrzych, Poland. He is married to Iwona. They have two children: a son, Sebastian, and a daughter, Dominika (who was born after the European Championship 2009). His best friend was volleyball player Arkadiusz Gołaś, who died in a tragic car accident in 2005. Since then Ignaczak played with his shirt number – 16.

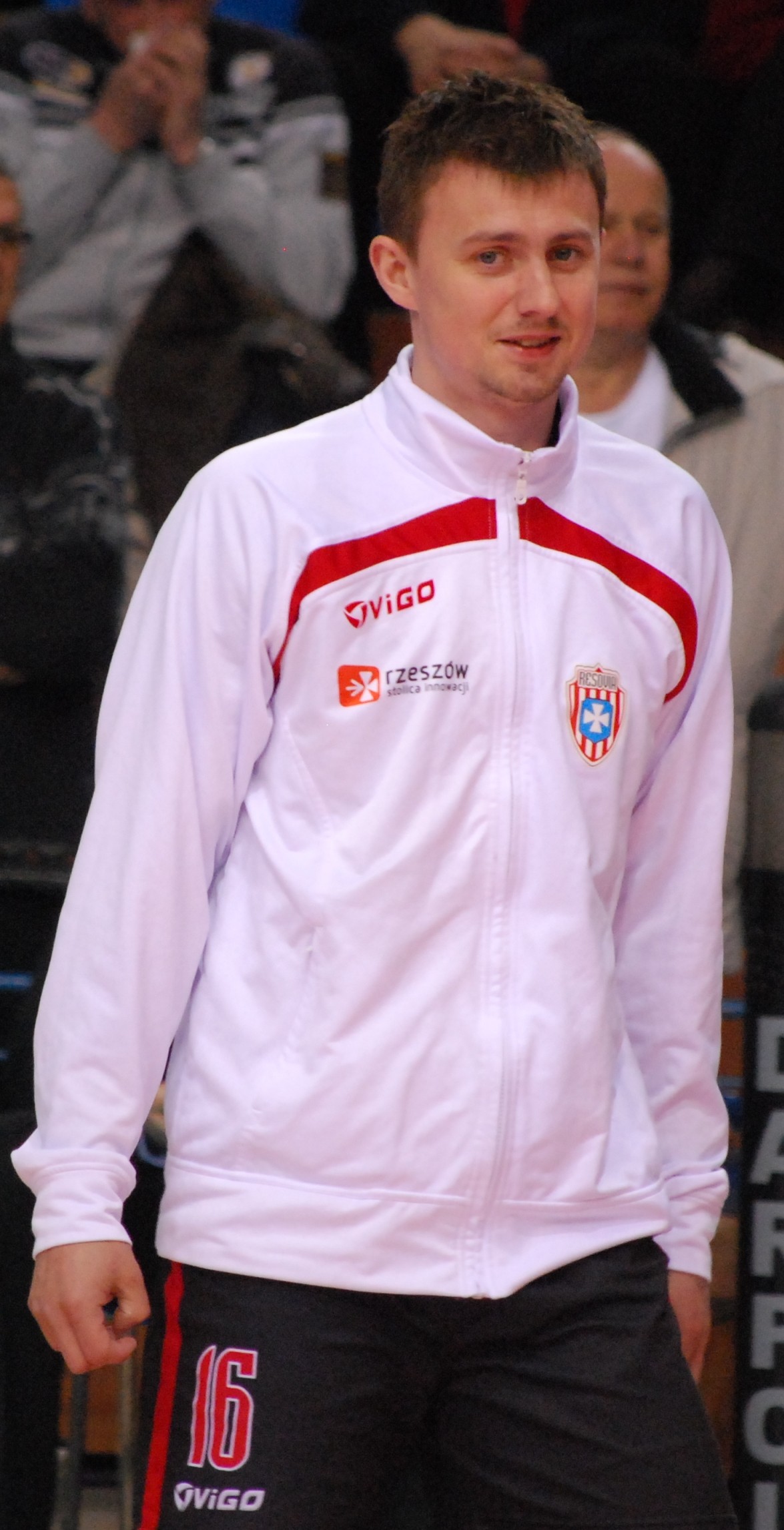
Ignaczak before the match on 23 April 2010.

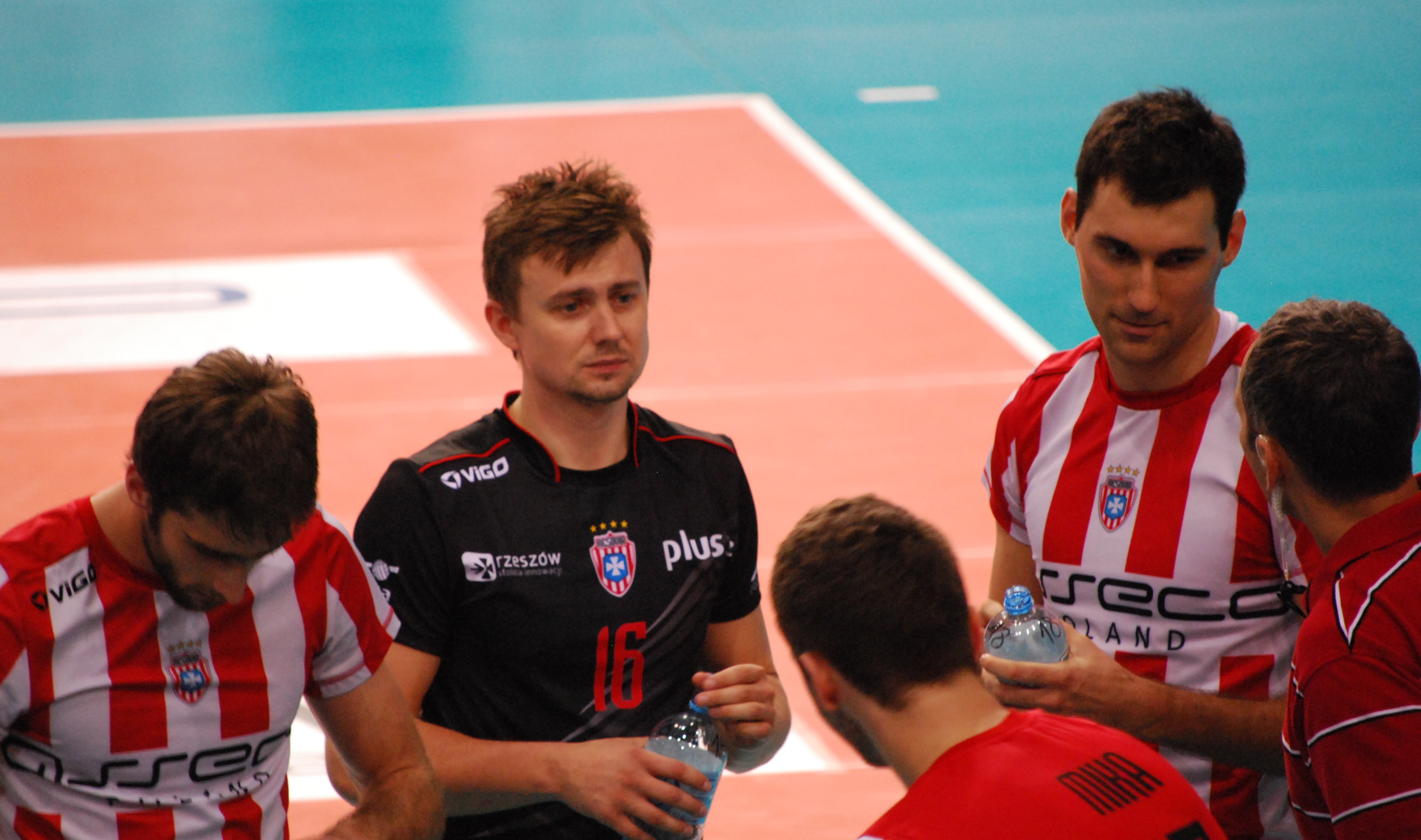
Krzysztof Ignaczak as the Asseco Resovia Rzeszów player on 25 September 2011.

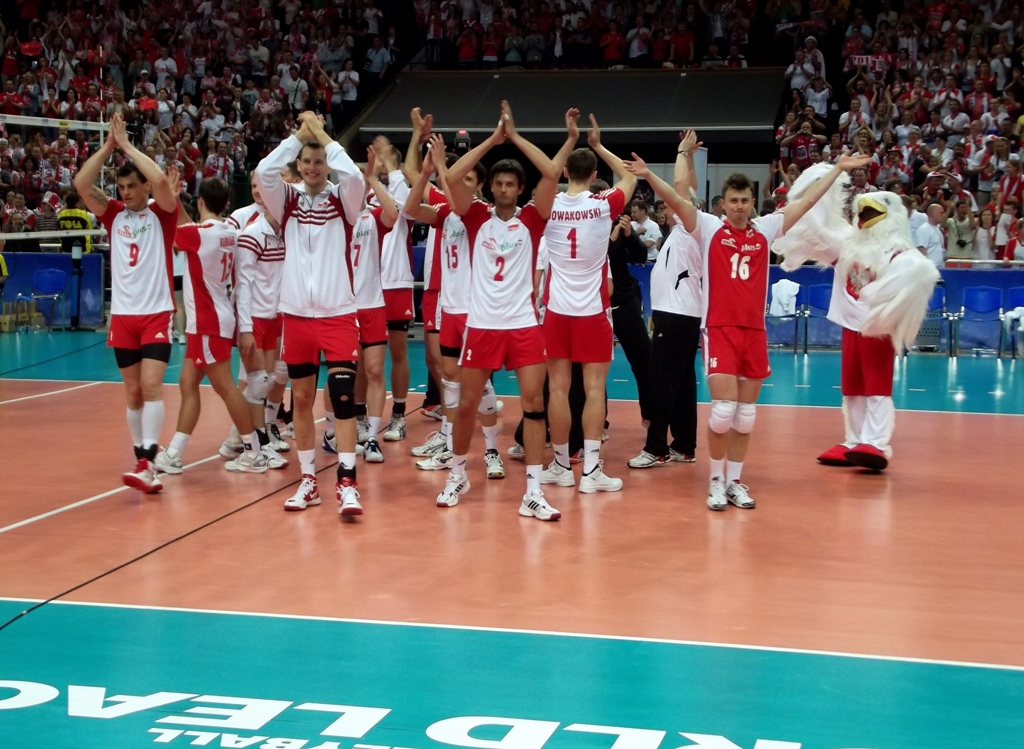
After winning match at Spodek in Katowice (World League 2012). In the foreground from left: Zbigniew Bartman #9, Bartosz Kurek #6, Michał Winiarski #2 and Krzysztof Ignaczak #16.

== Career ==
=== Club ===
With BOT Skra Bełchatów he achieved three titles of Polish Champion and won Polish Cup three times.

In 2012 after seven-year domination of PGE Skra Bełchatów, he won with Asseco Resovia Rzeszów title of Polish Champion. In next year his team and he replied this success and gained second title of Polish Champions 2013.). In season 2013/2014 won Polish SuperCup 2013 and Asseco Resovia Rzeszów, including Ignaczak, lost with PGE Skra Bełchatów in the final of Polish Championship and gained silver medal. On 29 March 2015 his team lost in final of 2014–15 CEV Champions League and achieved silver medal. In April 2015 Ignaczak won third title of Polish Champion with Asseco Resovia and sixth title in career. On 21 September 2016 Ignaczak ended up his sporting career and announced it on media.

Despite previously having announced the end of his sporting career, he decided to sign a contract for the rest of the season with the team IBB Polonia London in the English volleyball league on 10 March 2017. His presence, as current World Champion, at the club serves to promote volleyball in Great Britain and in the world.

=== National team ===
Krzysztof was in the Polish squad when the Polish national team won the gold medal at the European Championship 2009. On 14 September 2009 he was awarded the Order of Polonia Restituta. The Order was conferred on the following day by the Prime Minister of Poland, Donald Tusk. In 2011 he gained three medals with the Polish team – silver at the World Cup, bronze at the European Championship and bronze at the World League in Gdańsk, Poland, where he also won an award for Best Libero. On 8 July 2012 he won a gold medal at the World League 2012 in Sofia, Bulgaria. On 21 September 2014 the Polish national team, including Ignaczak, won the title of World Champion 2014. On 27 October 2014 he received a state award granted by the Polish President Bronisław Komorowski – Officer's Cross of Polonia Restituta for outstanding sports achievements and worldwide promotion of Poland. After the World Championship, he announced he is retiring from his career in the national team.

== Honours ==
=== Club ===
- CEV Champions League
  - 2014–15 – with Asseco Resovia
- CEV Cup
  - 2011–12 – with Asseco Resovia
- Domestic
  - 2004–05 Polish Cup, with KPS Skra Bełchatów
  - 2004–05 Polish Championship, with KPS Skra Bełchatów
  - 2005–06 Polish Cup, with BOT Skra Bełchatów
  - 2005–06 Polish Championship, with BOT Skra Bełchatów
  - 2006–07 Polish Cup, with BOT Skra Bełchatów
  - 2006–07 Polish Championship, with BOT Skra Bełchatów
  - 2011–12 Polish Championship, with Asseco Resovia
  - 2012–13 Polish Championship, with Asseco Resovia
  - 2013–14 Polish SuperCup, with Asseco Resovia
  - 2014–15 Polish Championship, with Asseco Resovia
  - 2016–17 English Cup, with IBB Polonia London
  - 2016–17 English Championship, with IBB Polonia London

=== Youth national team ===
- 1996 CEV U20 European Championship
- 1997 FIVB U21 World Championship

=== Individual awards ===
- 2010: Polish Cup – Best receiver
- 2011: FIVB World League – Best libero
- 2012: FIVB World League – Best libero
- 2012: Olympic Games – Best receiver
- 2012: Polish Cup – Best defender
- 2015: Polish Cup – Best defender

=== State awards ===
- 2009: Knight's Cross of Polonia Restituta
- 2014: Officer's Cross of Polonia Restituta
