= Robert Milczarek =

Polish volleyball player

Personal information
- Nationality: Polish
- Born: 28 November 1983 (age 42); Tomaszow Mazowiecki, Poland
- Height: 1.88 m (6 ft 2 in)
- Weight: 78 kg (172 lb)

Volleyball information
- Position: Outside hitter / Libero

Career
Years	Teams
2003–2008; 2008–2010; 2010–2011; 2011–2012; 2012–2013; 2013–2014; 2014–2015; 2015–2023	Skra Bełchatów; AZS Politechnika Warszawska; Siatkarz Wieluń; Skra Bełchatów; Effector Kielce; Trefl Gdańsk; MKS Będzin; Skra Bełchatów

National team
2005	Poland

Robert Milczarek (born 28 November 1983) is a Polish former professional volleyball player. He was a member of the Poland national team in 2005, and played most of his career for Skra Bełchatów in the Polish PlusLiga.

== Career ==
=== Club ===
Milczarek spent the 2013–14 season playing for Lotos Trefl Gdańsk. In 2014 he moved to MKS Będzin where he played as a libero. On 5 June 2015 for the third time in his career he came back to Skra Bełchatów. On 7 February 2016, he won the Polish Cup after beating ZAKSA Kędzierzyn-Koźle in the final. In April 2016 he won a bronze medal of the Polish Championship.

== Honours ==
=== Club ===
- CEV Champions League
  - 2011–12 – with PGE Skra Bełchatów
- Domestic
  - 2004–05 Polish Cup, with Skra Bełchatów
  - 2004–05 Polish Championship, with Skra Bełchatów
  - 2005–06 Polish Cup, with BOT Skra Bełchatów
  - 2005–06 Polish Championship, with BOT Skra Bełchatów
  - 2006–07 Polish Cup, with BOT Skra Bełchatów
  - 2006–07 Polish Championship, with BOT Skra Bełchatów
  - 2007–08 Polish Championship, with PGE Skra Bełchatów
  - 2011–12 Polish SuperCup, with PGE Skra Bełchatów
  - 2011–12 Polish Cup, with PGE Skra Bełchatów
  - 2015–16 Polish Cup, with PGE Skra Bełchatów
  - 2017–18 Polish SuperCup, with PGE Skra Bełchatów
  - 2017–18 Polish Championship, with PGE Skra Bełchatów
  - 2018–19 Polish SuperCup, with PGE Skra Bełchatów

=== Individual awards ===
- 2017: Polish Cup – Best defender
