= Krzysztof Gierczyński =

Polish volleyball player (born 1976)

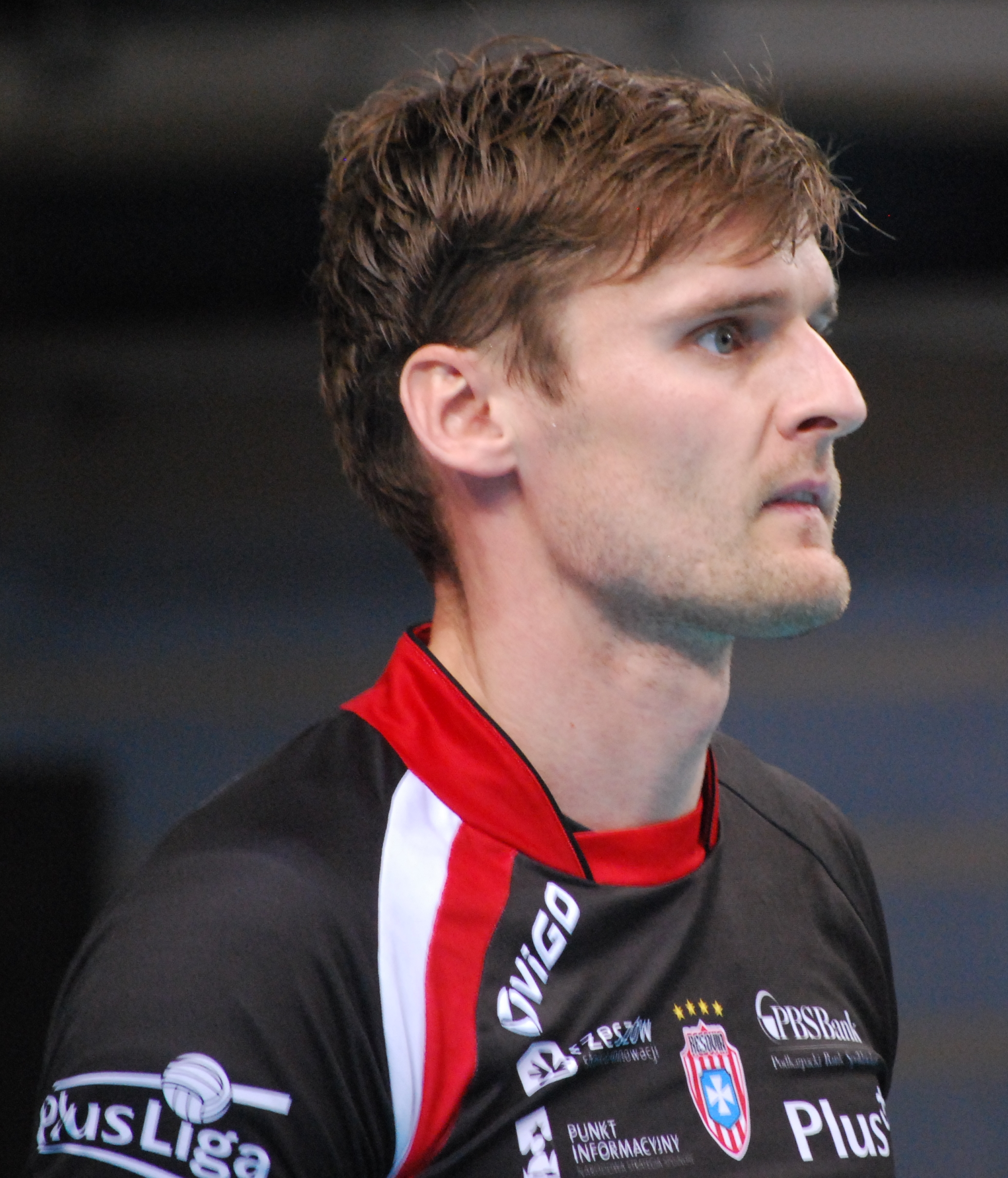

Personal information
- Full name: Krzysztof Gierczyński
- Nationality: Polish
- Born: January 23, 1976 (age 50); Gubin, Poland
- Height: 1.93 m (6 ft 4 in)
- Weight: 87 kg (192 lb)
- Spike: 335 cm (132 in)
- Block: 320 cm (130 in)

Volleyball information
- Position: Outside hitter
- Number: 2

Career
Years	Teams
1996–2002; 2002–2008; 2008–2010; 2010–2012; 2012–2015	Morze Bałtyk Szczecin; AZS Częstochowa; Asseco Resovia Rzeszów; AZS Częstochowa; Jastrzębski Węgiel

National team
1997–2008	Poland (57)
- Last updated: 6 February 2017

Krzysztof Gierczyński (born 23 January 1976) is a former Polish volleyball player, a member of Poland men's national volleyball team in 1997–2008, a participant of the Olympic Games Beijing 2008.

== Career ==
=== Clubs ===
In 2012 moved to Jastrzębski Węgiel. In season 2012/3013 won bronze medal of Polish Championship. In 2013/2014 the club advanced to the Final Four of the Champions League in Ankara and after defeating VC Zenit Kazan won the bronze medal. His team beat ZAKSA Kędzierzyn-Koźle in last matches in the fight for a medal. Jastrzębski Węgiel ended season with second bronze, this time of Polish Championship. On June 25, 2015, he ended up his sports career.

== Sporting achievements ==
=== Clubs ===
==== CEV Champions League ====
- 2013/2014 - with Jastrzębski Węgiel

==== Challenge Cup ====
- 2011/2012 - with AZS Częstochowa

==== National championships ====
- 1996/1997 Polish Championship, with Morze Bałtyk Szczecin
- 1997/1998 Polish Championship, with Morze Bałtyk Szczecin
- 2002/2003 Polish Championship, with AZS Częstochowa
- 2003/2004 Polish Championship, with AZS Częstochowa
- 2004/2005 Polish Championship, with AZS Częstochowa
- 2007/2008 Polish Cup, with AZS Częstochowa
- 2007/2008 Polish Championship, with AZS Częstochowa
- 2008/2009 Polish Championship, with Asseco Resovia Rzeszów
- 2009/2010 Polish Championship, with Asseco Resovia Rzeszów
- 2012/2013 Polish Championship, with Jastrzębski Węgiel
- 2013/2014 Polish Championship, with Jastrzębski Węgiel
