= Krzysztof Stelmach =

Polish volleyball player and coach

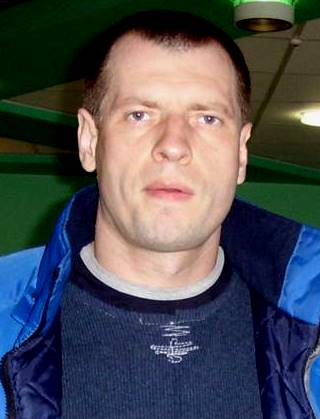

Personal information
- Born: 11 November 1967 (age 58); Świebodzice, Poland
- Height: 1.98 m (6 ft 6 in)

Coaching information
- Current team: Skra Bełchatów
Previous teams coached
| Years | Teams |
|---|---|
| 2008–2012; 2013–2014; 2015–2016; 2016–2017; 2017–2018; 2018–2021; 2022; 2023–2024; 2025– | ZAKSA Kędzierzyn-Koźle; AZS Olsztyn; BBTS Bielsko-Biała; Skra Bełchatów (AC); AZS Częstochowa; Stal Nysa; Gwardia Wrocław; Anioły Toruń; Skra Bełchatów |

Volleyball information
- Position: Outside hitter

Career
| Years | Teams |
|---|---|
| 1986–1991; 1991–1992; 1992–1993; 1993–1994; 1994–1995; 1995–1999; 1999–2003; 2003–2005; 2005–2008 | AZS Częstochowa; Piemonte Volley; Volley Reggio Emilia; Volley Olimpia Sant'Antioco; Piemonte Volley; Pallavolo Padova; Pallavolo Falconara; Pallavolo Padova; Skra Bełchatów |

National team
| 1987–1997 | Poland (274) |

Krzysztof Stelmach (born 11 November 1967) is a Polish professional volleyball coach and former player. He was a member of the Poland national team from 1987 to 1997, and a participant in the Olympic Games Atlanta 1996. He serves as head coach for PGE Skra Bełchatów.

== Personal life ==
He has a younger brother, Andrzej, who is a former volleyball player and coach. His nephew, Kacper was also a professional volleyball player.

== Career as coach ==
During the 2015–16 PlusLiga season he served as head coach for BBTS Bielsko-Biała. In 2016, he became Philippe Blain's assistant in PGE Skra Bełchatów.

== Honours ==
=== Club ===
- Domestic
  - 1989–90 Polish Championship, with AZS Częstochowa
  - 2005–06 Polish Cup, with BOT Skra Bełchatów
  - 2005–06 Polish Championship, with BOT Skra Bełchatów
  - 2006–07 Polish Cup, with BOT Skra Bełchatów
  - 2006–07 Polish Championship, with BOT Skra Bełchatów
  - 2007–08 Polish Championship, with PGE Skra Bełchatów

=== Universiade ===
- 1991 Summer Universiade
- 1993 Summer Universiade

=== Individual awards ===
- 2006: Polish Cup – Most valuable player
