= Arkadiusz Gołaś =

Polish volleyball player (1981–2005)

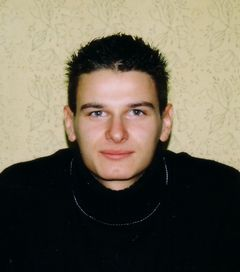

Personal information
- Nationality: (Poland) Polish
- Born: 10 May 1981 Przasnysz, Poland
- Died: 16 September 2005 (aged 24) Griffen, Austria
- Home town: Ostrołęka, Poland
- Height: 2.01 m (6 ft 7 in)

Volleyball information
- Position: Middle blocker

Career
- Years: Team
- 2000–2004 2004–2005 2005: (Poland) AZS Częstochowa (Italy) Edilbasso&Partners Padova (Italy) Volley Lube

National team
- Years: Team
- 2001–2005: Poland (141)

Arkadiusz Gołaś (10 May 1981 – 16 September 2005) was a Polish volleyball player, member of the Poland men's national volleyball team in 2001–2005, participant of the Olympic Games (Athens 2004).

== Personal life ==
He married Agnieszka (née Dziewońska) on 21 July 2005. His best man was another volleyball player, his best friend Krzysztof Ignaczak. On 16 September 2005, Arkadiusz died in Griffen, Austria near Klagenfurt in Austria on the A2 motorway when the car he was riding in struck a concrete wall. His wife, Agnieszka, who was driving, survived. They were on their way to Macerata, where Arkadiusz was due to begin playing his first season at the club Lube Banca Macerata. His last match with the Polish national team was on 8 September 2005, when Poland beat Portugal (3–0). His funeral took place on 22 September 2005 in Ostrołęka.

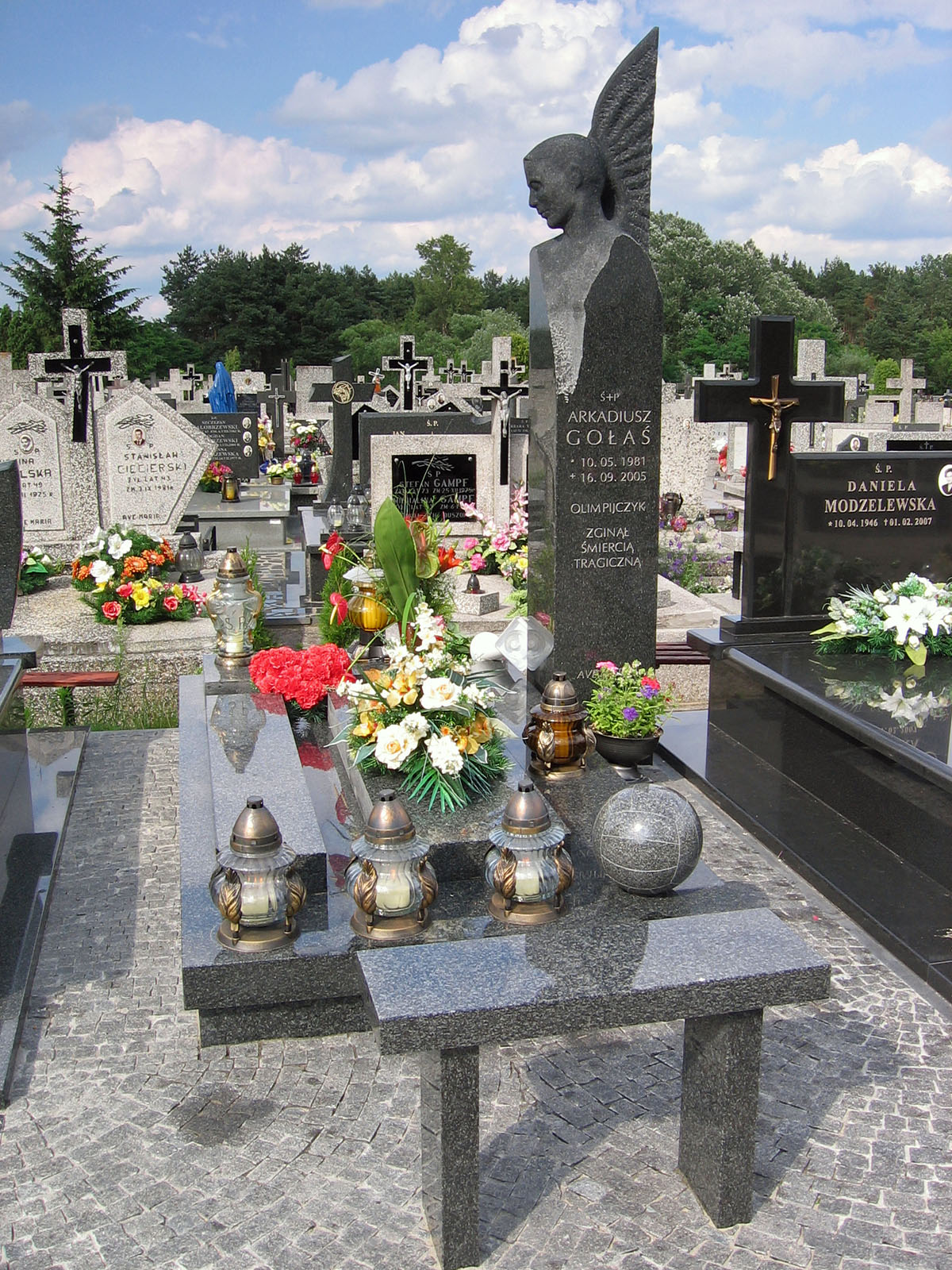
The grave of Arkadiusz Gołaś in the cemetery in Ostrołęka.

== Sports achievements ==
=== Clubs ===
==== National championships ====
- 2000/2001 Polish Championship, with AZS Częstochowa
- 2001/2002 Polish Championship, with AZS Częstochowa
- 2002/2003 Polish Championship, with AZS Częstochowa
- 2003/2004 Polish Championship, with AZS Częstochowa

=== National team ===
- 1999 FIVB U19 World Championship

=== State awards ===
- 2006 Gold Cross of Merit (posthumously)

== Memory ==
- After his death, his best friend from the Polish national team - Krzysztof Ignaczak took over wearing his shirt, bearing number 16, to honor his memory.
- The silver medal won by the Polish national team at the World Championship 2006 was dedicated to him. At the medal ceremony, all Polish players were wearing shirts with his surname and number (16). On 6 December 2006, he was posthumously awarded Gold Cross of Merit by the Polish President Lech Kaczyński for outstanding sports achievements.
- A sport hall in Ostrołęka has been named after him. Since 2006, it has been the venue for the annual Memorial of Arkadiusz Gołaś.
- Sebastian Świderski, who was a player in Italian club Lube Banca Macerata in 2007–2010 played with Arkadiusz's number 16 on his shirt.
- In 2009, the son of Mariusz Wlazły was named after him.
- In 2013–2015, the Polish volleyball player – Bartosz Kurek has been playing with Gołaś's number 16 on his shirt.
- After gaining the title of World Champion 2014, Mariusz Wlazły dedicated his medal to him.
