= Andrzej Stelmach =

Polish volleyball player (born 1972)

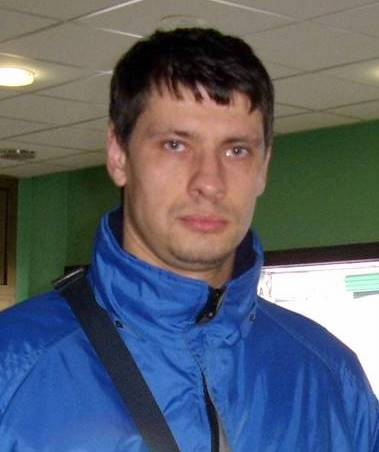

Personal information
- Full name: Andrzej Stelmach
- Nickname: Gruby
- Nationality: Polish
- Born: August 15, 1972 (age 54); Strzegom, Poland
- Height: 2.00 m (6 ft 7 in)
- Spike: 336 cm (132 in)
- Block: 318 cm (125 in)

Coaching information
- Current team: KU AZS Politechnika Śląska
Previous teams coached
Years	Teams
2013–2014; 2015–2016; 2016–	MKS Banimex Będzin (2nd); BBTS Bielsko-Biała (2nd); KU AZS Politechnika Śląska

Volleyball information
- Position: Setter

Career
Years	Teams
1989–1990; 1990–1997; 1997–1999; 1999–2000; 2000–2001; 2001–2002; 2002–2003; 2003–2006; 2006–2009; 2009–2011; 2011–2012; 2012–2013; 2013–2014	SKS Strzegom; Chełmiec Wałbrzych; AZS Częstochowa; Pallavolo Padova; Alpitour Cuneo; Yahoo! Italia Ferrara; AZS Częstochowa; Płomień Sosnowiec; Skra Bełchatów; AZS Częstochowa; Siatkarz Wieluń; AZS Olsztyn; AZS Częstochowa; MKS Banimex Będzin

National team
1990–2005	Poland (306)
- Last updated: 14 April 2017

Andrzej Stelmach (born 15 August 1972) is a Polish former volleyball player, a member of Poland men's national volleyball team in 1990–2005 and head coach of Polish female club KU AZS Politechnika Śląska, a participant of the Olympic Games (Atlanta 1996, Athens 2004), six-time Polish Champion (1993, 1994, 1995, 1997, 2005, 2006).

== Personal life ==
He has brother Krzysztof, who is former volleyball player and coach. He has a son Kacper (born 1997) who also is professional volleyball player in PlusLiga.

== Career as coach ==
In season 2015/16 he was coach of BBTS Bielsko-Biała. In 2016 he went to Polish female club KU AZS Politechnika Śląska in 1st Polish League.

== Sporting achievements ==
=== Clubs ===
==== CEV Cup Winner's Cup ====
- 2000, with Pallavolo Padova

==== National championships ====
- 1990/1991 Polish Championship, with AZS Częstochowa
- 1991/1992 Polish Championship, with AZS Częstochowa
- 1992/1993 Polish Championship, with AZS Częstochowa
- 1993/1994 Polish Championship, with AZS Częstochowa
- 1994/1995 Polish Championship, with AZS Częstochowa
- 1995/1996 Polish Championship, with AZS Częstochowa
- 1996/1997 Polish Championship, with AZS Częstochowa
- 1998/1999 Italian SuperCup, with Pallavolo Padova
- 2004/2005 Polish Cup, with Skra Bełchatów
- 2004/2005 Polish Championship, with Skra Bełchatów
- 2005/2006 Polish Cup, with Skra Bełchatów
- 2005/2006 Polish Championship, with Skra Bełchatów
- 2007/2008 Polish Championship, with AZS Częstochowa
