= Sebastian Świderski =

Polish volleyball player & coach (born 1977)

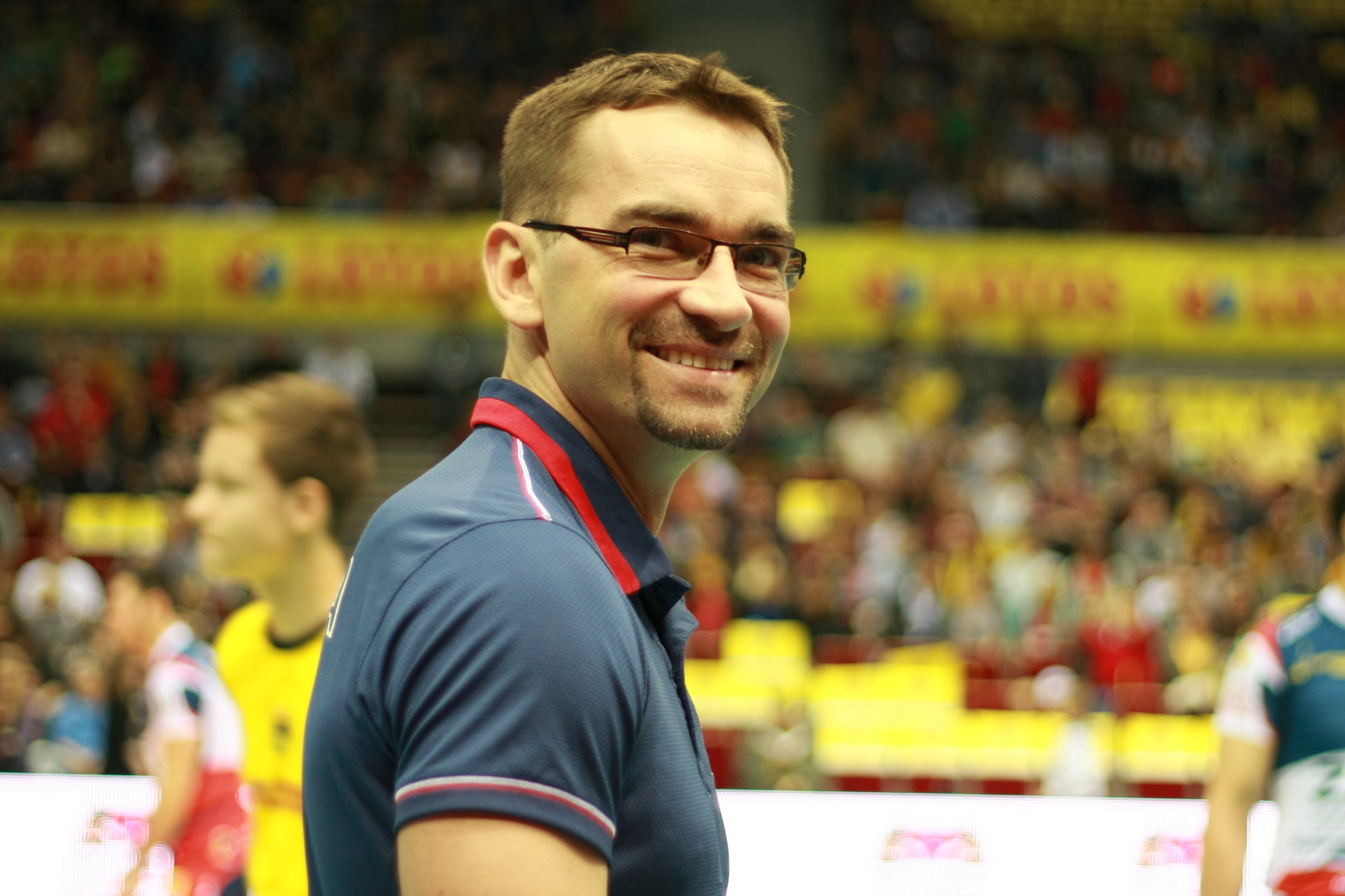
- Świderski with ZAKSA in 2012

Personal information
- Full name: Sebastian Krzysztof Świderski
- Nickname: Świder
- Born: 26 June 1977 (age 49); Skwierzyna, Poland
- Height: 1.93 m (6 ft 4 in)

Coaching information
Previous teams coached
Years	Teams
2012; 2012–2013; 2013–2015	Fart Kielce; ZAKSA Kędzierzyn-Koźle (AC); ZAKSA Kędzierzyn-Koźle

Volleyball information
- Position: Outside hitter

Career
Years	Teams
1995–2000; 2000–2003; 2003–2007; 2007–2010; 2010–2012	Stilon Gorzów Wielkopolski; Mostostal Azoty Kędzierzyn-Koźle; Umbria Volley; Volley Lube; ZAKSA Kędzierzyn-Koźle

National team
1996–2011	Poland (322)
Honours
Men's volleyball
Representing Poland
FIVB World Championship
Silver medal – second place	2006 Japan

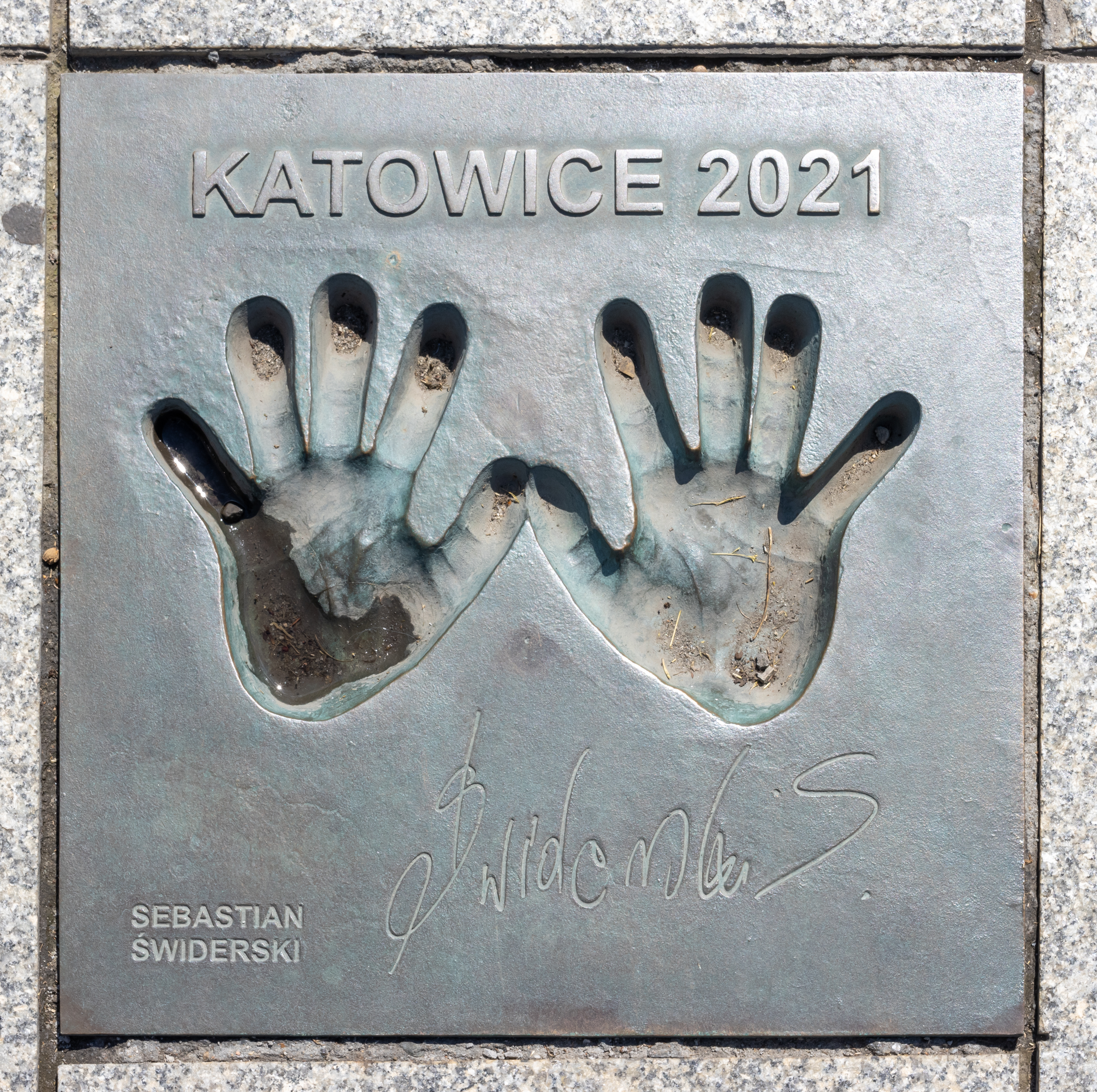
Hand prints and signature at the Avenue of Volleyball Stars, Katowice

Sebastian Krzysztof Świderski (born 26 June 1977) is a Polish former professional volleyball player and coach. He was a member of the Poland national team from 1996 to 2011, a participant in the Olympic Games (Athens 2004, Beijing 2008), and a silver medallist at the 2006 World Championship. Since 2021, Świderski has been president of the Polish Volleyball Federation.

== Career as player ==
=== Club ===
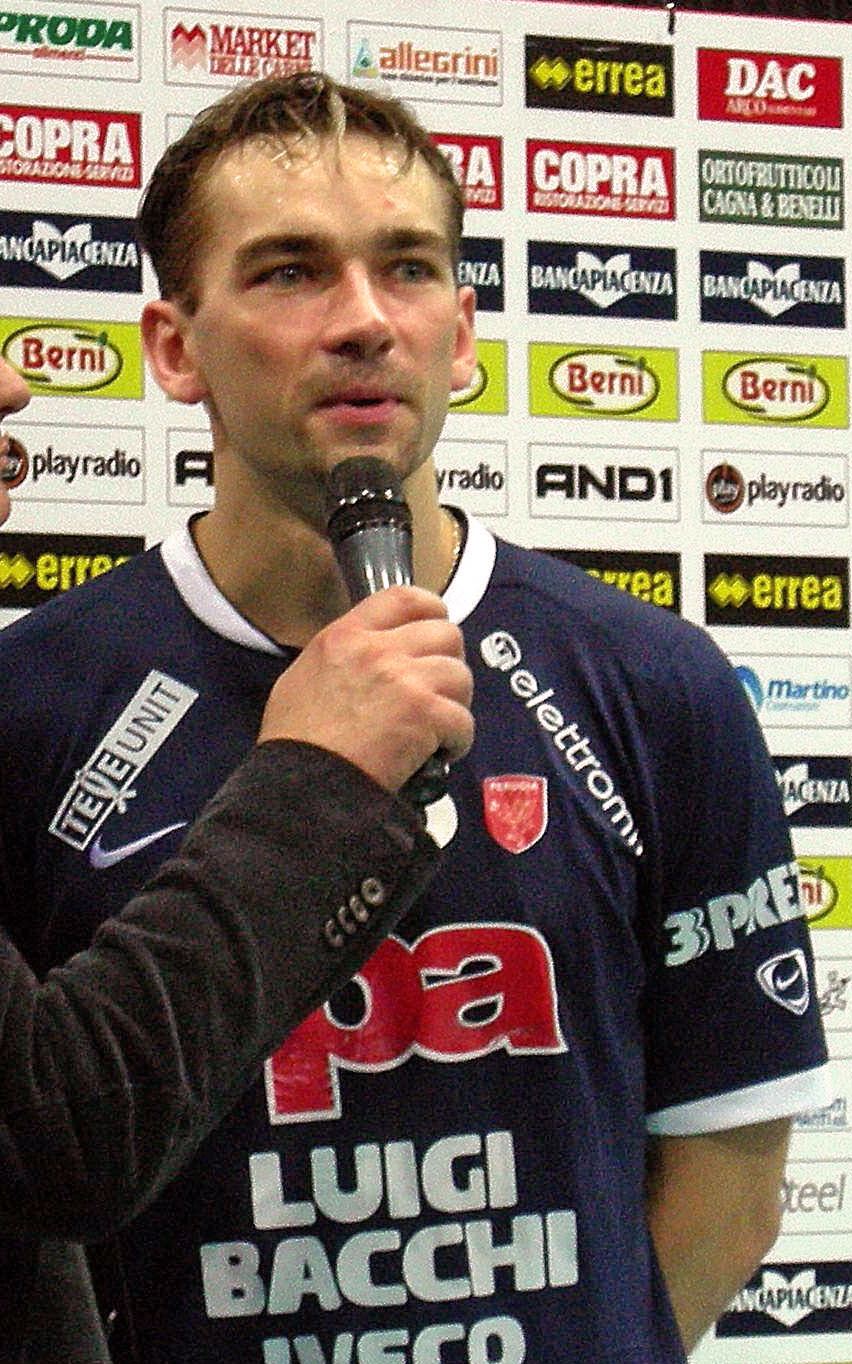
As a player of Perugia Volley after a match in Piacenza in 2006

Świderski's first club as a player was Znicz Gorzów Wielkopolski. Then, he played for Stilon Gorzów Wielkopolski, with whom he won bronze and silver medals of the Polish Championship and Polish Cup in 1997. In 2000, he started playing for Mostostal Azoty Kędzierzyn-Koźle. With the club from Kędzierzyn-Koźle, Świderski won the Polish Cup twice (in 2001, 2002) and three titles of Polish Champion in 2001, 2002, 2003. During the 2002/2003 season, the club won the bronze medal in the CEV Champions League. He moved to Italian Serie A in 2003, where he played four seasons in Perugia Volley and three seasons in Lube Banca Macerata. He played in shirt number 16 in order to honor the memory of the player Arkadiusz Gołaś, who died on his way to the club from Macerata. With the club from Perugia, Świderski won a silver medal at the Italian Championship in season 2004/2005. Whilst playing for Lube Banca Macerata, he won two Italian Cups (2008, 2009), the Italian SuperCup, 2008 and a bronze medal in the Italian Championship 2008/2009. He ended his sporting career after his final two seasons in PlusLiga playing for ZAKSA. In 2011, he won a silver medal in the CEV Cup and the Polish Championship.

=== National team ===
Świderski made his international debut for Poland in December 1997 against Israel, losing 3-1. He has since participated in the Olympic Games at both Athens in 2004 and Beijing in 2008 for Poland, finishing 5th both times. He is a silver medalist of the World Championship 2006. He ended his career during an official ceremony after a match of the national team in 2012 in Katowice.

== Career as coach ==
In 2012, Świderski made his debut as a coach; he was appointed to work in this role for a PlusLiga club, Fart Kielce. In the next season, he worked as an assistant coach in ZAKSA Kędzierzyn-Koźle, where the first coach was Daniel Castellani. From 2013 to 2015, he was the head coach of ZAKSA. The first trophy which he won as the head coach, was the Polish Cup in 2014.

== Honours ==
=== As a player ===
- CEV Cup
  - 2010–11 – with ZAKSA Kędzierzyn-Koźle
- Domestic
  - 1996–97 Polish Cup, with Stilon Gorzów Wielkopolski
  - 2000–01 Polish Cup, with Mostostal Azoty Kędzierzyn-Koźle
  - 2000–01 Polish Championship, with Mostostal Azoty Kędzierzyn-Koźle
  - 2001–02 Polish Cup, with Mostostal Azoty Kędzierzyn-Koźle
  - 2001–02 Polish Championship, with Mostostal Azoty Kędzierzyn-Koźle
  - 2002–03 Polish Championship, with Mostostal Azoty Kędzierzyn-Koźle
  - 2007–08 Italian SuperCup, with Lube Banca Marche Macerata
  - 2007–08 Italian Cup, with Lube Banca Marche Macerata
  - 2008–09 Italian Cup, with Lube Banca Marche Macerata
- Youth national team
  - 1996 CEV U20 European Championship
  - 1997 FIVB U21 World Championship

=== As a coach ===
- Domestic
  - 2013–14 Polish Cup, with ZAKSA Kędzierzyn-Koźle

=== Individual awards ===
- 2000: Polish Championship – Most valuable player
- 2008: Olympic Games – Best spiker

=== State awards ===
- 2006: Gold Cross of Merit

== Trophies won by Polish Volleyball Federation during presidency ==
- 2023: European Championship – Championship
- 2023: Nations League – Championship
