= Piotr Gruszka =

Polish volleyball player and coach

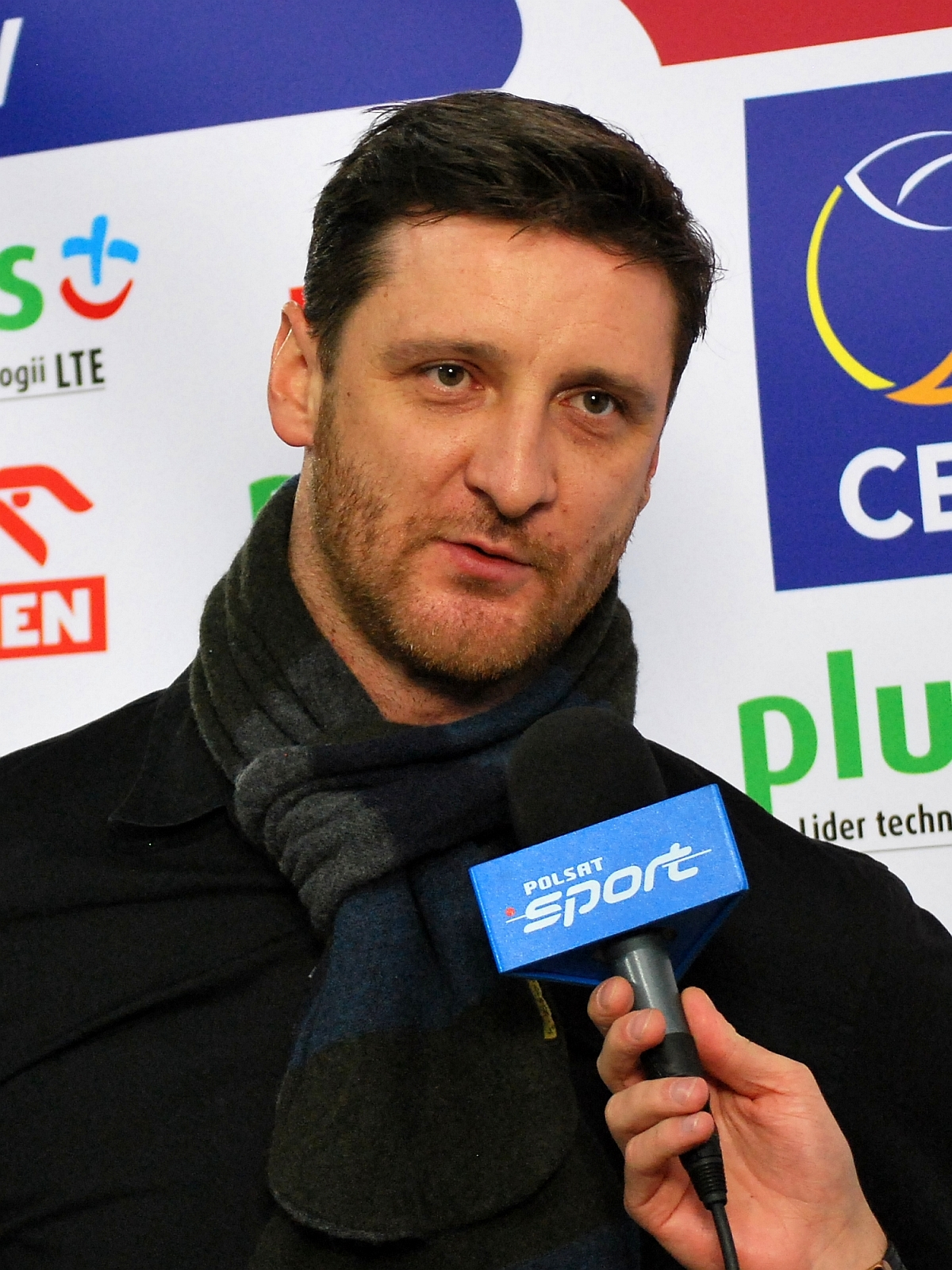

Personal information
- Full name: Piotr Łukasz Gruszka
- Nickname: Grucha
- Born: 8 March 1977 (age 49); Oświęcim, Poland
- Height: 2.06 m (6 ft 9 in)

Coaching information
Previous teams coached
Years	Teams
2014–2015; 2016–2019; 2017; 2019–2020; 2021–2022	BBTS Bielsko-Biała; GKS Katowice; Poland (AC); Asseco Resovia; Norwid Częstochowa

Volleyball information
- Position: Outside hitter / Opposite

Career
Years	Teams
1993–1995; 1995–1999; 1999–2000; 2000–2002; 2002–2003; 2003–2004; 2004–2005; 2005–2006; 2006–2008; 2008–2009; 2009–2010; 2010–2011; 2011–2012; 2012–2013	BBTS Bielsko-Biała; AZS Częstochowa; Zeta Line Padova; Alimenti Sardi Cagliari; AdriaVolley Trieste; Tourcoing LM; Skra Bełchatów; AZS Olsztyn; Skra Bełchatów; Arkas İzmir; Delecta Bydgoszcz; Halkbank Ankara; CMC Ravenna; AZS Olsztyn

National team
1995–2011	Poland (450)
Honours
Men's volleyball
Representing Poland
FIVB World Championship
Silver medal – second place	2006 Japan
FIVB World League
Bronze medal – third place	2011 Gdańsk
CEV European Championship
Gold medal – first place	2009 Turkey
Bronze medal – third place	2011 Austria/Czech Republic

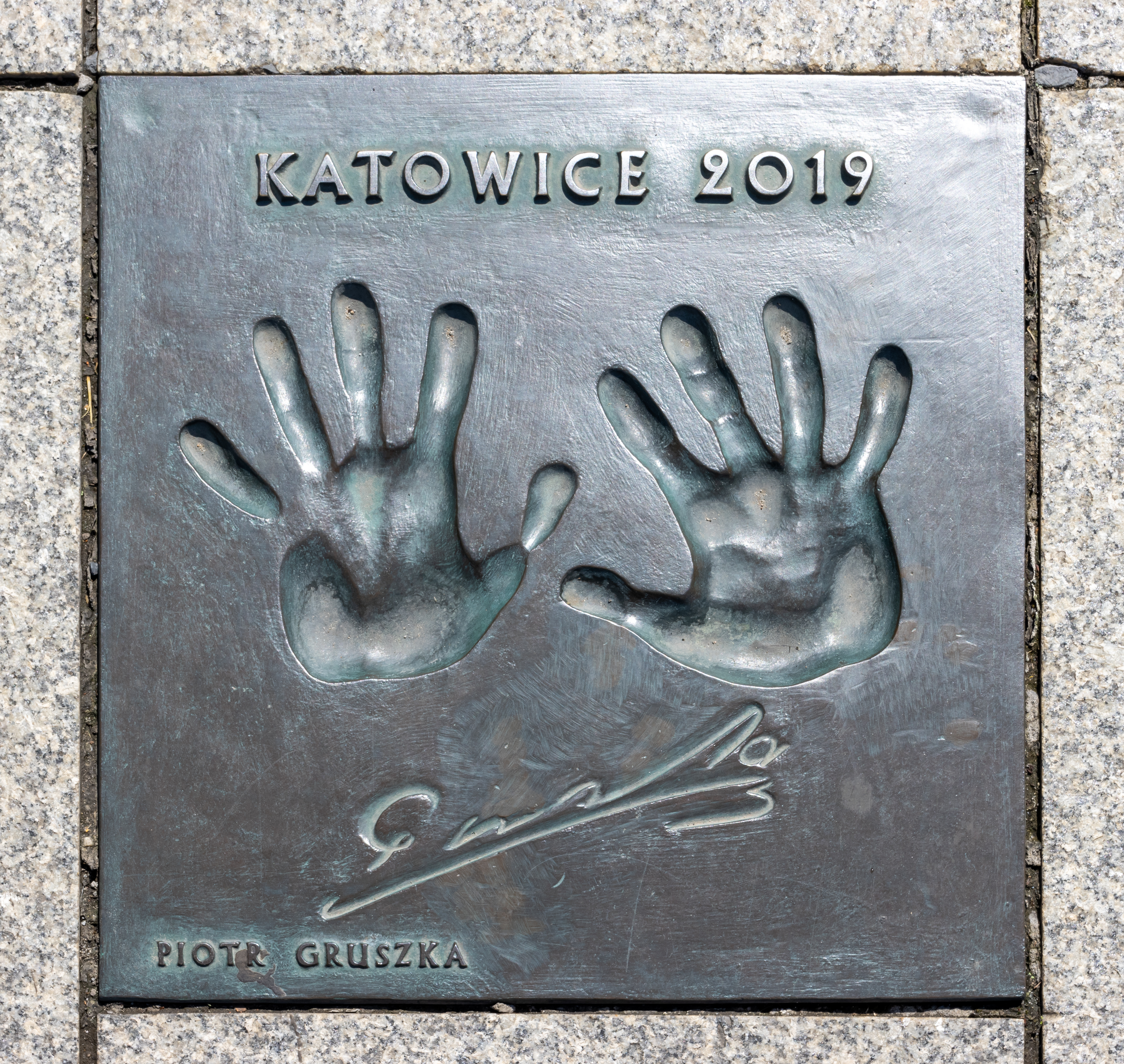
Hand prints and signature at the Avenue of Volleyball Stars, Katowice

Piotr Łukasz Gruszka (born 8 March 1977) is a Polish professional volleyball coach and former player. He was a member of the Poland national team from 1995 to 2011, and took part in 3 Olympic Games (Atlanta 1996, Athens 2004, Beijing 2008).

== Personal life ==
Piotr Gruszka was born in Oświęcim, but raised in Kęty. He is married to Aleksandra (née Szettel). They have two children: daughter Maria Aleksandra (born 26 August 2005) and son named Julian (born 1 March 2010).

In 2014, he took part in the 14th season of Polish version of Dancing with the Stars. His pro dancer was Nina Tyrka. They were eliminated as 8th couple and took 5th place.

== Career ==
=== National team ===
Piotr Gruszka was a member of the Polish national team that won a silver medal at the 2006 World Championship. In 2009, Gruszka won a gold medal of the European Championship, where he was named the Most Valuable Player. On 14 September 2009, he was awarded the Knight's Cross of Polonia Restituta. The Order was conferred on the following day by the Prime Minister of Poland, Donald Tusk. With his national team, he won two bronze medals in 2011: of the 2011 World League and 2011 European Championship.

== Honours ==
=== Club ===
- CEV Challenge Cup
  - 2008–09 – with Arkas İzmir
- Domestic
  - 1994–95 Polish Championship, with AZS Częstochowa
  - 1996–97 Polish Championship, with AZS Częstochowa
  - 1997–98 Polish Cup, with AZS Częstochowa
  - 2004–05 Polish Cup, with PGE Skra Bełchatów
  - 2004–05 Polish Championship, with PGE Skra Bełchatów
  - 2006–07 Polish Cup, with PGE Skra Bełchatów
  - 2006–07 Polish Championship, with PGE Skra Bełchatów
  - 2007–08 Polish Championship, with PGE Skra Bełchatów
  - 2008–09 Turkish Cup, with Arkas İzmir

=== Youth national team ===
- 1996 CEV U20 European Championship
- 1997 FIVB U21 World Championship

=== Individual awards ===
- 2003: CEV European Championship – Best spiker
- 2009: CEV European Championship – Most valuable player

=== State awards ===
- 2006: Gold Cross of Merit
- 2009: Knight's Cross of Polonia Restituta

Sporting positions
Preceded by (Czech Republic) Martin Lébl	Best Spiker of CEV European Championship; 2003	Succeeded by (Spain) Israel Rodríguez
Preceded by (Russia) Semyon Poltavskiy	Most Valuable Player of CEV European Championship; 2009	Succeeded by (Serbia) Ivan Miljković
