= Paweł Papke =

Polish volleyball player (born 1977)

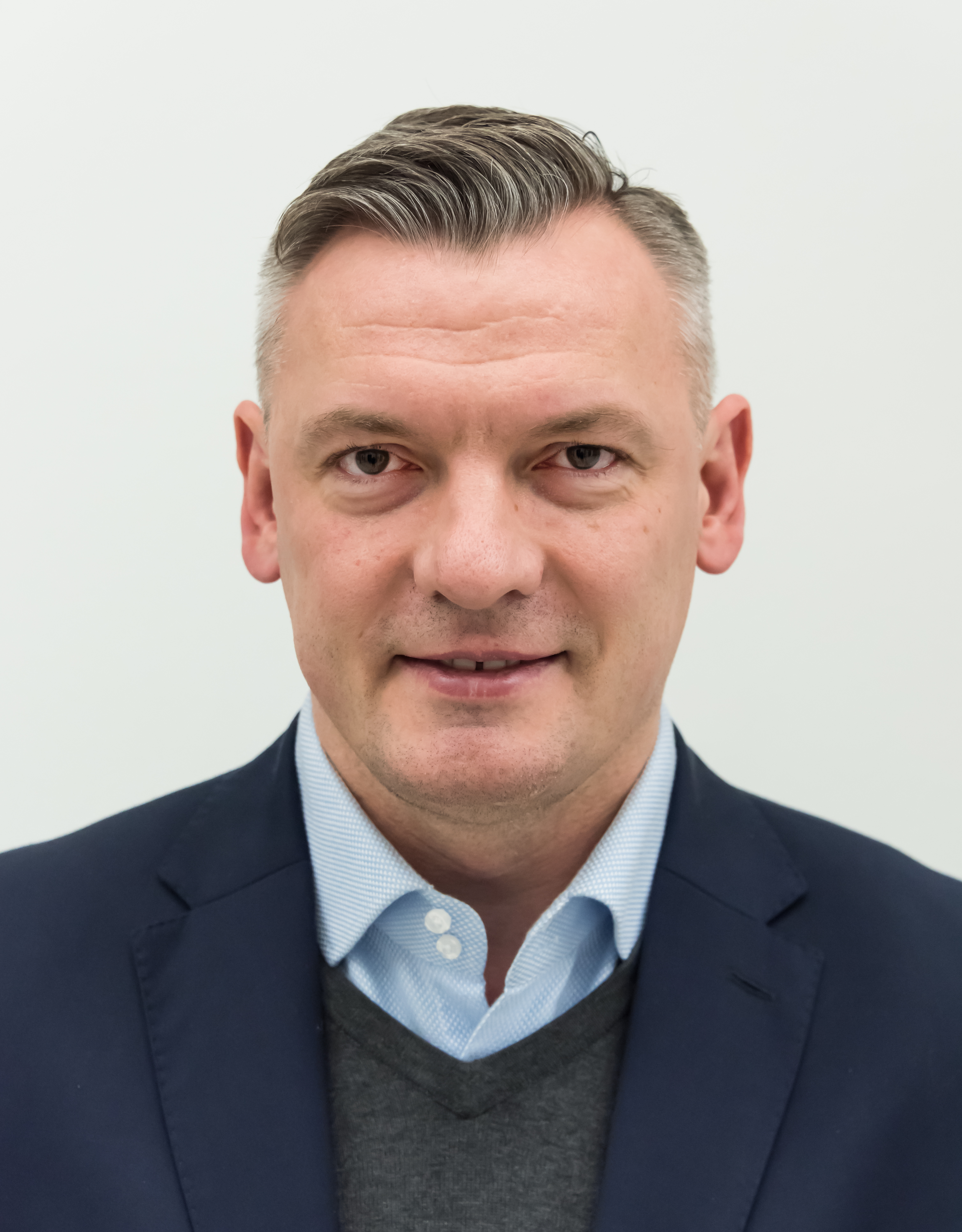

Personal information
- Nationality: (Poland) Polish
- Born: 13 February 1977 (age 49); Starogard Gdański, Poland

Volleyball information
- Position: Opposite

Career
Years	Teams
1996–2003; 2003–2007; 2007–2010	Mostostal Azoty Kędzierzyn-Koźle; AZS Olsztyn; Asseco Resovia

National team
1996–2003	Poland (149)

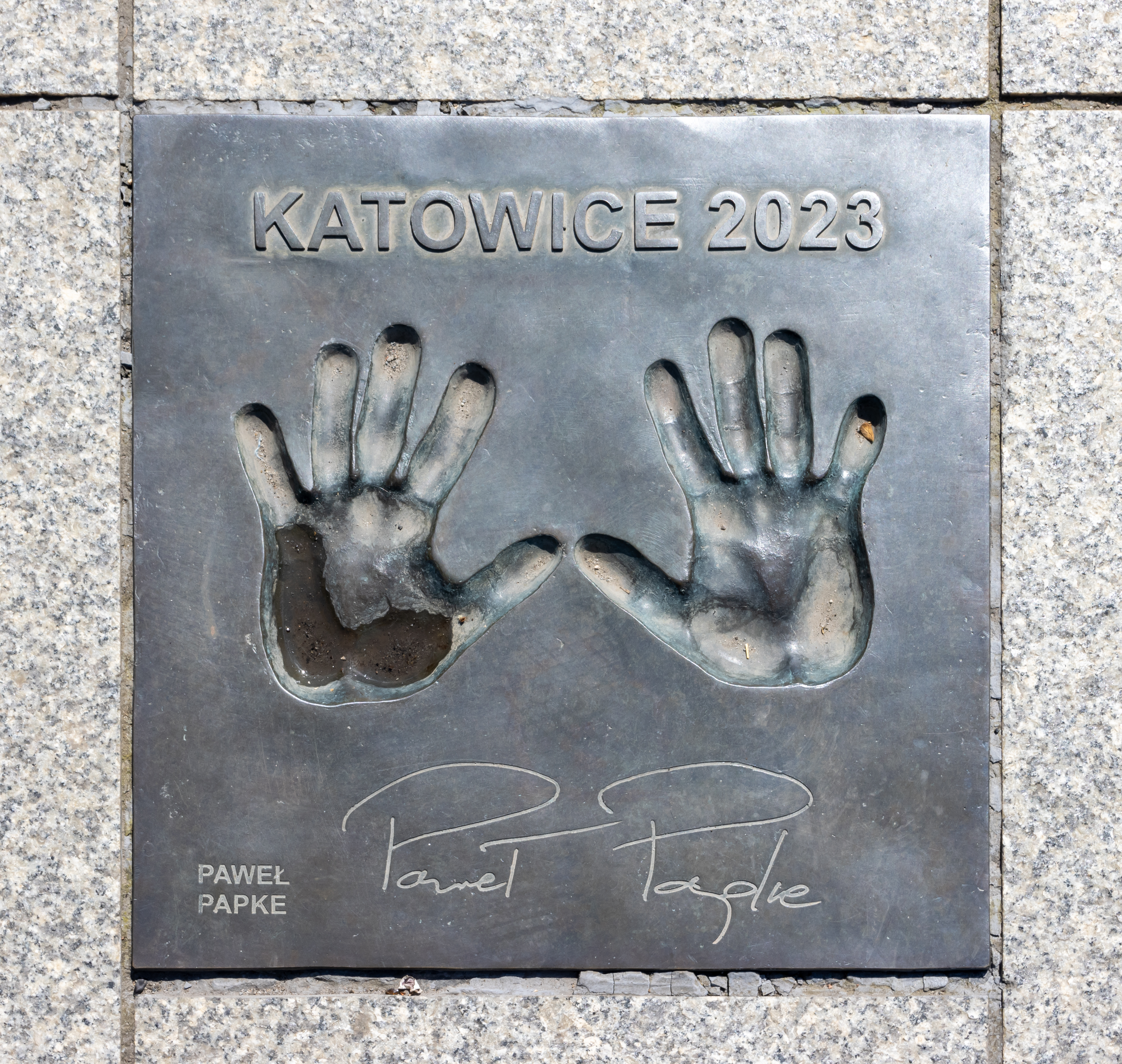
Hand prints and signature at the Avenue of Volleyball Stars, Katowice

Paweł Papke (born 13 February 1977) is a Polish politician and former volleyball player, current member of the Polish parliament. In the past, he was part of the Polish national team and a president of the Polish Volleyball Federation.

== Personal life ==
Papke was born in Starogard Gdański, Poland. He is married to Iwona Oleś. They have a son Szymon and a daughter Martyna.

== Sporting achievements ==
=== As a player ===
- National championships
  - 1997/1998 Polish Championship, with KS Mostostal ZA Kędzierzyn
  - 1999/2000 Polish Cup, with Mostostal Azoty Kędzierzyn-Koźle
  - 1999/2000 Polish Championship, with Mostostal Azoty Kędzierzyn-Koźle
  - 2000/2001 Polish Cup, with Mostostal Azoty Kędzierzyn-Koźle
  - 2000/2001 Polish Championship, with Mostostal Azoty Kędzierzyn-Koźle
  - 2001/2002 Polish Cup, with Mostostal Azoty Kędzierzyn-Koźle
  - 2001/2002 Polish Championship, with Mostostal Azoty Kędzierzyn-Koźle
  - 2002/2003 Polish Championship, with Mostostal Azoty Kędzierzyn-Koźle

=== Youth national team ===
- 1996 CEV U20 European Championship
- 1997 FIVB U21 World Championship

=== Individual awards ===
- 2008: CEV Challenge Cup – Best Opposite
