= Stellmach =

Stellmach is a surname derived from the German word "Stellmacher", meaning "cartwright" or "wheelwright". It is a variant of the surname Stelmach.

Notable people with the surname include:

- Thomas Stellmach (born 1965), German animated film producer and director
- Manuela Stellmach (born 1970), German swimmer
- Natascha Stellmach (born 1970), Australian artist
