= Woźnica =

Woźnica is a Polish occupational surname literally meaning "coachman". Notable people with the name include:

- Adam Woźnica (born 1994), Polish volleyball player
- Gerard Woźnica (1917–1981), Polish soldier and partisan commander during World War II, officer of the Home Army, Knight of the Order of Virtuti Militari
- Janusz Woźnica (born 1949), Polish educator and politician, member of the Senate
- Michał Woźnica (born 1983), Polich hockey player
