= Stelmach =

Stelmach is a surname. Notable people with the name include:

- Andrzej Stelmach (born 1972), Polish former volleyball player and volleyball coach
- Ed Stelmach (born 1951), Canadian politician
- Kacper Stelmach (born 1997), Polish volleyball player, son of Andrzej
- Krzysztof Stelmach (born 1967), Polish former volleyball player and volleyball coach, brother of Andrzej
- Nahum Stelmach (1936–1999), Israeli footballer and manager
