= 2003–04 Polish Volleyball League =

- League: Polish Volleyball League
- Sport: Volleyball
- Duration: 4 October 2003 – 20 April 2004
- Number of teams: 10
- League champions: Ivett Jastrzębie Borynia (1st title)

Seasons
- ← 2002–03 2004–05 →

The 2003–04 Polish Volleyball League was the 68th season of the Polish Volleyball Championship, the 4th season as a professional league organized by the Professional Volleyball League SA (Polish: Profesjonalna Liga Piłki Siatkowej SA) under the supervision of the Polish Volleyball Federation (Polish: Polski Związek Piłki Siatkowej).

Ivett Jastrzębie Borynia won their 1st title of the Polish Champions.

== Regular season ==
Pos	Team	Pld	W	L	Pts	SW	SL	SR	SPW	SPL	SPR	Qualification
1	Ivett Jastrzębie Borynia	18	14	4	42	47	21	2.238	1572	1411	1.114	Playoffs
2	EKS Skra Bełchatów	18	14	4	41	45	19	2.368	1500	1349	1.112	Playoffs
3	PZU AZS Olsztyn	18	12	6	33	40	28	1.429	1551	1432	1.083	Playoffs
4	Pamapol AZS Częstochowa	18	11	7	31	41	34	1.206	1673	1628	1.028	Playoffs
5	KP Polska Energia Sosnowiec	18	9	9	27	37	35	1.057	1621	1593	1.018	Playoffs
6	Mostostal Azoty Kędzierzyn-Koźle	18	9	9	26	34	35	0.971	1525	1503	1.015	Playoffs
7	AZS Politechnika Warszawska	18	5	13	18	24	43	0.558	1395	1548	0.901	Playoffs
8	NKS Nysa	18	5	13	18	22	42	0.524	1355	1500	0.903	Playoffs
9	BBTS Siatkarz Original Bielsko-Biała	18	6	12	17	26	42	0.619	1434	1551	0.925	
10	Gwardia Wrocław	18	5	13	17	27	44	0.614	1514	1625	0.932	

Source: PlusLiga

== Playoffs ==
- (to 3 victories)

Quarterfinals
1	Ivett Jastrzębie Borynia	3
8	NKS Nysa	1
5	KP Polska Energia Sosnowiec	2
4	Pamapol AZS Częstochowa	3
3	PZU AZS Olsztyn	3
6	Mostostal Azoty Kędzierzyn-Koźle	0
7	AZS Politechnika Warszawska	0
2	EKS Skra Bełchatów	3

Semifinals
1	Ivett Jastrzębie Borynia	3
4	Pamapol AZS Częstochowa	2
3	PZU AZS Olsztyn	3
2	EKS Skra Bełchatów	2

Finals
1	Ivett Jastrzębie Borynia	3
2	PZU AZS Olsztyn	0

== Final standings ==
Qualified for the 2004–05 CEV Champions League
Qualified for the 2004–05 CEV Cup
Playoffs with the 2nd team from the 1st league
Relegation to the 1st league

Rank	Team
1st place, gold medalist(s)	Ivett Jastrzębie Borynia
2nd place, silver medalist(s)	PZU AZS Olsztyn
3rd place, bronze medalist(s)	Pamapol AZS Częstochowa
4	EKS Skra Bełchatów
5	KP Polska Energia Sosnowiec
6	Mostostal Azoty Kędzierzyn-Koźle
7	NKS Nysa
8	AZS Politechnika Warszawska
9	BBTS Siatkarz Original Bielsko-Biała
10	Gwardia Wrocław

2004 Polish Champions
Ivett Jastrzębie Borynia
1st title
