= Best Player in PlusLiga =

Annual Polish volleyball award

PlusLiga Most Valuable Player
- Awarded for: Poland Volleyball League – PlusLiga MVP
- Country: Poland
- First award: 2004–05

The Best Player in PlusLiga (MVP) is an annual award given to the best player in PlusLiga.

== Recipients ==
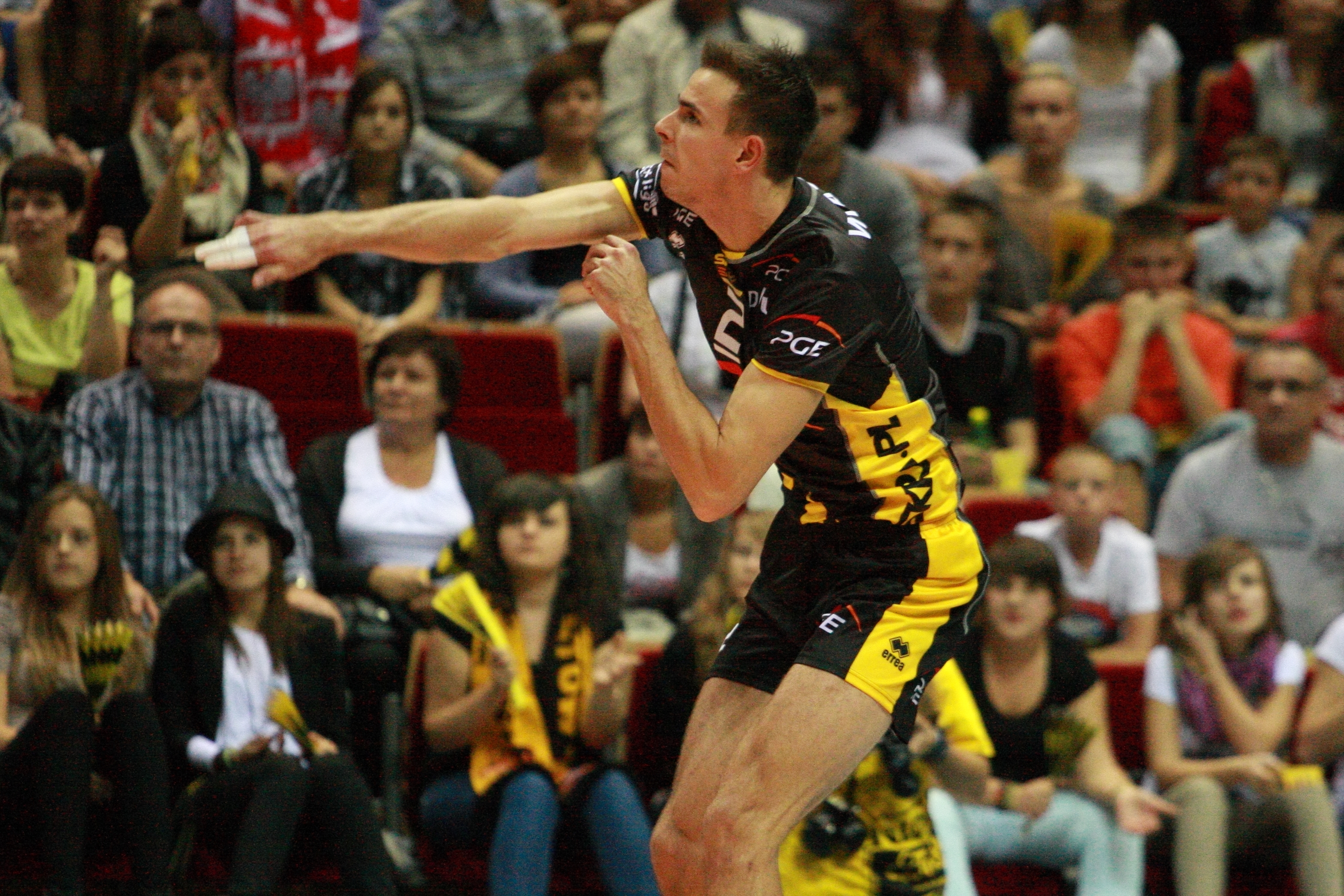
Mariusz Wlazły has won the award on six separate occasions.

- 2004–2005 (Poland) Piotr Gruszka
- 2005–2006 (Poland) Mariusz Wlazły
- 2006–2007 (Poland) Paweł Zagumny
- 2007–2008 (Poland) Mariusz Wlazły
- 2008–2009 (France) Stéphane Antiga
- 2009–2010 (Poland) Mariusz Wlazły
- 2010–2011 (Poland) Mariusz Wlazły
- 2011–2012 (Germany) György Grozer
- 2012–2013 (Brazil) Luiz Felipe Fonteles
- 2013–2014 (Poland) Mariusz Wlazły
- 2014–2015 (Germany) Jochen Schöps
- 2015–2016 (France) Benjamin Toniutti
- 2016–2017 (Belgium) Sam Deroo
- 2017–2018 (Poland) Mariusz Wlazły
- 2018–2019 (Belgium) Sam Deroo
- 2019–2020 (Poland) Grzegorz Łomacz
- 2020–2021 (Morocco) Mohammed Al Hachdadi
- 2021–2022 (Poland) Marcin Janusz
- 2022–2023 (Poland) Tomasz Fornal
- 2023–2024 (Poland) Norbert Huber
