= Gwardia Wrocław =

Gwardia Wrocław can refer to:

- Gwardia Wrocław (men's volleyball)
- Gwardia Wrocław (women's volleyball)
- Gwardia Wrocław (sports club) (pl)
- Gwardia Wrocław (basketball) (pl)
- Gwardia Wrocław (football) (pl)
