= Adam Woźnica =

Polish volleyball player (born 1994)

Personal information
- Nationality: (Poland) Polish
- Born: 9 May 1994 (age 32)
- Height: 6 ft 6 in (1.98 m)
- Weight: 176 lb (80 kg)
- Spike: 136 in (346 cm)
- Block: 128 in (326 cm)

Volleyball information
- Position: Middle blocker
- Current club: (Poland) MKS Będzin II

Career
Years	Teams
2010–2013; 2013–2014; 2014–2015; 2015–2016; 2016–2017; 2017–2018; 2018–2019; 2019–2020; 2020–	(Poland) Exact Systems Norwid Częstochowa (Poland) Morze Bałtyk Szczecin (Poland) Avia Świdnik (Poland) Czarni Rząśnia (Poland) ZAKSA Strzelce Opolskie (Poland) MKS Aqua-Zdrój Wałbrzych (Poland) Buskowianka Kielce (Poland) KPS Siedlce (Poland) MKS Będzin II

Adam Woźnica (born 9 May 1994) is a Polish volleyball player, playing in position middle blocker.

== Sporting achievements ==
=== Clubs ===
Youth Polish Championship:

- 2011

Junior Polish Championship:

- 2012, 2013
