= 1997 FIVB Volleyball Men's U21 World Championship =

1997 Men's U21 World Championship
Tournament details
- Host country: Bahrain
- City: Manama
- Dates: 22–31 August
- Teams: 16

Final positions
- Champions: Poland (1st title)

The 1997 FIVB Volleyball Men's U21 World Championship was the 9th edition of the FIVB Volleyball Men's U21 World Championship. It was held in Manama, Bahrain from August 22 to 31, 1997.

Poland won their first title in the tournament by defeating Brazil.

== Final round ==
5th–8th places
August 28 – Manama
Italy	3
Latvia	0
August 28 – Manama
Greece	3
Yugoslavia	1

5th place
August 29 – Manama
Italy	1
Greece	3
7th place
August 29 – Manama
Latvia	0
Yugoslavia	3

=== 5th–8th semifinals ===
Date		Score		Set 1	Set 2	Set 3	Set 4	Set 5	Total
28 Aug	Italy	3–0	Latvia	15–8	15–9	15–11			45–28
28 Aug	Greece	3–1	Yugoslavia	15–11	9–15	15–9	15–0		54–35

==== 7th place ====
Date		Score		Set 1	Set 2	Set 3	Set 4	Set 5	Total
29 Aug	Latvia	0–3	Yugoslavia	16–14	15–12	15–11			46–37

==== 5th place ====
Date		Score		Set 1	Set 2	Set 3	Set 4	Set 5	Total
29 Aug	Italy	1–3	Greece	15–4	16–14	13–15	15–9		59–42

Quarterfinals
August 27 – Manama
Russia	3
Latvia	0
August 27 – Manama
Poland	3
Italy	1
August 27 – Manama
Brazil	3
Greece	2
August 27 – Manama
Venezuela	3
Yugoslavia	1

Semifinals
August 28 – Manama
Russia	1
Poland	3
August 28 – Manama
Brazil	3
Venezuela	0

Final
August 29 – Manama
Poland	3
Brazil	1
3rd place
August 29 – Manama
Russia	3
Venezuela	1

=== Quarterfinals ===
Date		Score		Set 1	Set 2	Set 3	Set 4	Set 5	Total
27 Aug	Russia	3–0	Latvia	15–1	15–6	15–3			45–10
27 Aug	Poland	3–1	Italy	9–15	15–10	15–10	15–9		54–44
27 Aug	Brazil	3–2	Greece	13–15	13–15	15–5	15–4	15–11	71–50
27 Aug	Venezuela	3–1	Yugoslavia	15–11	15–13	7–15	15–6		52–45

=== Semifinals ===
Date		Score		Set 1	Set 2	Set 3	Set 4	Set 5	Total
28 Aug	Russia	1–3	Poland	15–7	11–15	15–12	15–7		52–41
28 Aug	Brazil	3–0	Venezuela	15–10	15–7	15–12			45–29

==== 3rd place ====
Date		Score		Set 1	Set 2	Set 3	Set 4	Set 5	Total
29 Aug	Russia	3–1	Venezuela	15–8	14–16	15–9	15–10		59–43

==== Final ====
Date		Score		Set 1	Set 2	Set 3	Set 4	Set 5	Total
29 Aug	Poland	3–1	Brazil	15–11	13–15	15–3	15–5		58–34

== Final standing ==
Rank	Team
1st place, gold medalist(s)	Poland
2nd place, silver medalist(s)	Brazil
3rd place, bronze medalist(s)	Russia
4	Venezuela
5	Greece
6	Italy
7	Yugoslavia
8	Latvia
9	Iran
9	Bahrain
9	Puerto Rico
9	China
13	Tunisia
13	Nigeria
13	Mexico
13	Chinese Taipei

1997 Men's U21 World champions

Poland
1st title

12–man Roster
Michał Chadała, Piotr Gruszka, Krzysztof Ignaczak, Łukasz Kruk, Dawid Murek, Paweł Papke, Marcin Prus, Robert Szczerbaniuk, Grzegorz Szymański, Sebastian Świderski, Radosław Wnuk, Paweł Zagumny
Head coach
Ireneusz Mazur
