= Hutnik Kraków (volleyball) =

Polish volleyball club

- Full name: Klub Sportowy Hutnik Kraków
- Founded: 1950
- Dissolved: 1993
- Ground: Hala Widowiskowo–Sportowa Suche Stawy, Kraków

Hutnik Kraków, Hutnik Nowa Huta – was a volleyball section of the same name club from Poland based in Nowa Huta, Kraków's district. It existed in 1950–1993. The club competed in the highest level of Polish Volleyball League. Two–time Polish Champion (1988, 1989), and three–time Polish Cup winner (1974, 1988, 1990).

== Honours ==
- Polish Championship

Winners (2): 1987–88, 1988–89

- Polish Cup

Winners (3): 1973–74, 1987–88, 1989–90
