= 2000–01 Polish Volleyball League =

- League: Polish Volleyball League
- Sport: Volleyball
- Duration: 29 September 2000 – 11 April 2001
- Number of teams: 10
- League champions: Mostostal Azoty Kędzierzyn-Koźle (3rd title)

Seasons
- 2001–02 →

The 2000–01 Polish Volleyball League was the 65th season of the Polish Volleyball Championship, the 1st season as a professional league organized by the Professional Volleyball League SA (Polish: Profesjonalna Liga Piłki Siatkowej SA) under the supervision of the Polish Volleyball Federation (Polish: Polski Związek Piłki Siatkowej).

Mostostal Azoty Kędzierzyn-Koźle achieved their 3rd title of the Polish Champions.

== Regular season ==
Pos	Team	Pld	W	L	Pts	SW	SL	SR	SPW	SPL	SPR	Qualification
1	Mostostal Azoty Kędzierzyn-Koźle	18	14	4	32	45	21	2.143	1573	1409	1.116	Playoffs
2	Galaxia Jurajska AZS Bank Częstochowa	18	13	5	31	43	25	1.720	1596	1454	1.098	Playoffs
3	Jastrzębie Borynia	18	12	6	30	40	25	1.600	1537	1463	1.051	Playoffs
4	Warka Strong Czarni Radom	18	11	7	29	42	35	1.200	1721	1708	1.008	Playoffs
5	KS Citroën Nysa	18	9	9	27	35	34	1.029	1477	1498	0.986	Playoffs
6	Morze Szczecin	18	8	10	26	35	40	0.875	1655	1704	0.971	Playoffs
7	Indykpol AZS Olsztyn	18	7	11	25	35	39	0.897	1606	1660	0.967	Playoffs
8	Stolarka Wołomin	18	7	11	25	30	42	0.714	1544	1614	0.957	Playoffs
9	Stilon Meryl Gorzów	18	5	13	23	22	46	0.478	1501	1574	0.954	
10	Kazimierz Płomień Sosnowiec	18	4	14	22	25	45	0.556	1470	1596	0.921	

Source: PlusLiga

== Playoffs ==
- (to 3 victories)

Quarterfinals
1	Mostostal Azoty Kędzierzyn-Koźle	3
8	Stolarka Wołomin	1
5	KS Citroën Nysa	0
4	Warka Strong Czarni Radom	3
3	Jastrzębie Borynia	3
6	Morze Szczecin	0
7	Indykpol AZS Olsztyn	0
2	Galaxia Jurajska AZS Bank Częstochowa	3

Semifinals
1	Mostostal Azoty Kędzierzyn-Koźle	3
4	Warka Strong Czarni Radom	0
3	Jastrzębie Borynia	2
2	Galaxia Jurajska AZS Bank Częstochowa	3

Finals
1	Mostostal Azoty Kędzierzyn-Koźle	3
2	Galaxia Jurajska AZS Bank Częstochowa	0

== Final standings ==
Qualified for the 2001–02 CEV Champions League
Qualified for the 2001–02 CEV Top Teams Cup
Qualified for the 2001–02 CEV Cup
Playoffs with the 2nd team from the 1st league
Relegation to the 1st league

Rank	Team
1st place, gold medalist(s)	Mostostal Azoty Kędzierzyn-Koźle
2nd place, silver medalist(s)	Galaxia Jurajska AZS Bank Częstochowa
3rd place, bronze medalist(s)	Jastrzębie Borynia
4	Warka Strong Czarni Radom
5	Indykpol AZS Olsztyn
6	Stolarka Wołomin
7	KS Citroën Nysa
8	Morze Szczecin
9	Stilon Meryl Gorzów
10	Kazimierz Płomień Sosnowiec

2001 Polish Champions
Mostostal Azoty Kędzierzyn-Koźle
3rd title
