= 2001–02 Polish Volleyball League =

- League: Polish Volleyball League
- Sport: Volleyball
- Duration: 12 October 2001 – 27 April 2002
- Number of teams: 10
- League champions: Mostostal Azoty Kędzierzyn-Koźle (4th title)

Seasons
- ← 2000–01 2002–03 →

The 2001–02 Polish Volleyball League was the 66th season of the Polish Volleyball Championship, the 2nd season as a professional league organized by the Professional Volleyball League SA (Polish: Profesjonalna Liga Piłki Siatkowej SA) under the supervision of the Polish Volleyball Federation (Polish: Polski Związek Piłki Siatkowej).

Mostostal Azoty Kędzierzyn-Koźle won their 4th title of the Polish Champions.

== Regular season ==
Pos	Team	Pld	W	L	Pts	SW	SL	SR	SPW	SPL	SPR	Qualification
1	Mostostal Azoty Kędzierzyn-Koźle	18	16	2	48	52	18	2.889	1643	1451	1.132	Playoffs
2	AZS Częstochowa	18	13	5	39	47	24	1.958	1640	1485	1.104	Playoffs
3	KS Nysa	18	12	6	32	39	29	1.345	1560	1511	1.032	Playoffs
4	1044 Gwardia Wrocław	18	9	9	27	35	37	0.946	1605	1608	0.998	Playoffs
5	EKS Skra Bełchatów	18	8	10	26	33	37	0.892	1551	1605	0.966	Playoffs
6	Ivett Jastrzębie Borynia	18	7	11	23	33	39	0.846	1640	1620	1.012	Playoffs
7	Stolarka Wołomin	18	7	11	21	29	38	0.763	1462	1563	0.935	Playoffs
8	PZU AZS Olsztyn	18	8	10	20	30	39	0.769	1556	1614	0.964	Playoffs
9	Morze Szczecin	18	5	13	17	28	44	0.636	1595	1664	0.959	
10	Nordea Czarni Radom	18	5	13	17	24	45	0.533	1491	1622	0.919	

Source: PlusLiga

== Playoffs ==
- (to 3 victories)

Quarterfinals
1	Mostostal Azoty Kędzierzyn-Koźle	3
8	PZU AZS Olsztyn	0
5	EKS Skra Bełchatów	3
4	1044 Gwardia Wrocław	0
3	KS Nysa	1
6	Ivett Jastrzębie Borynia	3
7	Stolarka Wołomin	0
2	Galaxia Starter Bank Częstochowa AZS	3

Semifinals
1	Mostostal Azoty Kędzierzyn-Koźle	3
5	EKS Skra Bełchatów	0
6	Ivett Jastrzębie Borynia	0
2	Galaxia Starter Bank Częstochowa AZS	3

Finals
1	Mostostal Azoty Kędzierzyn-Koźle	3
2	Galaxia Starter Bank Częstochowa AZS	1

== Final standings ==
Qualified for the 2002–03 CEV Champions League
Qualified for the 2002–03 CEV Cup
Playoffs with the 2nd team from the 1st league
Relegation to the 1st league

Rank	Team
1st place, gold medalist(s)	Mostostal Azoty Kędzierzyn-Koźle
2nd place, silver medalist(s)	Galaxia Starter Bank Częstochowa AZS
3rd place, bronze medalist(s)	EKS Skra Bełchatów
4	Ivett Jastrzębie Borynia
5	1044 Gwardia Wrocław
6	Stolarka Wołomin
7	PZU AZS Olsztyn
8	KS Nysa
9	Morze Szczecin
10	Nordea Czarni Radom

2002 Polish Champions
Mostostal Azoty Kędzierzyn-Koźle
4th title
