= 2002–03 Polish Volleyball League =

- League: Polish Volleyball League
- Sport: Volleyball
- Duration: 25 October 2002 – 7 May 2003
- Number of teams: 10
- League champions: Mostostal Azoty Kędzierzyn-Koźle (5th title)

Seasons
- ← 2001–02 2003–04 →

The 2002–03 Polish Volleyball League was the 67th season of the Polish Volleyball Championship, the 3rd season as a professional league organized by the Professional Volleyball League SA (Polish: Profesjonalna Liga Piłki Siatkowej SA) under the supervision of the Polish Volleyball Federation (Polish: Polski Związek Piłki Siatkowej).

Mostostal Azoty Kędzierzyn-Koźle won their 5th title of the Polish Champions.

== Regular season ==
Pos	Team	Pld	W	L	Pts	SW	SL	SR	SPW	SPL	SPR	Qualification
1	Mostostal Azoty Kędzierzyn-Koźle	18	15	3	45	49	19	2.579	1596	1361	1.173	Playoffs
2	Ivett Jastrzębie Borynia	18	15	3	44	47	18	2.611	1538	1358	1.133	Playoffs
3	AZS Częstochowa	18	13	5	38	42	23	1.826	1505	1423	1.058	Playoffs
4	EKS Skra Bełchatów	18	10	8	31	36	27	1.333	1473	1431	1.029	Playoffs
5	KP Polska Energia Sosnowiec	18	10	8	30	39	30	1.300	1553	1477	1.051	Playoffs
6	Hefra Gwardia Wrocław	18	8	10	27	32	36	0.889	1477	1519	0.972	Playoffs
7	PZU AZS Olsztyn	18	9	9	24	33	36	0.917	1564	1535	1.019	Playoffs
8	Morze Szczecin	18	5	13	15	20	44	0.455	1348	1506	0.895	Playoffs
9	GTPS Gorzów Wielkopolski	18	2	16	8	18	49	0.367	1389	1606	0.865	
10	NKS NTO Nysa	18	3	15	8	14	48	0.292	1270	1497	0.848	

Source: PlusLiga

== Playoffs ==
- (to 3 victories)

Quarterfinals
1	Mostostal Azoty Kędzierzyn-Koźle	3
8	Morze Szczecin	0
5	KP Polska Energia Sosnowiec	3
4	EKS Skra Bełchatów	1
3	Galaxia Pamapol Kaffee AZS Częstochowa	3
6	Hefra Gwardia Wrocław	0
7	PZU AZS Olsztyn	2
2	Ivett Jastrzębie Borynia	3

Semifinals
1	Mostostal Azoty Kędzierzyn-Koźle	3
5	KP Polska Energia Sosnowiec	0
3	Galaxia Pamapol Kaffee AZS Częstochowa	3
2	Ivett Jastrzębie Borynia	0

Finals
1	Mostostal Azoty Kędzierzyn-Koźle	3
2	Galaxia Pamapol Kaffee AZS Częstochowa	1

== Final standings ==
Qualified for the 2003–04 CEV Champions League
Qualified for the 2003–04 CEV Cup
Playoffs with the 2nd team from the 1st league
Relegation to the 1st league

Rank	Team
1st place, gold medalist(s)	Mostostal Azoty Kędzierzyn-Koźle
2nd place, silver medalist(s)	Galaxia Pamapol Kaffee AZS Częstochowa
3rd place, bronze medalist(s)	Ivett Jastrzębie Borynia
4	KP Polska Energia Sosnowiec
5	PZU AZS Olsztyn
6	EKS Skra Bełchatów
7	Hefra Gwardia Wrocław
8	Morze Szczecin
9	NKS NTO Nysa
10	GTPS Gorzów Wielkopolski

2003 Polish Champions
Mostostal Azoty Kędzierzyn-Koźle
5th title
