= Natascha Stellmach =

Australian artist

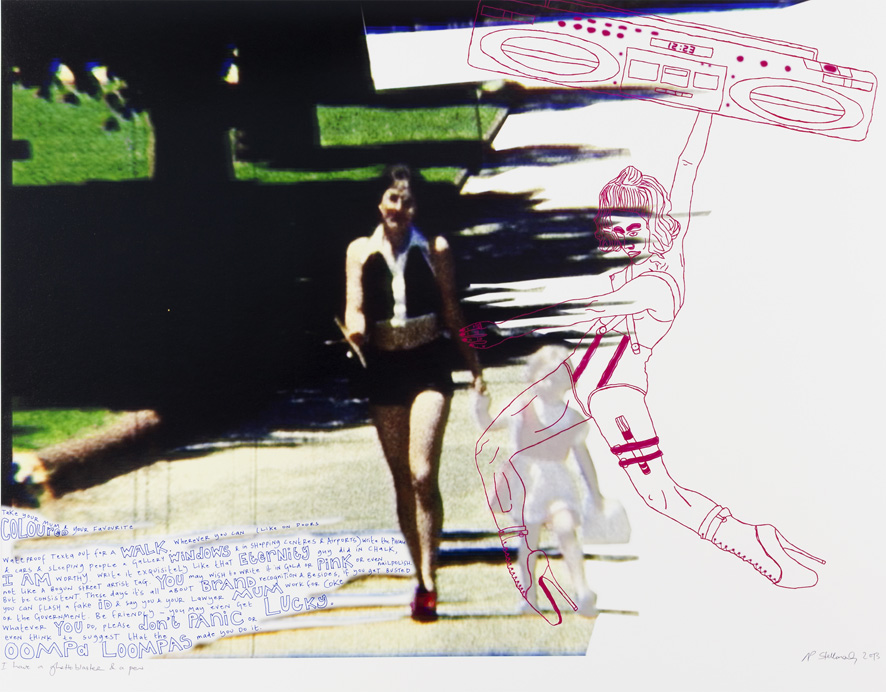
Natascha Stellmach, I Have a Ghettoblaster and a Pen, 2013

Natascha Stellmach (born 1970 in Melbourne, Australia) is an Australian artist.

== Biography ==
After completing a Bachelor of Applied Science (OT) at Melbourne's La Trobe University in 1991, Natascha Stellmach worked part-time as a therapist in community health and pain management while making and exhibiting short films. From 1997 to 1999 she then went on to study photography at RMIT University in Melbourne. In 2018 she graduated from The University of Melbourne with a Master of Fine Arts (Interdisciplinary Practice) through research into her longstanding project, “The Letting Go”. She lives between Melbourne and Berlin.

== Work ==
Natascha Stellmach works with image and text, across a range of media including installation art and happening. ”Stellmach’s dark investigations are a dance of image and text, in which hidden, emotive worlds are brought to life.” Her works ”blend documentary and fiction with a strong personal voice, utilising a constellation of media to tell intimate stories about the transience of life. It is this consistent interest in the emotional layers of her conceptual works that sets her apart.” Her work is often provocative and influenced by popculture. Amy Barrett-Lennard, director of the Perth Institute of Contemporary Arts, Australia writes: "Stellmach’s works at first appear delicate and personal, familiarly archival even, yet they soon take us into dark terrain––violence, war, suicide, death. She invites us to share in a taboo, an unspeakable subject around which she has built a narrative. These tales are supported, it seems, by documentary evidence, yet are deliberately confusing in their authenticity.”

Her works were shown at dOCUMENTA (13), the thirteenth edition of the quinquennial contemporary art exhibition.

== Books ==
- Natascha Stellmach: The Book of Back. Berlin 2007. ISBN 978-3-932754-82-1.
- Natascha Stellmach: It is Black in Here. Berlin 2010, ISBN 978-3-932193-04-0.
