= 2005–06 Polish Volleyball League =

- League: Polish Volleyball League
- Sport: Volleyball
- Duration: 15 October 2005 – 23 April 2006
- Number of teams: 10
- League champions: BOT Skra Bełchatów (2nd title)

Seasons
- ← 2004–05 2006–07 →

The 2005–06 Polish Volleyball League was the 70th season of the Polish Volleyball Championship, the 6th season as a professional league organized by the Professional Volleyball League SA (Polish: Profesjonalna Liga Piłki Siatkowej SA) under the supervision of the Polish Volleyball Federation (Polish: Polski Związek Piłki Siatkowej).

BOT Skra Bełchatów won their 2nd title of the Polish Champions.

== Regular season ==
Pos	Team	Pld	W	L	Pts	SW	SL	SR	SPW	SPL	SPR	Qualification
1	BOT Skra Bełchatów	18	16	2	48	49	10	4.900	1455	1231	1.182	Playoffs
2	Wkręt–met Domex AZS Częstochowa	18	15	3	43	46	17	2.706	1493	1330	1.123	Playoffs
3	Jastrzębski Węgiel	18	14	4	42	45	17	2.647	1488	1314	1.132	Playoffs
4	PZU AZS Olsztyn	18	13	5	41	44	17	2.588	1457	1281	1.137	Playoffs
5	Resovia	18	8	10	24	32	37	0.865	1515	1556	0.974	Playoffs
6	Mostostal Azoty Kędzierzyn-Koźle	18	7	11	19	26	41	0.634	1496	1534	0.975	Playoffs
7	Wózki BT AZS Politechnika Warszawska	18	6	12	18	24	45	0.533	1451	1582	0.917	Playoffs
8	Gwardia Wrocław	18	5	13	14	24	46	0.522	1475	1650	0.894	Playoffs
9	VKS Joker Piła	18	4	14	13	19	46	0.413	1382	1544	0.895	
10	PKE Polska Energia Sosnowiec	18	2	16	8	15	48	0.313	1306	1496	0.873	

Source: PlusLiga

== Playoffs ==
- (to 3 victories)

Quarterfinals
1	BOT Skra Bełchatów	3
8	Gwardia Wrocław	1
5	Resovia	1
4	PZU AZS Olsztyn	3
3	Jastrzębski Węgiel	3
6	Mostostal Azoty Kędzierzyn-Koźle	0
7	Wózki BT AZS Politechnika Warszawska	0
2	Wkręt–met Domex AZS Częstochowa	3

Semifinals
1	BOT Skra Bełchatów	3
4	PZU AZS Olsztyn	1
3	Jastrzębski Węgiel	3
2	Wkręt–met Domex AZS Częstochowa	0

Finals
1	BOT Skra Bełchatów	3
3	Jastrzębski Węgiel	1

== Final standings ==
Qualified for the 2006–07 CEV Champions League
Qualified for the 2006–07 CEV Top Teams Cup
Qualified for the 2006–07 CEV Cup
Playoffs with the 2nd team from the 1st league
Relegation to the 1st league

Rank	Team
1st place, gold medalist(s)	BOT Skra Bełchatów
2nd place, silver medalist(s)	Jastrzębski Węgiel
3rd place, bronze medalist(s)	PZU AZS Olsztyn
4	Wkręt–met Domex AZS Częstochowa
5	Wózki BT AZS Politechnika Warszawska
6	Gwardia Wrocław
7	Resovia
8	Mostostal Azoty Kędzierzyn-Koźle
9	VKS Joker Piła
10	PKE Polska Energia Sosnowiec

2006 Polish Champions
BOT Skra Bełchatów
2nd title
