= 2006–07 Polish Volleyball League =

- League: Polish Volleyball League
- Sport: Volleyball
- Duration: 15 December 2006 – 18 May 2007
- Number of teams: 10
- League champions: BOT Skra Bełchatów (3rd title)

Seasons
- ← 2005–06 2007–08 →

The 2006–07 Polish Volleyball League was the 71st season of the Polish Volleyball Championship, the 7th season as a professional league organized by the Professional Volleyball League SA (Polish: Profesjonalna Liga Piłki Siatkowej SA) under the supervision of the Polish Volleyball Federation (Polish: Polski Związek Piłki Siatkowej).

BOT Skra Bełchatów won their 3rd title of the Polish Champions.

== Regular season ==
Pos	Team	Pld	W	L	Pts	SW	SL	SR	SPW	SPL	SPR	Qualification
1	BOT Skra Bełchatów	18	17	1	49	52	15	3.467	1659	1490	1.113	Playoffs
2	PZU AZS Olsztyn	18	14	4	43	46	18	2.556	1534	1363	1.125	Playoffs
3	Jastrzębski Węgiel	18	11	7	35	41	26	1.577	1570	1434	1.095	Playoffs
4	Wkręt–met Domex AZS Częstochowa	18	11	7	31	43	34	1.265	1784	1659	1.075	Playoffs
5	Asseco Resovia	18	9	9	28	37	34	1.088	1539	1574	0.978	Playoffs
6	Mostostal Azoty Kędzierzyn-Koźle	18	7	11	23	29	36	0.806	1443	1502	0.961	Playoffs
7	Jadar Sport Radom	18	6	12	19	26	43	0.605	1471	1584	0.929	Playoffs
8	J.W. Construction AZS Politechnika Warszawska	18	7	11	17	29	46	0.630	1589	1710	0.929	Playoffs
9	Delecta Bydgoszcz	18	5	13	16	24	43	0.558	1502	1569	0.957	
10	EnergiaPro Gwardia Wrocław	18	3	15	9	16	48	0.333	1314	1520	0.864	

Source: PlusLiga

== Playoffs ==
- (to 3 victories)

Quarterfinals
1	BOT Skra Bełchatów	3
8	J.W. Construction AZS Politechnika Warszawska	0
5	Asseco Resovia	0
4	Wkręt–met Domex AZS Częstochowa	3
3	Jastrzębski Węgiel	3
6	Mostostal Azoty Kędzierzyn-Koźle	2
7	Jadar Sport Radom	0
2	PZU AZS Olsztyn	3

Semifinals
1	BOT Skra Bełchatów	3
4	Wkręt–met Domex AZS Częstochowa	0
3	Jastrzębski Węgiel	3
2	PZU AZS Olsztyn	1

Finals
1	BOT Skra Bełchatów	3
3	Jastrzębski Węgiel	2

== Final standings ==
Qualified for the 2007–08 CEV Champions League
Qualified for the 2007–08 CEV Cup
Qualified for the 2007–08 CEV Challenge Cup
Playoffs with the 2nd team from the 1st league
Relegation to the 1st league

Rank	Team
1st place, gold medalist(s)	BOT Skra Bełchatów
2nd place, silver medalist(s)	Jastrzębski Węgiel
3rd place, bronze medalist(s)	PZU AZS Olsztyn
4	Wkręt–met Domex AZS Częstochowa
5	Asseco Resovia
6	Mostostal Azoty Kędzierzyn-Koźle
7	Jadar Sport Radom
8	J.W. Construction AZS Politechnika Warszawska
9	Delecta Bydgoszcz
10	EnergiaPro Gwardia Wrocław

2007 Polish Champions
BOT Skra Bełchatów
3rd title
