= 2004–05 Polish Volleyball League =

- League: Polish Volleyball League
- Sport: Volleyball
- Duration: 16 October 2004 – 30 April 2005
- Number of teams: 10
- League champions: Skra Bełchatów (1st title)

Seasons
- ← 2003–04 2005–06 →

The 2004–05 Polish Volleyball League was the 69th season of the Polish Volleyball Championship, the 5th season as a professional league organized by the Professional Volleyball League SA (Polish: Profesjonalna Liga Piłki Siatkowej SA) under the supervision of the Polish Volleyball Federation (Polish: Polski Związek Piłki Siatkowej).

BOT Skra Bełchatów won their 1st title of the Polish Champions.

== Regular season ==
Pos	Team	Pld	W	L	Pts	SW	SL	SR	SPW	SPL	SPR	Qualification
1	Skra Bełchatów	18	15	3	45	49	16	3.063	1547	1397	1.107	Playoffs
2	Pamapol Domex AZS Częstochowa	18	15	3	44	48	16	3.000	1567	1395	1.123	Playoffs
3	PZU AZS Olsztyn	18	14	4	42	47	23	2.043	1651	1466	1.126	Playoffs
4	Jastrzębski Węgiel	18	11	7	32	38	26	1.462	1517	1383	1.097	Playoffs
5	Mostostal Azoty Kędzierzyn-Koźle	18	9	9	26	36	35	1.029	1590	1597	0.996	Playoffs
6	AZS Politechnika Warszawska	18	8	10	25	34	39	0.872	1623	1629	0.996	Playoffs
7	KP Polska Energia Sosnowiec	18	6	12	20	29	41	0.707	1522	1606	0.948	Playoffs
8	Resovia	18	7	11	19	24	40	0.600	1409	1496	0.942	Playoffs
9	Górnik Radlin	18	4	14	13	15	46	0.326	1267	1449	0.874	
10	AZS PWSZ Nysa	18	1	17	4	14	52	0.269	1325	1600	0.828	

Source: PlusLiga

== Playoffs ==
- (to 3 victories)

Quarterfinals
1	Skra Bełchatów	3
8	Resovia	0
5	Mostostal Azoty Kędzierzyn-Koźle	0
4	Jastrzębski Węgiel	3
3	PZU AZS Olsztyn	3
6	AZS Politechnika Warszawska	0
7	KP Polska Energia Sosnowiec	0
2	Pamapol Domex AZS Częstochowa	3

Semifinals
1	Skra Bełchatów	3
4	Jastrzębski Węgiel	1
3	PZU AZS Olsztyn	3
2	Pamapol Domex AZS Częstochowa	0

Finals
1	Skra Bełchatów	3
3	PZU AZS Olsztyn	0

== Final standings ==
Qualified for the 2005–06 CEV Champions League
Qualified for the 2005–06 CEV Top Teams Cup
Qualified for the 2005–06 CEV Cup
Playoffs with the 2nd team from the 1st league
Relegation to the 1st league

Rank	Team
1st place, gold medalist(s)	Skra Bełchatów
2nd place, silver medalist(s)	PZU AZS Olsztyn
3rd place, bronze medalist(s)	Pamapol Domex AZS Częstochowa
4	Jastrzębski Węgiel
5	Mostostal Azoty Kędzierzyn-Koźle
6	AZS Politechnika Warszawska
7	Resovia
8	KP Polska Energia Sosnowiec
9	AZS PWSZ Nysa
10	Górnik Radlin

2005 Polish Champions
Skra Bełchatów
1st title
