= Polish Men's Volleyball League =

Top men's volleyball league in Poland

- Upcoming season or competition: 2026–27 Tauron Liga
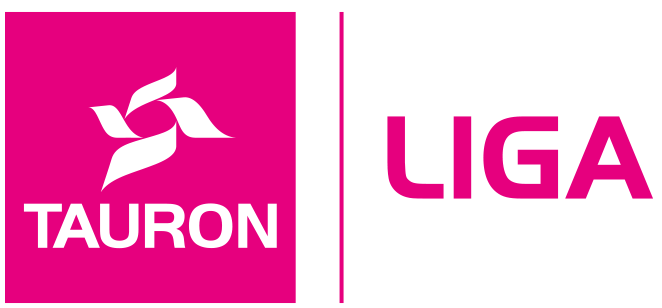
- Sport: Volleyball
- Founded: 30 June 2000; 26 years ago
- First season: 2000–01
- President: Artur Popko
- Administrator: PLS SA
- No. of teams: 14
- Country: Poland
- Confederation: CEV
- Most recent champion: Warta Zawiercie (1st title) (2025–26)
- Most titles: Skra Bełchatów (9 titles)
- Broadcaster: Polsat Sport
- Streaming partners: Volleyball World; Polsat Box Go
- Sponsor: Tauron Polska Energia
- Relegation to: Tauron 1. Liga
- Domestic cups: Polish Cup; Polish SuperCup
- International cups: CEV Champions League; CEV Cup; CEV Challenge Cup
- Website: tauronliga.pl

The Polish Men's Volleyball League, officially known as the Tauron Liga due to its sponsorship by Tauron, is the highest level of men's volleyball in Poland, a professional league competition featuring volleyball clubs located in this country. It is overseen by Polska Liga Siatkówki SA (PLS SA). It is currently a 14 teams league from October to April/May. The regular season is followed by playoffs, with the winner earning the Polish Championship (Polish: Mistrzostwo Polski). It is one of the best volleyball leagues in Europe, being highly ranked in the international competitions.

The league in its current form was founded in 2000 and was originally known as Polska Liga Siatkówki (Polish Volleyball League). From 2008 to 2026, for nearly 20 years, it was called PlusLiga after a mobile phone network brand, Plus. Since 2026 it is named Tauron Liga.

== Champions ==
Polish Volleyball Championship

- 1929 : YMCA Łódź
- 1930 : AZS Warsaw
- 1931 : ŁKS Łódź
- 1932 : ŁKS Łódź
- 1933 : KS Cracovia
- 1934 : AZS Warsaw
- 1935 : AZS Warsaw
- 1937 : Polonia Warsaw
- 1938 : AZS Wilno
- 1939 : Sokół II Lwów
- 1946 : Społem Warsaw
- 1947 : AZS Warsaw
- 1948 : AZS Wrocław
- 1949 : AZS Warsaw
- 1950 : AZS Wrocław
- 1952 : AZS AWF Warsaw
- 1953 : AZS AWF Warsaw

Polish Volleyball League (Klasa wydzielona, Ekstraklasa, 1 liga Seria A)

- 1954 : AZS AWF Warsaw
- 1955 : AZS AWF Warsaw
- 1956 : AZS AWF Warsaw
- 1957 : AZS AWF Warsaw
- 1958 : AZS AWF Warsaw
- 1959 : AZS AWF Warsaw
- 1960 : AZS AWF Warsaw
- 1961 : AZS AWF Warsaw
- 1962 : Legia Warsaw
- 1963 : AZS AWF Warsaw
- 1964 : Legia Warsaw
- 1965 : AZS AWF Warsaw
- 1966 : AZS AWF Warsaw
- 1967 : Legia Warsaw
- 1968 : AZS AWF Warsaw
- 1969 : Legia Warsaw
- 1970 : Legia Warsaw
- 1971 : Resovia
- 1972 : Resovia
- 1973 : AZS Olsztyn
- 1974 : Resovia
- 1975 : Resovia
- 1976 : AZS Olsztyn
- 1977 : Płomień Milowice
- 1978 : AZS Olsztyn
- 1979 : Płomień Milowice
- 1980 : Gwardia Wrocław
- 1981 : Gwardia Wrocław
- 1982 : Gwardia Wrocław
- 1983 : Legia Warsaw
- 1984 : Legia Warsaw
- 1985 : Stal Stocznia Szczecin
- 1986 : Legia Warsaw
- 1987 : Stal Stocznia Szczecin
- 1988 : Hutnik Nowa Huta
- 1989 : Hutnik Nowa Huta
- 1990 : AZS Częstochowa
- 1991 : AZS Olsztyn
- 1992 : AZS Olsztyn
- 1993 : AZS Częstochowa
- 1994 : AZS Częstochowa
- 1995 : AZS Częstochowa
- 1996 : Płomień Sosnowiec
- 1997 : AZS Częstochowa
- 1998 : Mostostal Azoty Kędzierzyn-Koźle
- 1999 : AZS Częstochowa
- 2000 : Mostostal Azoty Kędzierzyn-Koźle

Polish Professional Volleyball League (Polish Volleyball League, PlusLiga, Tauron Liga)

- 2001 : Mostostal Azoty Kędzierzyn-Koźle
- 2002 : Mostostal Azoty Kędzierzyn-Koźle
- 2003 : Mostostal Azoty Kędzierzyn-Koźle
- 2004 : Ivett Jastrzębie Borynia
- 2005 : Skra Bełchatów
- 2006 : BOT Skra Bełchatów
- 2007 : BOT Skra Bełchatów
- 2008 : PGE Skra Bełchatów
- 2009 : PGE Skra Bełchatów
- 2010 : PGE Skra Bełchatów
- 2011 : PGE Skra Bełchatów
- 2012 : Asseco Resovia
- 2013 : Asseco Resovia
- 2014 : PGE Skra Bełchatów
- 2015 : Asseco Resovia
- 2016 : ZAKSA Kędzierzyn-Koźle
- 2017 : ZAKSA Kędzierzyn-Koźle
- 2018 : PGE Skra Bełchatów
- 2019 : ZAKSA Kędzierzyn-Koźle
- 2021 : Jastrzębski Węgiel
- 2022 : ZAKSA Kędzierzyn-Koźle
- 2023 : Jastrzębski Węgiel
- 2024 : Jastrzębski Węgiel
- 2025 : Bogdanka LUK Lublin
- 2026 : Warta Zawiercie

== Teams ==
Location of the 2026–27 Tauron Liga teams.
- The following teams will compete in the Tauron Liga during the 2026–27 season:

	Team	Arena	Capacity
1	Warta Zawiercie	Hala OSiR II	1,500
2	Bogdanka LUK Lublin	Hala Globus	4,221
3	Projekt Warsaw	Hala Torwar	5,804
4	Asseco Resovia	Hala Podpromie	4,304
5	Skra Bełchatów	Hala Energia	2,700
6	AZS Olsztyn	Hala Urania	4,046
7	ZAKSA Kędzierzyn-Koźle	Hala Azoty	3,375
8	Trefl Gdańsk	Ergo Arena	11,200
9	Ślepsk Suwałki	Suwałki Arena	2,299
10	Jastrzębie Barkom	HWS Jastrzębie	3,112
11	Stilon Gorzów	Arena Gorzów	5,191
12	ChKS Chełm	Hala MOSiR Chełm	1,500
13	Norwid Częstochowa	Hala Częstochowa	6,800
14	GKS Katowice	Arena Katowice	3,002

== Total titles won ==
Club	Titles	Years
Skra Bełchatów	9	2005, 2006, 2007, 2008, 2009, 2010, 2011, 2014, 2018
ZAKSA Kędzierzyn-Koźle	7	2001, 2002, 2003, 2016, 2017, 2019, 2022
Jastrzębski Węgiel	4	2004, 2021, 2023, 2024
Resovia	3	2012, 2013, 2015
LKPS Lublin	1	2025
Warta Zawiercie	1	2026

== See also ==
- Polish Men's Volleyball Cup
- Polish Men's Volleyball SuperCup
- Best Player in PlusLiga
