= 2007–08 Polish Volleyball League =

- League: Polish Volleyball League
- Sport: Volleyball
- Duration: 28 September 2007 – 18 April 2008
- Number of teams: 10
- League champions: PGE Skra Bełchatów (4th title)

Seasons
- ← 2006–07 2008–09 →

The 2007–08 Polish Volleyball League was the 72nd season of the Polish Volleyball Championship, the 8th season as a professional league organized by the Professional Volleyball League SA (Polish: Profesjonalna Liga Piłki Siatkowej SA) under the supervision of the Polish Volleyball Federation (Polish: Polski Związek Piłki Siatkowej).

PGE Skra Bełchatów won their 4th title of the Polish Champions.

== Regular season ==
Pos	Team	Pld	W	L	Pts	SW	SL	SR	SPW	SPL	SPR	Qualification
1	PGE Skra Bełchatów	18	16	2	47	52	17	3.059	1626	1416	1.148	Playoffs
2	Wkręt–met Domex AZS Częstochowa	18	13	5	40	45	21	2.143	1539	1426	1.079	Playoffs
3	Jastrzębski Węgiel	18	13	5	37	45	26	1.731	1642	1543	1.064	Playoffs
4	Mlekpol AZS Olsztyn	18	11	7	32	41	27	1.519	1534	1433	1.070	Playoffs
5	Asseco Resovia	18	10	8	28	34	35	0.971	1458	1553	0.939	Playoffs
6	ZAKSA Kędzierzyn-Koźle	18	10	8	28	33	37	0.892	1560	1552	1.005	Playoffs
7	Jadar Radom	18	5	13	18	27	43	0.628	1546	1599	0.967	Playoffs
8	Płomień Sosnowiec	18	4	14	15	23	46	0.500	1445	1585	0.912	Playoffs
9	J.W. Construction Osram AZS Politechnika Warszawska	18	4	14	13	23	44	0.523	1435	1505	0.953	
10	Delecta Bydgoszcz	18	4	14	12	20	47	0.426	1388	1561	0.889	

Source: PlusLiga

== Playoffs ==
- (to 3 victories)

Quarterfinals
1	PGE Skra Bełchatów	3
8	Płomień Sosnowiec	1
5	Asseco Resovia	2
4	Mlekpol AZS Olsztyn	3
3	Jastrzębski Węgiel	3
6	ZAKSA Kędzierzyn-Koźle	1
7	Jadar Sport Radom	0
2	Wkręt–met Domex AZS Częstochowa	3

Semifinals
1	PGE Skra Bełchatów	3
4	Mlekpol AZS Olsztyn	1
3	Jastrzębski Węgiel	2
2	Wkręt–met Domex AZS Częstochowa	3

Finals
1	PGE Skra Bełchatów	3
2	Wkręt–met Domex AZS Częstochowa	0

== Final standings ==
Qualified for the 2008–09 CEV Champions League
Qualified for the 2008–09 CEV Cup
Qualified for the 2008–09 CEV Challenge Cup
Playoffs with the 2nd team from the 1st league
Relegation to the 1st league

Rank	Team
1st place, gold medalist(s)	PGE Skra Bełchatów
2nd place, silver medalist(s)	Wkręt–met Domex AZS Częstochowa
3rd place, bronze medalist(s)	Mlekpol AZS Olsztyn
4	Jastrzębski Węgiel
5	Asseco Resovia
6	ZAKSA Kędzierzyn-Koźle
7	Płomień Sosnowiec
8	Jadar Sport Radom
9	J.W. Construction Osram AZS Politechnika Warszawska
10	Delecta Bydgoszcz

2008 Polish Champions
PGE Skra Bełchatów
4th title
