= Polish Men's Volleyball Cup =

- Most recent season or competition: 2025–26 Polish Men's Volleyball Cup
- Sport: Volleyball
- Founded: 1932
- Country: Poland
- Most recent champion: LKPS Lublin (1st title)
- Most titles: ZAKSA Kędzierzyn-Koźle (10 titles)
- Broadcaster: Polsat Sport
- Website: Polish Cup

The Polish Men's Volleyball Cup is an annual competition for volleyball clubs in Poland. It is overseen by the Polish Volleyball Federation (Polish: Polski Związek Piłki Siatkowej) and the Professional Volleyball League SA (Polish: Profesjonalna Liga Piłki Siatkowej SA) (since 2000). The tournament was established in 1932 and takes place every year (with a few exceptions, not held in: 1937–1949, 1955–1959, 1962–1969, 1980, 2020).

== Winners ==
Season	Venue	Final
Season	Venue	Champion	Score	Runner–up
2000–01	Kędzierzyn-Koźle	Mostostal Azoty Kędzierzyn-Koźle	3–0 (25:15, 25:19, 25:23)	AZS Częstochowa
2001–02	Wieluń	Mostostal Azoty Kędzierzyn-Koźle	3–2 (25:23, 26:28, 25:15, 22:25, 15:9)	AZS Częstochowa
2002–03	Sosnowiec	Płomień Sosnowiec	3–0 (25:14, 25:21, 25:17)	Morze Szczecin
2003–04	Bełchatów	Płomień Sosnowiec	3–1 (25:14, 20:25, 25:20, 25:20)	Skra Bełchatów
2004–05	Olsztyn	Skra Bełchatów	3–1 (17:25, 25:23, 25:23, 25:16)	PZU AZS Olsztyn
2005–06	Warsaw	BOT Skra Bełchatów	3–0 (25:22, 25:21, 25:18)	AZS Częstochowa
2006–07	Kielce	BOT Skra Bełchatów	3–0 (25:23, 28:26, 25:17)	PZU AZS Olsztyn
2007–08	Poznań	AZS Częstochowa	3–1 (25:23, 25:22, 22:25, 32:30)	Jastrzębski Węgiel
2008–09	Kielce	PGE Skra Bełchatów	3–0 (25:20, 25:21, 25:20)	AZS UWM Olsztyn
2009–10	Bydgoszcz	Jastrzębski Węgiel	3–2 (25:22, 22:25, 25:23, 22:25, 15:13)	Asseco Resovia
2010–11	Warsaw	PGE Skra Bełchatów	3–0 (25:19, 26:24, 25:18)	ZAKSA Kędzierzyn-Koźle
2011–12	Rzeszów	PGE Skra Bełchatów	3–0 (25:16, 25:20, 25:19)	Jastrzębski Węgiel
2012–13; Details	Częstochowa	ZAKSA Kędzierzyn-Koźle	3–1 (19:25, 25:18, 25:21, 25:23)	Asseco Resovia
2013–14; Details	Zielona Góra	ZAKSA Kędzierzyn-Koźle	3–1 (25:23, 18:25, 25:18, 25:17)	Jastrzębski Węgiel
2014–15; Details	Gdańsk/Sopot	Lotos Trefl Gdańsk	3–1 (25:22, 21:25, 25:21, 25:23)	Asseco Resovia
2015–16; Details	Wrocław	PGE Skra Bełchatów	3–2 (12:25, 25:23, 22:25, 28:26, 19:17)	ZAKSA Kędzierzyn-Koźle
2016–17; Details	Wrocław	ZAKSA Kędzierzyn-Koźle	3–1 (29:27, 25:27, 25:20, 25:18)	PGE Skra Bełchatów
2017–18; Details	Wrocław	Trefl Gdańsk	3–0 (25:21, 25:22, 25:22)	PGE Skra Bełchatów
2018–19; Details	Wrocław	ZAKSA Kędzierzyn-Koźle	3–1 (25:20, 25:13, 25:27, 25:17)	Jastrzębski Węgiel
2020–21; Details	Kraków	ZAKSA Kędzierzyn-Koźle	3–0 (25:20, 27:25, 25:15)	Jastrzębski Węgiel
2021–22; Details	Wrocław	ZAKSA Kędzierzyn-Koźle	3–0 (25:20, 25:15, 25:19)	Jastrzębski Węgiel
2022–23; Details	Kraków	ZAKSA Kędzierzyn-Koźle	3–0 (26:24, 29:27, 25:23)	Jastrzębski Węgiel
2023–24; Details	Kraków	Aluron CMC Warta Zawiercie	3–1 (25:22, 20:25, 25:21, 25:20)	Jastrzębski Węgiel
2024–25; Details	Kraków	Jastrzębski Węgiel	3–1 (18:25, 25:22, 25:22, 30:28)	Aluron CMC Warta Zawiercie
2025–26; Details	Kraków	Bogdanka LUK Lublin	3–0 (25:15, 25:20, 25:20)	Asseco Resovia

== Total titles won ==
Club	Titles	Years
ZAKSA Kędzierzyn-Koźle	10	2000, 2001, 2002, 2013, 2014, 2017, 2019, 2021, 2022, 2023
AZS Olsztyn	7	1970, 1971, 1972, 1982, 1989, 1991, 1992
Skra Bełchatów	7	2005, 2006, 2007, 2009, 2011, 2012, 2016
Legia Warsaw	5	1952, 1961, 1984, 1986, 1995
AZS Warsaw	3	1934, 1950, 1951
AZS AWF Warsaw	3	1953, 1953–54, 1954
Hutnik Kraków	3	1974, 1988, 1990
Resovia	3	1975, 1983, 1987
Beskid Andrychów	2	1973, 1978
AZS Częstochowa	2	1998, 2008
Płomień Sosnowiec	2	2003, 2004
Trefl Gdańsk	2	2015, 2018
Jastrzębski Węgiel	2	2010, 2025
ŁKS Łódź	1	1932
Sokół Macierz Lwów	1	1933
Cracovia	1	1935
YMCA Kraków	1	1936
Górnik Katowice	1	1960
Stal Mielec	1	1976
Posnania	1	1977
Resursa Łodź	1	1979
Gwardia Wrocław	1	1981
Płomień Milowice	1	1985
Chełmiec Wałbrzych	1	1993
BBTS Bielsko-Biała	1	1994
Stal Nysa	1	1996
Stilon Gorzów Wielkopolski	1	1997
Czarni Radom	1	1999
Warta Zawiercie	1	2024
LKPS Lublin	1	2026

== MVP by edition ==
- 2008–09 – Mariusz Wlazły (POL)
- 2009–10 – Pavel Abramov (RUS)
- 2010–11 – Mariusz Wlazły (POL)
- 2011–12 – Miguel Ángel Falasca (ESP)
- 2012–13 – Luiz Felipe Fonteles (BRA)
- 2013–14 – Paweł Zagumny (POL)
- 2014–15 – Mateusz Mika (POL)
- 2015–16 – Mariusz Wlazły (POL)
- 2016–17 – Dawid Konarski (POL)
- 2017–18 – Damian Schulz (POL)
- 2018–19 – Aleksander Śliwka (POL)
- 2020–21 – Kamil Semeniuk (POL)
- 2021–22 – Marcin Janusz (POL)
- 2022–23 – Aleksander Śliwka (POL)
- 2023–24 – Miłosz Zniszczoł (POL)
- 2024–25 – Tomasz Fornal (POL)
- 2025–26 – Kewin Sasak (POL)

== See also ==
- Polish Men's Volleyball League
- Polish Men's Volleyball SuperCup
