= Morze Bałtyk Szczecin =

Polish volleyball club

KS Morze Bałtyk Szczecin
- Full name: Klub Sportowy; Morze Bałtyk Szczecin
- Founded: 1973
- Dissolved: 2014
- Ground: Szczeciński Dom Sportu ul. Wąska 16; 71–415 Szczecin

KS Morze Bałtyk Szczecin was a Polish volleyball team based in Szczecin, founded in 1973. Two–time Polish Champion (1985, 1987). In 2014, the club was replaced by Espadon Szczecin, later known as Stocznia Szczecin.

== Honours ==
- Polish Championship

Winners (2): 1984–85, 1986–87

== Former names ==
Years	Name
1973–1993	KS Stal Stocznia Szczecin
1993–2014	KS Morze Bałtyk Szczecin
