= Gwardia Wrocław (men's volleyball) =

Polish volleyball club

- Full name: Gwardia Wrocław
- Short name: Gwardia
- Founded: 1948; 77 years ago
- Ground: Hala Orbita ul. Wejherowska 34; 54–239 Wrocław (Capacity: 3,000)
- Chairman: Łukasz Tobys
- Manager: Dawid Murek
- Captain: Arkadiusz Olczyk
- League: Tauron 1. Liga
- Website: Club home page

Uniforms
Home	Away

Gwardia Wrocław is a professional men's volleyball club based in Wrocław in southwestern Poland, founded in 1948. Three–time Polish Champion and one time Polish Cup winner. Since 2018, the club has been playing in the 1st Polish Volleyball League.

== Honours ==
- Polish Championship

Winners (3): 1979–80, 1980–81, 1981–82

- Polish Cup

Winners (1): 1980–81

== See also ==
- Gwardia Wrocław players
- Gwardia Wrocław coaches
