= Płomień Sosnowiec =

Polish volleyball club

- Full name: Uczniowski Klub Sportowy Miejskiego Ośrodka Sportowego Kazimierz Płomień Sosnowiec
- Founded: 1992
- Dissolved: 2015
- Ground: HWS Sosnowiec

Płomień Sosnowiec was a men's volleyball club based in Sosnowiec in southern Poland, founded in 1992. The successor of Płomień Milowice. One time Polish Champion (1996) and two–time Polish Cup winner (2003, 2004).

In 2008, due to financial problems, the club had to withdraw from the highest level of the Polish Volleyball League.

== Honours ==
- Polish Championship

Winners (1): 1995–96

- Polish Cup

Winners (2): 2002–03, 2003–04

== Former names ==
Years	Name
1992–1999	GKS Kazimierz Płomień Sosnowiec
1999–2002	GKS Kazimierz Płomień – Polska Energia Sosnowiec
2002–2006	KP Polska Energia SSA Sosnowiec
2006–2007	Płomień SSA Sosnowiec
2007–2008	Płomień SA Sosnowiec
2008–2011	UKS Kazimierz Płomień Sosnowiec
2011–	UKS MOS Kazimierz Płomień Sosnowiec
