= AZS Częstochowa =

Polish volleyball club

- Full name: Klub Sportowy AZS Częstochowa Sportowa Spółka Akcyjna
- Founded: 1945; 80 years ago
- Dissolved: 2019
- Ground: Hala Sportowa Częstochowa (Capacity: 6,356)

KS AZS Częstochowa SSA was a Polish professional men's volleyball club based in Częstochowa, founded in 1945 as a university team (AZS). They competed in the Polish top league from 1979 to 2017. During its existence, Częstochowa won 6 national league titles, 2 Polish Cups, and the CEV Challenge Cup in 2012.

== Honours ==
=== Domestic ===
- Polish Championship

Winners (6): 1989–90, 1992–93, 1993–94, 1994–95, 1996–97, 1998–99

- Polish Cup

Winners (2): 1997–98, 2007–08

=== International ===
- CEV Challenge Cup

Winners (1): 2011–12

== Former names ==
Years	Name
1945–1991	KU AZS Częstochowa
1991–1992	AZS Polsadoro Częstochowa
1992–1996	AZS Yawal Częstochowa
1996–1997	AZS Yawal Absolwent Częstochowa
1997–1998	AZS Yawal Częstochowa
1998–1999	Yawal Jurajska AZS Bank Częstochowa
1999–2001	Galaxia Jurajska AZS Bank Częstochowa
2001–2002	Galaxia Starter Bank Częstochowa AZS
2002–2003	Galaxia Pamapol Kaffee AZS Częstochowa
2003–2004	Pamapol AZS Częstochowa
2004–2005	Pamapol Domex AZS Częstochowa
2005–2008	Wkręt–met Domex AZS Częstochowa
2008–2010	Domex Tytan AZS Częstochowa
2010–2012	Tytan AZS Częstochowa
2012–2013	Wkręt–met AZS Częstochowa
2013–2018	AZS Częstochowa
2018–2019	Tauron AZS Częstochowa

== See also ==
- AZS Częstochowa players
- AZS Częstochowa coaches
