= 2026 Memorial of Hubert Jerzy Wagner =

Volleyball tournament

Tournament details
- Host country: Poland
- Dates: 28–30 August 2026
- Teams: 4
- Venue: 1 (in 1 host city)

Final positions
- Champions: Poland (12th title)
- Runners-up: France
- Third place: United States
- Fourth place: Slovenia

Tournament awards
- MVP: (Poland) Bartłomiej Bołądź
- Best Setter: (France) Antoine Brizard
- Best OH: (United States) Cooper Robinson
- Best MB: (Poland) Jakub Majchrzak
- Best OPP: (Poland) Bartłomiej Bołądź
- Best Libero: (France) Benjamin Diez

The XXIII Memorial of Hubert Jerzy Wagner was a volleyball tournament held at Tauron Arena in Kraków, Poland from 28 to 30 August 2026.

The 2026 edition of the tournament was held only two weeks before the 2026 EuroVolley.

== Qualification ==
All teams except the host must have received an invitation from the organizers.

Africa (CAVB)	Asia and Oceania (AVC)	Europe (CEV)	North, Central America and Caribbean (NORCECA)	South America (CSV)
		Host nation: Poland; Wild card: France; Slovenia	Wild card: United States	

== Participating teams ==
Team	Appearance			Best performance
Team	Last	Total	Streak	Best performance
Poland	2025	23	22	11× Champions (2006, 2008, 2009, 2012, 2013, 2015, 2017, 2018, 2021, 2022, 2024)
France	2023	6	2	1× Runner-up (2017)
Slovenia	2024	3	2	2× Runner-up (2023, 2024)
United States	N/A	1	0	debut (2026)

== Venue ==
Kraków, Poland
Tauron Arena
Capacity: 15,328
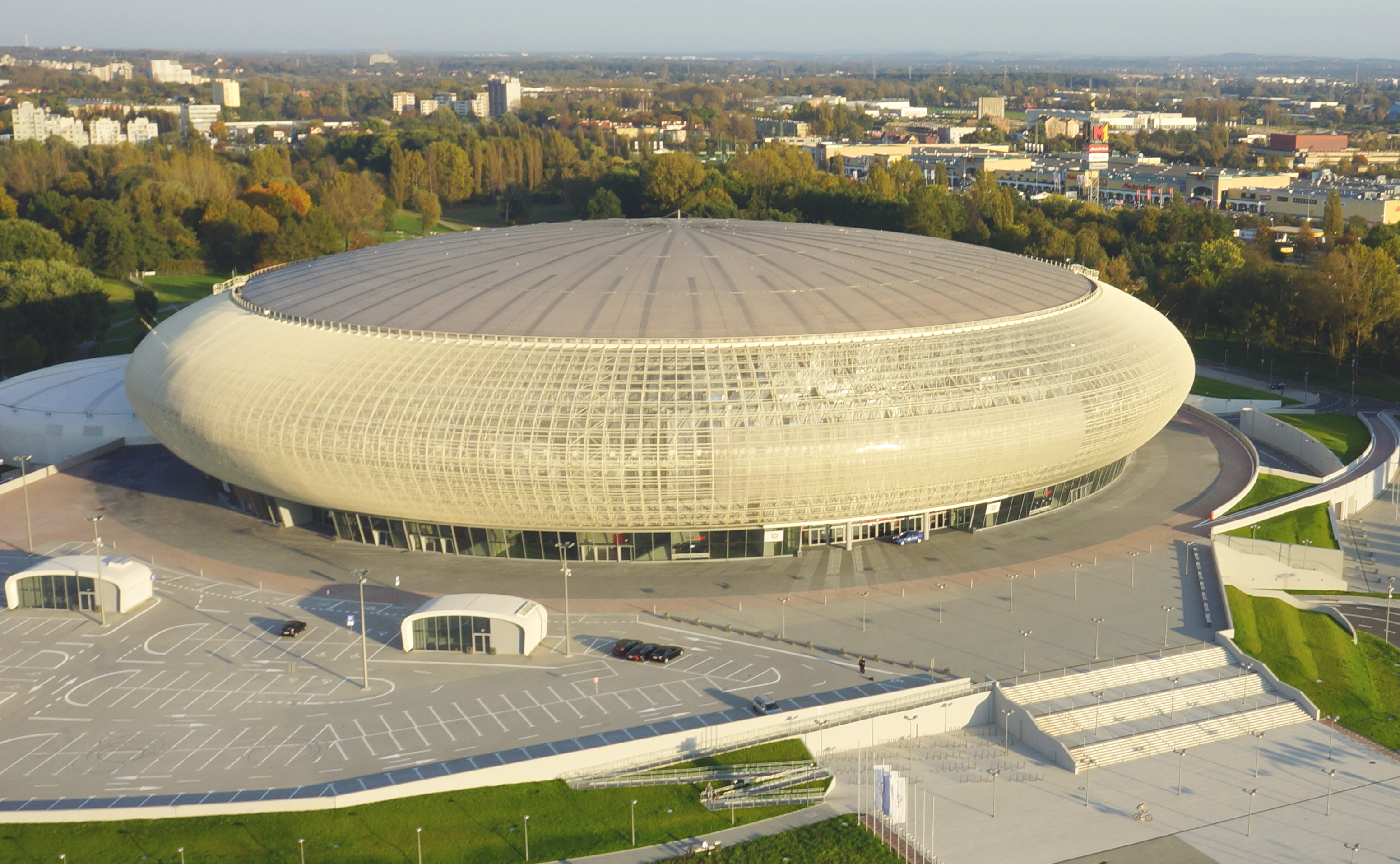

== Pool standing procedure ==
1. Number of matches won
2. Match points
3. Sets ratio
4. Points ratio
5. If the tie continues as per the point ratio between two teams, the priority will be given to the team which won the match between them. When the tie in points ratio is between three or more teams, a new classification of these teams in the terms of points 1, 2, 3 and 4 will be made taking into consideration only the matches in which they were opposed to each other.

Match won 3–0 or 3–1: 3 match points for the winner, 0 match points for the loser
Match won 3–2: 2 match points for the winner, 1 match point for the loser

== Results ==
All times are local Central European Summer Time (UTC+2).

=== Ranking ===
Pos	Team	Pld	W	L	Pts	SW	SL	SR	SPW	SPL	SPR
1	Poland	3	3	0	8	9	4	2.250	304	263	1.156
2	France	3	2	1	6	7	4	1.750	246	249	0.988
3	United States	3	1	2	2	4	8	0.500	265	286	0.927
4	Slovenia	3	0	3	2	5	9	0.556	297	314	0.946

Source: Flashscore

Date	Time		Score		Set 1	Set 2	Set 3	Set 4	Set 5	Total	Report
28 August	17:30	United States	0–3	France	26–28	21–25	23–25			70–78	Report
28 August	20:30	Poland	3–2	Slovenia	26–24	21–25	25–19	23–25	15–11	110–104	Report
29 August	14:00	France	3–1	Slovenia	16–25	25–21	25–15	25–21		91–82	Report
29 August	17:00	Poland	3–1	United States	22–25	25–15	25–20	25–22		97–82	Report
30 August	14:00	Slovenia	2–3	United States	30–28	26–28	25–17	19–25	11–15	111–113	Report
30 August	17:00	Poland	3–1	France	22–25	25–17	25–15	25–20		97–77	Report

== Final standing ==
Rank	Team
1st place, gold medalist(s)	Poland
2nd place, silver medalist(s)	France
3rd place, bronze medalist(s)	United States
4	Slovenia

2026 Memorial of Hubert Jerzy Wagner

Poland
12th title

14–man roster
Jakub Popiwczak, Marcin Komenda, Bartłomiej Lemański, Wilfredo León, Aleksander Śliwka (c), Artur Szalpuk, Kamil Semeniuk, Jakub Majchrzak, Maksymilian Granieczny, Tomasz Fornal, Bartłomiej Bołądź, Szymon Jakubiszak, Kewin Sasak, Jakub Nowak, Jan Firlej
Head coach
Nikola Grbić

== Awards ==
- Most valuable player
  (Poland) Bartłomiej Bołądź
- Best setter
  (France) Antoine Brizard
- Best outside hitter
  (United States) Cooper Robinson
- Best middle-blocker
  (Poland) Jakub Majchrzak
- Best opposite
  (Poland) Bartłomiej Bołądź
- Best libero
  (France) Benjamin Diez
