= 2025 Memorial of Hubert Jerzy Wagner squads =

This article shows the rosters of all participating teams at the 2025 edition of the Memorial of Hubert Jerzy Wagner, held in Kraków, Poland.

== Argentina ==
The following is Argentina's roster in the 2025 Memorial of Hubert Jerzy Wagner.

Head coach: (Argentina) Marcelo Méndez

- 1 Matías Sánchez S
- 3 Jan Martínez Franchi OH
- 4 Joaquín Gallego MB
- 6 Germán Gómez OP
- 7 Luciano Palonsky OH
- 8 Agustín Loser MB
- 9 Santiago Danani L
- 11 Manuel Armoa OH
- 12 Bruno Lima OP
- 15 Luciano De Cecco S
- 16 Pablo Kukartsev OH
- 17 Luciano Vicentín OH
- 22 Nicolás Zerba MB
- 23 Imanol Salazar MB
- 29 Ignacio Luengas OH
- 77 Matías Giraudo S

== Brazil ==
The following is Brazil's roster in the 2025 Memorial of Hubert Jerzy Wagner.

Head coach: (Brazil) Bernardo Rezende

- 1 Alan Souza OP
- 5 Matheus Gonçalves S
- 6 Adriano Xavier OH
- 7 Matheus Santos MB
- 8 Henrique Honorato OH
- 11 Judson Cunha MB
- 14 Fernando Kreling S
- 15 Maique Nascimento L
- 18 Ricardo Lucarelli OH
- 19 Arthur Bento OH
- 20 Lukas Bergmann OH
- 23 Flávio Gualberto MB
- 25 Chizoba Atu OP
- 28 Darlan Souza OP

== Poland ==
The following is Poland's roster in the 2025 Memorial of Hubert Jerzy Wagner.

Head coach: (Serbia) Nikola Grbić

- 3 Jakub Popiwczak L
- 4 Marcin Komenda S
- 6 Bartosz Kurek OP
- 8 Mateusz Czunkiewicz L
- 9 Wilfredo Leon OH
- 10 Bartosz Bednorz OH
- 12 Artur Szalpuk OH
- 15 Jakub Kochanowski MB
- 16 Kamil Semeniuk OH
- 17 Paweł Zatorski L
- 18 Masymilian Granieczny L
- 19 Marcin Janusz S
- 21 Tomasz Fornal OH
- 30 Bartłomiej Bołądź OP
- 34 Szymon Jakubiszak MB
- 35 Kewin Sasak OP
- 72 Mateusz Poręba MB
- 73 Jakub Nowak MB
- 96 Jan Firlej S
- 99 Norbert Huber MB

== Serbia ==
The following is Serbia's roster in the 2025 Memorial of Hubert Jerzy Wagner.

Head coach: (Romania) Gheorghe Crețu

- 1 Dušan Nikolić OP
- 3 Stefan Negić L
- 4 Veljko Mašulović OH
- 8 Marko Ivović OH
- 9 Nikola Jovović S
- 10 Miran Kujundžić OH
- 12 Pavle Perić OH
- 13 Vladimir Gajović MB
- 15 Nemanja Mašulović MB
- 16 Dražen Luburić OP
- 19 Aleksandar Stefanović MB
- 21 Vuk Todorović S
- 22 Nikola Brborić OH
- 29 Aleksandar Nedeljković MB
