= 2009 Memorial of Hubert Jerzy Wagner =

Tournament details
- Host country: Poland
- Dates: 20 – 23 August
- Teams: 6
- Venue: 1 (in 1 host city)

Final positions
- Champions: Poland (3rd title)
- Runners-up: Italy
- Third place: Serbia
- Fourth place: China

Tournament awards
- MVP: (Poland) Bartosz Kurek

The VII Memorial of Hubert Jerzy Wagner was held in Poland from 20 to 23 August 2009. Six teams participated in the tournament.

== Qualification ==
All teams except the host must receive an invitation from the organizers.

Africa (CAVB)	Asia and Oceania (AVC)	Europe (CEV)	North, Central America and Caribbean (NORCECA)	South America (CSV)
	Wild card: China	Host nation: Poland; Poland B Wild card: Spain; Serbia; Italy		

== Venue ==
Łódź, Poland
Atlas Arena
Capacity: 13,805
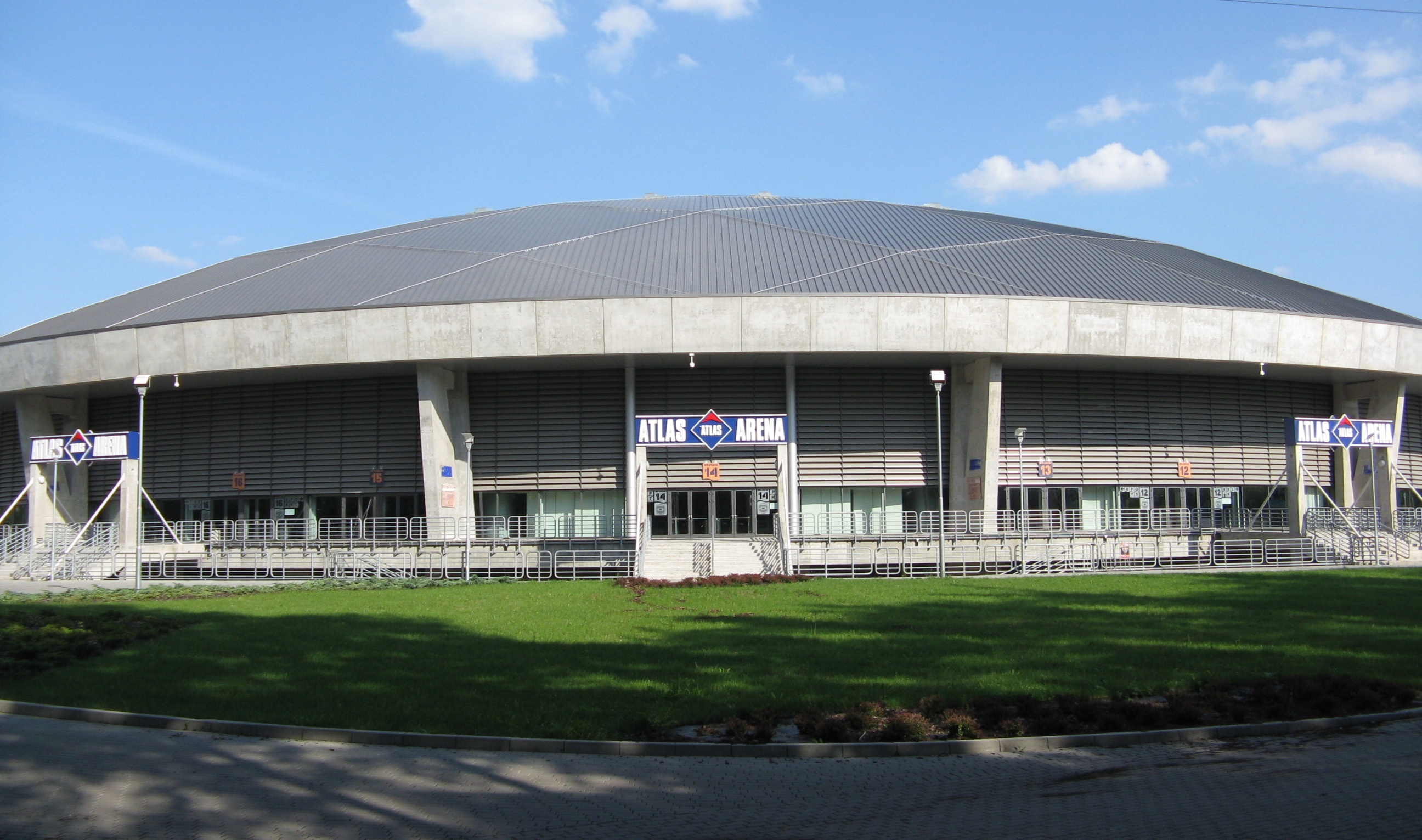

== Results ==
- All times are Central European Summer Time (UTC+02:00).

=== Pool A ===
Pos	Team	Pld	W	L	Pts	SPW	SPL	SPR	SW	SL	SR
1	Poland	2	2	0	6	193	174	1.109	6	2	3.000
2	China	2	1	1	3	182	182	1.000	4	4	1.000
3	Spain	2	0	2	0	178	197	0.904	2	6	0.333

Date	Time		Score		Set 1	Set 2	Set 3	Set 4	Set 5	Total	Report
20 Aug		Poland	3–1	Spain	23–25	25–22	25–21	25–23		98–91	Report
21 Aug		Poland	3–1	China	25–21	25–18	20–25	25–19		95–83	Report
22 Aug		Spain	1–3	China	26–24	18–25	21–25	22–25		87–99	Report

=== Pool B ===
Pos	Team	Pld	W	L	Pts	SPW	SPL	SPR	SW	SL	SR
1	Italy	2	2	0	6	184	162	1.136	6	2	3.000
2	Serbia	2	1	1	3	179	163	1.098	5	3	1.667
3	Poland B	2	0	2	0	114	150	0.760	0	6	0.000

Date	Time		Score		Set 1	Set 2	Set 3	Set 4	Set 5	Total	Report
20 Aug		Serbia	2–3	Italy	25–22	21–25	21–25	25–20	12–15	104–107	Report
21 Aug		Poland B	0–3	Italy	16–25	19–25	23–25			58–75	Report
22 Aug		Poland B	0–3	Serbia	20–25	17–25	19–25			56–75	Report

=== 5th place ===
Date	Time		Score		Set 1	Set 2	Set 3	Set 4	Set 5	Total	Report
23 Aug		Poland B	3–0	Spain	25–20	27–25	25–21			77–66	Report

=== 3rd place ===
Date	Time		Score		Set 1	Set 2	Set 3	Set 4	Set 5	Total	Report
23 Aug		China	2–3	Serbia	27–25	19–25	31–29	21–25	8–15	106–119	Report

=== Finale ===
Date	Time		Score		Set 1	Set 2	Set 3	Set 4	Set 5	Total	Report
23 Aug		Poland	3–1	Italy	25–17	25–19	17–25	25–18		92–79	Report

== Final standing ==
Rank	Team
1st place, gold medalist(s)	Poland
2nd place, silver medalist(s)	Italy
3rd place, bronze medalist(s)	Serbia
4	China
5	Poland B
6	Spain

2009 Memorial of Hubert Jerzy Wagner

Poland
3rd title

Nowakowski, Gruszka, Pliński, Zagumny, Kurek, Wika, Jarosz, Bartman, Gromadowski, Kadziewicz, Woicki, Ruciak, Gacek, Ignaczak, Bąkiewicz, Możdżonek, Łomacz
Head coach
Castellani

== Awards ==
- MVP: (Poland) Bartosz Kurek
- Best spiker: (Italy) Cristian Savani
- Best blocker: (Poland) Daniel Pliński
- Best server: (Serbia) Saša Starović
- Best setter: (Poland) Paweł Zagumny
- Best receiver (Italy) Matej Černič
- Best libero: (China) Ren Qi
