= 2025 Memorial of Hubert Jerzy Wagner =

Volleyball tournament

Tournament details
- Host country: Poland
- Dates: 29–31 August 2026
- Teams: 4
- Venue: 1 (in 1 host city)

Final positions
- Champions: Argentina (1st title)
- Runners-up: Brazil
- Third place: Poland
- Fourth place: Serbia

Tournament awards
- MVP: (Argentina) Pablo Kukartsev
- Best Setter: (Argentina) Matías Sánchez
- Best OH: (Brazil) Arthur Bento
- Best MB: (Argentina) Joaquín Gallego
- Best OPP: (Poland) Bartosz Kurek
- Best Libero: (Brazil) Maique Nascimento

The XXII Memorial of Hubert Jerzy Wagner was a volleyball tournament held at Tauron Arena in Kraków, Poland from 29 to 31 August 2025.

It was held a week before the 2025 FIVB World Championship.

== Qualification ==
All teams except the host must have received an invitation from the organizers.

Africa (CAVB)	Asia and Oceania (AVC)	Europe (CEV)	North, Central America and Caribbean (NORCECA)	South America (CSV)
		Host nation: Poland; Wild card: Serbia		Wild card: Argentina; Brazil

== Participating teams ==
Team	Appearance			Best performance
Team	Last	Total	Streak	Best performance
Poland	2024	22	21	11× Champions (2006, 2008, 2009, 2012, 2013, 2015, 2017, 2018, 2021, 2022, 2024)
Argentina	2022	3	1	1× Runner-up (2022)
Brazil	2019	3	1	2× Champions (2010, 2019)
Serbia	2023	5	1	1× Runner-up (2016)

== Venue ==
Kraków, Poland
Tauron Arena
Capacity: 15,328
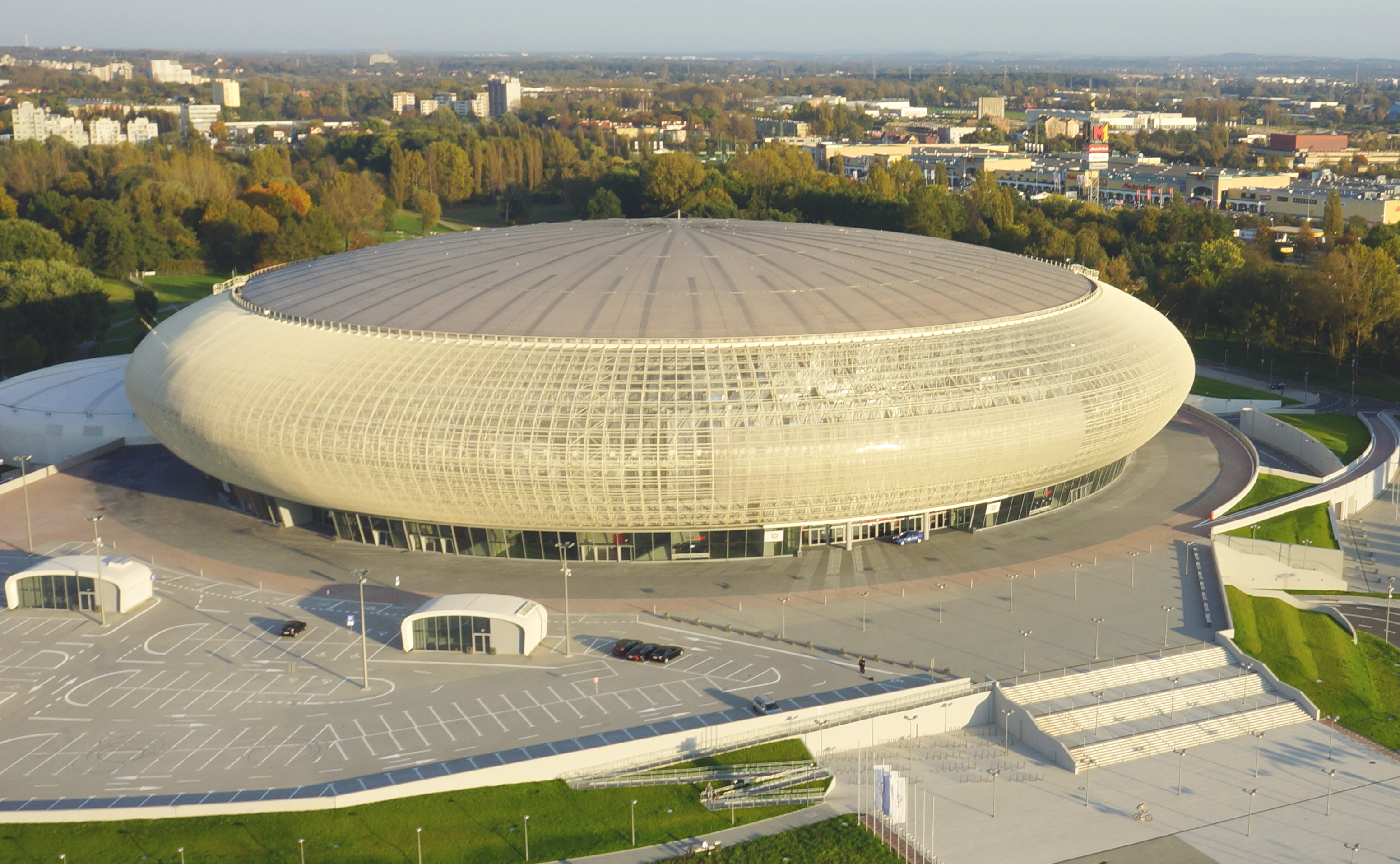

== Pool standing procedure ==
1. Number of matches won
2. Match points
3. Sets ratio
4. Points ratio
5. If the tie continues as per the point ratio between two teams, the priority will be given to the team which won the match between them. When the tie in points ratio is between three or more teams, a new classification of these teams in the terms of points 1, 2, 3 and 4 will be made taking into consideration only the matches in which they were opposed to each other.

Match won 3–0 or 3–1: 3 match points for the winner, 0 match points for the loser
Match won 3–2: 2 match points for the winner, 1 match point for the loser

== Results ==
All times are local Central European Summer Time (UTC+2).

=== Ranking ===
Pos	Team	Pld	W	L	Pts	SW	SL	SR	SPW	SPL	SPR
1	Argentina	3	3	0	9	9	1	9.000	247	206	1.199
2	Brazil	3	2	1	6	6	4	1.500	237	228	1.039
3	Poland	3	1	2	3	4	6	0.667	229	227	1.009
4	Serbia	3	0	3	0	1	9	0.111	197	249	0.791

Source: Flashscore

Date	Time		Score		Set 1	Set 2	Set 3	Set 4	Set 5	Total	Report
29 Aug	18:00	Argentina	3–0	Brazil	25–20	25–22	25–21			75–63	Report
29 Aug	20:30	Poland	3–0	Serbia	25–20	25–13	25–22			75–55	Report
30 Aug	18:00	Serbia	0–3	Argentina	20–25	18–25	17–25			55–75	Report
30 Aug	20:30	Poland	0–3	Brazil	23–25	20–25	23–25			66–75	Report
31 Aug	18:00	Brazil	3–1	Serbia	25–18	22–25	25–19	27–25		99–87	Report
31 Aug	20:30	Poland	1–3	Argentina	20–25	25–21	19–25	24–26		88–97	Report

== Final standing ==
Rank	Team
1st place, gold medalist(s)	Argentina
2nd place, silver medalist(s)	Brazil
3rd place, bronze medalist(s)	Poland
4	Serbia

2025 Memorial of Hubert Jerzy Wagner winners

Argentina
First title

Matías Sánchez, Jan Martínez Franchi, Joaquín Gallego, Germán Gómez, Luciano Palonsky, Agustín Loser, Santiago Danani (L), Manuel Armoa, Bruno Lima, Luciano De Cecco, Pablo Kukartsev, Luciano Vicentín, Nicolás Zerba, Imanol Salazar, Ignacio Luengas, Matías Giraudo
Head coach
Marcelo Méndez

== Awards ==
- Most valuable player
  (Argentina) Pablo Kukartsev
- Best setter
  (Argentina) Matías Sánchez
- Best receiver
  (Brazil) Arthur Bento
- Best blocker
  (Argentina) Joaquín Gallego
- Best spiker
  (Poland) Bartosz Kurek
- Best libero
  (Brazil) Maique Nascimento
