= Teodor Todorov =

Bulgarian volleyball player (born 1989)

Personal information
- Nationality: Bulgarian
- Born: 1 September 1989 (age 37); Montana, Bulgaria
- Height: 2.08 m (6 ft 10 in)
- Weight: 108 kg (238 lb)
- Spike: 365 cm (144 in)
- Block: 345 cm (136 in)

Volleyball information
- Position: Middle blocker
- Current club: CSKA Sofia
- Number: 14

Career
Years	Teams
2009–2011; 2011–2015; 2015–2016; 2017–	CSKA Sofia; Gazprom-Ugra Surgut; PV Lugano; CSKA Sofia

National team
2012–	Bulgaria
Honours
Men's volleyball
Representing Bulgaria
European Championship
Bronze medal – third place	2009 Turkey
- Last updated: 30 January 2017

Teodor Todorov (Bulgarian: Теодор Тодоров; born 1 September 1989) is a Bulgarian volleyball player, a member of the Bulgaria men's national volleyball team and Bulgarian club CSKA Sofia, a participant at the Olympic Games London 2012, bronze medalist at the European Championship 2009 and double Bulgarian Champion (2010, 2011).

== Sporting achievements ==
=== Clubs ===
==== National championships ====
- 2008/2009 Bulgarian Cup, with CSKA Sofia
- 2008/2009 Bulgarian Championship, with CSKA Sofia
- 2009/2010 Bulgarian Cup, with CSKA Sofia
- 2009/2010 Bulgarian Championship, with CSKA Sofia
- 2010/2011 Bulgarian Cup, with CSKA Sofia
- 2010/2011 Bulgarian Championship, with CSKA Sofia

=== National team ===
- 2009 CEV European Championship

=== Individual ===
- 2015 CEV European Championship - Best Middle Blocker
- 2016 Memorial of Hubert Jerzy Wagner - Best Middle Blocker

Awards
Preceded by First Award	Best Middle Blocker of CEV European Championship; 2015 ex aequo (Bulgaria) Viktor Yosifov	Succeeded by (Serbia) Srećko Lisinac (Germany) Marcus Böhme
