= 2010 Memorial of Hubert Jerzy Wagner =

Tournament details
- Host country: Poland
- Dates: 20 – 22 August
- Teams: 4
- Venue: 1 (in 1 host city)

Final positions
- Champions: Brazil (1st title)
- Runners-up: Bulgaria
- Third place: Poland
- Fourth place: Czech Republic

Tournament awards
- MVP: (Brazil) Murilo Endres

The VIII Memorial of Hubert Jerzy Wagner was held in Poland from 20 to 22 August 2010. Four teams participated in the tournament.

== Qualification ==
All teams except the host must receive an invitation from the organizers.

| Africa (CAVB) | Asia and Oceania (AVC) | Europe (CEV) | North, Central America and Caribbean (NORCECA) | South America (CSV) |
| | | Host nation: Poland; Wild card: Czech Republic; Bulgaria | | Wild card: Brazil |

== Venue ==
Bydgoszcz, Poland
Łuczniczka
Capacity: 8,000
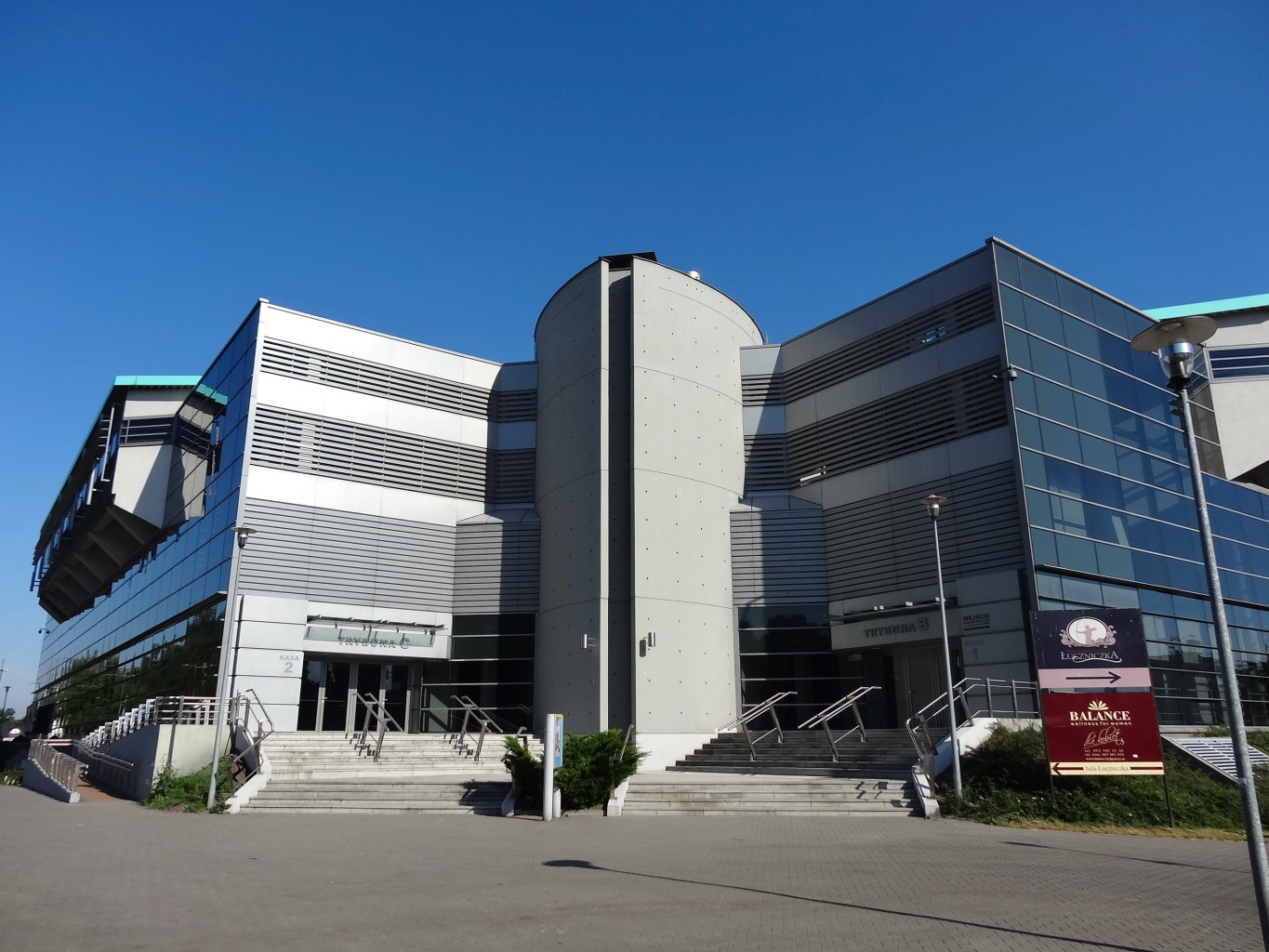

== Results ==
- All times are Central European Summer Time (UTC+02:00).

| Pos | Team | Pld | W | L | Pts | SPW | SPL | SPR | SW | SL | SR |
|---|---|---|---|---|---|---|---|---|---|---|---|
| 1 | Brazil | 3 | 3 | 0 | 9 | 268 | 225 | 1.191 | 9 | 2 | 4.500 |
| 2 | Bulgaria | 3 | 2 | 1 | 6 | 245 | 252 | 0.972 | 6 | 5 | 1.200 |
| 3 | Poland | 3 | 1 | 2 | 3 | 274 | 281 | 0.975 | 5 | 7 | 0.714 |
| 4 | Czech Republic | 3 | 0 | 3 | 0 | 262 | 291 | 0.900 | 3 | 9 | 0.333 |

Source: Flashscore

| Date | Time | | Score | | Set 1 | Set 2 | Set 3 | Set 4 | Set 5 | Total | Report |
|---|---|---|---|---|---|---|---|---|---|---|---|
| 20 Aug | 17:30 | Brazil | 3–1 | Czech Republic | 25–18 | 25–20 | 20–25 | 25–22 | | 95–85 | Report |
| 20 Aug | 20:15 | Poland | 1–3 | Bulgaria | 23–25 | 23–25 | 25–15 | 22–25 | | 93–90 | Report |
| 21 Aug | 14:45 | Poland | 3–1 | Czech Republic | 23–25 | 25–22 | 25–23 | 25–23 | | 98–93 | Report |
| 21 Aug | 16:45 | Bulgaria | 0–3 | Brazil | 22–25 | 19–25 | 16–25 | | | 57–75 | Report |
| 22 Aug | 12:30 | Czech Republic | 1–3 | Bulgaria | 25–23 | 21–25 | 19–25 | 19–25 | | 84–98 | Report |
| 22 Aug | 14:45 | Poland | 1–3 | Brazil | 22–25 | 22–25 | 25–23 | 14–25 | | 83–98 | Report |

== Final standing ==
| Rank | Team |
|---|---|
| 1st place, gold medalist(s) | Brazil |
| 2nd place, silver medalist(s) | Bulgaria |
| 3rd place, bronze medalist(s) | Poland |
| 4 | Czech Republic |

2010 Memorial of Hubert Jerzy Wagner

Brazil
1st title

Rezende, Marlon, Lopes, Vissotto, Tavares, Dante, Giba, Alves, Murilo, Saatkamp, Eder, Rodrigão, Sidão, Mario, Barbosa
Head coach
Rezende

== Awards ==
- MVP: (Brazil) Murilo Endres
- Best spiker: (Bulgaria) Matey Kaziyski
- Best blocker: (Poland) Piotr Nowakowski
- Best server: (Czech Republic) Lukáš Ticháček
- Best setter: (Brazil) Marlon Muraguti
- Best receiver (Brazil) Dante Amaral
- Best libero: (Bulgaria) Teodor Salparov
