= 2015 Memorial of Hubert Jerzy Wagner =

Memorial Service Of Hubert Jerzy Wagner

Tournament details
- Host country: Poland
- Dates: 22 – 24 August
- Teams: 4
- Venue: 1 (in 1 host city)

Final positions
- Champions: Poland (6th title)
- Runners-up: Japan
- Third place: France
- Fourth place: Iran

Tournament awards
- MVP: (Poland) Michał Kubiak

The XIII Memorial of Hubert Jerzy Wagner was held at Hala Sportowo-Widowiskowa in Toruń, Poland from 22 to 24 August 2015. Like the previous edition, 4 teams participated in the tournament.

== Qualification ==
All teams except the host must have received an invitation from the organizers.

Africa (CAVB)	Asia and Oceania (AVC)	Europe (CEV)	North, Central America and Caribbean (NORCECA)	South America (CSV)
	Wild card: Japan; Iran	Host nation: Poland; Wild card: France		

== Venue ==
Toruń, Poland
Hala Sportowo-Widowiskowa
Capacity: 9,250
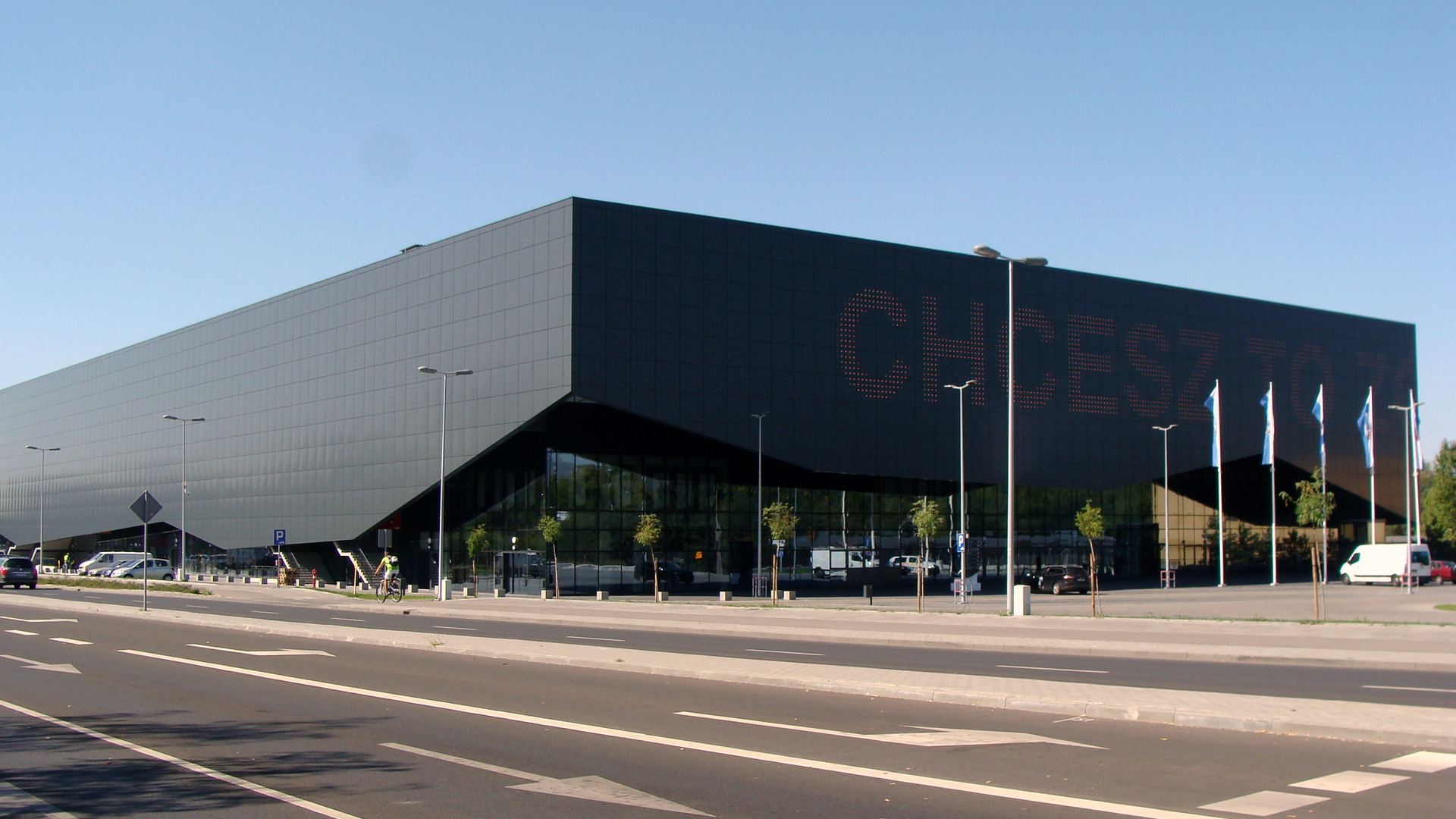

== Results ==
- All times are Central European Summer Time (UTC+02:00).

Pos	Team	Pld	W	L	Pts	SPW	SPL	SPR	SW	SL	SR
1	Poland	3	3	0	8	281	254	1.106	9	3	3.000
2	Japan	3	2	1	6	237	247	0.960	6	4	1.500
3	France	3	1	2	4	273	273	1.000	6	6	1.000
4	Iran	3	0	3	0	223	251	0.888	1	9	0.111

Source: Flashscore

Date	Time		Score		Set 1	Set 2	Set 3	Set 4	Set 5	Total	Report
22 Aug	18:00	Iran	0–3	France	22–25	23–25	23–25			68–75	Report
22 Aug	20:30	Poland	3–0	Japan	28–26	25–15	25–18			78–59	Report
23 Aug	17:00	Japan	3–1	France	20–25	25–21	25–21	25–19		95–86	Report
23 Aug	19:30	Poland	3–1	Iran	25–23	18–25	25–15	25–20		93–83	Report
24 Aug	18:00	Japan	3–0	Iran	33–31	25–21	25–20			83–72	Report
24 Aug	20:30	Poland	3–2	France	25–27	19–25	26–24	25–23	15–13	110–112	Report

== Final standing ==
Rank	Team
1st place, gold medalist(s)	Poland
2nd place, silver medalist(s)	Japan
3rd place, bronze medalist(s)	France
4	Iran

2015 Memorial of Hubert Jerzy Wagner

Poland
6th title

Nowakowski, Konarski, Kurek, Kłos, Drzyzga, Łomacz, Kubiak (C), Gacek, Zatorski, Możdżonek, Buszek, Bieniek, Szalpuk, Włodarczyk
Head coach
Antiga

== Awards ==
- Most valuable player
  (Poland) Michał Kubiak
- Best setter:
  (France) Yoann Jaumel
- Best server:
  (Poland) Mateusz Bieniek
- Best receiver:
  (Japan) Yūki Ishikawa
- Best blocker:
  (Poland) Piotr Nowakowski
- Best spiker:
  (Poland) Dawid Konarski
- Best libero:
  (Poland) Paweł Zatorski
