= 2008 Memorial of Hubert Jerzy Wagner =

Tournament details
- Host country: Poland
- Dates: 16 – 18 May
- Teams: 4
- Venue: 1 (in 1 host city)

Final positions
- Champions: Poland (2nd title)
- Runners-up: Estonia
- Third place: Montenegro
- Fourth place: Hungary

Tournament awards
- MVP: (Poland) Mariusz Wlazły

The VI Memorial of Hubert Jerzy Wagner was held in Poland from 16 to 18 May 2008. Four teams participated in the tournament. It was also qualification tournament to European Championship 2009 held in Turkey.

== Qualification ==
All teams except the host must receive an invitation from the organizers.

Africa (CAVB)	Asia and Oceania (AVC)	Europe (CEV)	North, Central America and Caribbean (NORCECA)	South America (CSV)
		Host nation: Poland; Wild card: Estonia; Hungary; Montenegro		

== Venue ==
Olsztyn, Poland
Urania Hall
Capacity: 2,500
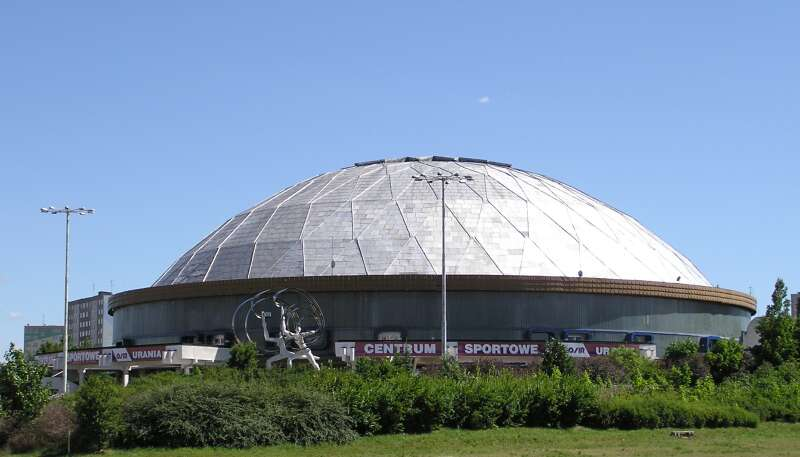

== Results ==
- All times are Central European Summer Time (UTC+02:00).

Pos	Team	Pld	W	L	Pts	SPW	SPL	SPR	SW	SL	SR
1	Poland	3	3	0	9	225	172	1.308	9	0	MAX
2	Estonia	3	2	1	6	254	246	1.033	6	5	1.200
3	Montenegro	3	1	2	3	248	263	0.943	4	7	0.571
4	Hungary	3	0	3	0	237	281	0.843	2	9	0.222

Date	Time		Score		Set 1	Set 2	Set 3	Set 4	Set 5	Total	Report
16 May		Poland	3–0	Montenegro	25–19	25–18	25–20			75–57	
16 May		Estonia	3–1	Hungary	27–25	25–27	25–13	25–21		102–86	
17 May		Poland	3–0	Estonia	28–26	25–17	25–19			78–62	
17 May		Montenegro	3–1	Hungary	25–21	25–23	28–30	27–25		105–99	
18 May		Estonia	3–1	Montenegro	25–20	25–20	16–25	25–21		91–86	
18 May		Poland	3–0	Hungary	25–17	25–19	25–18			75–54	

== Final standing ==
Rank	Team
1st place, gold medalist(s)	Poland
2nd place, silver medalist(s)	Estonia
3rd place, bronze medalist(s)	Montenegro
4	Hungary

2008 Memorial of Hubert Jerzy Wagner

Poland
2nd title

Woicki, Żygadło, Wlazły, Gruszka, Świderski, Wika, Gierczyński, Nowakowski, Pliński, Możdżonek, Bąkiewicz, Ignaczak
Head coach
Lozano

== Awards ==
- MVP: (Poland) Mariusz Wlazły
- Best spiker: (Poland) Mariusz Wlazły
- Best scorer: (Montenegro) Miloš Ćulafić
- Best blocker: (Poland) Daniel Pliński
- Best server: (Poland) Mariusz Wlazły
- Best setter: (Poland) Paweł Woicki
- Best receiver (Poland) Marcin Wika
- Best libero: (Estonia) Sten Esna
