= 2014 Memorial of Hubert Jerzy Wagner =

Tournament details
- Host country: Poland
- Dates: 16 – 18 August
- Teams: 4
- Venue: 1 (in 1 host city)

Final positions
- Champions: Russia (2nd title)
- Runners-up: Poland
- Third place: Bulgaria
- Fourth place: China

Tournament awards
- MVP: (Russia) Dmitriy Muserskiy

The XII Memorial of Hubert Jerzy Wagner was held at Kraków Arena in Kraków, Poland from 16 to 18 August 2014. As in the previous edition, four teams participated in the tournament.

== Qualification ==
All teams except the host must receive an invitation from the organizers.

Africa (CAVB)	Asia and Oceania (AVC)	Europe (CEV)	North, Central America and Caribbean (NORCECA)	South America (CSV)
	Wild card: China	Host nation: Poland; Wild card: Russia; Bulgaria		

== Venue ==
Kraków, Poland
Tauron Arena
Capacity: 15,328
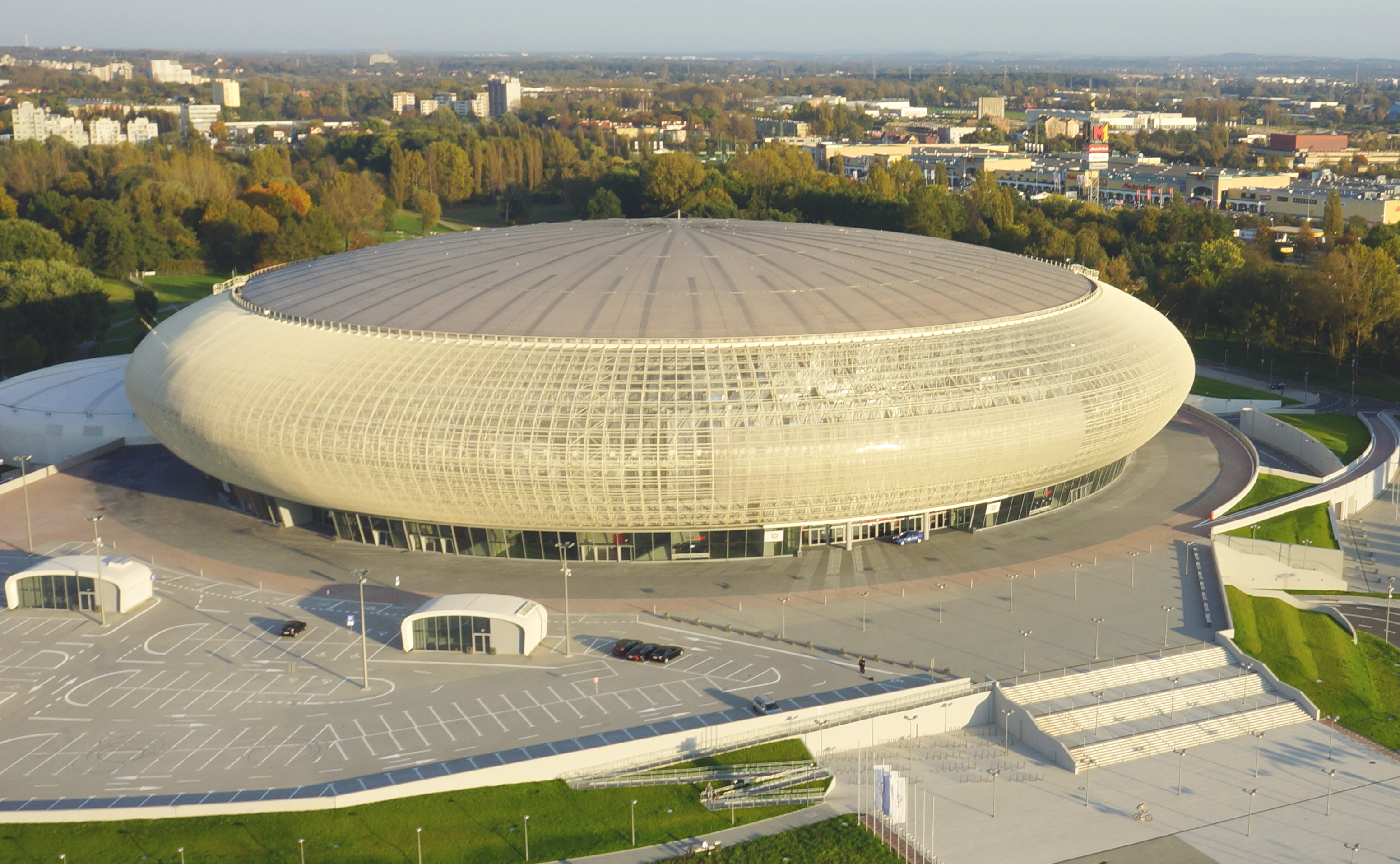

== Results ==
- All times are Central European Summer Time (UTC+02:00).

Pos	Team	Pld	W	L	Pts	SPW	SPL	SPR	SW	SL	SR
1	Russia	3	2	1	7	280	258	1.085	8	4	2.000
2	Poland	3	2	1	6	298	277	1.076	8	5	1.600
3	Bulgaria	3	2	1	4	312	318	0.981	7	7	1.000
4	China	3	0	3	1	226	263	0.859	2	9	0.222

Source: Flashscore

Date	Time		Score		Set 1	Set 2	Set 3	Set 4	Set 5	Total	Report
16 Sep	17:30	China	0–3	Russia	24–26	21–25	17–25			62–76	
16 Sep	20:30	Poland	2–3	Bulgaria	25–20	23–25	27–29	26–24	13–15	114–113	
17 Sep	17:30	Bulgaria	1–3	Russia	23–25	25–22	20–25	19–25		87–97	
17 Sep	20:30	Poland	3–0	China	25–18	25–22	25–17			75–57	
18 Sep	17:30	China	2–3	Bulgaria	22–25	25–22	25–20	17–25	18–20	107–112	
18 Sep	20:30	Poland	3–2	Russia	22–25	26–24	20–25	26–24	15–9	109–107	

== Final standing ==
Rank	Team
1st place, gold medalist(s)	Russia
2nd place, silver medalist(s)	Poland
3rd place, bronze medalist(s)	Bulgaria
4	China

2014 Memorial of Hubert Jerzy Wagner

Russia
2nd title

12–man roster
Grankin, Pavlov, Spiridonov, Savin, Muserskiy, Apalikov, Golubev, Moroz, Makarov, Ilinikh, Ziemczonok, Biryukov
Head coach
Voronkov

== Awards ==
- Most valuable player
  (Russia) Dmitriy Muserskiy
- Best spiker:
  (Bulgaria) Tsvetan Sokolov
- Best blocker:
  (Russia) Nikolay Apalikov
- Best server:
  (Poland) Piotr Nowakowski
- Best setter:
  (Russia) Sergey Grankin
- Best libero:
  (Poland) Krzysztof Ignaczak
- Best receiver:
  (Russia) Aleksey Spiridonov
