= 2018 Memorial of Hubert Jerzy Wagner =

Tournament details
- Host country: Poland
- Dates: 24 – 26 August
- Teams: 4
- Venue: 1 (in 1 host city)

Final positions
- Champions: Poland (8th title)
- Runners-up: Russia
- Third place: France
- Fourth place: Canada

Tournament awards
- MVP: (Poland) Artur Szalpuk

The XVI Memorial of Hubert Jerzy Wagner was a volleyball tournament held at Tauron Arena in Kraków, Poland from 24 to 26 August 2018. As in the previous edition, four teams participated in the tournament, but for the first time, the same teams participated for the second time in a row.

== Qualification ==
All teams except the host must have received an invitation from the organizers.

Africa (CAVB)	Asia and Oceania (AVC)	Europe (CEV)	North, Central America and Caribbean (NORCECA)	South America (CSV)
		Host nation: Poland; Wild card: France; Russia	Wild card: Canada	

== Venue ==
Kraków, Poland
Tauron Arena
Capacity: 15,328
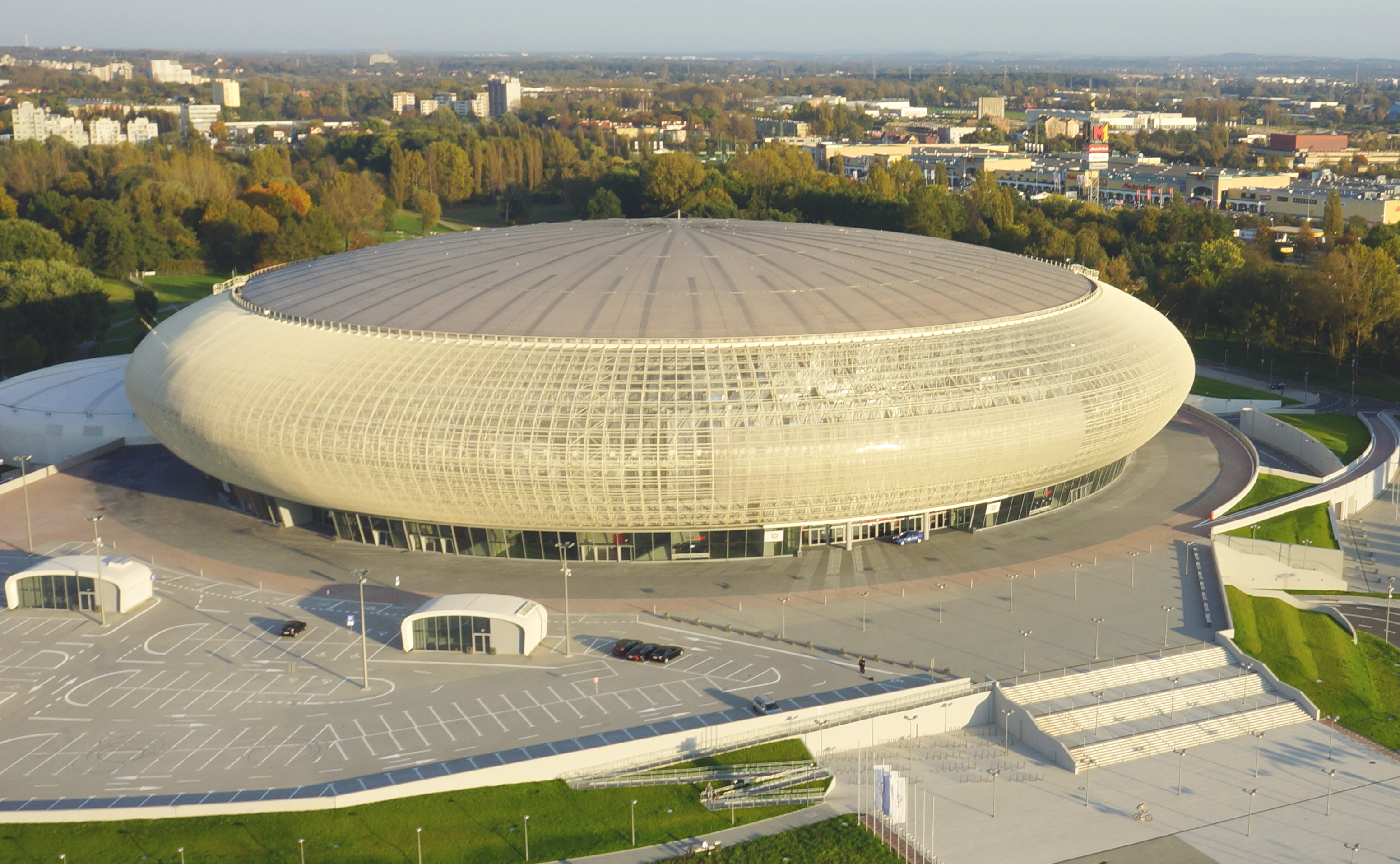

== Results ==
- All times are Central European Summer Time (UTC+02:00).

Pos	Team	Pld	W	L	Pts	SW	SL	SR	SPW	SPL	SPR	Qualification
1	Poland	3	3	0	7	9	4	2.250	302	274	1.102	Champions
2	Russia	3	2	1	6	8	6	1.333	312	303	1.030	
3	France	3	1	2	4	6	7	0.857	290	297	0.976	
4	Canada	3	0	3	1	3	9	0.333	256	286	0.895	

Source: Flashscore

Date	Time		Score		Set 1	Set 2	Set 3	Set 4	Set 5	Total	Report
24 Aug	18:30	Poland	3–0	Canada	29–27	25–17	25–19			79–63	
24 Aug	21:30	France	1–3	Russia	16–25	25–23	20–25	24–26		85–99	
25 Aug	15:00	Poland	3–2	France	30–28	21–25	22–25	25–21	15–13	113–112	
25 Aug	18:00	Russia	3–2	Canada	25–17	25–22	22–25	21–25	21–19	114–108	
26 Aug	14:00	France	3–1	Canada	18–25	25–22	25–22	25–16		93–85	
26 Aug	17:30	Poland	3–2	Russia	21–25	25–22	24–26	25–15	15–10	110–98	

== Final standing ==
Rank	Team
1st place, gold medalist(s)	Poland
2nd place, silver medalist(s)	Russia
3rd place, bronze medalist(s)	France
4	Canada

2018 Memorial of Hubert Jerzy Wagner winners

Poland
8th title

Piotr Nowakowski, Dawid Konarski, Bartosz Kurek, Artur Szalpuk, Damian Schulz, Damian Wojtaszek, Fabian Drzyzga, Grzegorz Łomacz, Michał Kubiak (C), Aleksander Śliwka, Jakub Kochanowski, Paweł Zatorski, Bartosz Kwolek, Mateusz Bieniek
Head coach
Vital Heynen

== Awards ==
- Most valuable player
  (Poland) Artur Szalpuk
- Best setter
  (Canada) Jay Blankenau
- Best server
  (Poland) Piotr Nowakowski
- Best receiver
  (Russia) Dmitry Volkov
- Best blocker
  (Poland) Jakub Kochanowski
- Best opposite spiker
  (France) Jean Patry
- Best libero
  (France) Jenia Grebennikov
