= 2024 Memorial of Hubert Jerzy Wagner =

Volleyball tournament

Tournament details
- Host country: Poland
- Dates: 12–14 July 2024
- Teams: 4
- Venue: 1 (in 1 host city)

Final positions
- Champions: Poland (11th title)
- Runners-up: Slovenia
- Third place: Germany
- Fourth place: Egypt

Tournament awards
- MVP: (Poland) Kamil Semeniuk
- Best Setter: (Slovenia) Gregor Ropret
- Best OH: (Poland) Tomasz Fornal
- Best MB: (Poland) Jakub Kochanowski
- Best OPP: (Slovenia) Tonček Štern
- Best Libero: (Germany) Julian Zenger

The XXI Memorial of Hubert Jerzy Wagner was a volleyball tournament held at Tauron Arena in Kraków, Poland from 12 to 14 July 2024.

The 2024 edition of the tournament was held only two weeks before the 2024 Summer Olympics.

== Participating teams ==
Team	Appearance			Best performance
Team	Last	Total	Streak	Best performance
Poland	2023	21	20	10× Champions (2006, 2008, 2009, 2012, 2013, 2015, 2017, 2018, 2021, 2022)
Germany	2013	5	2	1× Champions (2007)
Slovenia	2023	2	1	1× Runner-up (2023)
Egypt	2021	3	1	1× Runner-up (2021)

== Qualification ==
All teams except the host must have received an invitation from the organizers.

Africa (CAVB)	Asia and Oceania (AVC)	Europe (CEV)	North, Central America and Caribbean (NORCECA)	South America (CSV)
Wild card: Egypt		Host nation: Poland; Wild card: Germany; Slovenia		

== Venue ==
Kraków, Poland
Tauron Arena
Capacity: 15,328
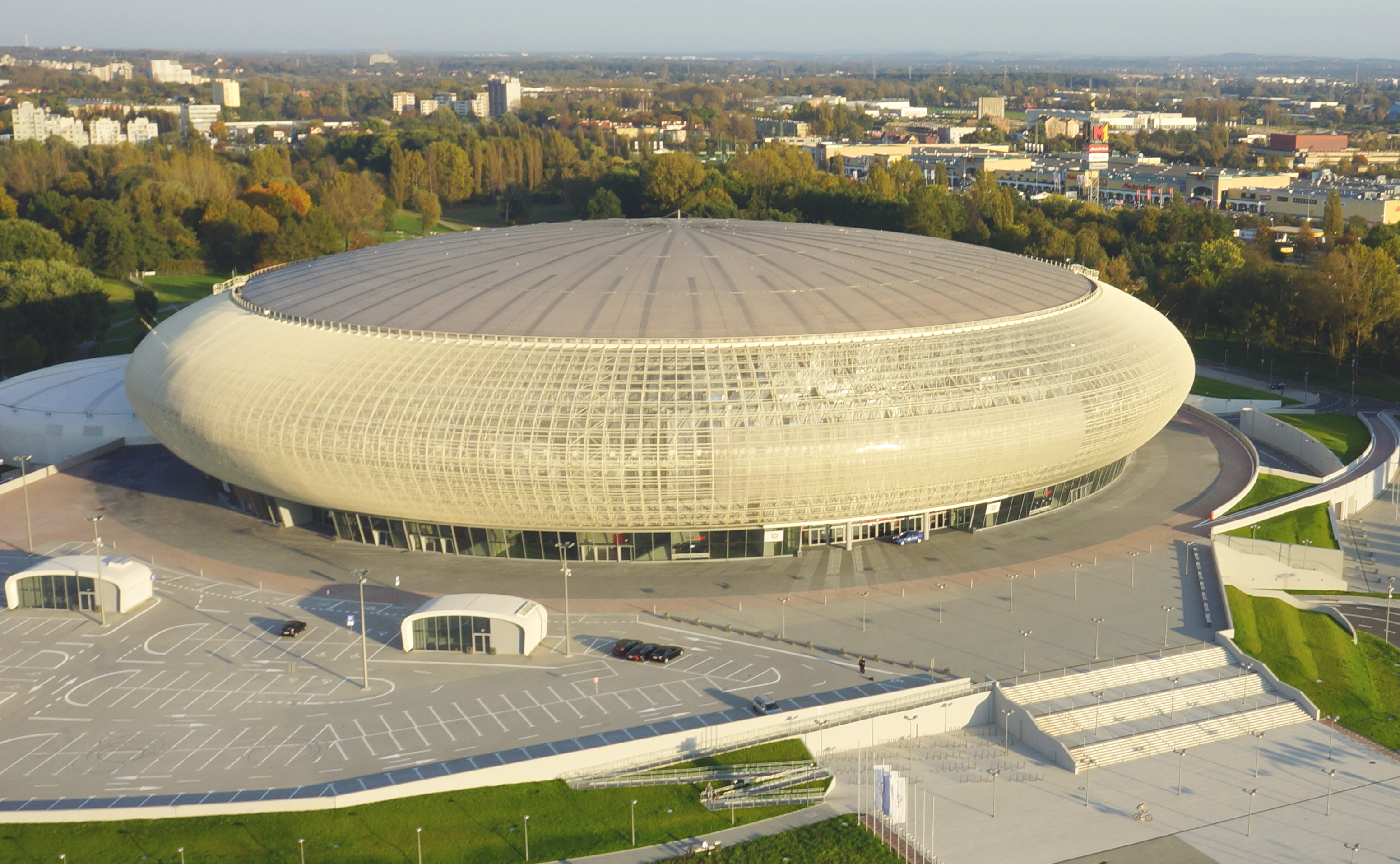

== Pool standing procedure ==
1. Number of matches won
2. Match points
3. Sets ratio
4. Points ratio
5. If the tie continues as per the point ratio between two teams, the priority will be given to the team which won the match between them. When the tie in points ratio is between three or more teams, a new classification of these teams in the terms of points 1, 2, 3 and 4 will be made taking into consideration only the matches in which they were opposed to each other.

Match won 3–0 or 3–1: 3 match points for the winner, 0 match points for the loser
Match won 3–2: 2 match points for the winner, 1 match point for the loser

== Results ==
All times are local Central European Summer Time (UTC+2).

=== Ranking ===
Pos	Team	Pld	W	L	Pts	SW	SL	SR	SPW	SPL	SPR
1	Poland	3	3	0	8	9	3	3.000	284	243	1.169
2	Slovenia	3	2	1	5	7	6	1.167	284	288	0.986
3	Germany	3	1	2	5	7	7	1.000	300	295	1.017
4	Egypt	3	0	3	0	2	9	0.222	218	260	0.838

Source: Flashscore

Date	Time		Score		Set 1	Set 2	Set 3	Set 4	Set 5	Total	Report
12 July	16:00	Poland	3–0	Egypt	25–16	25–21	25–18			75–55	Report
12 July	18:30	Germany	2–3	Slovenia	22–25	20–25	25–21	25–20	13–15	105–106	Report
13 July	18:30	Poland	3–2	Germany	20–25	22–25	25–19	25–21	15–12	107–102	Report
13 July	20:30	Slovenia	3–1	Egypt	25–21	25–19	17–25	25–16		92–81	Report
14 July	14:30	Germany	3–1	Egypt	25–14	26–24	17–25	25–19		93–82	Report
14 July	18:30	Poland	3–1	Slovenia	25–20	26–28	25–14	26–24		102–86	Report

== Final standing ==
Rank	Team
1st place, gold medalist(s)	Poland
2nd place, silver medalist(s)	Slovenia
3rd place, bronze medalist(s)	Germany
4	Egypt

2024 Memorial of Hubert Jerzy Wagner winners

Poland
11th title

Jakub Popiwczak, Marcin Komenda, Łukasz Kaczmarek, Bartosz Kurek, Karol Kłos, Wilfredo Leon, Bartosz Bednorz, Aleksander Śliwka, Grzegorz Łomacz, Jakub Kochanowski, Kamil Semeniuk, Paweł Zatorski, Marcin Janusz, Mateusz Bieniek, Tomasz Fornal, Bartłomiej Bołądź, Norbert Huber
Head coach
Nikola Grbić

== Awards ==
- Most valuable player
  (Poland) Kamil Semeniuk
- Best setter
  (Slovenia) Gregor Ropret
- Best receiver
  (Poland) Tomasz Fornal
- Best blocker
  (Poland) Jakub Kochanowski
- Best spiker
  (Slovenia) Tonček Štern
- Best libero
  (Germany) Julian Zenger
