= 2011 Memorial of Hubert Jerzy Wagner =

Tournament details
- Host country: Poland
- Dates: 26 – 28 August
- Teams: 4
- Venue: 1 (in 1 host city)

Final positions
- Champions: Italy (1st title)
- Runners-up: Russia
- Third place: Czech Republic
- Fourth place: Poland

Tournament awards
- MVP: (Italy) Cristian Savani

The IX Memorial of Hubert Jerzy Wagner was held in Poland from 26 to 28 August 2011. Four teams participated in the tournament.

== Qualification ==
All teams except the host must receive an invitation from the organizers.

Africa (CAVB)	Asia and Oceania (AVC)	Europe (CEV)	North, Central America and Caribbean (NORCECA)	South America (CSV)
		Host nation: Poland; Wild card: Czech Republic; Italy; Russia		

== Venue ==
Katowice, Poland
Spodek
Capacity: 11,500
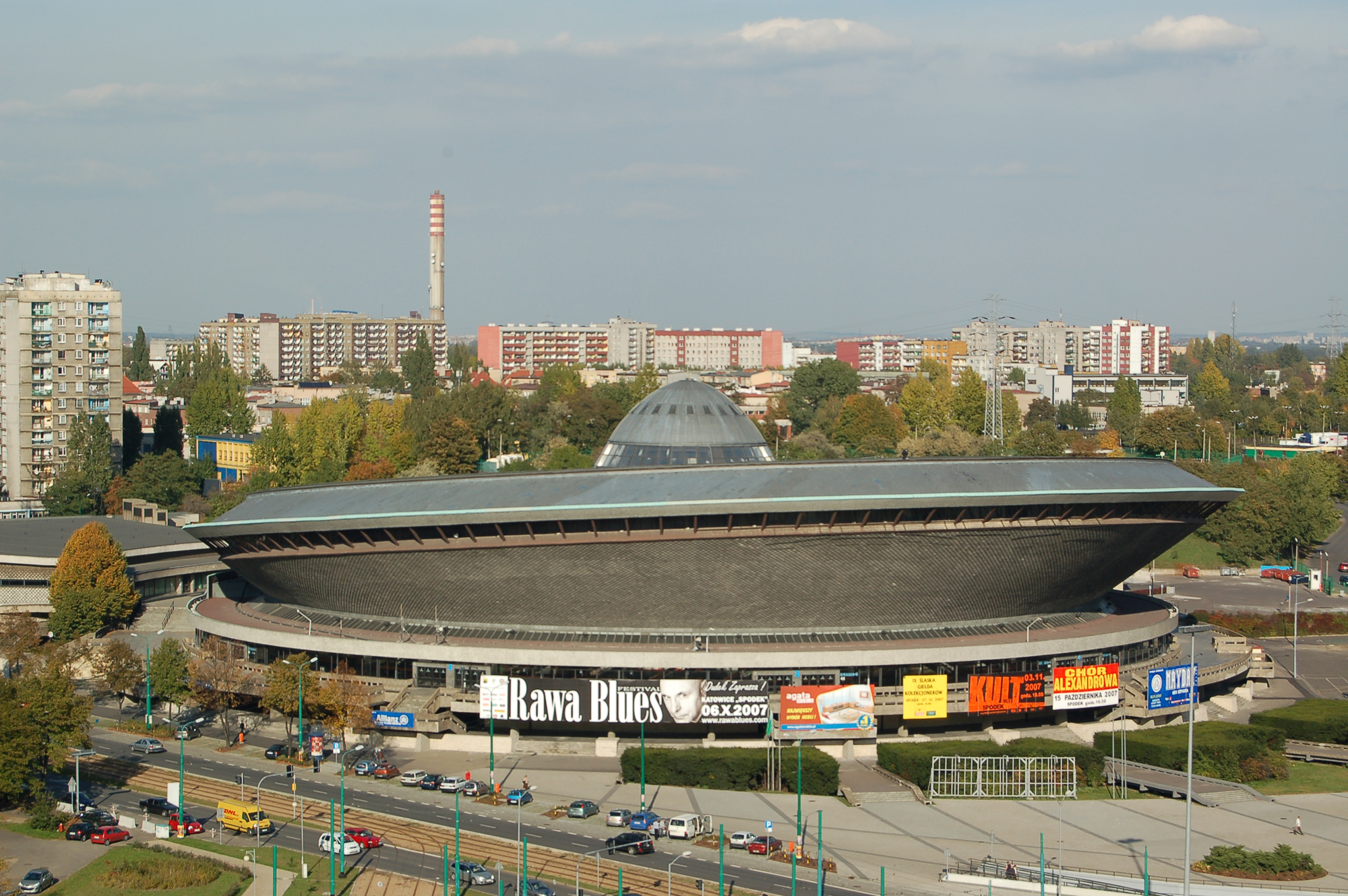

== Results ==
- All times are Central European Summer Time (UTC+02:00).

Pos	Team	Pld	W	L	Pts	SPW	SPL	SPR	SW	SL	SR
1	Italy	3	3	0	8	324	315	1.029	9	4	2.250
2	Russia	3	2	1	7	274	229	1.197	8	3	2.667
3	Czech Republic	3	1	2	3	233	252	0.925	4	6	0.667
4	Poland	3	0	3	0	205	240	0.854	1	9	0.111

Source: Flashscore

Date	Time		Score		Set 1	Set 2	Set 3	Set 4	Set 5	Total	Report
26 Aug	18:00	Russia	2–3	Italy	30–32	25–19	32–30	22–25	15–17	124–123	Report
26 Aug	20:00	Poland	0–3	Czech Republic	21–25	18–25	25–27			64–77	Report
27 Aug	14:00	Czech Republic	0–3	Russia	17–25	18–25	14–25			49–75	Report
27 Aug	16:30	Poland	1–3	Italy	15–25	25–13	23–25	21–25		84–88	Report
28 Aug	14:00	Czech Republic	1–3	Italy	25–27	36–38	25–23	21–25		107–113	Report
28 Aug	16:30	Poland	0–3	Russia	22–25	16–25	19–25			57–75	Report

== Final standing ==
Rank	Team
1st place, gold medalist(s)	Italy
2nd place, silver medalist(s)	Russia
3rd place, bronze medalist(s)	Czech Republic
4	Poland

2011 Memorial of Hubert Jerzy Wagner

Italy
1st title

Mastrangelo, Kovář, Parodi, Bari, De Togni, Barone, Łasko, Maruotti, Zaytsev, Boninfante, Savani, Buti, Travica, Giovi, Birarelli, Della Lunga, Sabbi, De Pandis
Head coach
Berruto

== Awards ==
- MVP: (Italy) Cristian Savani
- Best scorer: (Russia) Maxim Mikhaylov
- Best spiker: (Russia) Denis Biriukov
- Best blocker: (Italy) Luigi Mastrangelo
- Best server: (Russia) Aleksandr Volkov
- Best setter: (Czech Republic) Lukáš Ticháček
- Best libero: (Italy) Andrea Giovi
