= 2016 Memorial of Hubert Jerzy Wagner =

Tournament details
- Host country: Poland
- Dates: 17 – 19 May
- Teams: 4
- Venue: 1 (in 1 host city)

Final positions
- Champions: Bulgaria (1st title)
- Runners-up: Serbia
- Third place: Poland
- Fourth place: Belgium

Tournament awards
- MVP: (Bulgaria) Tsvetan Sokolov
- Best Setter: (Bulgaria) Georgi Seganov
- Best OH: (Poland) Michał Kubiak (Serbia) Uroš Kovačević
- Best MB: (Serbia) Srećko Lisinac (Bulgaria) Teodor Todorov
- Best OPP: (Poland) Bartosz Kurek
- Best Libero: (Bulgaria) Vladislav Ivanov

The XIV Memorial of Hubert Jerzy Wagner was held at Tauron Arena Kraków in Kraków, Poland from 17 to 19 May 2016. As in the previous edition, four teams participated in the tournament.

== Qualification ==
All teams except the host must have received an invitation from the organizers.

Africa (CAVB)	Asia and Oceania (AVC)	Europe (CEV)	North, Central America and Caribbean (NORCECA)	South America (CSV)
		Host nation: Poland; Wild card: Belgium; Bulgaria; Serbia		

== Venue ==
Kraków, Poland
Tauron Arena
Capacity: 15,328
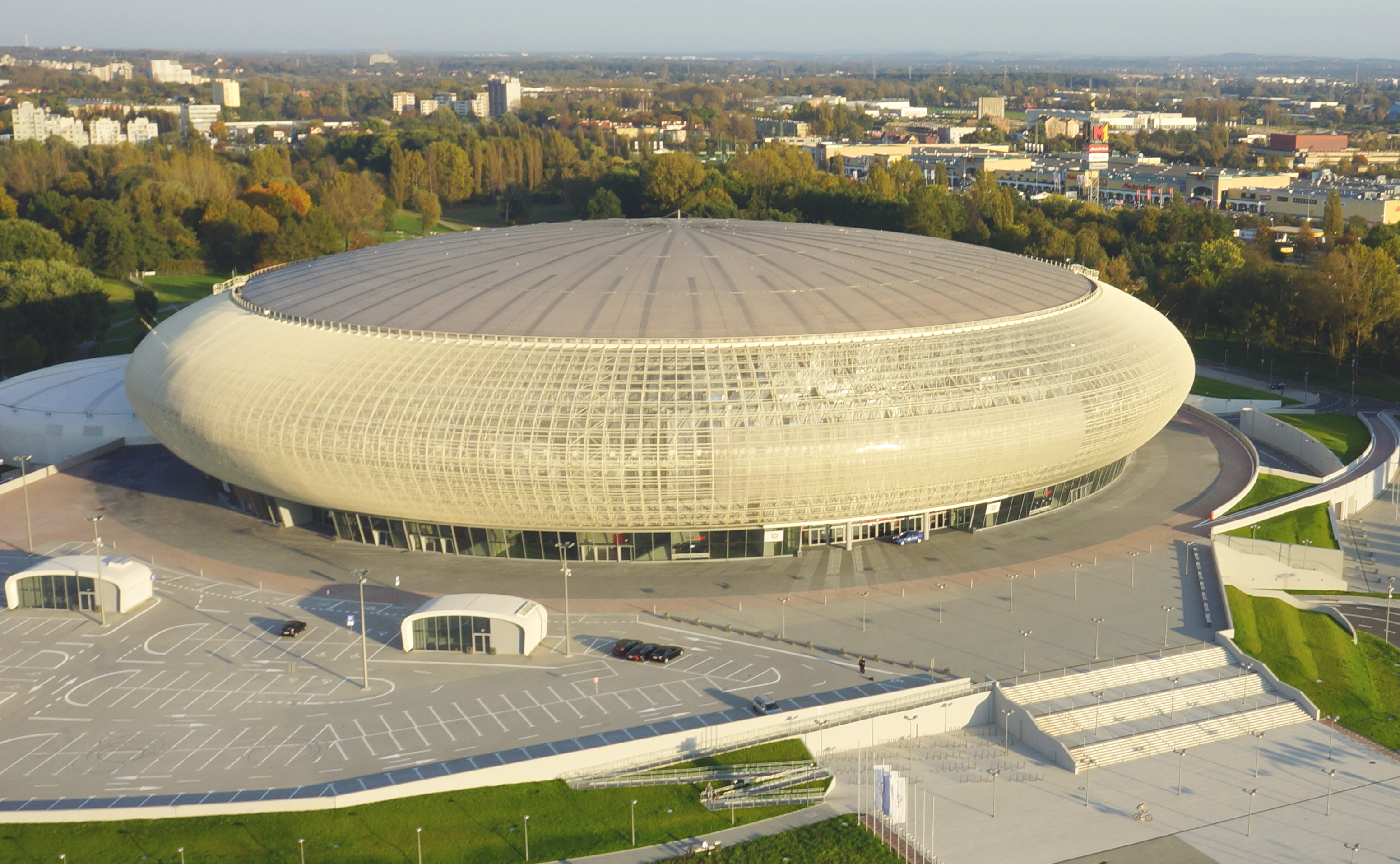

== Results ==
- All times are Central European Summer Time (UTC+02:00).

Pos	Team	Pld	W	L	Pts	SW	SL	SR	SPW	SPL	SPR
1	Bulgaria	3	3	0	7	9	4	2.250	289	258	1.120
2	Serbia	3	2	1	5	8	7	1.143	306	307	0.997
3	Poland	3	1	2	5	7	7	1.000	298	297	1.003
4	Belgium	3	0	3	1	3	9	0.333	243	274	0.887

Source: Flashscore

Date	Time		Score		Set 1	Set 2	Set 3	Set 4	Set 5	Total	Report
17 May	17:30	Belgium	2–3	Serbia	22–25	25–16	21–25	25–23	12–15	105–104	
17 May	20:30	Poland	2–3	Bulgaria	21–25	25–21	21–25	26–24	12–15	105–110	
18 May	17:30	Bulgaria	3–2	Serbia	25–20	16–25	25–14	22–25	16–14	104–98	
18 May	20:30	Poland	3–1	Belgium	20–25	25–16	25–20	25–22		95–83	
19 May	17:30	Belgium	0–3	Bulgaria	10–25	22–25	23–25			55–75	
19 May	20:30	Poland	2–3	Serbia	25–17	25–22	18–25	19–25	11–15	98–104	

== Final standing ==
Rank	Team
1st place, gold medalist(s)	Bulgaria
2nd place, silver medalist(s)	Serbia
3rd place, bronze medalist(s)	Poland
4	Belgium

2016 Memorial of Hubert Jerzy Wagner

Bulgaria

Lapkov, Ananiev, Manchev, Gotsev, Skrimov, Seganov, B. Grozdanov, Yosifov, Karakashev, Todorov, Ivanov, Penchev, Sokolov, A. Grozdanov
Head coach
Konstantinov

== Awards ==
- Most valuable player
  (Bulgaria) Tsvetan Sokolov
- Best setter
  (Bulgaria) Georgi Seganov
- Best outside spikers
  (Poland) Michał Kubiak
  (Serbia) Uroš Kovačević
- Best middle blockers
  (Serbia) Srećko Lisinac
  (Bulgaria) Teodor Todorov
- Best opposite spiker
  (Poland) Bartosz Kurek
- Best libero
  (Bulgaria) Vladislav Ivanov
