= Vladislav Ivanov (volleyball) =

Bulgarian volleyball player (born 1987)

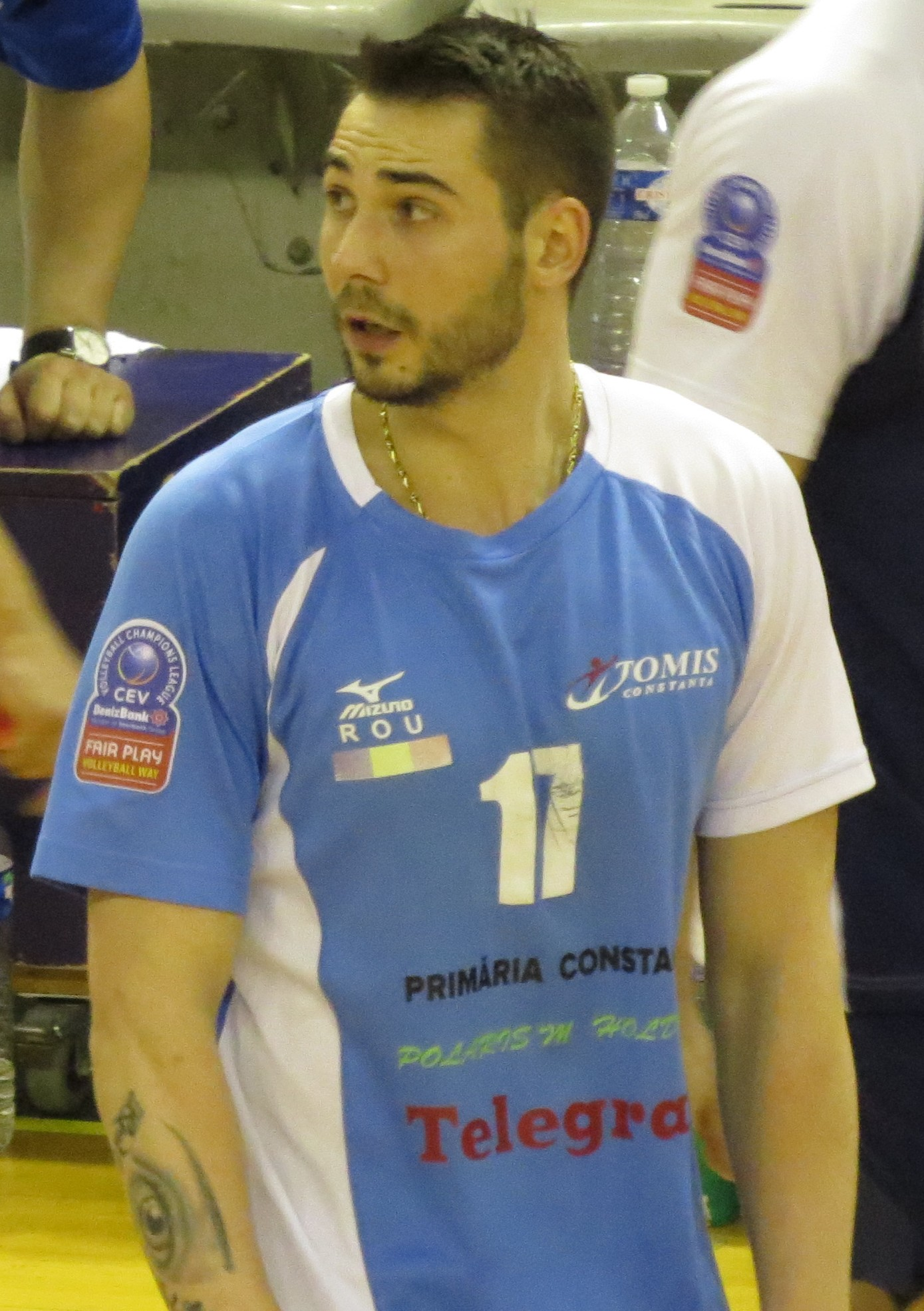

Personal information
- Nationality: Bulgarian
- Born: 14 March 1987 (age 39) Sofia, Bulgaria
- Height: 1.88 m (6 ft 2 in)
- Weight: 80 kg (176 lb)
- Spike: 320 cm (126 in)
- Block: 310 cm (122 in)

Volleyball information
- Position: Libero
- Current club: Levski Volley
- Number: 16

Career
- Years: Team
- 2005–2011 2011–2014 2014–2017 2017–: Levski Volley; C.V.M. Tomis Constanța; ASUL Lyon; Levski Volley

National team
- Years: Team
- 2010–: Bulgaria

Vladislav Ivanov (Bulgarian: Владислав Иванов; born 14 March 1987) is a Bulgarian male volleyball player. He was part of the Bulgaria men's national volleyball team at the 2010 FIVB Volleyball Men's World Championship in Italy. He plays for Levski Volley.

== Sporting achievements ==
=== Individual ===
- 2016 Memorial of Hubert Jerzy Wagner - Best Libero
