= 2012 Memorial of Hubert Jerzy Wagner =

Tournament details
- Host country: Poland
- Dates: 20 – 22 July
- Teams: 4
- Venue: 1 (in 1 host city)

Final positions
- Champions: Poland (4th title)
- Runners-up: Germany
- Third place: Argentina
- Fourth place: Iran

Tournament awards
- MVP: (Poland) Bartosz Kurek

The X Memorial of Hubert Jerzy Wagner was held at CRS Hall in Zielona Góra, Poland from 20 to 22 July 2012. Like the previous edition, 4 teams participated in the tournament.

== Qualification ==
All teams except the host must receive an invitation from the organizers.

Africa (CAVB)	Asia and Oceania (AVC)	Europe (CEV)	North, Central America and Caribbean (NORCECA)	South America (CSV)
	Wild card: Iran	Host nation: Poland; Wild card: Germany		Wild card: Argentina

== Venue ==
Zielona Góra, Poland
CRS Hall
Capacity: 6,080
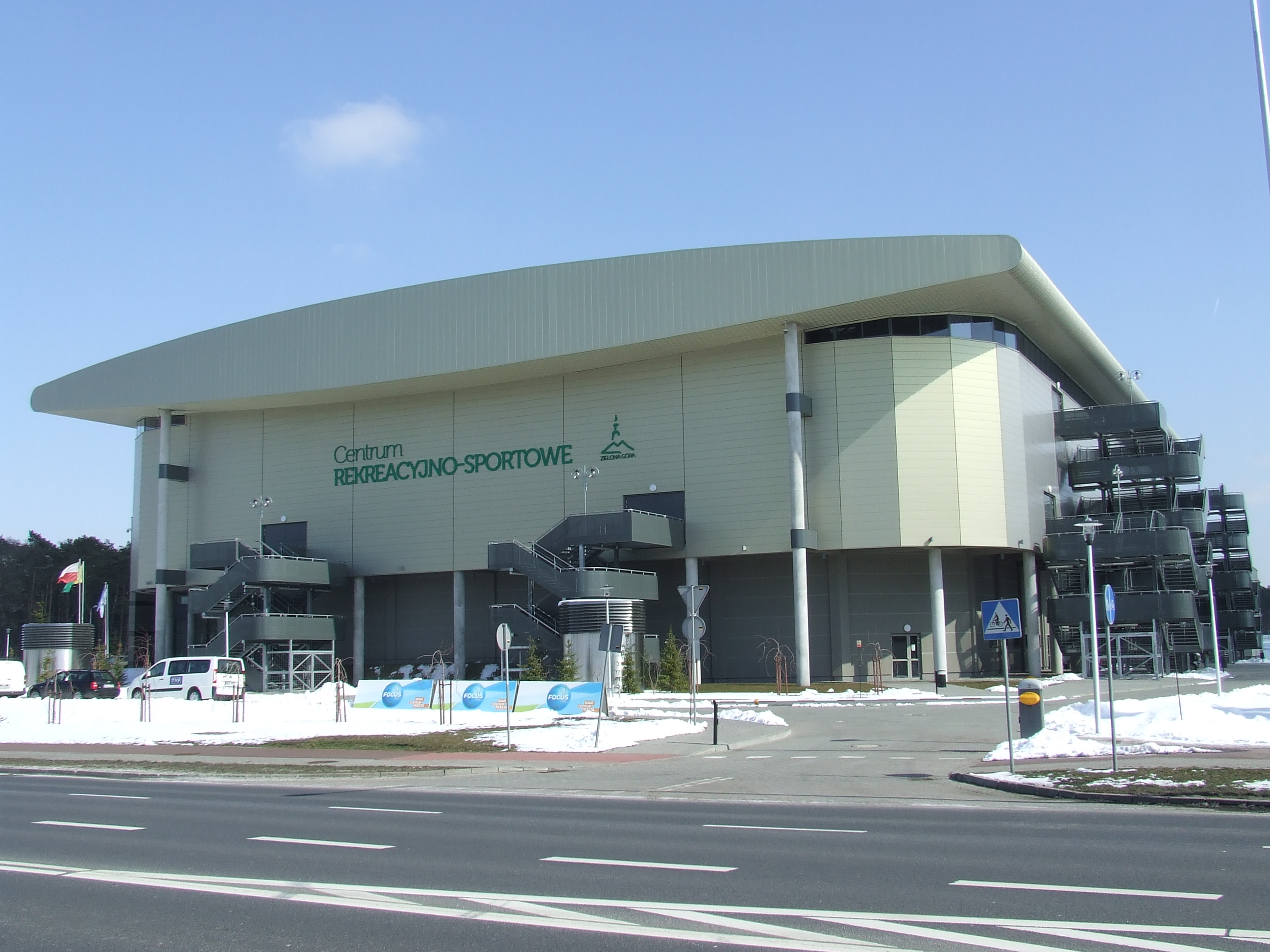

== Results ==
- All times are Central European Summer Time (UTC+02:00).

Pos	Team	Pld	W	L	Pts	SPW	SPL	SPR	SW	SL	SR
1	Poland	3	3	0	9	254	226	1.124	9	1	9.000
2	Germany	3	2	1	6	274	251	1.092	7	4	1.750
3	Argentina	3	1	2	2	253	274	0.923	4	5	0.800
4	Iran	3	0	3	1	226	256	0.883	2	9	0.222

Source: Flashscore

Date	Time		Score		Set 1	Set 2	Set 3	Set 4	Set 5	Total	Report
20 Jul	18:00	Germany	3–1	Argentina	25–23	25–23	21–25	25–19		96–90	Report
20 Jul	20:00	Poland	3–0	Iran	26–24	25–20	25–21			76–65	Report
21 Jul	14:00	Argentina	3–2	Iran	25–16	18–25	25–22	20–25	17–15	105–103	Report
21 Jul	16:30	Poland	3–1	Germany	36–34	25–23	17–25	25–21		103–103	Report
22 Jul	14:00	Germany	3–0	Iran	25–18	25–20	25–20			75–58	Report
22 Jul	16:30	Poland	3–0	Argentina	25–19	25–23	25–16			75–58	Report

== Final standing ==
Rank	Team
1st place, gold medalist(s)	Poland
2nd place, silver medalist(s)	Germany
3rd place, bronze medalist(s)	Argentina
4	Iran

2012 Memorial of Hubert Jerzy Wagner

Poland
4th title

9–man Roster
Winiarski, Kosok, Bartman, Kubiak, Żygadło, Możdżonek, Ignaczak, Ruciak, Jarosz
Head coach
Anastasi

== Awards ==
- Best scorer: (Poland) Zbigniew Bartman
- Best spiker: (Poland) Michał Winiarski
- Best blocker: (Germany) Marcus Böhme
- Best server: (Germany) György Grozer
- Best setter: (Poland) Łukasz Żygadło
- Best libero: (Germany) Markus Steuerwald
- MVP: (Poland) Bartosz Kurek
