= Marlon Muraguti Yared =

Brazilian volleyball player (born 1977)

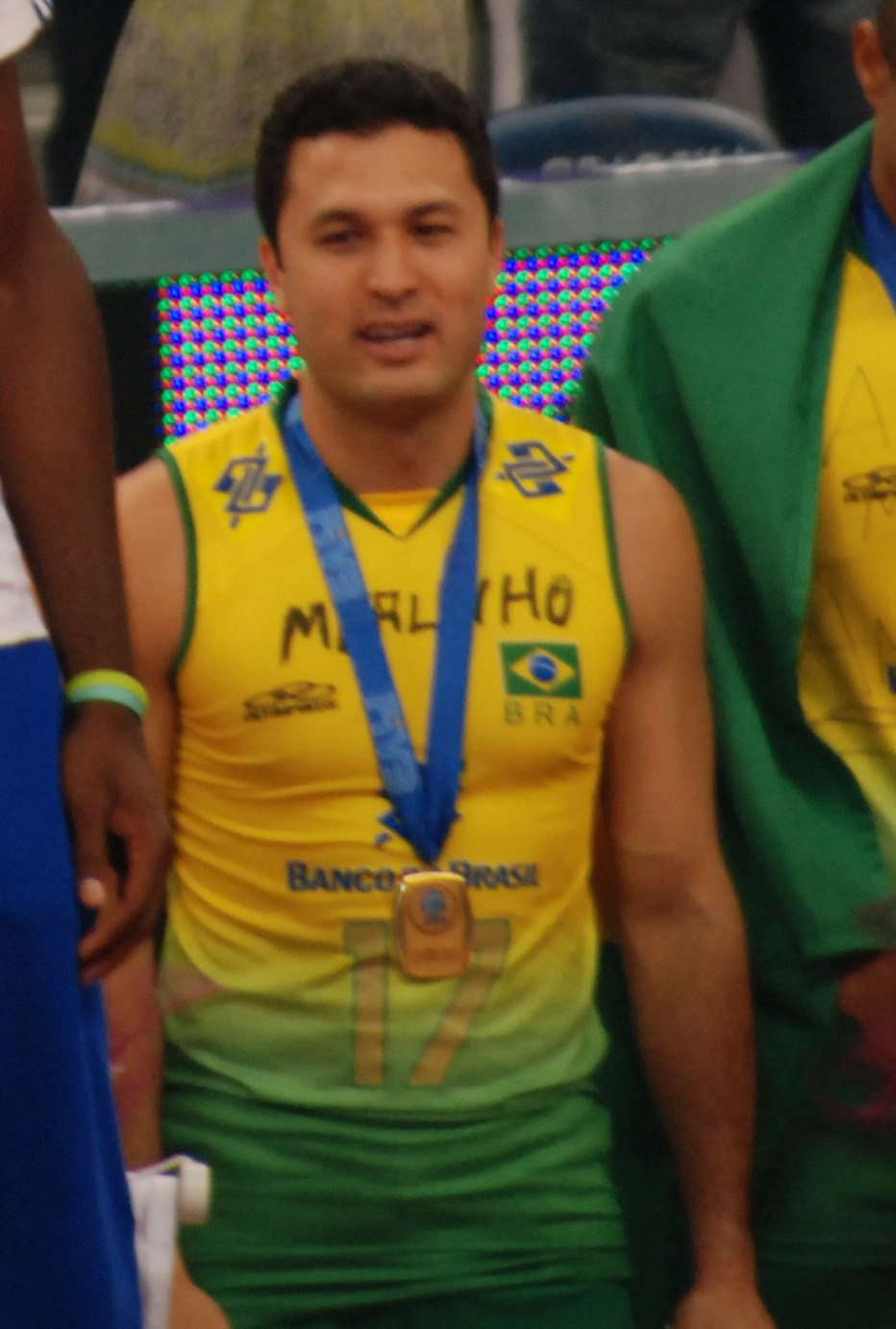

Personal information
- Born: 27 July 1977 (age 49) Guaíra, Paraná, Brazil
- Height: 1.88 m (6 ft 2 in)
- Weight: 82 kg (181 lb)
- Spike: 310 cm (122 in)
- Block: 289 cm (114 in)

Volleyball information
- Position: Setter
- Current club: Unimed Aero Club - Natal
- Number: 4

Career
- Years: Team
- 1990–1993 1996–1999 1999–2003 2003–2004 2004–2006 2006–2007 2007–2008 2008–2009 2008–2009 2009–2010 2010–2011 2011–2012 2012–2015 2015–2016 2016–2017 2016–2017 2017–2019 2019–: Sadia/Concórdia; Olympikus; EC Unisul; ECUS/Suzano; Minas Tênis Clube; Calzedonia Verona; Piemonte Volley; EC Banespa; São Bernardo Vôlei; Vôlei Renata; Minas Tênis Clube; RJX; Dinamo Krasnodar; Bento Vôlei; São Bernardo Vôlei; Belogorie Belgorod; Minas Tênis Clube; SESC-RJ

National team
- Years: Team
- 2008–2012: Brazil
Honours
Men's volleyball
Representing Brazil
World Championship
Gold medal – first place	2010 Italy	Team
World Cup
Bronze medal – third place	2011 Japan	Team
World Grand Champions Cup
Gold medal – first place	2009 Japan	Team
World League
Gold medal – first place	2009 Belgrade	Team
Gold medal – first place	2010 Córdoba	Team
Silver medal – second place	2011 Gdańsk	Team
South American Championship
Gold medal – first place	2011 Cuiabá	Team

Marlon Muraguti Yared (born 27 July 1977) is a Brazilian male volleyball player. He was part of the Brazil men's national volleyball team at the 2010 FIVB Volleyball Men's World Championship in Italy. He played for RJX.

== Sporting achievements ==
=== Individual ===
- 2010 Memorial of Hubert Jerzy Wagner – Best Setter
