= 2019 Memorial of Hubert Jerzy Wagner =

Tournament details
- Host country: Poland
- Dates: 1 – 3 August
- Teams: 4
- Venue: 1 (in 1 host city)

Final positions
- Champions: Brazil (2nd title)
- Runners-up: Poland
- Third place: Serbia
- Fourth place: Finland

Tournament awards
- MVP: (Brazil) Yoandy Leal

The XVII Memorial of Hubert Jerzy Wagner was a volleyball tournament held at Tauron Arena in Kraków, Poland from 1 to 3 August 2019. As in the previous editions, four teams participated in the tournament.

== Qualification ==
All teams except the host must have received an invitation from the organizers.

Africa (CAVB)	Asia and Oceania (AVC)	Europe (CEV)	North, Central America and Caribbean (NORCECA)	South America (CSV)
		Host nation: Poland; Wild card: Finland; Serbia		Wild card: Brazil

== Venue ==
Kraków, Poland
Tauron Arena
Capacity: 15,328
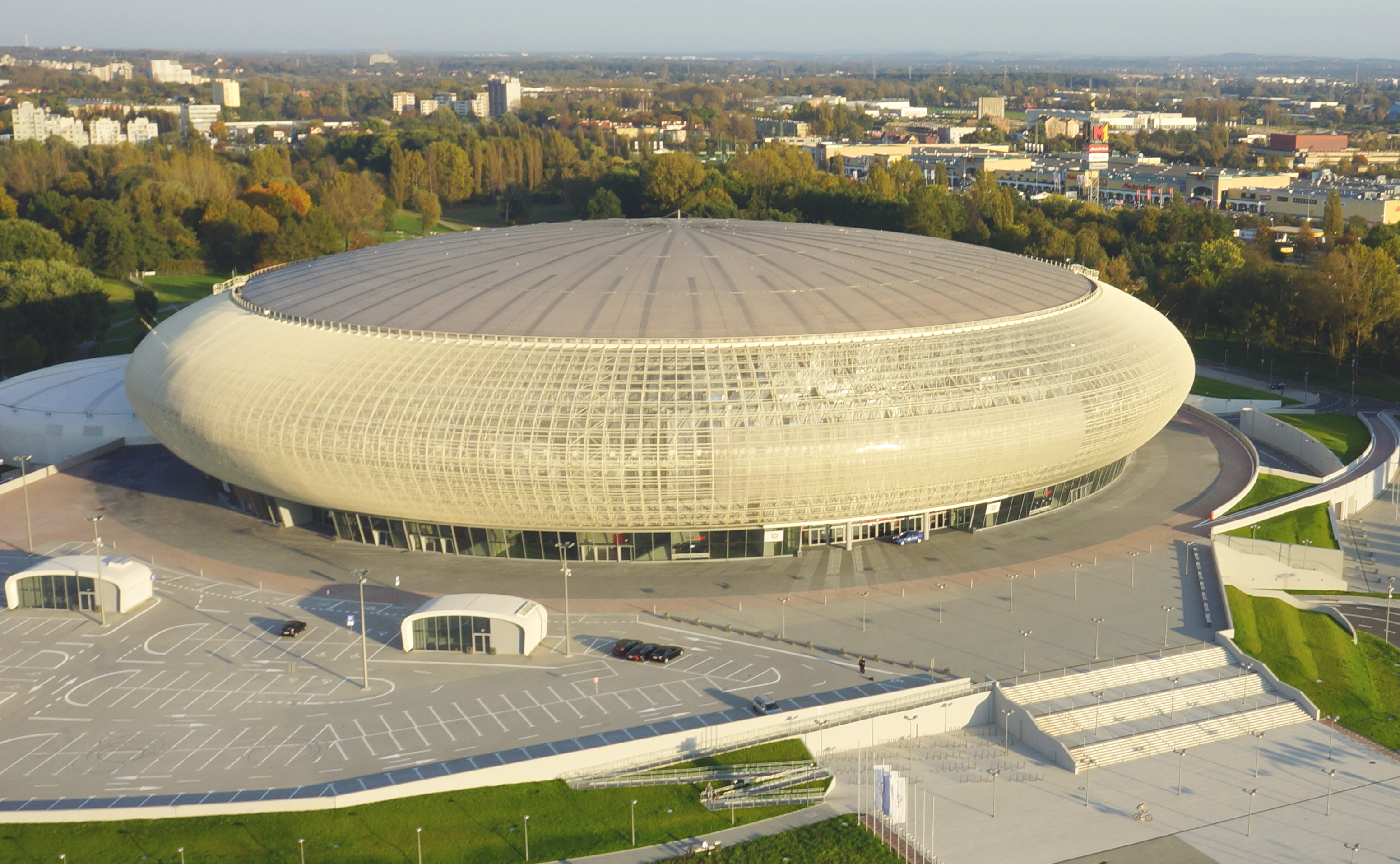

== Results ==
All times are local Central European Summer Time (UTC+2).

=== Ranking ===
Pos	Team	Pld	W	L	Pts	SW	SL	SR	SPW	SPL	SPR
1	Brazil	3	3	0	9	9	1	9.000	250	193	1.295
2	Poland	3	2	1	6	7	4	1.750	266	241	1.104
3	Serbia	3	1	2	3	4	7	0.571	242	264	0.917
4	Finland	3	0	3	0	1	9	0.111	189	249	0.759

Source: Flashscore

Date	Time		Score		Set 1	Set 2	Set 3	Set 4	Set 5	Total	Report
1 Aug	17:00	Poland	3–1	Serbia	25–22	25–18	22–25	25–22		97–87	Report
1 Aug	20:00	Brazil	3–0	Finland	25–15	25–12	25–16			75–43	Report
2 Aug	17:30	Poland	1–3	Brazil	20–25	25–21	27–29	22–25		94–100	Report
2 Aug	20:30	Finland	1–3	Serbia	25–21	20–25	21–25	26–28		92–99	Report
3 Aug	12:00	Serbia	0–3	Brazil	22–25	20–25	14–25			56–75	Report
3 Aug	15:00	Poland	3–0	Finland	25–19	25–16	25–19			75–54	Report

== Final standing ==
Rank	Team
1st place, gold medalist(s)	Brazil
2nd place, silver medalist(s)	Poland
3rd place, bronze medalist(s)	Serbia
4	Finland

2019 Memorial of Hubert Jerzy Wagner winners

Brazil
2nd title

Bruno Rezende (C), Fernando Kreling, Wallace de Souza, Alan Souza, Isac Santos, Maurício Souza, Lucas Saatkamp, Flávio Gualberto, Yoandy Leal, Douglas Souza, Ricardo Lucarelli Souza, Maurício Borges Silva, Thales Hoss, Maique Nascimento
Head coach
Renan Dal Zotto

== Awards ==
- Most valuable player
  (Brazil) Yoandy Leal
- Best setter
  (Poland) Fabian Drzyzga
- Best server
  (Brazil) Wallace de Souza
- Best receiver
  (Brazil) Maurício Borges Silva
- Best blocker
  (Poland) Karol Kłos
- Best opposite spiker
  (Poland) Dawid Konarski
- Best libero
  (Finland) Lauri Kerminen
