= 2013 Memorial of Hubert Jerzy Wagner =

Tournament details
- Host country: Poland
- Dates: 6 – 8 September
- Teams: 4
- Venue: 1 (in 1 host city)

Final positions
- Champions: Poland (5th title)
- Runners-up: Russia
- Third place: Netherlands
- Fourth place: Germany

Tournament awards
- MVP: (Russia) Nikolay Pavlov

The XI Memorial of Hubert Jerzy Wagner was held at Orlen Arena in Płock, Poland from 6 to 8 September 2013. As in the previous edition, four teams participated in the tournament.

== Qualification ==
All teams except the host must receive an invitation from the organizers.

Africa (CAVB)	Asia and Oceania (AVC)	Europe (CEV)	North, Central America and Caribbean (NORCECA)	South America (CSV)
		Host nation: Poland; Wild card: Russia; Germany; Netherlands		

== Venue ==
Płock, Poland
Orlen Arena
Capacity: 5,492
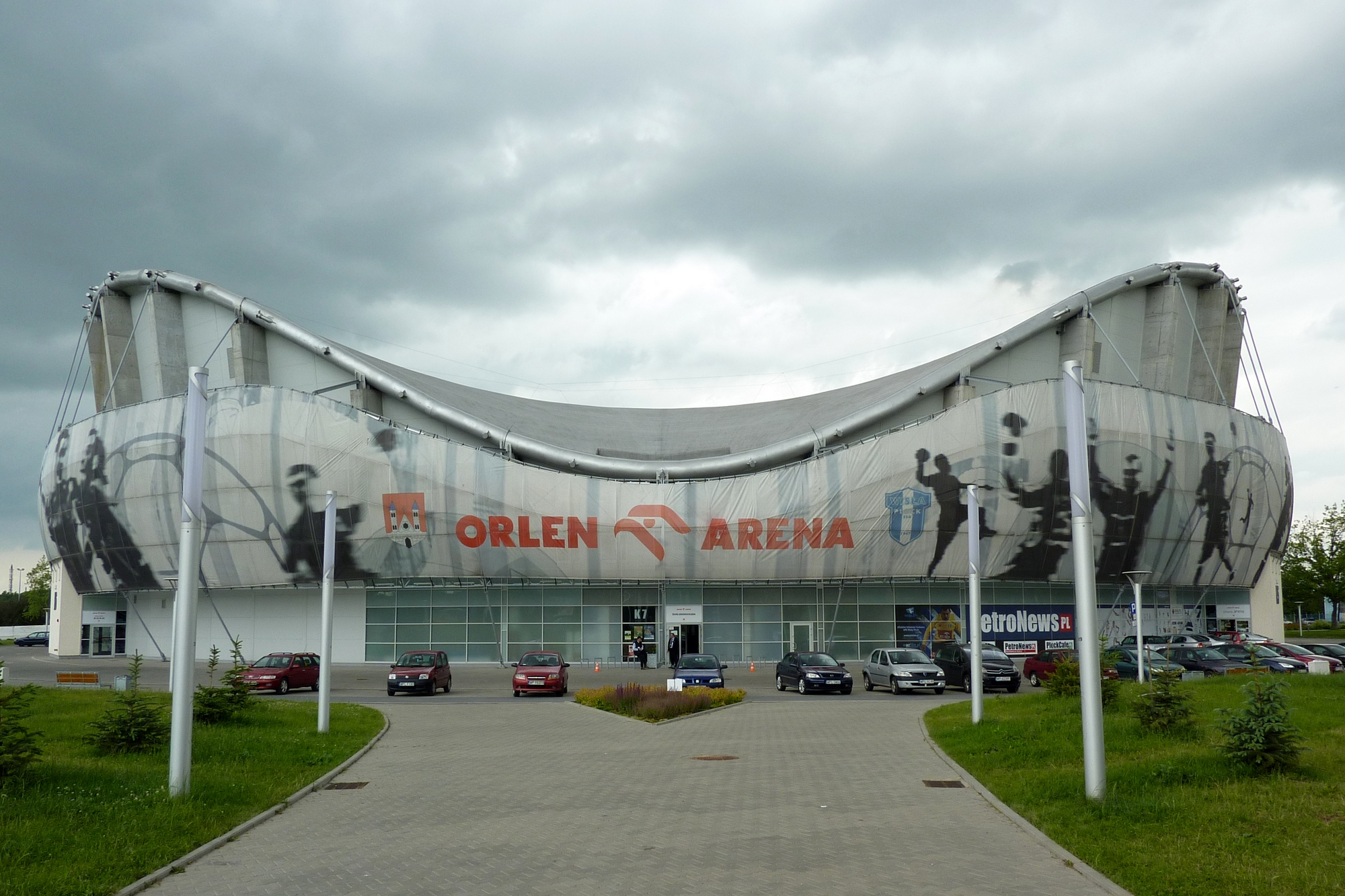

== Results ==
- All times are Central European Summer Time (UTC+02:00).

Pos	Team	Pld	W	L	Pts	SPW	SPL	SPR	SW	SL	SR
1	Poland	3	2	1	6	258	239	1.079	7	4	1.750
2	Russia	3	2	1	6	223	213	1.047	6	4	1.500
3	Netherlands	3	1	2	3	234	246	0.951	5	6	0.833
4	Germany	3	1	2	3	209	226	0.925	3	7	0.429

Source: Flashscore

Date	Time		Score		Set 1	Set 2	Set 3	Set 4	Set 5	Total	Report
6 Sep	17:00	Poland	3–1	Netherlands	26–28	25–22	25–15	25–18		101–83	Report
6 Sep	20:00	Germany	0–3	Russia	15–25	19–25	22–25			56–75	Report
7 Sep	14:30	Russia	0–3	Netherlands	21–25	21–25	19–25			61–75	Report
7 Sep	17:00	Poland	3–0	Germany	25–19	25–21	25–19			75–59	Report
8 Sep	17:00	Germany	3–1	Netherlands	25–21	25–14	19–25	25–16		94–76	Report
8 Sep	20:00	Poland	1–3	Russia	19–25	20–25	25–22	18–25		82–97	Report

== Final standing ==
Rank	Team
1st place, gold medalist(s)	Poland
2nd place, silver medalist(s)	Russia
3rd place, bronze medalist(s)	Netherlands
4	Germany

2013 Memorial of Hubert Jerzy Wagner

Poland
5th title

11–man roster
Żygadło, Bociek, Winiarski, Kubiak, Możdżonek, Nowakowski, Zatorski, Jarosz, Drzyzga, Włodarczyk, Wojtaszek
Head coach
Anastasi

== Awards ==
- Best scorer: (Russia) Nikolay Pavlov
- Best receiver: (Poland) Michał Kubiak
- Best blocker: (Poland) Marcin Możdżonek
- Best server: (Russia) Dmitriy Muserskiy
- Best setter: (Russia) Sergey Grankin
- Best libero: (Poland) Paweł Zatorski
- MVP: (Russia) Nikolay Pavlov
