= Memorial of Hubert Jerzy Wagner =

Volleyball competition

- Current season, competition or edition: 2026 Memorial of Hubert Jerzy Wagner
- Sport: Volleyball
- Founded: 2003; 23 years ago
- No. of teams: 4
- Continent: World (FIVB)
- Most recent champion: Poland (12th title)
- Most titles: Poland (12 titles)
- Website: Memorial of Hubert Jerzy Wagner

The Memorial of Hubert Jerzy Wagner is a volleyball friendly competition for the national teams, currently held every year and organized by the Hubert Wagner Foundation.

The first Memorial was held in 2003. The competition has been held every year since, except 2020 due to the COVID-19 pandemic.

== Tournament ==
=== History ===
The tournament is played in the middle of the year, always about two weeks before the most important event of the year. Competitions have been created in memory of the best volleyball coach in Poland, Hubert Jerzy Wagner, who won the 1974 FIVB Men's Volleyball World Championship, the Olympic gold in 1976 and silver medals in the Men's European Volleyball Championship in 1975 and 1983 for the Polish team.

In the first few years teams played in Olsztyn. It is now played in various Polish cities to promote volleyball. In 2008, the memorial was also the qualifying tournament for the 2009 Men's European Volleyball Championship. The first memorial was won by the Dutch national team, which was ahead of Poland and Spain. In the second edition Russia triumphed, and the next again The Netherlands. The winner of the fourth edition was Poland, the fifth - Germany. The next two editions were again won by the hosts.

In 2010, the winners were Brazil, and in 2011 Italy. In 2012, the edition of the memorial was won by Poland ahead of Germany, Argentina and Iran. Poland retained the title in 2013.

== Results summary ==
#	Year	Host	Gold Medal	Silver Medal	Bronze Medal	4th Place	5th Place	6th place	7th place	8th place
1	2003; Details	(Poland); Olsztyn	Netherlands	Poland	Spain	Germany				
2	2004; Details	(Poland); Olsztyn / Iława	Russia	Poland	Netherlands	Australia	Poland"B"	Tunisia		
3	2005; Details	(Poland); Olsztyn / Iława	Netherlands	Poland	China	Norway				
4	2006; Details	(Poland); Olsztyn / Iława / Ostróda	Poland	Cuba	Canada	Italy	Portugal	Poland"B"	Egypt	Norway
5	2007; Details	(Poland); Olsztyn / Elbląg	Germany	Netherlands	Poland	Slovakia	Serbia	Great Britain		
6	2008; Details	(Poland); Olsztyn	Poland	Estonia	Montenegro	Hungary				
7	2009; Details	(Poland); Łódź	Poland	Italy	Serbia	China	Poland "B"	Spain		
8	2010; Details	(Poland); Bydgoszcz	Brazil	Bulgaria	Poland	Czech Republic				
9	2011; Details	(Poland); Katowice	Italy	Russia	Czech Republic	Poland				
10	2012; Details	(Poland); Zielona Góra	Poland	Germany	Argentina	Iran				
11	2013; Details	(Poland); Płock	Poland	Russia	Netherlands	Germany				
12	2014; Details	(Poland); Kraków	Russia	Poland	Bulgaria	China				
13	2015; Details	(Poland); Toruń	Poland	Japan	France	Iran				
14	2016; Details	(Poland); Kraków	Bulgaria	Serbia	Poland	Belgium				
15	2017; Details	(Poland); Kraków	Poland	France	Russia	Canada				
16	2018; Details	(Poland); Kraków	Poland	Russia	France	Canada				
17	2019; Details	(Poland); Kraków	Brazil	Poland	Serbia	Finland				
18	2021; Details	(Poland); Kraków	Poland	Egypt	Norway	Azerbaijan				
19	2022; Details	(Poland); Kraków	Poland	Argentina	Iran	Serbia				
20	2023; Details	(Poland); Kraków	Italy	Slovenia	Poland	France				
21	2024; Details	(Poland); Kraków	Poland	Slovenia	Germany	Egypt				
22	2025; Details	(Poland); Kraków	Argentina	Brazil	Poland	Serbia				
23	2026; Details	(Poland); Kraków	Poland	France	United States	Slovenia				

== National team appearances ==
Legend

- 1st – Champions
- 2nd – Runners-up
- 3rd – Third place
- 4th – Fourth place
- • – Did not enter / Did not invited
- Q – Invited for forthcoming tournament

Team	2003 (4)	2004 (6)	2005 (4)	2006 (8)	2007 (6)	2008 (4)	2009 (6)	2010 (4)	2011 (4)	2012 (4)	2013 (4)	2014 (4)	2015 (4)	2016 (4)	2017 (4)	2018 (4)	2019 (4)	2021 (4)	2022 (4)	2023 (4)	2024 (4)	2025 (4)	2026 (4)
Argentina	•	•	•	•	•	•	•	•	•	3rd	•	•	•	•	•	•	•	•	2nd	•	•	1st	•
Australia	•	4th	•	•	•	•	•	•	•	•	•	•	•	•	•	•	•	•	•	•	•	•	•
Azerbaijan	•	•	•	•	•	•	•	•	•	•	•	•	•	•	•	•	•	4th	•	•	•	•	•
Belgium	•	•	•	•	•	•	•	•	•	•	•	•	•	4th	•	•	•	•	•	•	•	•	•
Brazil	•	•	•	•	•	•	•	1st	•	•	•	•	•	•	•	•	1st	•	•	•	•	2nd	•
Bulgaria	•	•	•	•	•	•	•	2nd	•	•	•	3rd	•	1st	•	•	•	•	•	•	•	•	•
Canada	•	•	•	3rd	•	•	•	•	•	•	•	•	•	•	4th	4th	•	•	•	•	•	•	•
China	•	•	3rd	•	•	•	4th	•	•	•	•	4th	•	•	•	•	•	•	•	•	•	•	•
Cuba	•	•	•	2nd	•	•	•	•	•	•	•	•	•	•	•	•	•	•	•	•	•	•	•
Czech Republic	•	•	•	•	•	•	•	4th	3rd	•	•	•	•	•	•	•	•	•	•	•	•	•	•
Egypt	•	•	•	7th	•	•	•	•	•	•	•	•	•	•	•	•	•	2nd	•	•	4th	•	•
Estonia	•	•	•	•	•	2nd	•	•	•	•	•	•	•	•	•	•	•	•	•	•	•	•	•
Finland	•	•	•	•	•	•	•	•	•	•	•	•	•	•	•	•	4th	•	•	•	•	•	•
France	•	•	•	•	•	•	•	•	•	•	•	•	3rd	•	2nd	3rd	•	•	•	4th	•	•	2nd
Germany	4th	•	•	•	1st	•	•	•	•	2nd	4th	•	•	•	•	•	•	•	•	•	3rd	•	•
Great Britain	•	•	•	•	6th	•	•	•	•	•	•	•	•	•	•	•	•	•	•	•	•	•	•
Hungary	•	•	•	•	•	4th	•	•	•	•	•	•	•	•	•	•	•	•	•	•	•	•	•
Iran	•	•	•	•	•	•	•	•	•	4th	•	•	4th	•	•	•	•	•	3rd	•	•	•	•
Italy	•	•	•	4th	•	•	2nd	•	1st	•	•	•	•	•	•	•	•	•	•	1st	•	•	•
Japan	•	•	•	•	•	•	•	•	•	•	•	•	2nd	•	•	•	•	•	•	•	•	•	•
Montenegro	•	•	•	•	•	3rd	•	•	•	•	•	•	•	•	•	•	•	•	•	•	•	•	•
Netherlands	1st	3rd	1st	•	2nd	•	•	•	•	•	3rd	•	•	•	•	•	•	•	•	•	•	•	•
Norway	•	•	4th	8th	•	•	•	•	•	•	•	•	•	•	•	•	•	3rd	•	•	•	•	•
Poland	2nd	2nd	2nd	1st	3rd	1st	1st	3rd	4th	1st	1st	2nd	1st	3rd	1st	1st	2nd	1st	1st	3rd	1st	3rd	1st
Poland B	•	5th	•	6th	•	•	5th	•	•	•	•	•	•	•	•	•	•	•	•	•	•	•	•
Portugal	•	•	•	5th	•	•	•	•	•	•	•	•	•	•	•	•	•	•	•	•	•	•	•
Russia	•	1st	•	•	•	•	•	•	2nd	•	2nd	1st	•	•	3rd	2nd	•	•	•	•	•	•	•
Serbia	•	•	•	•	5th	•	3rd	•	•	•	•	•	•	2nd	•	•	3rd	•	4th	•	•	4th	•
Slovakia	•	•	•	•	4th	•	•	•	•	•	•	•	•	•	•	•	•	•	•	•	•	•	•
Slovenia	•	•	•	•	•	•	•	•	•	•	•	•	•	•	•	•	•	•	•	2nd	2nd	•	4th
Spain	3rd	•	•	•	•	•	6th	•	•	•	•	•	•	•	•	•	•	•	•	•	•	•	•
Tunisia	•	6th	•	•	•	•	•	•	•	•	•	•	•	•	•	•	•	•	•	•	•	•	•
United States	•	•	•	•	•	•	•	•	•	•	•	•	•	•	•	•	•	•	•	•	•	•	3rd

Africa (CAVB)	Asia and Oceania (AVC)	Europe (CEV)	North, Central America and Caribbean (NORCECA)	South America (CSV)
Egypt (3); Tunisia (1)	China (3); Iran (3); Australia (1); Japan (1)	Poland (23); Russia (6); Serbia (6); France (5); Germany (5); Netherlands (5); Italy (4); Bulgaria (3); Norway (3); Poland B (3); Slovenia (3); Czech Republic (2); Spain (2); Azerbaijan (1); Belgium (1); Estonia (1); Finland (1); Great Britain (1); Hungary (1); Montenegro (1); Portugal (1); Slovakia (1)	Canada (3); Cuba (1); United States (1)	Argentina (3); Brazil (3)

== Medals summary ==
Rank	Nation	Gold	Silver	Bronze	Total
1	Poland	12	5	5	22
2	Russia	2	3	1	6
3	Netherlands	2	1	2	5
4	Brazil	2	1	0	3
4	Italy	2	1	0	3
6	Argentina	1	1	1	3
6	Bulgaria	1	1	1	3
6	Germany	1	1	1	3
9	France	0	2	2	4
10	Slovenia	0	2	0	2
11	Serbia	0	1	2	3
12	Cuba	0	1	0	1
12	Egypt	0	1	0	1
12	Estonia	0	1	0	1
12	Japan	0	1	0	1
16	Canada	0	0	1	1
16	China	0	0	1	1
16	Czech Republic	0	0	1	1
16	Iran	0	0	1	1
16	Montenegro	0	0	1	1
16	Norway	0	0	1	1
16	Spain	0	0	1	1
16	United States	0	0	1	1
Totals (23 entries)		23	23	23	69

== Most valuable player by edition ==
- 2003 – Richard Schuil (NED)
- 2004 – Sergey Tetyukhin (RUS)
- 2005 – Marko Klok (NED)
- 2006 – Sebastian Świderski (POL)
- 2007 – Jochen Schöps (GER)
- 2008 – Mariusz Wlazły (POL)
- 2009 – Bartosz Kurek (POL)
- 2010 – Murilo Endres (BRA)
- 2011 – Cristian Savani (ITA)
- 2012 – Bartosz Kurek (POL)
- 2013 – Nikolay Pavlov (RUS)
- 2014 – Dmitry Muserskiy (RUS)
- 2015 – Michał Kubiak (POL)
- 2016 – Tsvetan Sokolov (BUL)
- 2017 – Maxim Mikhaylov (RUS)
- 2018 – Artur Szalpuk (POL)
- 2019 – Yoandy Leal (BRA)
- 2021 – Wilfredo León (POL)
- 2022 – Jakub Kochanowski (POL)
- 2023 – Simone Giannelli (ITA)
- 2024 – Kamil Semeniuk (POL)
- 2025 – Pablo Kukartsev (ARG)
- 2026 – Bartłomiej Bołądź (POL)

== See also ==
- Hubert Wagner
- Memorial of Agata Mróz-Olszewska
- Individual awards for players of Polish men's national team
- Montreux Volley Masters
- VTV International Women's Volleyball Cup
- William Jones Cup
- FIBA Intercontinental Cup
- Merlion Cup (basketball)
- Guystac Trophy
- IIHF Development Cup
- Intersport Cup
- Carpathian Trophy (women's handball)
- Carpathian Trophy (men's handball)
- Cornacchia World Cup since 1983 - U19 / U17 (Boys / Girls) in Pordenone
