= 2022 Hubert Jerzy Wagner Memorial =

Volleyball tournament

2022 Memorial of Hubert Jerzy Wagner
Tournament details
- Host country: Poland
- Dates: 18–20 August 2022
- Teams: 4
- Venue: 1 (in 1 host city)

Final positions
- Champions: Poland (10th title)
- Runners-up: Argentina
- Third place: Iran
- Fourth place: Serbia

Tournament awards
- MVP: (Poland) Jakub Kochanowski
- Best Setter: (Poland) Marcin Janusz
- Best OH: (Poland) Kamil Semeniuk
- Best MB: (Poland) Jakub Kochanowski
- Best OPP: (Argentina) Ezequiel Palacios
- Best Libero: (Serbia) Nikola Peković

The XIX Memorial of Hubert Jerzy Wagner was a volleyball tournament held at Tauron Arena in Kraków, Poland from 18 to 20 August 2022. It was held a week before the 2022 FIVB Men's Volleyball World Championship.

Like the previous editions, four teams participated in the tournament. Volleyball Nations League bronze medalist Poland, Asian champions Iran, Olympic bronze medalist winner Argentina and European champion Serbia.

== Qualification ==
All teams except the host must have received an invitation from the organizers.

Africa (CAVB)	Asia and Oceania (AVC)	Europe (CEV)	North, Central America and Caribbean (NORCECA)	South America (CSV)
	Wild card: Iran	Host nation: Poland; Wild card: Serbia		Wild card: Argentina

== Results ==
All times are local Central European Summer Time (UTC+2).

=== Ranking ===
Pos	Team	Pld	W	L	Pts	SW	SL	SR	SPW	SPL	SPR
1	Poland	3	3	0	9	9	0	MAX	229	192	1.193
2	Argentina	3	1	2	4	5	7	0.714	262	267	0.981
3	Iran	3	1	2	3	5	8	0.625	271	294	0.922
4	Serbia	3	1	2	2	4	8	0.500	262	271	0.967

Source: Flashscore

Date	Time		Score		Set 1	Set 2	Set 3	Set 4	Set 5	Total	Report
18 Aug	17:30	Argentina	3–1	Serbia	25–21	19–25	25–22	25–18		94–86	Report
18 Aug	20:00	Poland	3–0	Iran	25–19	29–27	25–17			79–63	Report
19 Aug	17:30	Iran	2–3	Serbia	21–25	25–20	20–25	26–24	10–15	102–109	Report
19 Aug	20:00	Poland	3–0	Argentina	25–22	25–22	25–18			75–62	Report
20 Aug	16:00	Iran	3–2	Argentina	25–21	22–25	19–25	25–22	15–13	106–106	[ Report]
20 Aug	18:30	Poland	3–0	Serbia	25–22	25–23	25–22			75–67	Report

== Final standing ==
Rank	Team
1st place, gold medalist(s)	Poland
2nd place, silver medalist(s)	Argentina
3rd place, bronze medalist(s)	Iran
4	Serbia

2022 Memorial of Hubert Jerzy Wagner winners

Poland
10th title

Jakub Popiwczak, Łukasz Kaczmarek, Bartosz Kurek, Karol Kłos, Fabian Drzyzga, Grzegorz Łomacz, Aleksander Śliwka, Jakub Kochanowski, Kamil Semeniuk, Paweł Zatorski, Bartosz Kwolek, Marcin Janusz, Mateusz Bieniek, Tomasz Fornal, Mateusz Poręba
Head coach
Nikola Grbić

== Awards ==
- Most valuable player
  (Poland) Jakub Kochanowski
- Best setter
  (Poland) Marcin Janusz
- Best server
  (Iran) Saber Kazemi
- Best receiver
  (Poland) Kamil Semeniuk
- Best blocker
  (Poland) Jakub Kochanowski
- Best spiker
  (Argentina) Ezequiel Palacios
- Best libero
  (Serbia) Nikola Peković
