= Marcin Wika =

Polish volleyball player (born 1983)

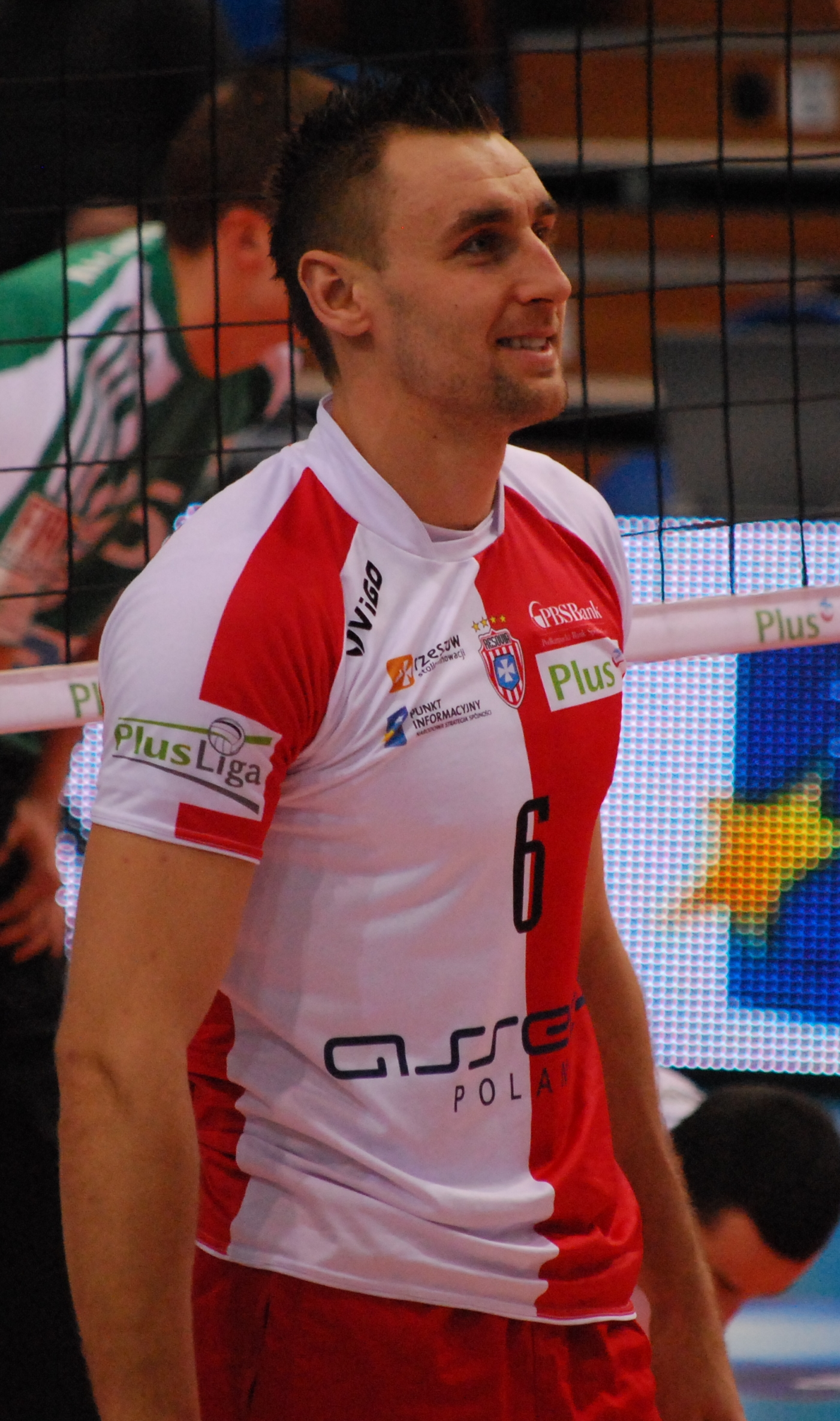

Personal information
- Full name: Marcin Wika
- Nationality: Polish
- Born: 9 November 1983 (age 42); Puck, Poland
- Height: 1.94 m (6 ft 4 in)
- Weight: 94 kg (207 lb)
- Spike: 338 cm (133 in)
- Block: 320 cm (130 in)

Volleyball information
- Position: Outside hitter
- Current team: Espadon Szczecin
- Number: 13

Career
Years	Teams
2002–2003; 2003–2006; 2006–2008; 2008–2010; 2010–2011; 2011–2014; 2014–2015; 2015–2016; 2016–	Korab Puck; Górnik Radlin; Jastrzębski Węgiel; AZS Częstochowa; Asseco Resovia Rzeszów; Jastrzębski Węgiel; Transfer Bydgoszcz; PV Lugano; BBTS Bielsko-Biała; Espadon Szczecin

National team
2008–2009	Poland
- Last updated: 6 February 2017

Marcin Wika (born 9 November 1983) is a Polish volleyball player, a member of Poland men's national volleyball team in 2008-2009 and Polish club Espadon Szczecin, a participant of the Olympic Games Beijing 2008,

== Personal life ==
Wika was born in Puck, Poland. He is married to Anna (née Białobrzeska), who is also a volleyball player. They have two children - daughter Aleksandra and son Oskar (born 2012).

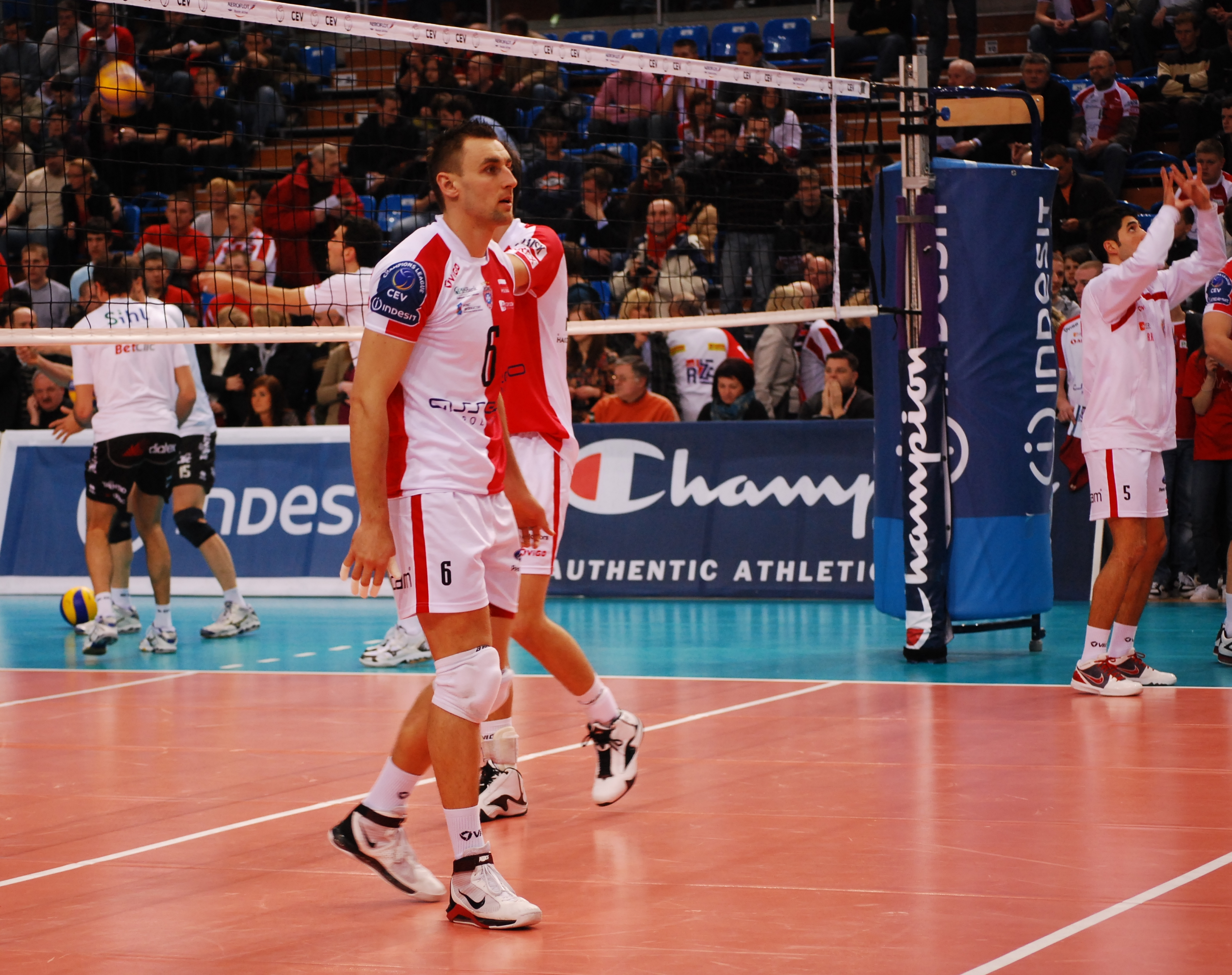
Wika as a player of Asseco Resovia Rzeszów in 2010.

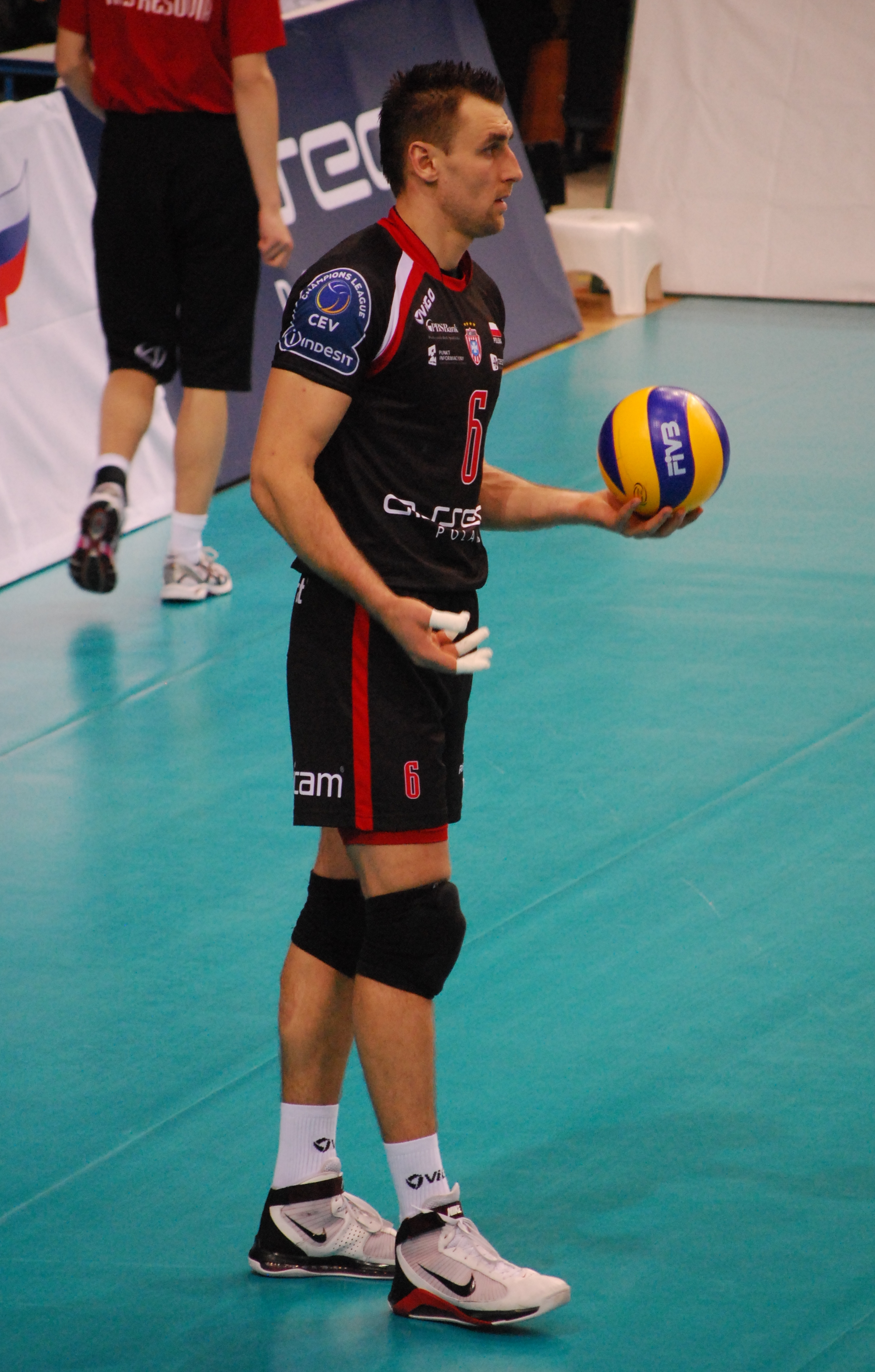
Wika as a player of Asseco Resovia Rzeszów in 2010.

== Career ==
=== Clubs ===
He is Polish Champion in season 2003/2004, silver medalist of Polish Championship 2005/2006 with Jastrzębski Węgiel. In 2006 moved to Wkręt-met Domex AZS Częstochowa. He won with club from Częstochowa Polish Cup and silver medal of Polish Championship 2007/2008. Next 2 seasons spent in Asseco Resovia Rzeszów. He won silver (2008/2009) and bronze medal (2009/2010) of Polish Championship. In 2010/2011 spent in Jastrzębski Węgiel. In 2011-2014 was a player of Transfer Bydgoszcz.

== Sporting achievements ==
=== Clubs ===
==== National championship ====
- 2003/2004 Polish Championship, with Jastrzębski Węgiel
- 2005/2006 Polish Championship, with Jastrzębski Węgiel
- 2007/2008 Polish Cup, with Wkręt-met Domex AZS Częstochowa
- 2007/2008 Polish Championship, with Wkręt-met Domex AZS Częstochowa
- 2008/2009 Polish Championship, with Asseco Resovia Rzeszów
- 2009/2010 Polish Championship, with Asseco Resovia Rzeszów
- 2014/2015 Swiss Championship, with PV Lugano

=== Individually ===
- 2008 Memorial of Zdzisław Ambroziak - Best Server
- 2008 Polish Cup - Best Server
- 2008 Polish Cup - Most Valuable Player
- 2008 Memorial of Hubert Jerzy Wagner - Best Receiver
