= 2021 Memorial of Hubert Jerzy Wagner =

Polish volleyball tournament

Tournament details
- Host country: Poland
- Dates: 9–11 July 2021
- Teams: 4
- Venue: 1 (in 1 host city)

Final positions
- Champions: Poland (9th title)
- Runners-up: Egypt
- Third place: Norway
- Fourth place: Azerbaijan

Tournament awards
- MVP: (Poland) Wilfredo León

The XVIII Memorial of Hubert Jerzy Wagner was a volleyball tournament held at Tauron Arena in Kraków, Poland. As in the previous editions, four teams participated in the tournament.

Initially, the tournament was scheduled to be played in 2020, but due to the COVID-19 pandemic, it was postponed to 2021.

== Qualification ==
All teams except the host must have received an invitation from the organizers.

| Africa (CAVB) | Asia and Oceania (AVC) | Europe (CEV) | North, Central America and Caribbean (NORCECA) | South America (CSV) |
| Wild card: Egypt | | Host nation: Poland; Wild card: Azerbaijan; Norway | | |

== Venue ==
Kraków, Poland
Tauron Arena
Capacity: 15,328
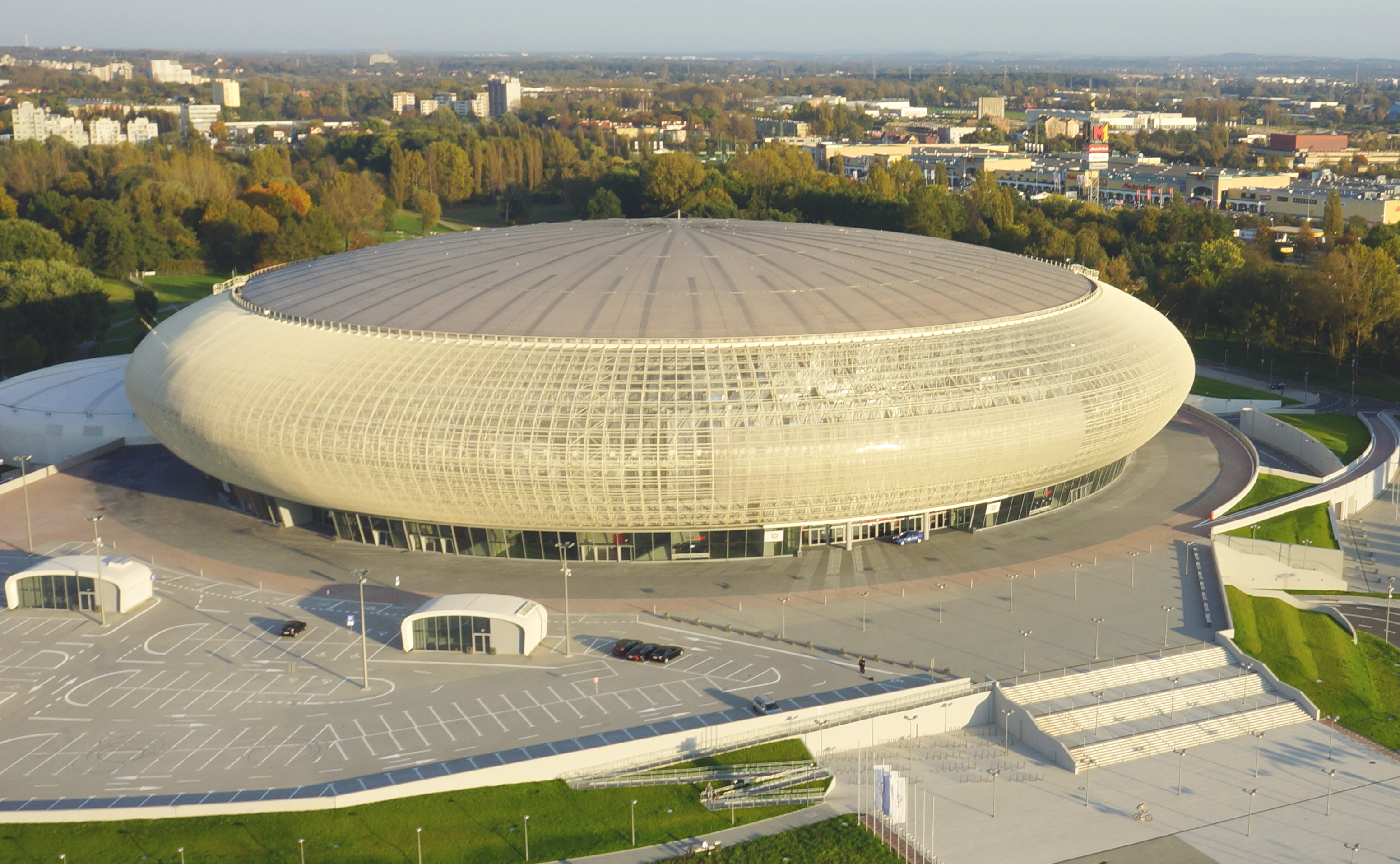

== Results ==
All times are local Central European Summer Time (UTC+2).

=== Ranking ===
| Pos | Team | Pld | W | L | Pts | SW | SL | SR | SPW | SPL | SPR |
|---|---|---|---|---|---|---|---|---|---|---|---|
| 1 | Poland | 3 | 3 | 0 | 9 | 9 | 0 | MAX | 226 | 140 | 1.614 |
| 2 | Egypt | 3 | 2 | 1 | 5 | 6 | 5 | 1.200 | 238 | 227 | 1.048 |
| 3 | Norway | 3 | 1 | 2 | 4 | 5 | 6 | 0.833 | 230 | 232 | 0.991 |
| 4 | Azerbaijan | 3 | 0 | 3 | 0 | 0 | 9 | 0.000 | 130 | 225 | 0.578 |

Source: Flashscore

| Date | Time | | Score | | Set 1 | Set 2 | Set 3 | Set 4 | Set 5 | Total | Report |
|---|---|---|---|---|---|---|---|---|---|---|---|
| 9 Jul | 15:00 | Azerbaijan | 0–3 | Egypt | 16–25 | 11–25 | 16–25 | | | 43–75 | Report |
| 9 Jul | 18:00 | Poland | 3–0 | Norway | 25–13 | 25–14 | 25–20 | | | 75–47 | Report |
| 10 Jul | 15:00 | Norway | 2–3 | Egypt | 21–25 | 25–22 | 25–19 | 24–26 | 13–15 | 108–107 | Report |
| 10 Jul | 18:00 | Poland | 3–0 | Azerbaijan | 25–15 | 25–12 | 25–10 | | | 75–37 | Report |
| 11 Jul | 13:00 | Azerbaijan | 0–3 | Norway | 19–25 | 17–25 | 14–25 | | | 50–75 | Report |
| 11 Jul | 16:00 | Poland | 3–0 | Egypt | 25–13 | 26–24 | 25–19 | | | 76–56 | Report |

== Final standing ==
| Rank | Team |
|---|---|
| 1st place, gold medalist(s) | Poland |
| 2nd place, silver medalist(s) | Egypt |
| 3rd place, bronze medalist(s) | Norway |
| 4 | Azerbaijan |

2021 Memorial of Hubert Jerzy Wagner winners

Poland
9th title

Piotr Nowakowski, Łukasz Kaczmarek, Bartosz Kurek, Wilfredo León, Fabian Drzyzga, Grzegorz Łomacz, Michał Kubiak, Aleksander Śliwka, Jakub Kochanowski, Kamil Semeniuk, Paweł Zatorski, Mateusz Bieniek, Tomasz Fornal, Norbert Huber
Head coach
Vital Heynen

== Awards ==
- Most valuable player
  (Poland) Wilfredo León
- Best setter
  (Poland) Fabian Drzyzga
- Best server
  (Poland) Mateusz Bieniek
- Best receiver
  (Egypt) Mohamed Issa
- Best blocker
  (Poland) Piotr Nowakowski
- Best spiker
  (Poland) Bartosz Kurek
- Best libero
  (Poland) Paweł Zatorski
