= Individual awards for players of Polish men's national team =

List players of Polish men's volleyball national team, who received individual awards in volleyball tournaments.

== Official tournaments ==
Tournament	Year	Player		Category	Team result
(Germany) CEV European Championship	2003	Piotr Gruszka	A	Best Spiker	5th
(Japan) FIVB World Championship	2006	Paweł Zagumny	A	Best Setter	2nd place, silver medalist(s)
(Poland) FIVB World League	2007	Paweł Zagumny	A	Best Setter	4th
(China) Olympic Games	2008	Paweł Zagumny	A	Best Setter	5th
(China) Olympic Games	2008	Michał Winiarski	A	Best Receiver	5th
(China) Olympic Games	2008	Sebastian Świderski	A	Best Spiker	5th
(Turkey) CEV European Championship	2009	Paweł Zagumny	A	Best Setter	1st place, gold medalist(s)
(Turkey) CEV European Championship	2009	Piotr Gruszka	A	Most Valuable Player	1st place, gold medalist(s)
(Poland) FIVB World League	2011	Bartosz Kurek	A	Best Scorer	3rd place, bronze medalist(s)
(Poland) FIVB World League	2011	Krzysztof Ignaczak	A	Best Libero	3rd place, bronze medalist(s)
(Austria) (Czech Republic) CEV European Championship	2011	Bartosz Kurek	A	Best Server	3rd place, bronze medalist(s)
(Japan) FIVB World Cup	2011	Marcin Możdżonek	A	Best Blocker	2nd place, silver medalist(s)
(Bulgaria) FIVB World League	2012	Zbigniew Bartman	A	Best Spiker	1st place, gold medalist(s)
(Bulgaria) FIVB World League	2012	Marcin Możdżonek	A	Best Blocker	1st place, gold medalist(s)
(Bulgaria) FIVB World League	2012	Krzysztof Ignaczak	A	Best Libero	1st place, gold medalist(s)
(Bulgaria) FIVB World League	2012	Bartosz Kurek	A	Most Valuable Player	1st place, gold medalist(s)
(United Kingdom) Olympic Games	2012	Krzysztof Ignaczak	A	Best Receiver	5th
(Poland) FIVB World Championship	2014	Karol Kłos	A	Best Middle Blocker	1st place, gold medalist(s)
(Poland) FIVB World Championship	2014	Mariusz Wlazły	A	Best Opposite Spiker	1st place, gold medalist(s)
(Poland) FIVB World Championship	2014	Mariusz Wlazły	A	Most Valuable Player	1st place, gold medalist(s)
(Brazil) FIVB World League	2015	Michał Kubiak	A	Best Outside Spiker	4th
(Brazil) FIVB World League	2015	Paweł Zatorski	A	Best Libero	4th
(Poland) European League	2015	Jan Nowakowski	B	Best Middle Blocker	3rd place, bronze medalist(s)
(Poland) European League	2015	Damian Wojtaszek	B	Best Libero	3rd place, bronze medalist(s)
(Italy) (Bulgaria) FIVB World Championship	2018	Michał Kubiak	A	Best Outside Spiker	1st place, gold medalist(s)
(Italy) (Bulgaria) FIVB World Championship	2018	Piotr Nowakowski	A	Best Middle Blocker	1st place, gold medalist(s)
(Italy) (Bulgaria) FIVB World Championship	2018	Paweł Zatorski	A	Best Libero	1st place, gold medalist(s)
(Italy) (Bulgaria) FIVB World Championship	2018	Bartosz Kurek	A	Most Valuable Player	1st place, gold medalist(s)
(United States) FIVB Nations League	2019	Bartosz Bednorz	A	Best Outside Spiker	3rd place, bronze medalist(s)
(Italy) FIVB Nations League	2021	Fabian Drzyzga	A	Best Setter	2nd place, silver medalist(s)
(Italy) FIVB Nations League	2021	Mateusz Bieniek	A	Best Middle Blocker	2nd place, silver medalist(s)
(Italy) FIVB Nations League	2021	Michał Kubiak	A	Best Outside Hitter	2nd place, silver medalist(s)
(Italy) FIVB Nations League	2021	Bartosz Kurek	A	Best Opposite Hitter; Most Valuable Player	2nd place, silver medalist(s)
(Poland) (Czech Republic) (Estonia) (Finland) CEV European Championship	2021	Piotr Nowakowski	A	Best Middle Blocker	3rd place, bronze medalist(s)
(Italy) FIVB Nations League	2022	Mateusz Bieniek	A	Best Middle Blocker	3rd place, bronze medalist(s)
(Poland) FIVB World Championship	2022	Mateusz Bieniek	A	Best Middle Blocker	2nd place, silver medalist(s)
(Poland) FIVB World Championship	2022	Kamil Semeniuk	A	Best Outside Hitter	2nd place, silver medalist(s)
(Poland) FIVB World Championship	2022	Bartosz Kurek	A	Best Opposite Hitter	2nd place, silver medalist(s)
(Poland) FIVB Nations League	2023	Paweł Zatorski	A	Most Valuable Player; Best Libero	1st place, gold medalist(s)
(Poland) FIVB Nations League	2023	Jakub Kochanowski	A	Best Middle Blocker	1st place, gold medalist(s)
(Poland) FIVB Nations League	2023	Aleksander Śliwka	A	Best Outside Hitter	1st place, gold medalist(s)
(Poland) FIVB Nations League	2023	Łukasz Kaczmarek	A	Best Opposite Hitter	1st place, gold medalist(s)
(Italy) (Bulgaria) (North Macedonia) (Israel) CEV European Championship	2023	Wilfredo León	A	Most Valuable Player	1st place, gold medalist(s)
(Poland) FIVB Nations League	2024	Tomasz Fornal	A	Best Outside Hitter	3rd place, bronze medalist(s)
(Poland) FIVB Nations League	2024	Jakub Kochanowski	A	Best Middle Blocker	3rd place, bronze medalist(s)
(France) 2024 Summer Olympics	2024	Jakub Kochanowski	A	Best Middle Blocker	2nd place, silver medalist(s)
(China) FIVB Nations League	2025	Jakub Kochanowski	A	Best Middle Blocker; Most Valuable Player	1st place, gold medalist(s)
(China) FIVB Nations League	2025	Wilfredo León	A	Best Outside Hitter	1st place, gold medalist(s)
(China) FIVB Nations League	2025	Kewin Sasak	A	Best Opposite Hitter	1st place, gold medalist(s)
(Philippines) FIVB World Championship	2025	Jakub Kochanowski	A	Best Middle Blocker	3rd place, bronze medalist(s)
(China) FIVB Nations League	2026	Tomasz Fornal	A	Most Valuable Player	1st place, gold medalist(s)
(Bulgaria) (Finland) (Italy) (Romania) CEV European Championship	2026	Wilfredo León	A	Best Outside Hitter; Most Valuable Player	1st place, gold medalist(s)
(Bulgaria) (Finland) (Italy) (Romania) CEV European Championship	2026	Bartłomiej Lemański	A	Best Middle Blocker	1st place, gold medalist(s)
(Bulgaria) (Finland) (Italy) (Romania) CEV European Championship	2026	Szymon Jakubiszak	A	Best Middle Blocker	1st place, gold medalist(s)
(Bulgaria) (Finland) (Italy) (Romania) CEV European Championship	2026	Jakub Popiwczak	A	Best Opposite Hitter	1st place, gold medalist(s)

== Friendly tournaments ==
Tournament	Year	Player		Category	Team result
(Poland) Memorial of Hubert Jerzy Wagner	2005	Michał Winiarski	A	Best Receiver	2nd place, silver medalist(s)
(Poland) Memorial of Hubert Jerzy Wagner	2005	Paweł Zagumny	A	Best Setter	2nd place, silver medalist(s)
(Poland) Memorial of Hubert Jerzy Wagner	2006	Sebastian Świderski	A	Most Valuable Player	1st place, gold medalist(s)
(Poland) Memorial of Hubert Jerzy Wagner	2007	Michał Winiarski	A	Best Receiver	3rd place, bronze medalist(s)
(Poland) Memorial of Hubert Jerzy Wagner	2007	Paweł Zagumny	A	Best Setter	3rd place, bronze medalist(s)
(Poland) Memorial of Hubert Jerzy Wagner	2008	Mariusz Wlazły	A	Best Spiker	1st place, gold medalist(s)
(Poland) Memorial of Hubert Jerzy Wagner	2008	Daniel Pliński	A	Best Blocker	1st place, gold medalist(s)
(Poland) Memorial of Hubert Jerzy Wagner	2008	Mariusz Wlazły	A	Best Server	1st place, gold medalist(s)
(Poland) Memorial of Hubert Jerzy Wagner	2008	Marcin Wika	A	Best Receiver	1st place, gold medalist(s)
(Poland) Memorial of Hubert Jerzy Wagner	2008	Paweł Woicki	A	Best Setter	1st place, gold medalist(s)
(Poland) Memorial of Hubert Jerzy Wagner	2008	Mariusz Wlazły	A	Most Valuable Player	1st place, gold medalist(s)
(Poland) Memorial of Hubert Jerzy Wagner	2009	Daniel Pliński	A	Best Blocker	1st place, gold medalist(s)
(Poland) Memorial of Hubert Jerzy Wagner	2009	Paweł Zagumny	A	Best Setter	1st place, gold medalist(s)
(Poland) Memorial of Hubert Jerzy Wagner	2009	Bartosz Kurek	A	Most Valuable Player	1st place, gold medalist(s)
(Poland) Memorial of Hubert Jerzy Wagner	2010	Piotr Nowakowski	A	Best Blocker	3rd place, bronze medalist(s)
(Poland) Memorial of Hubert Jerzy Wagner	2012	Zbigniew Bartman	A	Best Spiker	1st place, gold medalist(s)
(Poland) Memorial of Hubert Jerzy Wagner	2012	Łukasz Żygadło	A	Best Setter	1st place, gold medalist(s)
(Poland) Memorial of Hubert Jerzy Wagner	2012	Michał Winiarski	A	Best Receiver	1st place, gold medalist(s)
(Poland) Memorial of Hubert Jerzy Wagner	2012	Bartosz Kurek	A	Most Valuable Player	1st place, gold medalist(s)
(Poland) Memorial of Hubert Jerzy Wagner	2013	Marcin Możdżonek	A	Best Blocker	1st place, gold medalist(s)
(Poland) Memorial of Hubert Jerzy Wagner	2013	Paweł Zatorski	A	Best Libero	1st place, gold medalist(s)
(Poland) Memorial of Hubert Jerzy Wagner	2013	Michał Kubiak	A	Best Receiver	1st place, gold medalist(s)
(Poland) Memorial of Hubert Jerzy Wagner	2014	Piotr Nowakowski	A	Best Server	2nd place, silver medalist(s)
(Poland) Memorial of Hubert Jerzy Wagner	2014	Krzysztof Ignaczak	A	Best Libero	2nd place, silver medalist(s)
(Poland) Memorial of Hubert Jerzy Wagner	2015	Dawid Konarski	A	Best Opposite Spiker	1st place, gold medalist(s)
(Poland) Memorial of Hubert Jerzy Wagner	2015	Piotr Nowakowski	A	Best Blocker	1st place, gold medalist(s)
(Poland) Memorial of Hubert Jerzy Wagner	2015	Mateusz Bieniek	A	Best Server	1st place, gold medalist(s)
(Poland) Memorial of Hubert Jerzy Wagner	2015	Paweł Zatorski	A	Best Libero	1st place, gold medalist(s)
(Poland) Memorial of Hubert Jerzy Wagner	2015	Michał Kubiak	A	Most Valuable Player	1st place, gold medalist(s)
(Poland) Memorial of Hubert Jerzy Wagner	2016	Michał Kubiak	A	Best Outside Spiker	3rd place, bronze medalist(s)
(Poland) Memorial of Hubert Jerzy Wagner	2016	Bartosz Kurek	A	Best Opposite Spiker	3rd place, bronze medalist(s)
(Poland) Memorial of Hubert Jerzy Wagner	2017	Dawid Konarski	A	Best Opposite Spiker	1st place, gold medalist(s)
(Poland) Memorial of Hubert Jerzy Wagner	2017	Bartłomiej Lemański	A	Best Blocker	1st place, gold medalist(s)
(Poland) Memorial of Hubert Jerzy Wagner	2018	Artur Szalpuk	A	Most Valuable Player	1st place, gold medalist(s)
(Poland) Memorial of Hubert Jerzy Wagner	2018	Piotr Nowakowski	A	Best Server	1st place, gold medalist(s)
(Poland) Memorial of Hubert Jerzy Wagner	2018	Jakub Kochanowski	A	Best Blocker	1st place, gold medalist(s)
(Poland) Memorial of Hubert Jerzy Wagner	2019	Fabian Drzyzga	A	Best Setter	2nd place, silver medalist(s)
(Poland) Memorial of Hubert Jerzy Wagner	2019	Karol Kłos	A	Best Blocker	2nd place, silver medalist(s)
(Poland) Memorial of Hubert Jerzy Wagner	2019	Dawid Konarski	A	Best Opposite Spiker	2nd place, silver medalist(s)
(Poland) Memorial of Hubert Jerzy Wagner	2021	Wilfredo León	A	Most Valuable Player	1st place, gold medalist(s)
(Poland) Memorial of Hubert Jerzy Wagner	2021	Fabian Drzyzga	A	Best Setter	1st place, gold medalist(s)
(Poland) Memorial of Hubert Jerzy Wagner	2021	Mateusz Bieniek	A	Best Server	1st place, gold medalist(s)
(Poland) Memorial of Hubert Jerzy Wagner	2021	Piotr Nowakowski	A	Best Blocker	1st place, gold medalist(s)
(Poland) Memorial of Hubert Jerzy Wagner	2021	Bartosz Kurek	A	Best Opposite Spiker	1st place, gold medalist(s)
(Poland) Memorial of Hubert Jerzy Wagner	2021	Paweł Zatorski	A	Best Libero	1st place, gold medalist(s)
(Poland) Memorial of Hubert Jerzy Wagner	2022	Jakub Kochanowski	A	Most Valuable Player	1st place, gold medalist(s)
(Poland) Memorial of Hubert Jerzy Wagner	2022	Marcin Janusz	A	Best Setter	1st place, gold medalist(s)
(Poland) Memorial of Hubert Jerzy Wagner	2022	Jakub Kochanowski	A	Best Blocker	1st place, gold medalist(s)
(Poland) Memorial of Hubert Jerzy Wagner	2022	Kamil Semeniuk	A	Best Receiver	1st place, gold medalist(s)
(Poland) Memorial of Hubert Jerzy Wagner	2023	Paweł Zatorski	A	Best Libero	3rd place, bronze medalist(s)
(Poland) Memorial of Hubert Jerzy Wagner	2024	Kamil Semeniuk	A	Most Valuable Player	1st place, gold medalist(s)
(Poland) Memorial of Hubert Jerzy Wagner	2024	Tomasz Fornal	A	Best Receiver	1st place, gold medalist(s)
(Poland) Memorial of Hubert Jerzy Wagner	2024	Jakub Kochanowski	A	Best Blocker	1st place, gold medalist(s)
(Poland) Memorial of Hubert Jerzy Wagner	2025	Bartosz Kurek	A	Best Opposite Spiker	3rd place, bronze medalist(s)
(Poland) Memorial of Hubert Jerzy Wagner	2026	Bartłomiej Bołądź	A	Most Valuable Player; Best Opposite Spiker	1st place, gold medalist(s)
(Poland) Memorial of Hubert Jerzy Wagner	2026	Jakub Majchrzak	A	Best Blocker	1st place, gold medalist(s)

== See also ==
- Poland men's national volleyball team
