= Marcin Możdżonek =

Polish volleyball player (born 1985)

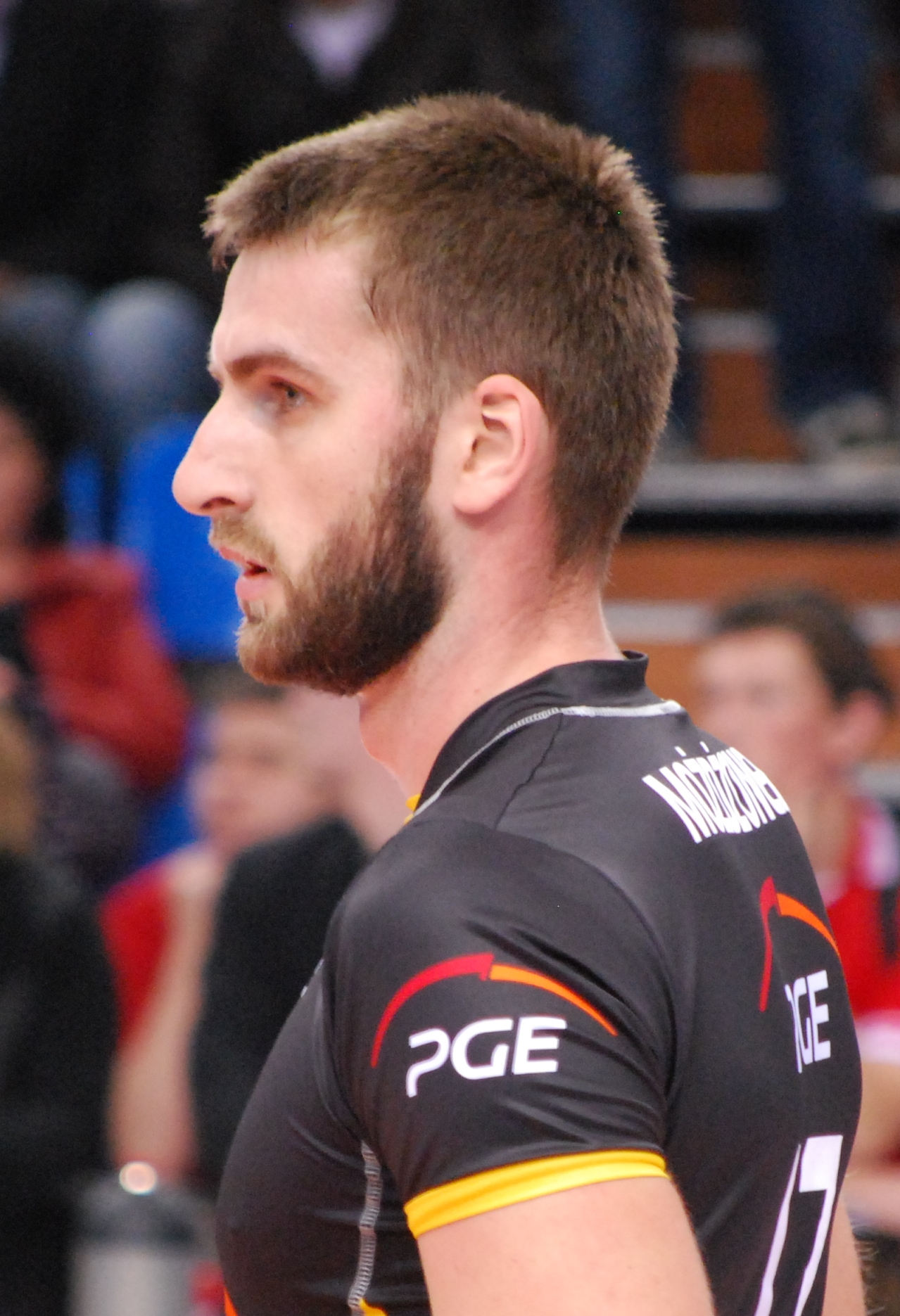
- Możdżonek in 2010

Personal information
- Full name: Marcin Rafał Możdżonek
- Nickname: Możdżon
- Nationality: Polish
- Born: 9 February 1985 (age 41); Olsztyn, Poland
- Height: 2.11 m (6 ft 11 in)

Volleyball information
- Position: Middle blocker

Career
| Years | Teams |
|---|---|
| 2004–2008; 2008–2012; 2012–2014; 2014–2015; 2015–2016; 2016–2020 | AZS Olsztyn; Skra Bełchatów; ZAKSA Kędzierzyn-Koźle; Halkbank Ankara; Cuprum Lubin; Asseco Resovia |

National team
| 2007–2016 | Poland (242) |
Honours
Men's volleyball
Representing Poland
FIVB World Championship
| Gold medal – first place | 2014 Poland |
FIVB World Cup
| Silver medal – second place | 2011 Japan |
| Bronze medal – third place | 2015 Japan |
FIVB World League
| Gold medal – first place | 2012 Sofia |
| Bronze medal – third place | 2011 Gdańsk |
CEV European Championship
| Gold medal – first place | 2009 Turkey |
| Bronze medal – third place | 2011 Austria/Czech Republic |

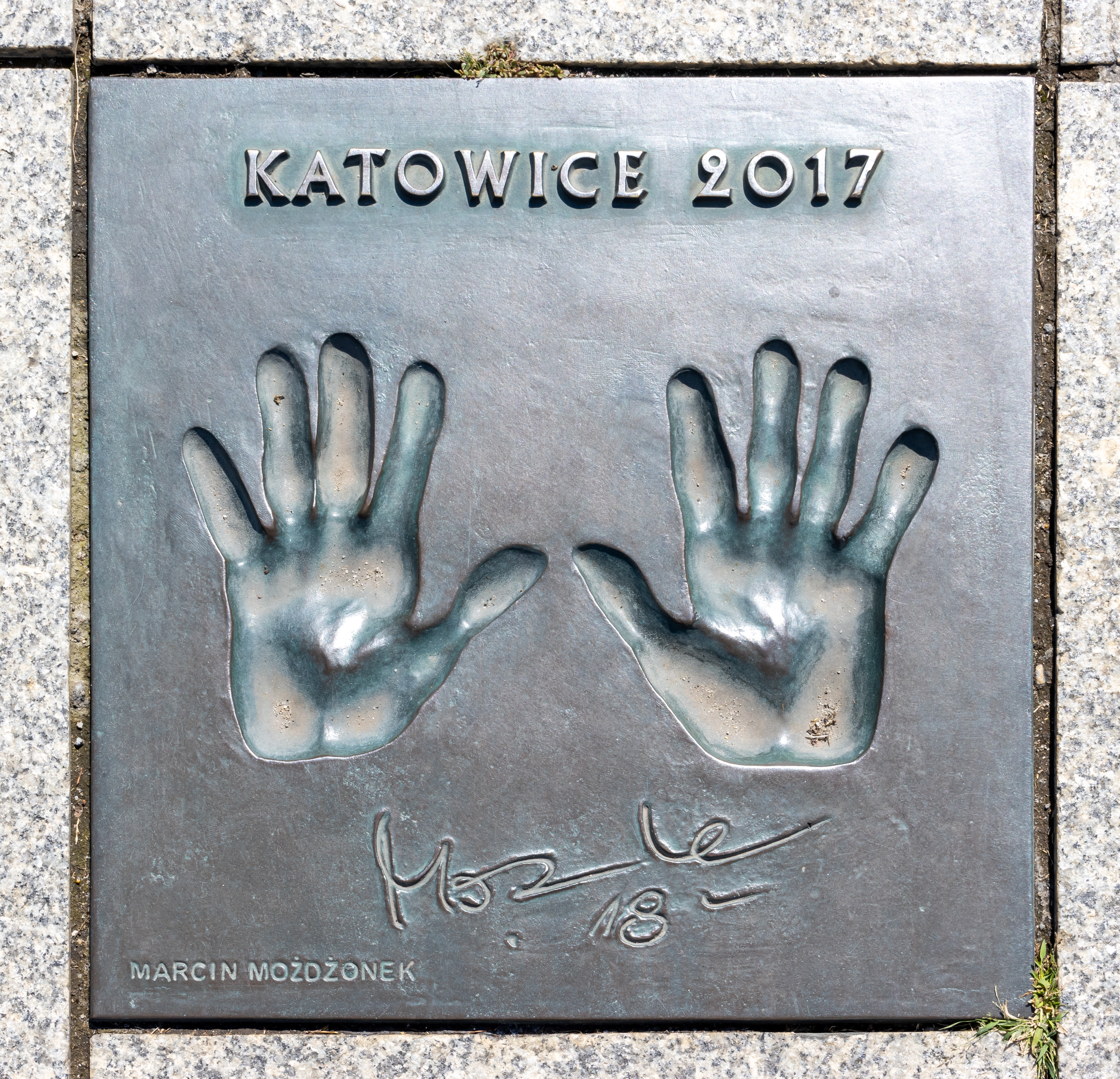
Hand prints and signature at the Avenue of Volleyball Stars, Katowice

Marcin Rafał Możdżonek (born 9 February 1985) is a Polish former professional volleyball player, a member of the Poland national team in 2007–2016, a participant in the Olympic Games (Beijing 2008, London 2012), the 2014 World Champion, 2009 European Champion, and the 2012 World League winner.

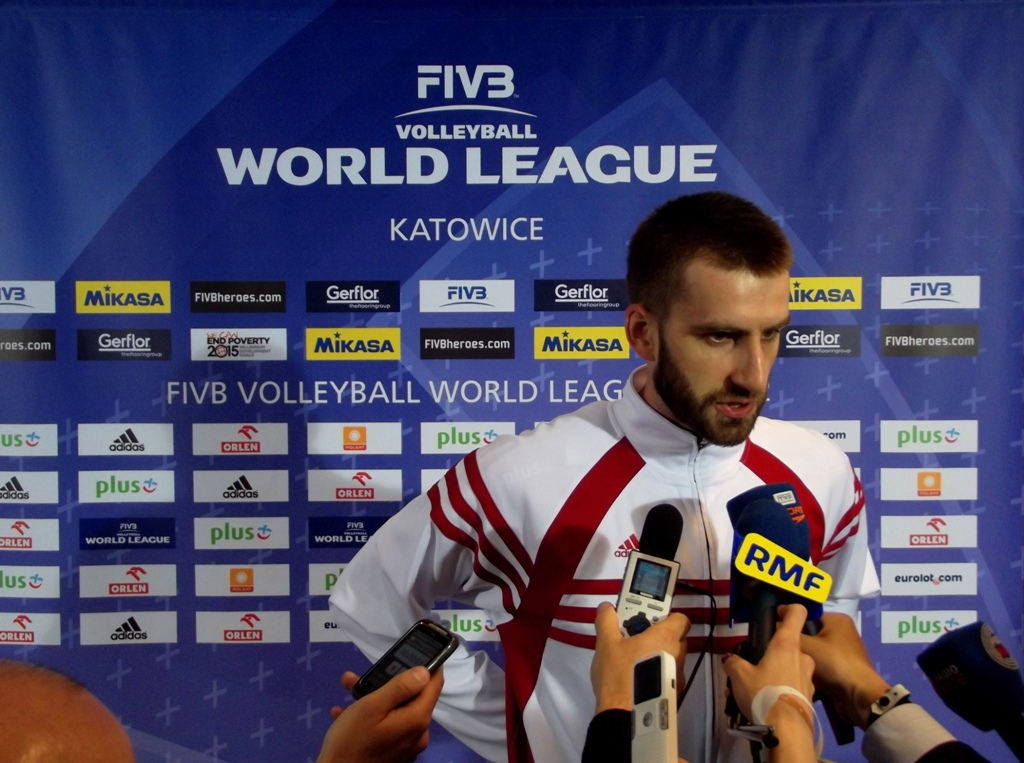
Marcin Możdżonek after match Poland-USA at Spodek in Katowice (World League 2012).

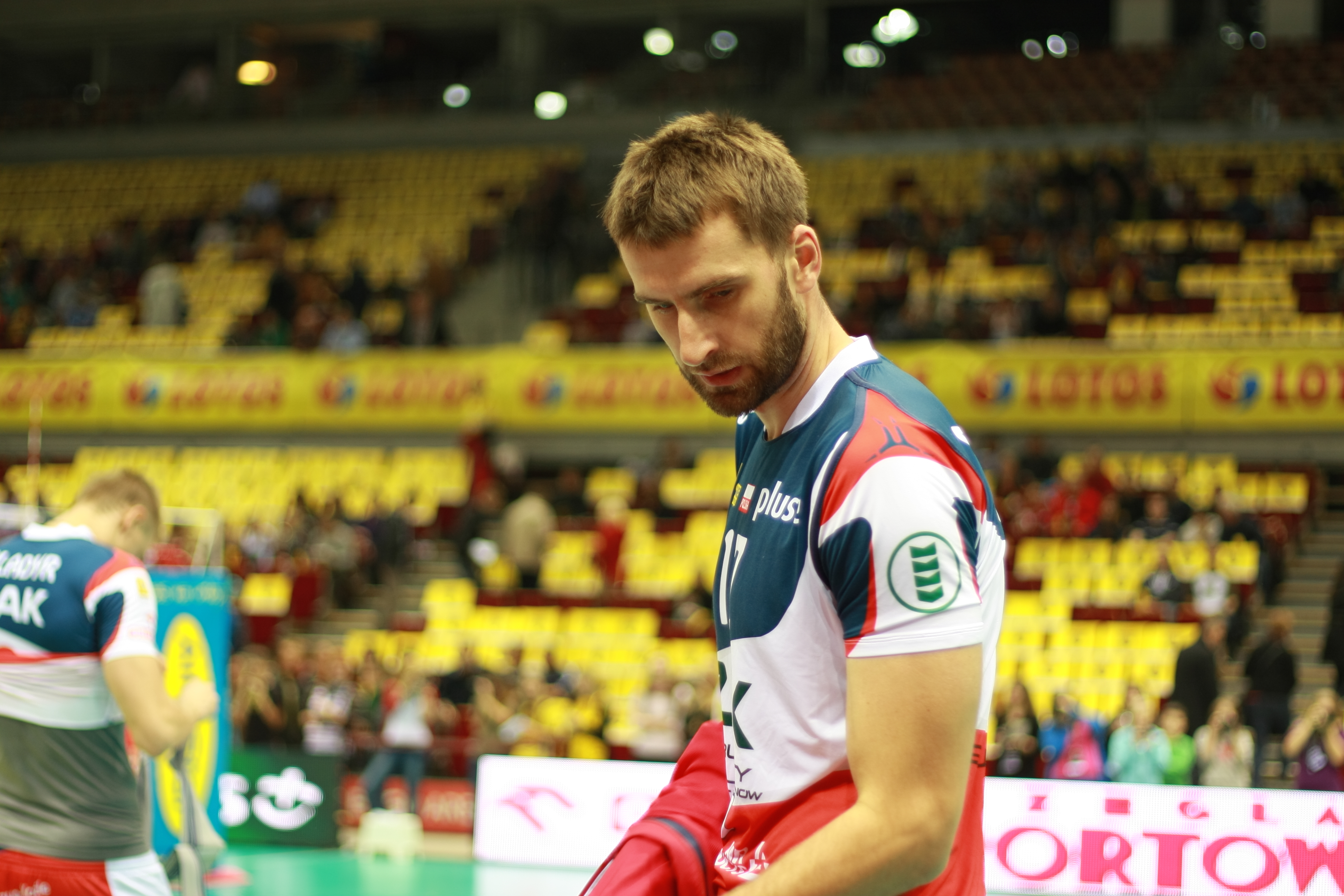
Możdżonek as player of ZAKSA Kędzierzyn-Koźle in 2012.

== Career ==
=== Club ===
In 2012–2014 Możdżonek played for ZAKSA Kędzierzyn-Koźle. With this club he won the Polish Cup twice (2013–2014) and won the silver medal in the Polish Championship 2012/2013. In October 2014, he moved to Turkish club Halkbank Ankara. On March 29, 2015, he achieved his first trophy with his new club Halkbank Ankara – the Turkish Cup. In the finals, his team beat Arkas Izmir 3-0 and he scored 10 points. In July 2015, he came back to Poland and he signed a contract with MKS Cuprum Lubin.

=== National team ===
He debuted in the Polish national team in 2007 (during the Poland-Argentina match). Możdżonek was in the Polish squad when the Polish national team won the gold medal at the European Championship 2009. On September 14, 2009, he was awarded The Order of Polonia Restituta. The Order was conferred on the following day by the Prime Minister of Poland, Donald Tusk. With the Polish team, he won three medals in 2011 - silver at World Cup and two bronzes at World League and European Championship. In November 2011, he was declared the new captain of national team. He is a gold medalist of World League 2012 in Sofia, Bulgaria. In May 2014, he was replaced as captain by Michał Winiarski. On September 21, 2014, Poland won the title of World Champion 2014. On October 27, 2014, he received a state award granted by the Polish President, Bronisław Komorowski: the Officer's Cross of Polonia Restituta for outstanding sports achievements and worldwide promotion of Poland.

He was not called to the national team by Stephane Antiga for the 2016 Olympic Games in Rio de Janeiro.

== Honours ==
=== Club ===
- CEV Champions League
  - 2011/2012 – with PGE Skra Bełchatów
- FIVB Club World Championship
  - Doha 2009 – with PGE Skra Bełchatów
  - Doha 2010 – with PGE Skra Bełchatów
- Domestic
  - 2008–09 Polish Cup, with PGE Skra Bełchatów
  - 2008–09 Polish Championship, with PGE Skra Bełchatów
  - 2009–10 Polish Championship, with PGE Skra Bełchatów
  - 2010–11 Polish Cup, with PGE Skra Bełchatów
  - 2010–11 Polish Championship, with PGE Skra Bełchatów
  - 2011–12 Polish Cup, with PGE Skra Bełchatów
  - 2012–13 Polish Cup, with ZAKSA Kędzierzyn-Koźle
  - 2013–14 Polish Cup, with ZAKSA Kędzierzyn-Koźle
  - 2014–15 Turkish Cup, with Halkbank Ankara

=== Youth national team ===
- 2003 European Youth Olympic Festival
- 2003 FIVB U21 World Championship

=== Individual awards ===
- 2009: FIVB Club World Championship – Best blocker
- 2011: FIVB World Cup – Best blocker
- 2012: Polish Cup – Best blocker
- 2012: FIVB World League – Best blocker

=== State awards ===
- 2009: Knight's Cross of Polonia Restituta
- 2014: Officer's Cross of Polonia Restituta

Awards
| Preceded by – | Best Blocker of FIVB Club World Championship; 2009 | Succeeded by (Iran) Mohammad Mousavi |
| Preceded by (Spain) José Luis Moltó | Best Blocker of FIVB World Cup; 2011 | Succeeded by (Argentina) Sebastian Sole (Iran) Mohammad Mousavi |
| Preceded by (Russia) Maksim Mikhaylov | Best Blocker of FIVB World League; 2012 | Succeeded by (Russia) Dmitriy Muserskiy (Italy) Emanuele Birarelli |
