= Michał Ruciak =

Polish volleyball player (born 1983)

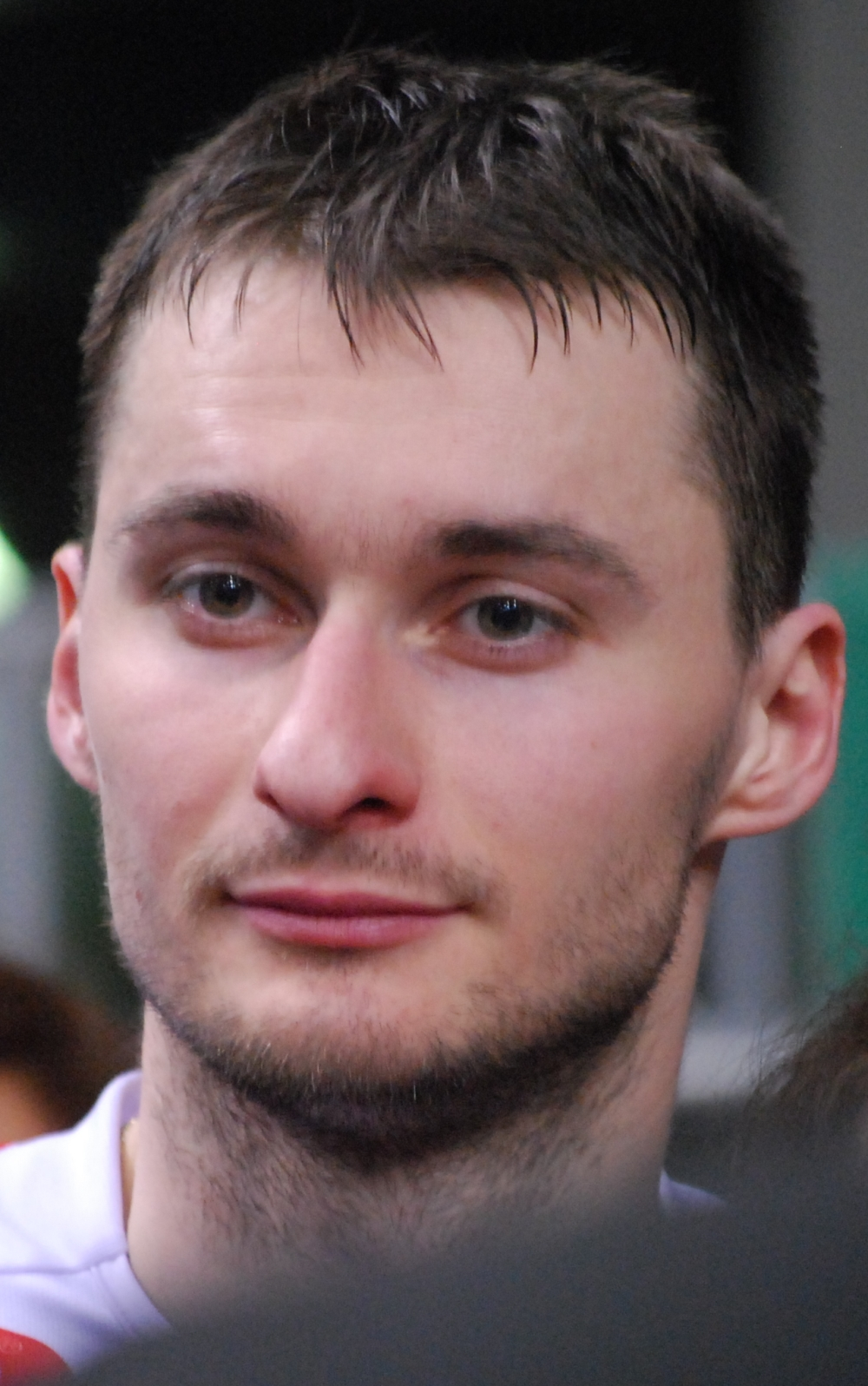
- Ruciak in 2010

Personal information
- Full name: Michał Zygmunt Ruciak
- Nickname: Rucek
- Born: 22 August 1983 (age 43); Świnoujście, Poland
- Height: 1.90 m (6 ft 3 in)

Volleyball information
- Position: Outside hitter

Career
Years	Teams
2002–2003; 2003–2004; 2004–2008; 2008–2015; 2015–2016; 2016–2018; 2018–2020; 2020–2022	Morze Bałtyk Szczecin; Skra Bełchatów; AZS Olsztyn; ZAKSA Kędzierzyn-Koźle; Transfer Bydgoszcz; Espadon Szczecin; Czarni Radom; Stal Nysa

National team
2004–2014	Poland (166)
Honours
Men's volleyball
Representing Poland
FIVB World Cup
Silver medal – second place	2011 Japan
FIVB World League
Gold medal – first place	2012 Sofia
Bronze medal – third place	2011 Gdańsk
CEV European Championship
Gold medal – first place	2009 Turkey
Bronze medal – third place	2011 Austria/Czech Republic

Michał Zygmunt Ruciak (born 22 August 1983) is a Polish former professional volleyball player. He was a member of the Poland national team from 2004 to 2014, a participant in the Olympic Games London 2012, the 2009 European Champion and the 2012 World League winner.

== Personal life ==
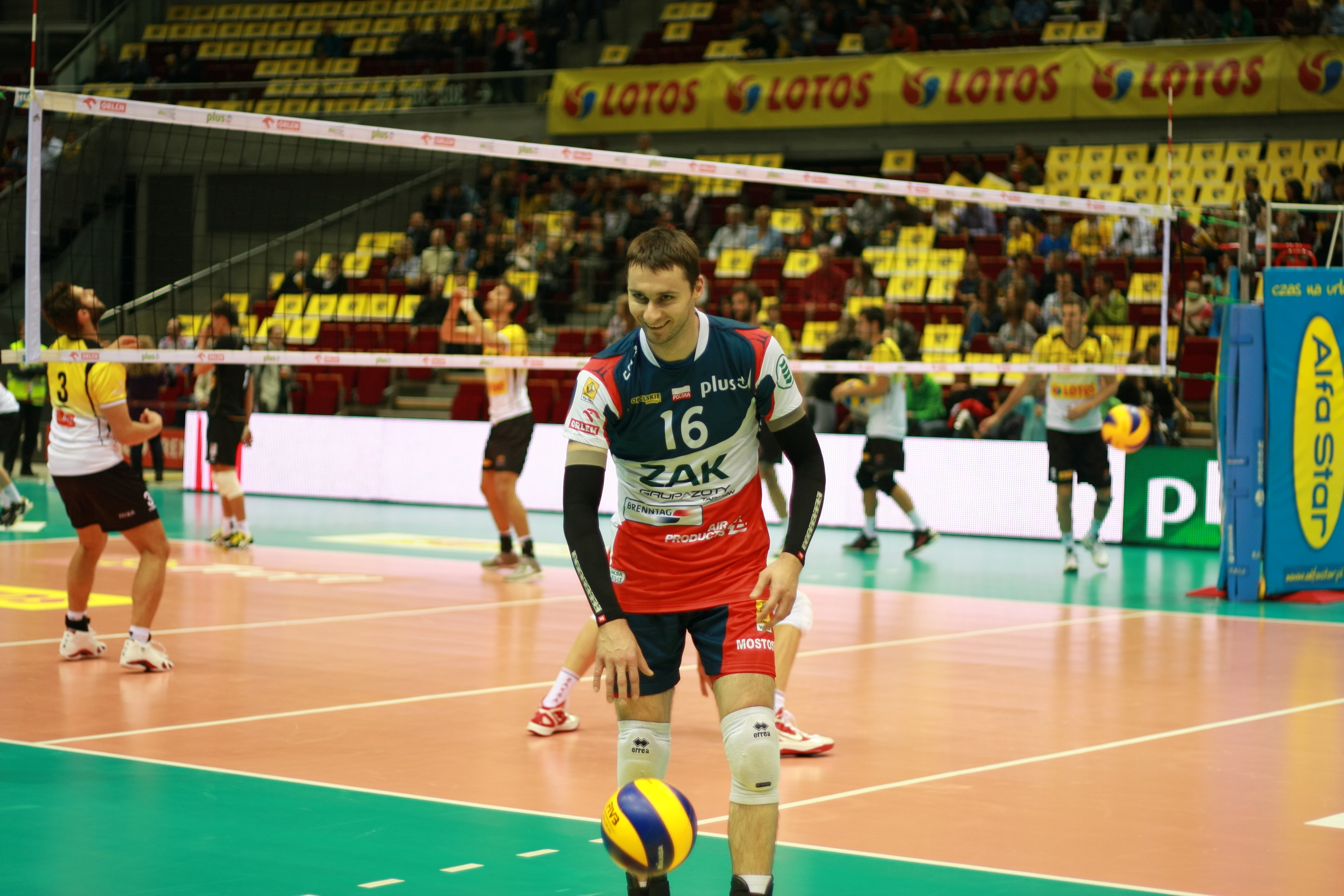
Ruciak during the match with Trefl Gdańsk on 14 October 2012.

Ruciak was born in Świnoujście, Poland. On 22 September 2007, he married Justyna (née Terlecka). They have two sons: Rafał (born on 2 June 2008) and Filip (born on 18 March 2011). In 2014, they split up. In 2016, he married Paulina. In April 2018, they revealed they are expecting their first child.

== Career ==
=== Club ===
He began to play with Maraton Świnoujście, later moving to Morze Szczecin, Skra Bełchatów and AZS Olsztyn. In 2008 moved to ZAKSA Kędzierzyn-Koźle. After 7 seasons in ZAKSA Kędzierzyn-Koźle, he left this club in April 2015.

=== National team ===
Michał Ruciak was in the Polish squad when the Polish national team won the gold medal of European Championship 2009. On September 14, 2009 he was awarded Knight's Cross of Polonia Restituta. The Order was conferred on the following day by the Prime Minister of Poland, Donald Tusk. He won with Polish team three medals in 2011 - silver at World Cup and two bronzes at World League and European Championship. He is a gold medalist of World League 2012 in Sofia, Bulgaria.

== Honours ==
=== Club ===
- CEV Cup
  - 2010–11 – with ZAKSA Kędzierzyn-Koźle
- Domestic
  - 2004–05 Polish Championship, with AZS Olsztyn
  - 2010–11 Polish Championship, with ZAKSA Kędzierzyn-Koźle
  - 2012–13 Polish Cup, with ZAKSA Kędzierzyn-Koźle
  - 2012–13 Polish Championship, with ZAKSA Kędzierzyn-Koźle
  - 2013–14 Polish Cup, with ZAKSA Kędzierzyn-Koźle

=== Youth national team ===
- 2003 FIVB U21 World Championship

=== Individual awards ===
- 2013: Polish Cup – Best server
- 2014: Polish Cup – Best receiver

=== State awards ===
- 2009: Knight's Cross of Polonia Restituta

=== Statistics ===
- 2008–09 PlusLiga – Best receiver
- 2011–12 PlusLiga – Best receiver
- 2017–18 PlusLiga – Best receiver
