= Michał Kubiak =

Polish volleyball player (born 1988)

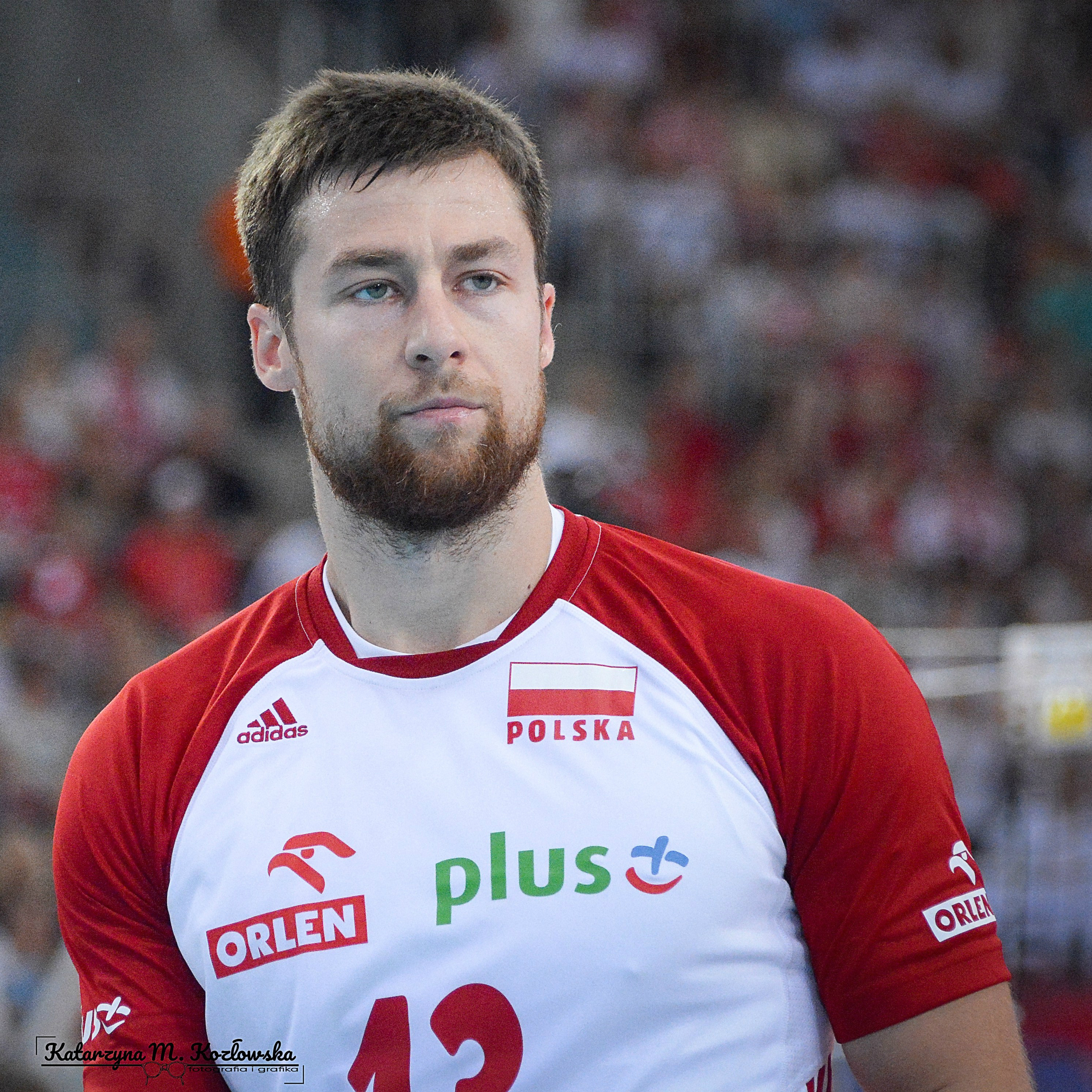

Personal information
- Full name: Michał Jarosław Kubiak
- Nickname: Misiek; Kubi
- Born: 23 February 1988 (age 38); Wałcz, Poland
- Height: 1.92 m (6 ft 4 in)
- Weight: 87 kg (192 lb)
- Spike: 347 cm (137 in)
- Block: 310 cm (122 in)

Volleyball information
- Position: Outside hitter
- Current club: Shanghai Bright

Career
Years	Teams
2002–2005; 2005–2006; 2006–2007; 2007–2008; 2008–2009; 2009–2010; 2010–2011; 2011–2014; 2014–2016; 2016–2023; 2018–2019; 2023–2025; 2025–	Maraton Świnoujście; Joker Piła; AZS Olsztyn; KS Poznań; Hapoel Kiryat Ata; Pallavolo Padova; AZS Politechnika Warszawska; Jastrzębski Węgiel; Halkbank Ankara; Panasonic Panthers; Beijing Volleyball; Shanghai Bright; Ho Chi Minh City Police

National team
2011–2021	Poland (172)
Honours
Men's volleyball
Representing Poland
FIVB World Championship
Gold medal – first place	2014 Poland
Gold medal – first place	2018 Bulgaria/Italy
FIVB World Cup
Silver medal – second place	2011 Japan
Silver medal – second place	2019 Japan
Bronze medal – third place	2015 Japan
FIVB World League
Gold medal – first place	2012 Sofia
Bronze medal – third place	2011 Gdańsk
FIVB Nations League
Silver medal – second place	2021 Rimini
CEV European Championship
Bronze medal – third place	2011 Austria/Czech Republic
Bronze medal – third place	2019 Belgium/France/Netherlands/Slovenia
Bronze medal – third place	2021 Poland/Czechia/Estonia/Finland

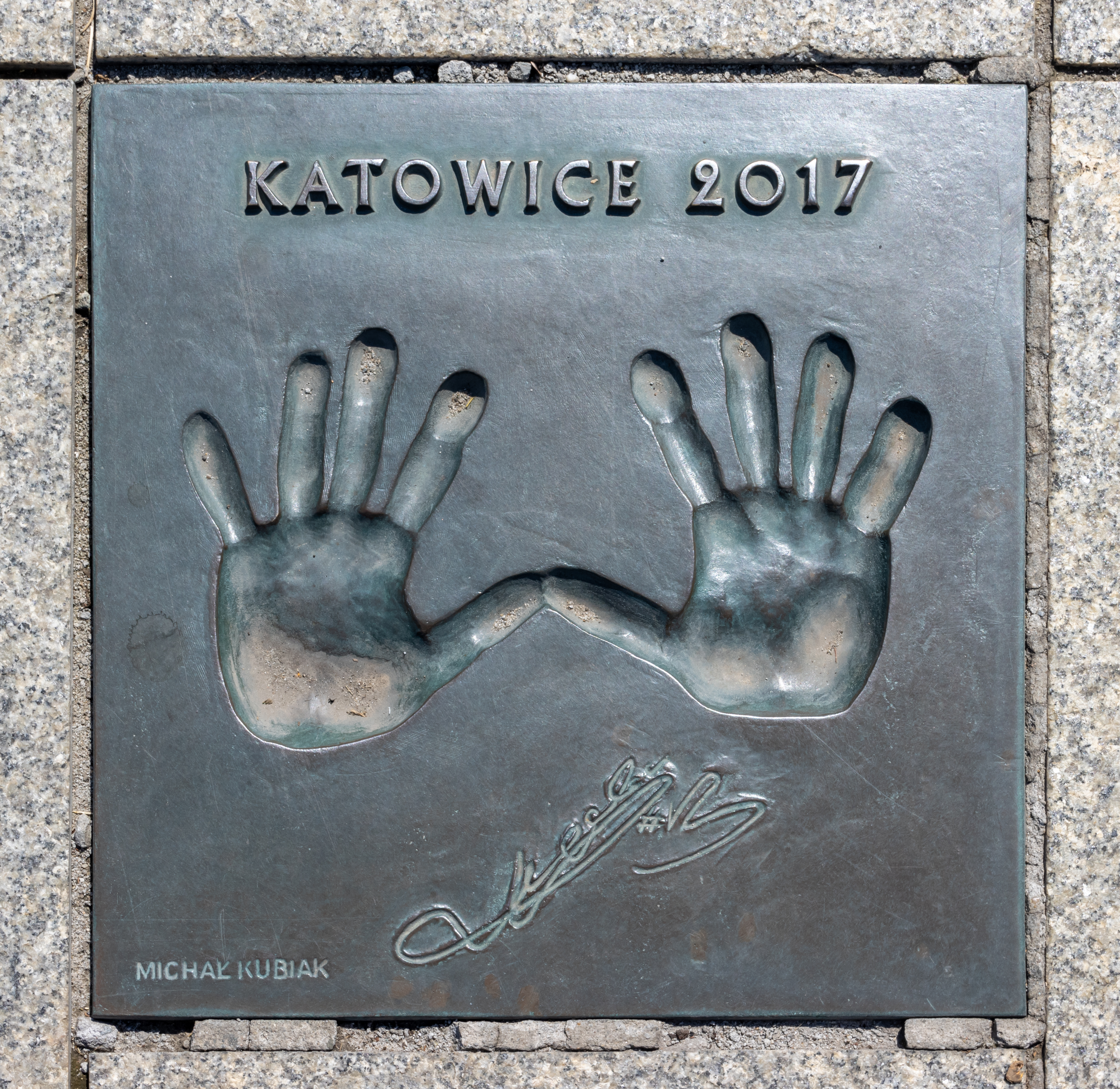
Hand prints and signature at the Avenue of Volleyball Stars, Katowice

Michał Jarosław Kubiak (born 23 February 1988) is a Polish professional volleyball player who plays as an outside hitter for Shanghai Bright. He is a former member of the Poland national team, a participant in the Olympic Games (London 2012, Rio 2016, Tokyo 2020), two–time World Champion (2014, 2018), and the 2012 World League winner.

== Personal life ==
Michał Kubiak was born in Wałcz, Poland. He has an older brother Błażej, who is also a volleyball player. He is married to Monika. On 23 February 2014 (Kubiak's 26th birthday) their daughter Pola was born. They also have a second child.

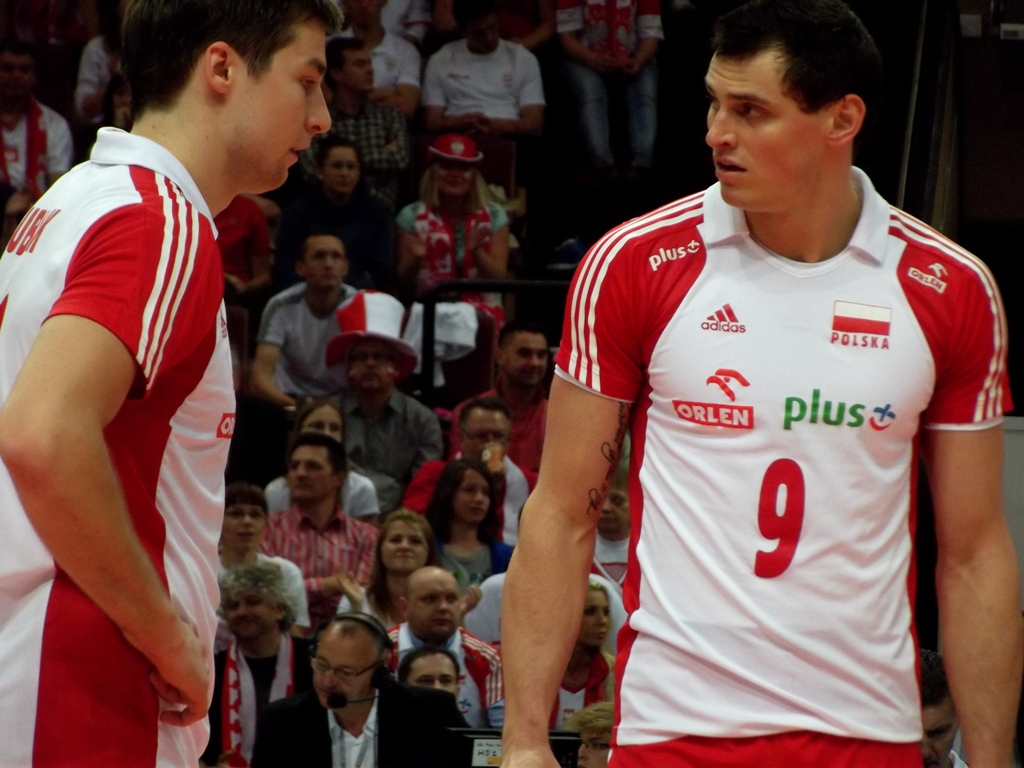
Michał Kubiak and Zbigniew Bartman during the match at Spodek, Katowice (2012 World League).

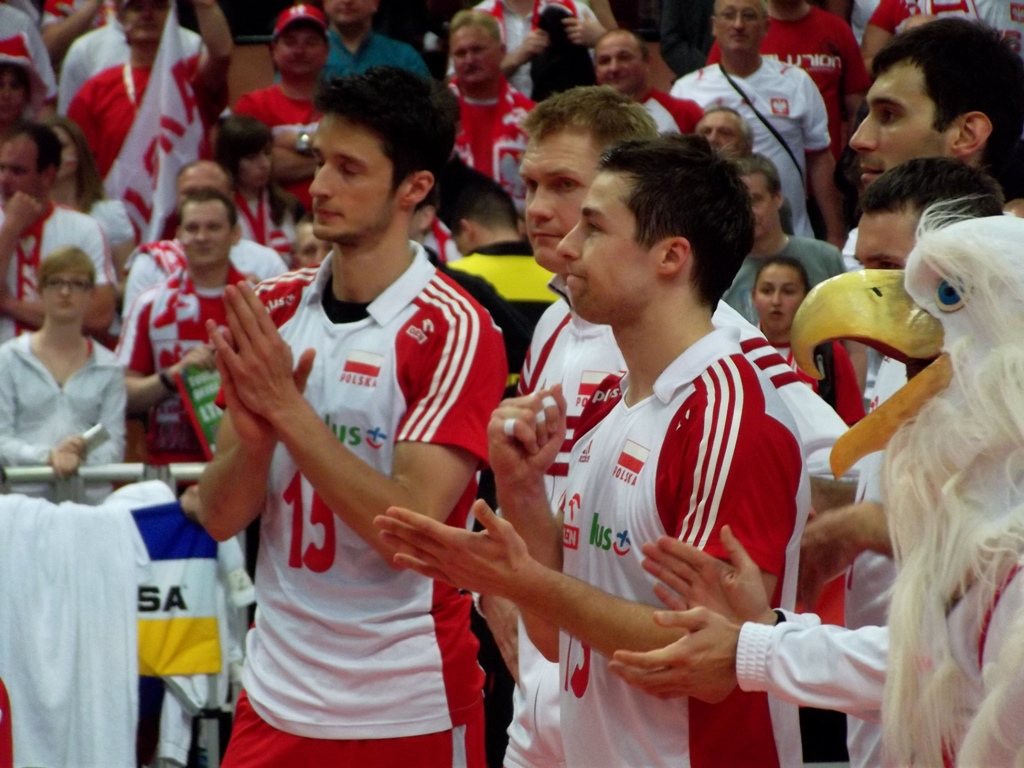
Kubiak, Łukasz Żygadło and Paweł Zagumny during the match Poland – USA (2012 World League).

== Career ==
Before his career as an indoor volleyball player, Michał Kubiak played beach volleyball with Zbigniew Bartman. They won a gold medal at the European U18 Championship in 2004 and a silver medal at the World U18 Championship, also in 2004. Both Kubiak and Bartman gave up playing beach volleyball.

=== Club ===
Kubiak made his debut in the Polish volleyball league during the 2005/2006 season, and He played for three Polish clubs before moving to foreign leagues. In the 2008/2009 season, he played for Israeli club Hapoel Kiryat Ata. His career accelerated after good performances in the B squad of the Polish national team. After that he moved to Italian Serie A2 Volley Padwa. In the 2010/2011 season, he returned to the PlusLiga, specifically to AZS Politechnika Warszawska, where he played with Zbigniew Bartman again. He wanted to leave the Warsaw club in 2011, but the club stated that their contract was still valid and filed a lawsuit. Finally, Kubiak moved to Jastrzębski Węgiel. With this club, he won a silver medal in the World Club Championship 2011. In 2012/2013 season he won a bronze medal in the Polish Championships. In 2013/2014 the club advanced to the Final Four of the Champions League in Ankara and after defeating Zenit Kazan won the bronze medal. His team beat ZAKSA Kędzierzyn-Koźle in the last matches in the fight for a medal. Jastrzębski Węgiel, including Kubiak, ended the season with a second bronze in the Polish Championships. In July 2014, a year before his contract was due to end, Kubiak requested an early termination. The club agreed, and Kubiak was able to play for the Turkish club Halkbank Ankara for the season 2014/2015. Kubiak agreed with Jastrzębski Węgiel that after the end of the contract in Turkey, he would return to the Polish club. On 29 March 2015 he won the Turkish Cup with his team Halkbank Ankara. In the final match, his team beat Arkas Izmir 3-0 and Kubiak scored 11 points. After one season in Japan with the Panasonic Panthers, he renewed his contract until the end of the 2018/2019 season.

Michal Kubiak left Panasonic Panthers after 2022/23 season. He spent a total of 7 years with the team. Panasonic Panthers praised him that he not only played at a world-class level but also brought a great attitude towards games and practices that inspired the team.

=== National team ===
Kubiak was first selected to represent the Polish national team by coach Andrea Anastasi in 2011. With the Polish team, he won three medals in 2011 - silver at the World Cup and two bronzes at the World League and the European Championship. He was a gold medalist at the World League 2012 in Sofia, Bulgaria. On 16 August 2014 he was selected to the Polish squad at the World Championship held in Poland. On 21 September 2014 Poland won the title of World Champion 2014. On 27 October 2014 he received a state award granted by the Polish President Bronisław Komorowski, the Gold Cross of Merit for outstanding sports achievements and worldwide promotion of Poland.

In November 2015 he was nominated for Polish Sports Personality of the Year by the Plebiscite of Przegląd Sportowy. He took 5th place in the list of 2015 Polish Sports Personality of the Year.

On 30 September 2018 Poland achieved title of the 2018 World Champion. Poland beat Brazil in the final 3-0 and defended the title from 2014. Kubiak received an individual award for the Best Outside Spiker and he was one of the main players in the team.

== Controversies ==
In 2019, he made a comment against the Iranian people that led to his suspension by FIVB for six games. He said referring to the people of Iran: "The Iranians think they are great and the best and we are the worst. But I believe that they are fatal, malicious and damned people. For me, this nation doesn't exist, even though they proudly call themselves Persians, not Arabs. Sometimes we have to play with them, but for me, they don't exist." In response, Iran national volleyball team head coach, Igor Kolakovic addressed Kubiak in an Instagram post: "Dear Michal Kubiak, you are the great volleyball player, but you have the right to make a mistake. Come to Iran, please, to see how wonderful people live here."

== Honours ==
=== Club ===
- FIVB Club World Championship
  - Doha 2011 – with Jastrzębski Węgiel
- AVC Asian Club Championship
  - Taipei 2019 – with Panasonic Panthers
- Domestic
  - 2014–15 Turkish SuperCup, with Halkbank Ankara
  - 2014–15 Turkish Cup, with Halkbank Ankara
  - 2015–16 Turkish SuperCup, with Halkbank Ankara
  - 2015–16 Turkish Championship, with Halkbank Ankara
  - 2017–18 Emperor's Cup, with Panasonic Panthers
  - 2017–18 Japanese Championship, with Panasonic Panthers
  - 2018–19 Japanese Championship, with Panasonic Panthers

=== Youth national team ===
- Beach volleyball
  - 2004 CEV U18 European Championship, with Zbigniew Bartman
  - 2004 FIVB U19 World Championship, with Zbigniew Bartman

=== Individual awards ===
- 2014: Polish Cup – Best opposite spiker
- 2015: FIVB World League – Best outside spiker
- 2016: Turkish Championship – Most valuable player
- 2018: Japanese Championship – Most valuable player
- 2018: FIVB World Championship – Best outside spiker
- 2019: Japanese Championship – Most valuable player
- 2019: AVC Asian Club Championship – Best outside spiker
- 2021: FIVB Nations League – Best outside spiker

=== State awards ===
- 2014: Gold Cross of Merit
- 2018: Knight's Cross of Polonia Restituta

=== Statistics ===
- 2010–11 PlusLiga – Best server (49 aces)

Awards
Preceded by (Cuba) Wilfredo León (Bulgaria) Todor Aleksiev	Best Outside Spiker of FIVB Club World Championship; 2016 ex aequo (Cuba) Wilfredo León	Succeeded by (Cuba) Wilfredo León (Brazil) Yoandy Leal
Preceded by (Poland) Bartosz Bednorz (Russia) Dmitry Volkov (Russia) Egor Kliuka	Best Outside Spiker of FIVB Nations League; Rimini 2021 (with (Brazil) Yoandy Leal)	Succeeded by (France) Trévor Clévenot (France) Earvin N'Gapeth
