= Łukasz Wiśniewski =

Polish volleyball player (born 1989)

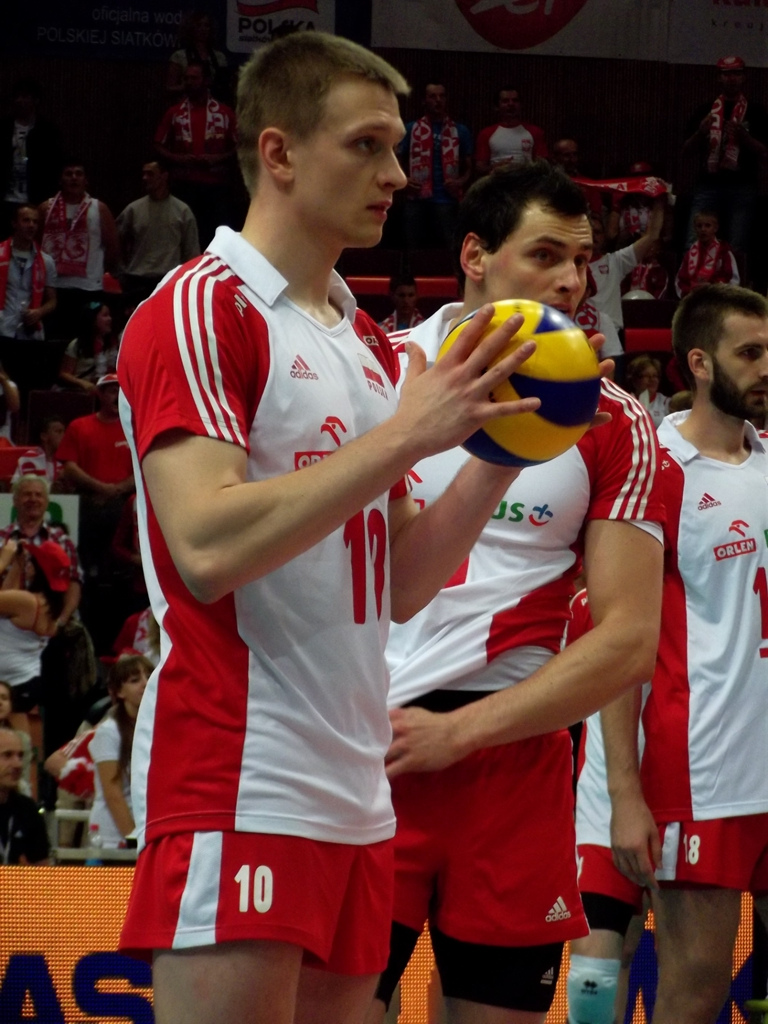
- Wiśniewski in 2012

Personal information
- Nickname: Wiśnia
- Born: 3 February 1989 (age 37) Włodawa, Poland
- Height: 1.98 m (6 ft 6 in)
- Weight: 100 kg (220 lb)
- Spike: 356 cm (140 in)
- Block: 335 cm (132 in)

Volleyball information
- Position: Middle blocker
- Current club: Skra Bełchatów
- Number: 9

Career
- Years: Team
- 2008–2012 2012–2020 2020–2023 2023–: AZS Częstochowa; ZAKSA Kędzierzyn-Koźle; Jastrzębski Węgiel; Skra Bełchatów

National team
- Years: Team
- 2010–2017: Poland (49)
Honours
Men's volleyball
Representing Poland
FIVB World Cup
Silver medal – second place	2011 Japan
FIVB World League
Gold medal – first place	2012 Sofia

Łukasz Wiśniewski (born 3 February 1989) is a Polish professional volleyball player who plays as a middle blocker for Skra Bełchatów. He is a former member of the Poland national team.

== Personal life ==
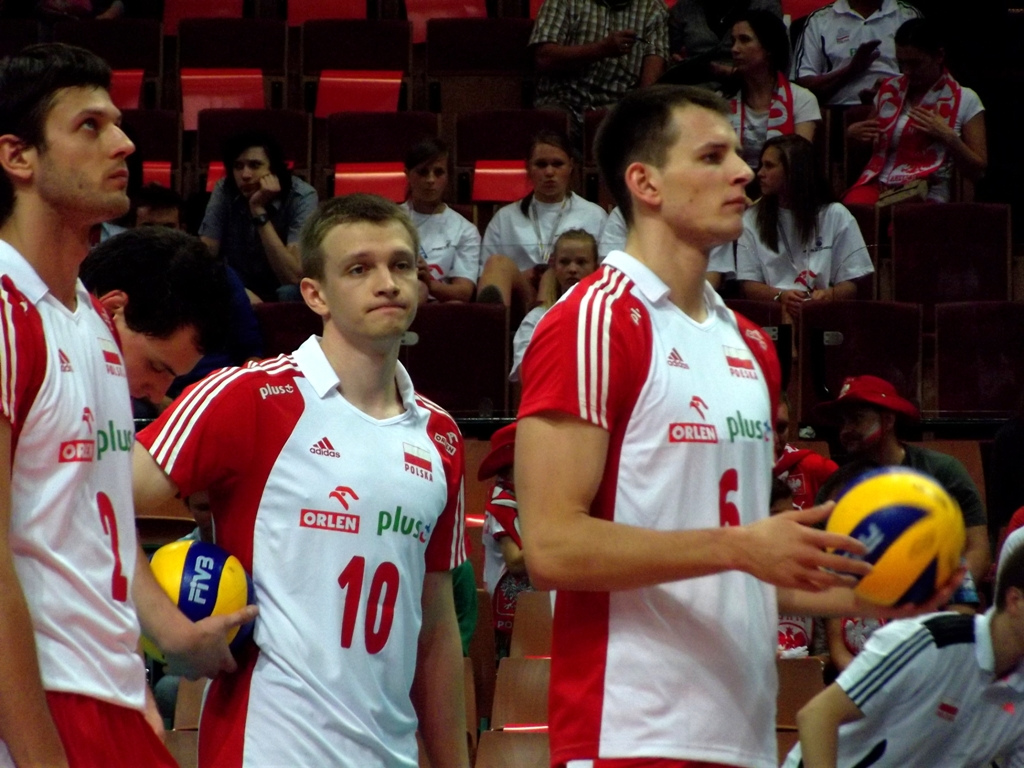
Wiśniewski with Michał Winiarski #2 and Bartosz Kurek #6 at the 2012 World League

Wiśniewski was born in Włodawa. His mother trained handball and his father is a former footballer. On 10 May 2014, Wiśniewski married Katarzyna (née Łuszczewska). On 2 January 2017, his wife gave birth to their daughter Aleksandra.

== Career ==
=== National team ===
Wiśniewski made his debut in the Poland national team on 30 May 2010 in a friendly match against France. In December 2011, Poland, including Wiśniewski, won a silver medal at the World Cup. He is also a gold medallist at the 2012 World League.

== Honours ==
=== Club ===
- CEV Champions League
  - 2022–23 – with Jastrzębski Węgiel
- CEV Challenge Cup
  - 2011–12 – with AZS Częstochowa
- Domestic
  - 2012–13 Polish Cup, with ZAKSA Kędzierzyn-Koźle
  - 2013–14 Polish Cup, with ZAKSA Kędzierzyn-Koźle
  - 2015–16 Polish Championship, with ZAKSA Kędzierzyn-Koźle
  - 2016–17 Polish Cup, with ZAKSA Kędzierzyn-Koźle
  - 2016–17 Polish Championship, with ZAKSA Kędzierzyn-Koźle
  - 2018–19 Polish Cup, with ZAKSA Kędzierzyn-Koźle
  - 2018–19 Polish Championship, with ZAKSA Kędzierzyn-Koźle
  - 2019–20 Polish SuperCup, with ZAKSA Kędzierzyn-Koźle
  - 2020–21 Polish Championship, with Jastrzębski Węgiel
  - 2021–22 Polish SuperCup, with Jastrzębski Węgiel
  - 2022–23 Polish SuperCup, with Jastrzębski Węgiel
  - 2022–23 Polish Championship, with Jastrzębski Węgiel

=== Individual awards ===
- 2013: Polish Cup – Best blocker
- 2014: Polish Cup – Best blocker
- 2016: Polish Cup – Best server
- 2017: Polish Cup – Best blocker
- 2019: Polish Cup – Best blocker
