= Zbigniew Bartman =

Polish volleyball player (born 1987)

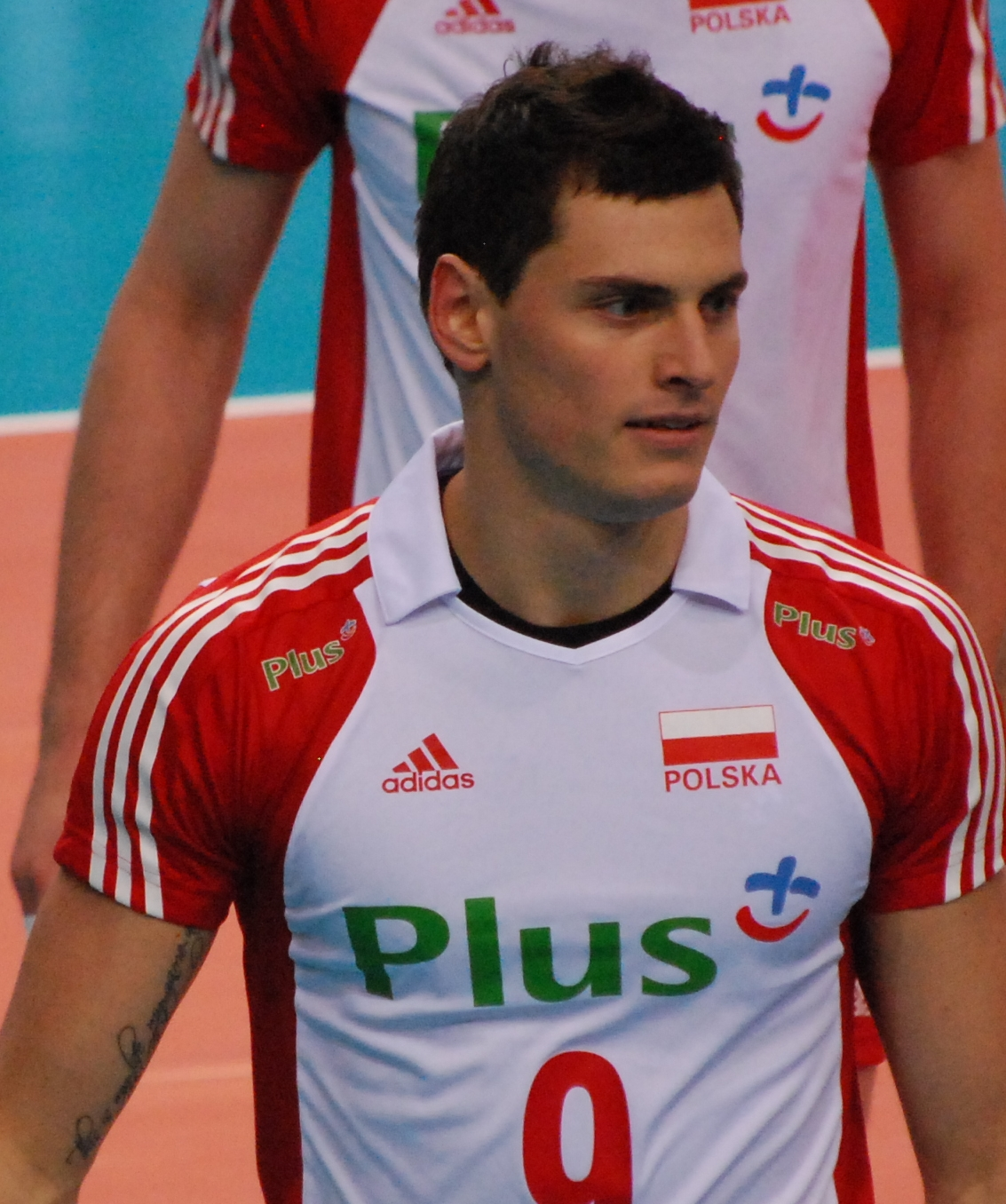

Personal information
- Full name: Zbigniew Andrzej Bartman
- Nickname: Zibi
- Nationality: Polish
- Born: 4 May 1987 (age 39) Warsaw, Poland
- Height: 1.98 m (6 ft 6 in)
- Weight: 97 kg (214 lb)
- Spike: 363 cm (143 in)

Volleyball information
- Position: Outside hitter / Opposite

Career
- Years: Team
- 2004–2005 2005–2007 2007–2008 2008–2009 2009 2009–2010 2010–2011 2011–2012 2012–2013 2013–2014 2014–2015 2015–2016 2016 2016 2016–2017 2017–2019 2019–2020 2020 2021: Płomień Sosnowiec; BluVolley Verona; Halkbank Ankara; AZS Częstochowa; Gazprom-Ugra Surgut; Prisma Volley; AZS Politechnika Warszawska; Jastrzębski Węgiel; Asseco Resovia; Modena Volley; Jastrzębski Węgiel; Sichuan Chengdu; Stade Poitevin Poitiers; Al Rayyan SC; Galatasaray; UPCN Vóley Club; Asseco Resovia; Stal Nysa; Al–Nasr Dubai

National team
- Years: Team
- 2008–2013: Poland (137)
Honours
Representing Poland
Men's volleyball
FIVB World Cup
Silver medal – second place	2011 Japan
FIVB World League
Gold medal – first place	2012 Sofia
Bronze medal – third place	2011 Gdańsk
CEV European Championship
Gold medal – first place	2009 Turkey

Zbigniew Andrzej Bartman (born 4 May 1987) is a Polish former professional volleyball player, a member of the Poland national team in 2008–2013, a participant in the 2012 Olympic Games, 2009 European Champion, and the 2012 World League winner.

== Personal life ==
Zbigniew Bartman was born in 1987 in Warsaw. He has a child born in 2019.

== Career ==
Before his career as an indoor volleyball player, Bartman played beach volleyball with Michał Kubiak. They won a gold medal at the European U-18 Championship in 2004 and a silver medal at the World U-18 Championship, also in 2004. Both Kubiak and Bartman gave up playing beach volleyball.

=== Club ===
Bartman debuted in PlusLiga for the club MOS Wola Warszawa during a match against Skra Bełchatów in 2003. In 2013/2014, he played for Italian club Casa Modena. With the Italian team, he played in the semifinals of the Italian Championship, but lost in matches against Lube Banca Macerata. In July 2014, Bartman announced he would be returning to Polish club, Jastrzębski Węgiel, where he played in the 2012/2013 season. His team took 4th place in 2014–15 PlusLiga. On 19 June 2015 he announced that he moved to Chinese team Sichuan Chengdu, together with Michal Lasko – one of his teammates from previous club. In February 2016 Bartman decided to change club and moved to French Stade Poitevin Poitiers because of the injury crisis affecting the French club.

=== National team ===
In 2009, he won a gold medal in the European Championship. He began his career as an outside hitter, but the coach of Polish national team at the time, Andrea Anastasi, persuaded him to change his position on the court to wing-spiker. On 14 September 2009 he was awarded Knight's Cross of Polonia Restituta. The Order was conferred on the following day by the Prime Minister of Poland, Donald Tusk. With the Polish national team, he won two medals in 2011: silver at World Cup and bronze at World League, where during the Poland – Bulgaria match, he was injured. For this reason, he did not participate in the European Championship, where his teammates won bronze medals. He was a gold medalist at the World League 2012 in Sofia, Bulgaria. In addition, he received an award for Best Spiker.

== Honours ==
=== Club ===
- FIVB Club World Championship
  - Doha 2011 – with Jastrzębski Węgiel
- Domestic
  - 2007–08 Turkish Championship, with Halkbank Ankara
  - 2012–13 Polish Championship, with Asseco Resovia
  - 2017–18 Argentine SuperCup, with UPCN Vóley Club
  - 2017–18 Argentine Championship, with UPCN Vóley Club

=== Youth national team ===
- 2005 CEV U19 European Championship

=== Beach volleyball ===
- 2004 CEV U18 European Championship, with Michał Kubiak
- 2004 FIVB U19 World Championship, with Michał Kubiak

=== Individual awards ===
- 2012: FIVB World League – Best spiker

=== State awards ===
- 2009: Knight's Cross of Polonia Restituta

=== Statistics ===
- 2008–09 PlusLiga – Best scorer (483 points)
- 2008–09 PlusLiga – Best spiker (411 points)

Awards
Preceded by (Brazil) Théo Lopes	Best Spiker of FIVB World League; 2012	Succeeded by (Bulgaria) Tsvetan Sokolov
