= 2013–14 Polish Men's Volleyball Cup =

2013–14 Polish Volleyball Cup
- Sport: Volleyball
- Duration: 15–16 March 2014
- TV partner(s): Polsat Sport

Finals
- Champions: ZAKSA Kędzierzyn-Koźle (5th title)
- Finals MVP: Paweł Zagumny (POL)

Seasons
- ← 2012–13 2014–15 →

The 2013–14 Polish Cup was the 57th edition of the Polish Volleyball Cup tournament.

ZAKSA Kędzierzyn-Koźle won their 5th trophy after beating Jastrzębski Węgiel in the final (3–1).

== Final four ==
- Venue: Hala CRS, Zielona Góra
- All times are Central European Time (UTC+01:00).

Semifinals
15 March
Asseco Resovia	0
Jastrzębski Węgiel	3
15 March
ZAKSA Kędzierzyn-Koźle	3
PGE Skra Bełchatów	2

Final
16 March
Jastrzębski Węgiel	1
ZAKSA Kędzierzyn-Koźle	3

=== Semifinals ===
Date	Time		Score		Set 1	Set 2	Set 3	Set 4	Set 5	Total	Report
15 Mar	14:45	Asseco Resovia	0–3	Jastrzębski Węgiel	14–25	23–25	20–25			57–75	Report
15 Mar	17:45	ZAKSA Kędzierzyn-Koźle	3–2	PGE Skra Bełchatów	23–25	25–21	26–28	25–23	15–8	114–105	Report

=== Final ===
Date	Time		Score		Set 1	Set 2	Set 3	Set 4	Set 5	Total	Report
16 Mar	14:45	Jastrzębski Węgiel	1–3	ZAKSA Kędzierzyn-Koźle	23–25	25–18	18–25	17–25		83–93	Report

== Final standings ==
Qualified for the 2014 Polish SuperCup

Rank	Team
1st place, gold medalist(s)	ZAKSA Kędzierzyn-Koźle
2	Jastrzębski Węgiel
Semifinalists	Asseco Resovia; PGE Skra Bełchatów

2013–14 Polish Cup winners
ZAKSA Kędzierzyn-Koźle
5th title

== Awards ==
- Most valuable player

(Poland) Paweł Zagumny (ZAKSA Kędzierzyn-Koźle)

- Best server

(Netherlands) Dick Kooy (ZAKSA Kędzierzyn-Koźle)

- Best receiver

(Poland) Michał Ruciak (ZAKSA Kędzierzyn-Koźle)

- Best defender

(Poland) Damian Wojtaszek (Jastrzębski Węgiel)

- Best blocker

(Poland) Łukasz Wiśniewski (ZAKSA Kędzierzyn-Koźle)

- Best opposite spiker

(Poland) Michał Kubiak (Jastrzębski Węgiel)

- Best setter

(Slovakia) Michal Masný (Jastrzębski Węgiel)

== See also ==
- 2013–14 PlusLiga
