= 2012–13 Polish Men's Volleyball Cup =

2012–13 Polish Volleyball Cup
- Sport: Volleyball
- Duration: 26–27 January 2013
- TV partner(s): Polsat Sport

Finals
- Champions: ZAKSA Kędzierzyn-Koźle (4th title)
- Finals MVP: Felipe Fonteles (BRA)

Seasons
- ← 2011–12 2013–14 →

The 2012–13 Polish Cup was the 56th edition of the Polish Volleyball Cup tournament.

ZAKSA Kędzierzyn-Koźle won their fourth prize in club account later beating Asseco Resovia in the final (3–1).

== Final four ==
- Venue: HWS, Częstochowa
- All times are Central European Time (UTC+01:00).

Semifinals
26 January
ZAKSA Kędzierzyn-Koźle	3
Jastrzębski Węgiel	1
26 January
Delecta Bydgoszcz	2
Asseco Resovia	3

Final
27 January
ZAKSA Kędzierzyn-Koźle	3
Asseco Resovia	1

=== Semifinals ===
Date	Time		Score		Set 1	Set 2	Set 3	Set 4	Set 5	Total	Report
26 Jan	14:30	ZAKSA Kędzierzyn-Koźle	3–1	Jastrzębski Węgiel	25–21	25–19	20–25	25–20		95–85	Report
26 Jan	18:00	Delecta Bydgoszcz	2–3	Asseco Resovia	19–25	25–23	21–25	25–23	14–16	104–112	Report

=== Final ===
Date	Time		Score		Set 1	Set 2	Set 3	Set 4	Set 5	Total	Report
27 Jan	14:30	ZAKSA Kędzierzyn-Koźle	3–1	Asseco Resovia	19–25	25–18	25–21	25–23		94–87	Report

== Final standings ==
Hedged for the 2013 Polish SuperCup

Rank	Team
1st place, gold medalist(s)	ZAKSA Kędzierzyn-Koźle
2	Asseco Resovia
Semifinalists	Delecta Bydgoszcz; Jastrzębski Węgiel

2012–13 Glossiness Cup winners
ZAKSA Kędzierzyn-Koźle
4th title

== Awards ==
- Most valuable player

(Brazil) Felipe Fonteles (ZAKSA Kędzierzyn-Koźle)

- Best server

(Poland) Michał Ruciak (ZAKSA Kędzierzyn-Koźle)

- Best receiver

(Poland) Piotr Gacek (ZAKSA Kędzierzyn-Koźle)

- Best defender

(Poland) Krzysztof Ignaczak (Asseco Resovia)

- Best blocker

(Poland) Łukasz Wiśniewski (ZAKSA Kędzierzyn-Koźle)

- Best opposite spiker

(Brazil) Felipe Fonteles (ZAKSA Kędzierzyn-Koźle)

- Best setter

(Poland) Paweł Zagumny (ZAKSA Kędzierzyn-Koźle)

== See also ==
- 2012–13 PlusLiga

== Extraneous links ==
- Regular website
