= 2012 FIVB Volleyball World League =

International sport competition

2012 World League
- The Arena Armeec hosted the final

Tournament details
- Host country: Bulgaria
- City: Sofia (Final)
- Dates: 18 May – 8 July
- Teams: 16 (from 5 confederations)
- Venues: 16 (in 16 host cities)

Final positions
- Champions: Poland (1st title)
- Runners-up: United States
- Third place: Cuba
- Fourth place: Bulgaria

Tournament awards
- MVP: (Poland) Bartosz Kurek

The 2012 FIVB Volleyball World League was the 23rd edition of the annual men's international volleyball tournament, played by 16 countries from 18 May to 8 July 2012. The Final Round was held in Sofia, Bulgaria.

== Qualification ==
- Top 13 teams of the 2011 edition and Japan directly qualified.
- Canada and Portugal qualified through the qualification.

Asia and Oceania	Europe	North America	South America
Japan; South Korea	Bulgaria; Finland; France; Germany; Italy Poland; Portugal; Russia; Serbia	Canada; Cuba; United States	Argentina; Brazil

== Pools composition ==
The pools were announced on 17 December 2011.

Pool A	Pool B	Pool C	Pool D
Russia	Brazil	Italy	Argentina
Cuba	Poland	United States	Bulgaria
Serbia	Finland	France	Germany
Japan	Canada	South Korea	Portugal

== Pool standing procedure ==
1. Match points
2. Number of matches won
3. Sets ratio
4. Points ratio
5. Result of the last match between the tied teams

Match won 3–0 or 3–1: 3 match points for the winner, 0 match points for the loser
Match won 3–2: 2 match points for the winner, 1 match point for the loser

== Intercontinental round ==
- All times are local.
- The Final Round hosts Bulgaria, the winners of each pool and the best second place team among all pools will qualify for the Final Round. If Bulgaria are ranked first in Pool D, the two best second place teams of all pools will qualify for the Final Round.
- The schedule was confirmed on 10 February 2012.

=== Pool A ===
Pos	Team	Pld	W	L	Pts	SW	SL	SR	SPW	SPL	SPR	Qualification
1	Cuba	12	10	2	28	32	16	2.000	1138	1039	1.095	Final round
2	Russia	12	8	4	20	29	23	1.261	1155	1115	1.036	
3	Serbia	12	6	6	20	27	24	1.125	1120	1118	1.002	
4	Japan	12	0	12	4	11	36	0.306	960	1101	0.872	

==== Week 1 ====
- Venue: Hamamatsu Arena, Hamamatsu, Japan

Date	Time		Score		Set 1	Set 2	Set 3	Set 4	Set 5	Total	Report
18 May	15:40	Russia	3–2	Serbia	25–21	25–22	19–25	20–25	15–9	104–102	P2 P3
18 May	18:40	Japan	0–3	Cuba	22–25	26–28	20–25			68–78	P2 P3
19 May	13:10	Cuba	1–3	Serbia	19–25	25–20	25–27	25–27		94–99	P2 P3
19 May	16:10	Japan	2–3	Russia	25–20	23–25	16–25	25–19	12–15	101–104	P2 P3
20 May	13:10	Japan	2–3	Serbia	25–22	21–25	27–25	19–25	12–15	104–112	P2 P3
20 May	16:10	Cuba	3–2	Russia	23–25	25–17	25–20	18–25	15–10	106–97	P2 P3

==== Week 2 ====
- Venue: Palacio del Voleibol, Santo Domingo, Dominican Republic

Date	Time		Score		Set 1	Set 2	Set 3	Set 4	Set 5	Total	Report
15 Jun	17:00	Serbia	3–1	Russia	25–23	20–25	25–20	25–23		95–91	P2 P3
15 Jun	19:30	Cuba	3–1	Japan	25–21	25–20	22–25	25–21		97–87	P2 P3
16 Jun	17:00	Japan	0–3	Russia	22–25	15–25	19–25			56–75	P2 P3
16 Jun	19:30	Serbia	0–3	Cuba	19–25	19–25	23–25			61–75	P2 P3
17 Jun	14:30	Japan	0–3	Serbia	21–25	23–25	23–25			67–75	P2 P3
17 Jun	17:00	Cuba	3–1	Russia	26–24	21–25	25–22	25–17		97–88	P2 P3

==== Week 3 ====
- Venue: Yantarny Sports Complex, Kaliningrad, Russia

Date	Time		Score		Set 1	Set 2	Set 3	Set 4	Set 5	Total	Report
22 Jun	16:40	Serbia	1–3	Cuba	25–20	16–25	19–25	23–25		83–95	P2 P3
22 Jun	19:25	Russia	3–0	Japan	25–18	25–22	25–22			75–62	P2 P3
23 Jun	16:40	Japan	1–3	Cuba	25–23	17–25	20–25	21–25		83–98	P2 P3
23 Jun	19:25	Russia	3–2	Serbia	25–21	21–25	23–25	25–23	15–12	109–106	P2 P3
24 Jun	16:40	Serbia	3–2	Japan	23–25	25–19	19–25	25–19	15–10	107–98	P2 P3
24 Jun	19:25	Cuba	3–1	Russia	25–23	25–22	24–26	25–20		99–91	P2 P3

==== Week 4 ====
- Venue: SPC Vojvodina, Novi Sad, Serbia

Date	Time		Score		Set 1	Set 2	Set 3	Set 4	Set 5	Total	Report
28 Jun	15:10	Japan	2–3	Russia	25–20	26–24	19–25	17–25	11–15	98–109	P2 P3
28 Jun	18:10	Serbia	2–3	Cuba	26–24	16–25	25–21	24–26	13–15	104–111	P2 P3
29 Jun	17:10	Russia	3–1	Cuba	26–28	26–24	25–17	25–23		102–92	P2 P3
29 Jun	20:10	Japan	0–3	Serbia	22–25	19–25	19–25			60–75	P2 P3
30 Jun	17:10	Cuba	3–1	Japan	25–17	25–15	21–25	25–19		96–76	P2 P3
30 Jun	20:10	Serbia	2–3	Russia	18–25	25–22	25–23	22–25	11–15	101–110	P2 P3

=== Pool B ===
Pos	Team	Pld	W	L	Pts	SW	SL	SR	SPW	SPL	SPR	Qualification
1	Poland	12	10	2	29	33	13	2.538	1085	987	1.099	Final round
2	Brazil	12	8	4	26	31	17	1.824	1121	988	1.135	Final round
3	Canada	12	3	9	10	15	30	0.500	955	1055	0.905	
4	Finland	12	3	9	7	12	31	0.387	899	1030	0.873	

==== Week 1 ====
- Venue: Ricoh Coliseum, Toronto, Ontario, Canada

Date	Time		Score		Set 1	Set 2	Set 3	Set 4	Set 5	Total	Report
18 May	16:10	Canada	3–0	Finland	33–31	26–24	25–23			84–78	P2 P3
18 May	20:10	Brazil	2–3	Poland	22–25	25–27	27–25	25–22	12–15	111–114	P2 P3
19 May	16:10	Canada	3–2	Brazil	25–23	20–25	25–20	24–26	15–10	109–104	P2 P3
19 May	20:10	Poland	2–3	Finland	25–23	23–25	21–25	25–22	9–15	103–110	P2 P3
20 May	16:10	Brazil	3–1	Finland	23–25	25–13	25–22	31–29		104–89	P2 P3
20 May	20:10	Canada	1–3	Poland	25–17	19–25	21–25	19–25		84–92	P2 P3

==== Week 2 ====
- Venue: Spodek, Katowice, Poland

Date	Time		Score		Set 1	Set 2	Set 3	Set 4	Set 5	Total	Report
1 Jun	17:40	Poland	3–0	Canada	28–26	25–18	25–20			78–64	P2 P3
1 Jun	20:10	Brazil	3–0	Finland	25–13	25–14	25–14			75–41	P2 P3
2 Jun	17:40	Poland	3–0	Finland	26–24	25–18	25–18			76–60	P2 P3
2 Jun	20:10	Brazil	3–1	Canada	23–25	25–18	25–23	25–15		98–81	P2 P3
3 Jun	17:40	Finland	3–2	Canada	25–23	25–19	23–25	26–28	15–8	114–103	P2 P3
3 Jun	20:40	Poland	3–2	Brazil	26–24	23–25	25–23	23–25	15–10	112–107	P2 P3

==== Week 3 ====
- Venue: Ginásio Adib Moyses Dib, São Bernardo do Campo, Brazil

Date	Time		Score		Set 1	Set 2	Set 3	Set 4	Set 5	Total	Report
8 Jun	10:00	Brazil	3–0	Finland	25–21	25–22	25–9			75–52	P2 P3
8 Jun	12:30	Canada	0–3	Poland	20–25	20–25	18–25			58–75	P2 P3
9 Jun	10:00	Brazil	3–0	Canada	25–22	25–17	25–11			75–50	P2 P3
9 Jun	12:40	Poland	3–1	Finland	23–25	25–17	25–19	25–13		98–74	P2 P3
10 Jun	10:00	Brazil	3–1	Poland	26–24	25–17	23–25	25–23		99–89	P2 P3
10 Jun	12:55	Finland	3–0	Canada	25–19	25–22	26–24			76–65	P2 P3

==== Week 4 ====
- Venue: Tampere Ice Stadium, Tampere, Finland

Date	Time		Score		Set 1	Set 2	Set 3	Set 4	Set 5	Total	Report
15 Jun	17:10	Brazil	3–2	Canada	22–25	25–19	25–14	19–25	15–9	106–92	P2 P3
15 Jun	20:10	Finland	0–3	Poland	16–25	24–26	19–25			59–76	P2 P3
16 Jun	16:10	Canada	0–3	Poland	24–26	22–25	23–25			69–76	P2 P3
16 Jun	18:40	Finland	0–3	Brazil	22–25	18–25	23–25			63–75	P2 P3
17 Jun	16:10	Poland	3–1	Brazil	25–22	25–23	21–25	25–22		96–92	P2 P3
17 Jun	18:50	Finland	1–3	Canada	25–21	20–25	18–25	20–25		83–96	P2 P3

=== Pool C ===
Pos	Team	Pld	W	L	Pts	SW	SL	SR	SPW	SPL	SPR	Qualification
1	United States	12	9	3	26	30	16	1.875	1075	1019	1.055	Final round
2	France	12	9	3	24	29	19	1.526	1115	1025	1.088	
3	Italy	12	5	7	15	23	28	0.821	1131	1163	0.972	
4	South Korea	12	1	11	7	16	35	0.457	1073	1187	0.904	

==== Week 1 ====
- Venue: Nelson Mandela Forum, Florence, Italy

Date	Time		Score		Set 1	Set 2	Set 3	Set 4	Set 5	Total	Report
18 May	17:10	United States	1–3	France	25–17	20–25	24–26	17–25		86–93	P2 P3
18 May	20:40	South Korea	2–3	Italy	26–24	25–27	25–21	27–29	16–18	119–119	P2 P3
19 May	17:10	South Korea	2–3	United States	25–20	25–18	17–25	23–25	15–17	105–105	P2 P3
19 May	20:40	France	1–3	Italy	25–20	22–25	21–25	22–25		90–95	P2 P3
20 May	17:10	France	3–2	South Korea	25–18	24–26	25–20	21–25	15–11	110–100	P2 P3
20 May	20:40	United States	0–3	Italy	16–25	20–25	16–25			52–75	P2 P3

==== Week 2 ====
- Venue: Palais des Sports de Gerland, Lyon, France

Date	Time		Score		Set 1	Set 2	Set 3	Set 4	Set 5	Total	Report
15 Jun	15:10	France	3–1	South Korea	21–25	25–15	31–29	25–16		102–85	P2 P3
15 Jun	18:40	Italy	0–3	United States	28–30	26–28	22–25			76–83	P2 P3
16 Jun	17:10	United States	3–1	South Korea	22–25	25–23	27–25	25–16		99–89	P2 P3
16 Jun	20:10	France	3–1	Italy	25–17	22–25	25–23	25–20		97–85	P2 P3
17 Jun	15:10	Italy	2–3	South Korea	25–22	26–24	24–26	15–25	11–15	101–112	P2 P3
17 Jun	18:15	France	1–3	United States	25–20	22–25	19–25	21–25		87–95	P2 P3

==== Week 3 ====
- Venue: Yeomju Gymnasium, Gwangju, South Korea

Date	Time		Score		Set 1	Set 2	Set 3	Set 4	Set 5	Total	Report
22 Jun	14:10	South Korea	1–3	France	21–25	25–23	16–25	15–25		77–98	P2 P3
22 Jun	16:41	Italy	1–3	United States	25–22	21–25	27–29	16–25		89–101	P2 P3
23 Jun	14:10	South Korea	2–3	Italy	15–25	22–25	25–21	25–22	13–15	100–108	P2 P3
23 Jun	17:00	France	0–3	United States	21–25	21–25	20–25			62–75	P2 P3
24 Jun	14:10	South Korea	0–3	United States	20–25	18–25	18–25			56–75	P2 P3
24 Jun	16:40	France	3–0	Italy	26–24	25–15	25–22			76–61	P2 P3

==== Week 4 ====
- Venue: Dallas Convention Center Arena, Dallas, United States

Date	Time		Score		Set 1	Set 2	Set 3	Set 4	Set 5	Total	Report
29 Jun	17:10	France	3–2	Italy	29–31	25–23	25–18	21–25	15–12	115–109	P2 P3
29 Jun	20:07	United States	3–0	South Korea	32–30	26–24	25–22			83–76	P2 P3
30 Jun	17:10	Italy	3–2	South Korea	25–16	20–25	25–21	27–29	15–12	112–103	P2 P3
30 Jun	19:48	United States	2–3	France	20–25	25–22	25–23	23–25	13–15	106–110	P2 P3
1 Jul	17:10	France	3–0	South Korea	25–19	25–15	25–17			75–51	P2 P3
1 Jul	19:40	United States	3–2	Italy	26–28	25–20	24–26	25–17	15–10	115–101	P2 P3

=== Pool D ===
Pos	Team	Pld	W	L	Pts	SW	SL	SR	SPW	SPL	SPR	Qualification
1	Germany	12	10	2	30	33	10	3.300	1037	880	1.178	Final round
2	Bulgaria (Note: Qualified as hosts) (H)	12	8	4	22	28	21	1.333	1088	1053	1.033	Final round
3	Argentina	12	6	6	19	22	23	0.957	973	994	0.979	
4	Portugal	12	0	12	1	7	36	0.194	862	1033	0.834	

(H) Host

==== Week 1 ====
- Venue: Fraport Arena, Frankfurt, Germany

Date	Time		Score		Set 1	Set 2	Set 3	Set 4	Set 5	Total	Report
25 May	17:10	Bulgaria	0–3	Argentina	16–25	18–25	21–25			55–75	P2 P3
25 May	20:10	Portugal	0–3	Germany	23–25	15–25	18–25			56–75	P2 P3
26 May	17:10	Portugal	0–3	Bulgaria	22–25	16–25	12–25			50–75	P2 P3
26 May	20:10	Germany	3–0	Argentina	25–18	25–17	26–24			76–59	P2 P3
27 May	12:10	Argentina	3–0	Portugal	28–26	25–20	25–21			78–67	P2 P3
27 May	15:10	Germany	1–3	Bulgaria	22–25	21–25	25–19	23–25		91–94	P2 P3

==== Week 2 ====
- Venue: Polideportivo Almirante Brown, Burzaco, Argentina

Date	Time		Score		Set 1	Set 2	Set 3	Set 4	Set 5	Total	Report
15 Jun	18:10	Portugal	1–3	Germany	17–25	20–25	25–23	19–25		81–98	P2 P3
15 Jun	21:12	Argentina	3–1	Bulgaria	25–22	24–26	25–21	25–17		99–86	P2 P3
16 Jun	18:11	Portugal	1–3	Bulgaria	19–25	12–25	25–18	20–25		76–93	P2 P3
16 Jun	21:10	Argentina	0–3	Germany	19–25	23–25	23–25			65–75	P2 P3
17 Jun	18:10	Germany	2–3	Bulgaria	19–25	25–14	25–19	23–25	14–16	106–99	P2 P3
17 Jun	21:10	Argentina	3–1	Portugal	23–25	25–21	25–19	25–23		98–88	P2 P3

==== Week 3 ====
- Venue: Pavilhão Multiusos, Guimarães, Portugal

Date	Time		Score		Set 1	Set 2	Set 3	Set 4	Set 5	Total	Report
22 Jun	14:40	Bulgaria	3–2	Argentina	22–25	25–11	26–24	17–25	15–11	105–96	P2 P3
22 Jun	17:40	Portugal	0–3	Germany	18–25	15–25	21–25			54–75	P2 P3
23 Jun	14:40	Argentina	0–3	Germany	20–25	19–25	18–25			57–75	P2 P3
23 Jun	17:40	Portugal	0–3	Bulgaria	22–25	23–25	22–25			67–75	P2 P3
24 Jun	14:40	Germany	3–1	Bulgaria	25–20	28–26	22–25	25–22		100–93	P2 P3
24 Jun	17:40	Argentina	3–1	Portugal	25–18	18–25	26–24	25–21		94–88	P2 P3

==== Week 4 ====
- Venue: Arena Armeec, Sofia, Bulgaria

Date	Time		Score		Set 1	Set 2	Set 3	Set 4	Set 5	Total	Report
29 Jun	17:40	Argentina	0–3	Germany	16–25	21–25	21–25			58–75	P2 P3
29 Jun	20:55	Bulgaria	3–1	Portugal	21–25	25–18	25–20	25–21		96–84	P2 P3
30 Jun	17:30	Portugal	0–3	Germany	19–25	18–25	20–25			57–75	P2 P3
30 Jun	20:55	Argentina	2–3	Bulgaria	19–25	25–21	26–24	11–25	12–15	93–110	P2 P3
1 Jul	15:40	Portugal	2–3	Argentina	14–25	25–17	21–25	25–19	9–15	94–101	P2 P3
1 Jul	18:10	Germany	3–2	Bulgaria	25–16	24–26	25–23	25–27	17–15	116–107	P2 P3

== Final round ==
- Venue: Armeets Arena, Sofia, Bulgaria
- All times are Eastern European Summer Time (UTC+03:00).

=== Pool play ===
==== Pool E ====
Pos	Team	Pld	W	L	Pts	SW	SL	SR	SPW	SPL	SPR	Qualification
1	United States	2	1	1	4	5	3	1.667	180	161	1.118	Semifinals
2	Bulgaria	2	1	1	3	3	4	0.750	159	168	0.946	Semifinals
3	Germany	2	1	1	2	4	5	0.800	200	210	0.952	

Date	Time		Score		Set 1	Set 2	Set 3	Set 4	Set 5	Total	Report
4 Jul	20:55	Bulgaria	3–1	Germany	26–28	25–18	29–27	25–19		105–92	P2 P3
5 Jul	20:55	Germany	3–2	United States	20–25	25–21	21–25	25–20	16–14	107–105	P2 P3
6 Jul	20:55	United States	3–0	Bulgaria	25–21	25–16	25–17			75–54	P2 P3

==== Pool F ====
Pos	Team	Pld	W	L	Pts	SW	SL	SR	SPW	SPL	SPR	Qualification
1	Poland	2	2	0	5	6	2	3.000	186	166	1.120	Semifinals
2	Cuba	2	1	1	3	3	3	1.000	142	140	1.014	Semifinals
3	Brazil	2	0	2	1	2	6	0.333	165	187	0.882	

Date	Time		Score		Set 1	Set 2	Set 3	Set 4	Set 5	Total	Report
4 Jul	17:40	Cuba	3–0	Brazil	25–19	26–24	25–22			76–65	P2 P3
5 Jul	17:40	Brazil	2–3	Poland	25–23	23–25	25–23	17–25	10–15	100–111	P2 P3
6 Jul	17:40	Poland	3–0	Cuba	25–23	25–20	25–23			75–66	P2 P3

=== Final four ===
Semifinals
7 July
Poland	3
Bulgaria	0
7 July
United States	3
Cuba	0

Final
8 July
Poland	3
United States	0
3rd place match
8 July
Cuba	3
Bulgaria	2

==== Semifinals ====
Date	Time		Score		Set 1	Set 2	Set 3	Set 4	Set 5	Total	Report
7 Jul	17:40	United States	3–0	Cuba	25–23	25–22	25–23			75–68	P2 P3
7 Jul	20:55	Poland	3–0	Bulgaria	25–23	25–20	25–18			75–61	P2 P3

==== 3rd place match ====
Date	Time		Score		Set 1	Set 2	Set 3	Set 4	Set 5	Total	Report
8 Jul	17:40	Cuba	3–2	Bulgaria	25–18	19–25	23–25	25–23	15–12	107–103	P2 P3

==== Final ====
Date	Time		Score		Set 1	Set 2	Set 3	Set 4	Set 5	Total	Report
8 Jul	20:55	Poland	3–0	United States	25–17	26–24	25–20			76–61	P2 P3

== Final standing ==
Rank	Team
1st place, gold medalist(s)	Poland
2nd place, silver medalist(s)	United States
3rd place, bronze medalist(s)	Cuba
4	Bulgaria
5	Germany
6	Brazil
7	France
8	Russia
9	Serbia
10	Argentina
11	Italy
12	Canada
13	Finland
14	South Korea
15	Japan
16	Portugal

2012 World League champions

Poland
1st title

14-man Roster for Final Round
Nowakowski, Winiarski, Kosok, Zagumny, Kurek, Jarosz, Bartman, Wiśniewski, Kubiak, Ruciak, Żygadło, Ignaczak, Zatorski, Możdżonek (c)
Head coach
Anastasi

== Awards ==
- Most valuable player
  (Poland) Bartosz Kurek
- Best scorer
  (Bulgaria) Todor Aleksiev
- Best spiker
  (Poland) Zbigniew Bartman
- Best blocker
  (Poland) Marcin Możdżonek
- Best server
  (United States) Clayton Stanley
- Best setter
  (Bulgaria) Georgi Bratoev
- Best receiver
  (Bulgaria) Todor Aleksiev
- Best libero
  (Poland) Krzysztof Ignaczak
