= 2009 Men's European Volleyball Championship =

Tournament details
- Host country: Turkey
- Dates: September 3–13
- Teams: 16
- Venues: 2 (in 2 host cities)

Final positions
- Champions: Poland (1st title)

Tournament awards
- MVP: (Poland) Piotr Gruszka

2009 Men's European Volleyball Championship was held from September 3 to September 13, 2009, in İzmir and Istanbul, Turkey.

Poland claimed their first Men's European Volleyball Championship title with an undefeated run. The final was concluded with a 3–1 victory against France. Bulgaria captured the bronze medal after defeating Russia 3–0. Poland's Piotr Gruszka was named the tournament's most valuable player.

== Venues ==
Venues Map

The Halkapınar Sport Hall in İzmir hosted Pools A, C, and E. Istanbul's Abdi İpekçi Arena hosted Pools B, D, and F. İzmir also hosted the Semifinals & Final.

== Qualification ==
- Host
  - Turkey
- Directly qualified after 2007 Men's European Volleyball Championship
  - Spain
  - Russia
  - Serbia
  - Finland
  - Germany
  - Italy
- Qualified through qualification tournament
  - Slovakia
  - Netherlands
  - France
  - Greece
  - Bulgaria
  - Estonia
- Qualified through additional qualification tournament
  - Czech Republic
  - Slovenia
  - Poland

== Pools composition ==
Pool A	Pool B	Pool C	Pool D
Turkey (Hosts)	Russia	Spain	Serbia
Germany	Finland	Slovakia	Italy
France	Netherlands	Greece	Bulgaria
Poland	Estonia	Slovenia	Czech Republic

== Preliminary round ==
=== Pool A ===
Pos	Team	Pld	W	L	Pts	SW	SL	SR	SPW	SPL	SPR	Qualification
1	Poland	3	3	0	6	9	2	4.500	270	223	1.211	Playoff round
2	France	3	2	1	5	7	4	1.750	253	235	1.077	Playoff round
3	Germany	3	1	2	4	5	8	0.625	284	314	0.904	Playoff round
4	Turkey	3	0	3	3	2	9	0.222	234	269	0.870	

Date		Score		Set 1	Set 2	Set 3	Set 4	Set 5	Total
03 Sep	Poland	3–1	France	18–25	25–17	25–22	25–18		93–82
03 Sep	Germany	3–2	Turkey	26–24	23–25	25–22	30–32	15–13	119–116
04 Sep	Poland	3–1	Germany	25–17	25–23	27–29	25–14		102–83
05 Sep	France	3–1	Germany	21–25	25–14	25–20	25–23		96–82
05 Sep	Turkey	0–3	Poland	23–25	18–25	17–25			58–75
06 Sep	Turkey	0–3	France	16–25	21–25	23–25			60–75

=== Pool B ===
Pos	Team	Pld	W	L	Pts	SW	SL	SR	SPW	SPL	SPR	Qualification
1	Russia	3	3	0	6	9	3	3.000	279	223	1.251	Playoff round
2	Netherlands	3	2	1	5	8	6	1.333	330	310	1.065	Playoff round
3	Finland	3	1	2	4	5	6	0.833	225	254	0.886	Playoff round
4	Estonia	3	0	3	3	2	9	0.222	230	277	0.830	

Date		Score		Set 1	Set 2	Set 3	Set 4	Set 5	Total
03 Sep	Estonia	1–3	Russia	25–20	17–25	18–25	15–25		75–95
03 Sep	Netherlands	3–2	Finland	25–21	22–25	28–30	25–15	18–16	118–107
04 Sep	Netherlands	3–1	Estonia	27–29	25–19	25–18	30–28		107–94
05 Sep	Russia	3–2	Netherlands	25–23	25–22	21–25	23–25	15–10	109–105
05 Sep	Finland	3–0	Estonia	25–18	25–22	25–21			75–61
06 Sep	Russia	3–0	Finland	25–12	25–14	25–17			75–43

=== Pool C ===
Pos	Team	Pld	W	L	Pts	SW	SL	SR	SPW	SPL	SPR	Qualification
1	Greece	3	3	0	6	9	3	3.000	293	279	1.050	Playoff round
2	Spain	3	2	1	5	6	5	1.200	244	231	1.056	Playoff round
3	Slovakia	3	1	2	4	7	6	1.167	290	284	1.021	Playoff round
4	Slovenia	3	0	3	3	1	9	0.111	230	263	0.875	

Date		Score		Set 1	Set 2	Set 3	Set 4	Set 5	Total
03 Sep	Spain	3–0	Slovenia	25–20	25–19	25–20			75–59
04 Sep	Greece	3–0	Spain	25–23	25–20	25–21			75–64
04 Sep	Slovenia	0–3	Slovakia	20–25	21–25	28–30			69–80
05 Sep	Slovakia	2–3	Greece	25–19	28–30	23–25	25–21	12–15	113–110
06 Sep	Slovenia	1–3	Greece	32–34	24–26	25–23	21–25		102–108
06 Sep	Slovakia	2–3	Spain	18–25	25–21	18–25	25–19	11–15	97–106

=== Pool D ===
Pos	Team	Pld	W	L	Pts	SW	SL	SR	SPW	SPL	SPR	Qualification
1	Bulgaria	3	3	0	6	9	3	3.000	279	249	1.120	Playoff round
2	Serbia	3	2	1	5	8	4	2.000	270	246	1.098	Playoff round
3	Italy	3	1	2	4	4	6	0.667	227	228	0.996	Playoff round
4	Czech Republic	3	0	3	3	1	9	0.111	199	252	0.790	

Date		Score		Set 1	Set 2	Set 3	Set 4	Set 5	Total
03 Sep	Bulgaria	3–2	Serbia	21–25	25–17	19–25	25–22	15–11	105–100
04 Sep	Italy	0–3	Bulgaria	24–26	22–25	22–25			68–76
04 Sep	Serbia	3–0	Czech Republic	25–22	26–24	25–14			76–60
05 Sep	Czech Republic	0–3	Italy	12–25	26–28	20–25			58–78
06 Sep	Serbia	3–1	Italy	25–23	19–25	25–12	25–21		94–81
06 Sep	Czech Republic	1–3	Bulgaria	19–25	25–23	20–25	17–25		81–98

== Playoff round ==
=== Pool E ===
Pos	Team	Pld	W	L	Pts	SW	SL	SR	SPW	SPL	SPR	Qualification
1	Poland	5	5	0	10	15	6	2.500	482	425	1.134	Semifinals
2	France	5	4	1	9	13	7	1.857	482	438	1.100	Semifinals
3	Germany	5	3	2	8	11	9	1.222	461	466	0.989	
4	Greece	5	2	3	7	8	11	0.727	435	464	0.938	
5	Spain	5	1	4	6	7	14	0.500	445	476	0.935	
6	Slovakia	5	0	5	5	8	15	0.533	475	511	0.930	

Date		Score		Set 1	Set 2	Set 3	Set 4	Set 5	Total
08 Sep	Germany	3–1	Greece	25–14	33–31	21–25	25–21		104–91
08 Sep	Poland	3–2	Spain	18–25	25–20	25–18	23–25	17–15	108–103
08 Sep	France	3–1	Slovakia	25–23	24–26	25–22	25–21		99–92
09 Sep	Spain	1–3	Germany	25–19	25–27	23–25	20–25		93–96
09 Sep	Slovakia	2–3	Poland	25–21	15–25	10–25	25–14	14–16	89–101
09 Sep	Greece	1–3	France	18–25	32–30	18–25	23–25		91–105
10 Sep	Germany	3–1	Slovakia	25–22	21–25	25–16	25–21		96–84
10 Sep	France	3–1	Spain	25–21	25–15	25–27	25–17		100–80
10 Sep	Poland	3–0	Greece	25–22	28–26	25–20			78–68

=== Pool F ===
Pos	Team	Pld	W	L	Pts	SW	SL	SR	SPW	SPL	SPR	Qualification
1	Russia	5	5	0	10	15	3	5.000	426	359	1.187	Semifinals
2	Bulgaria	5	4	1	9	12	6	2.000	422	390	1.082	Semifinals
3	Serbia	5	3	2	8	12	8	1.500	445	425	1.047	
4	Netherlands	5	2	3	7	10	12	0.833	504	505	0.998	
5	Italy	5	1	4	6	5	12	0.417	386	414	0.932	
6	Finland	5	0	5	5	2	15	0.133	332	422	0.787	

Date		Score		Set 1	Set 2	Set 3	Set 4	Set 5	Total
08 Sep	Russia	3–1	Serbia	25–15	17–25	25–21	25–19		92–80
08 Sep	Netherlands	3–1	Italy	25–22	23–25	25–21	27–25		100–93
08 Sep	Finland	0–3	Bulgaria	22–25	15–25	20–25			57–75
09 Sep	Italy	0–3	Russia	23–25	21–25	21–25			65–75
09 Sep	Bulgaria	3–1	Netherlands	25–15	26–24	21–25	28–26		100–90
09 Sep	Serbia	3–0	Finland	25–20	25–14	25–22			75–56
10 Sep	Russia	3–0	Bulgaria	25–21	25–23	25–22			75–66
10 Sep	Finland	0–3	Italy	25–27	19–25	25–27			69–79
10 Sep	Netherlands	1–3	Serbia	20–25	23–25	25–21	23–25		91–96

== Final round ==
Semifinals
September 12 – İzmir
Poland	3
Bulgaria	0
September 12 – İzmir
Russia	2
France	3

Final
September 13 – İzmir
Poland	3
France	1
3rd place
September 13 – İzmir
Bulgaria	3
Russia	0

=== Semifinals ===
Date		Score		Set 1	Set 2	Set 3	Set 4	Set 5	Total
12 Sep	Poland	3–0	Bulgaria	25–19	30–28	25–20			80–67
12 Sep	Russia	2–3	France	18–25	22–25	27–25	25–15	15–17	107–107

=== 3rd place ===
Date		Score		Set 1	Set 2	Set 3	Set 4	Set 5	Total
13 Sep	Bulgaria	3–0	Russia	25–18	26–24	25–21			76–63

=== Final ===
Date		Score		Set 1	Set 2	Set 3	Set 4	Set 5	Total
13 Sep	Poland	3–1	France	29–27	25–21	16–25	26–24		96–97

== Final standing ==
Rank	Team
1st place, gold medalist(s)	Poland
2nd place, silver medalist(s)	France
3rd place, bronze medalist(s)	Bulgaria
4	Russia
5	Serbia
6	Germany
7	Netherlands
8	Greece
9	Spain
10	Italy
11	Slovakia
12	Finland
13	Turkey
14	Estonia
15	Slovenia
16	Czech Republic

2009 Men's European champions

Poland
1st title

14–man Roster
Piotr Nowakowski, Piotr Gruszka, Daniel Pliński, Paweł Zagumny, Bartosz Kurek, Jakub Jarosz, Zbigniew Bartman, Marcel Gromadowski, Paweł Woicki, Michał Ruciak, Piotr Gacek, Krzysztof Ignaczak, Michał Bąkiewicz, Marcin Możdżonek
Head coach
Daniel Castellani

== Awards ==
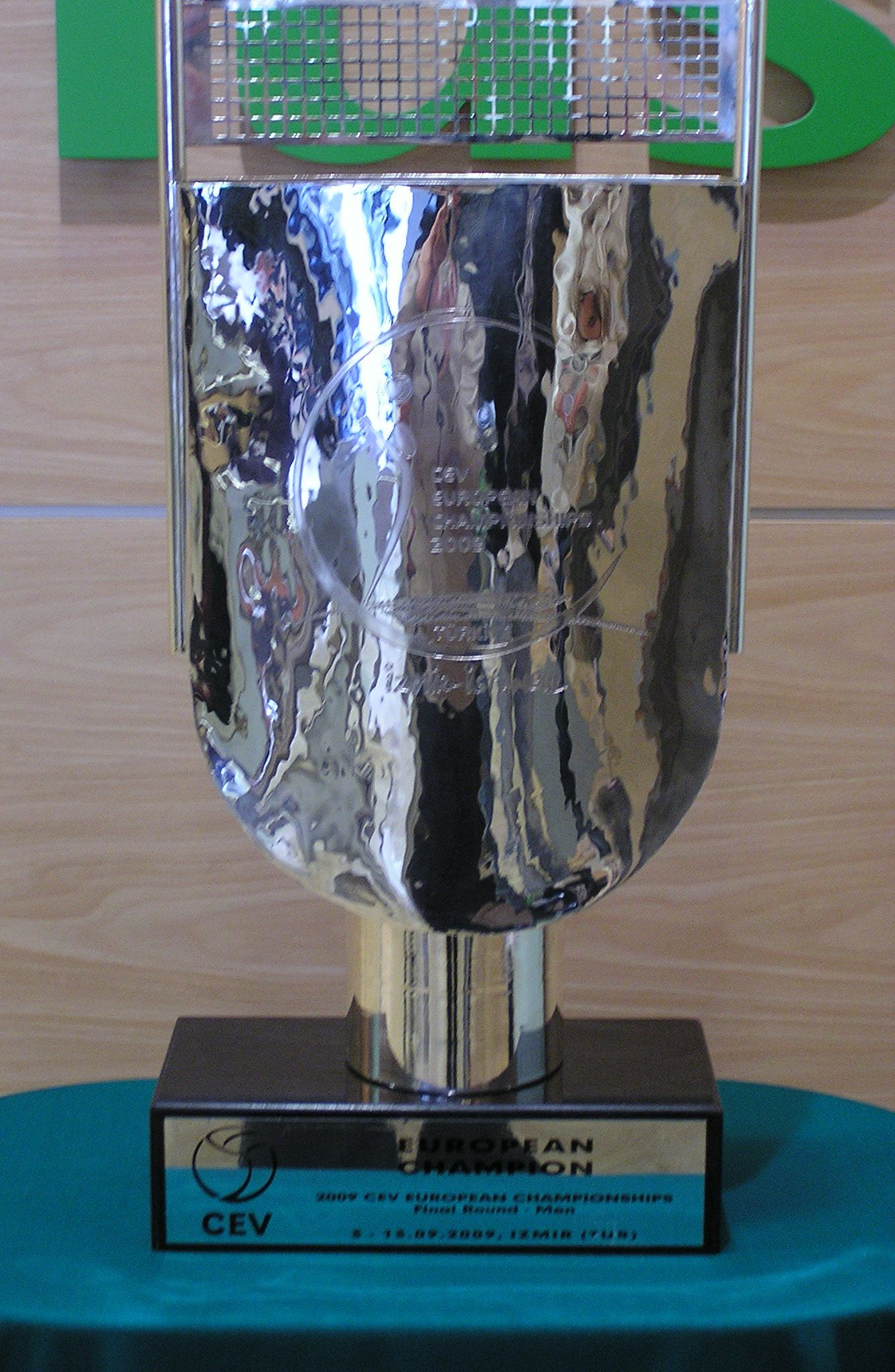
2009 European Volleyball Championship trophy

- Most valuable player
  (Poland) Piotr Gruszka
- Best scorer
  (France) Antonin Rouzier
- Best spiker
  (Russia) Aleksandr Volkov
- Best blocker
  (Bulgaria) Viktor Yosifov
- Best server
  (Russia) Yury Berezhko
- Best setter
  (Poland) Paweł Zagumny
- Best receiver
  (France) Stéphane Antiga
- Best libero
  (France) Hubert Henno
