= Paweł Zagumny =

Polish volleyball player (born 1977)

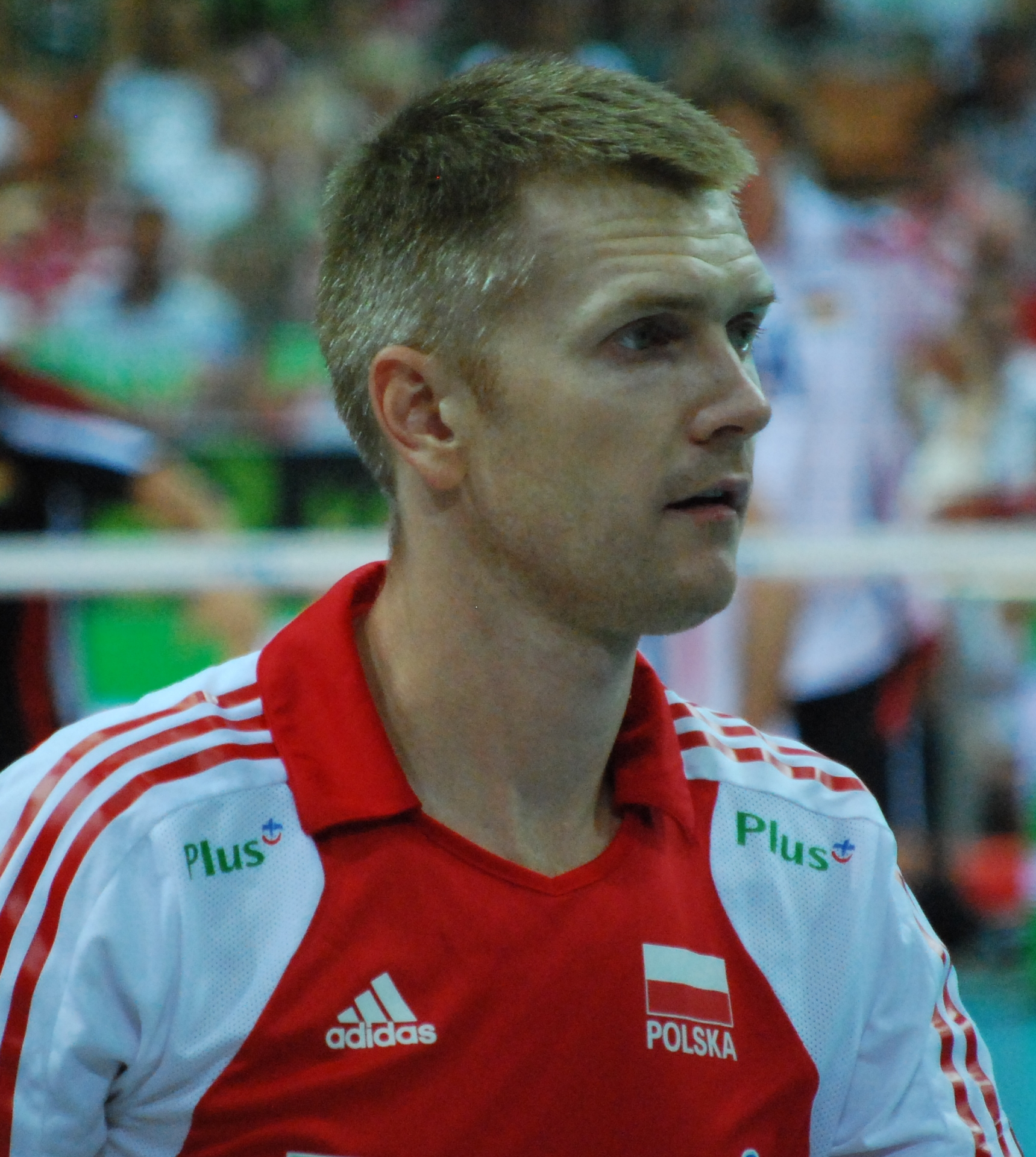
- Zagumny in 2010

Personal information
- Full name: Paweł Lech Zagumny
- Nickname: Guma
- Born: 18 October 1977 (age 49); Jasło, Poland
- Hometown: Warsaw, Poland
- Height: 2.00 m (6 ft 7 in)

Volleyball information
- Position: Setter

Career
Years	Teams
1995–1997; 1997–2000; 2000–2003; 2003–2009; 2009–2010; 2010–2015; 2015–2017	Czarni Radom; Morze Bałtyk Szczecin; Pallavolo Padova; AZS Olsztyn; Panathinaikos; ZAKSA Kędzierzyn-Koźle; AZS Politechnika Warszawska

National team
1996–2014	Poland (427)
Honours
Men's volleyball
Representing Poland
FIVB World Championship
Gold medal – first place	2014 Poland
Silver medal – second place	2006 Japan
FIVB World Cup
Silver medal – second place	2011 Japan
FIVB World League
Gold medal – first place	2012 Sofia
CEV European Championship
Gold medal – first place	2009 Turkey

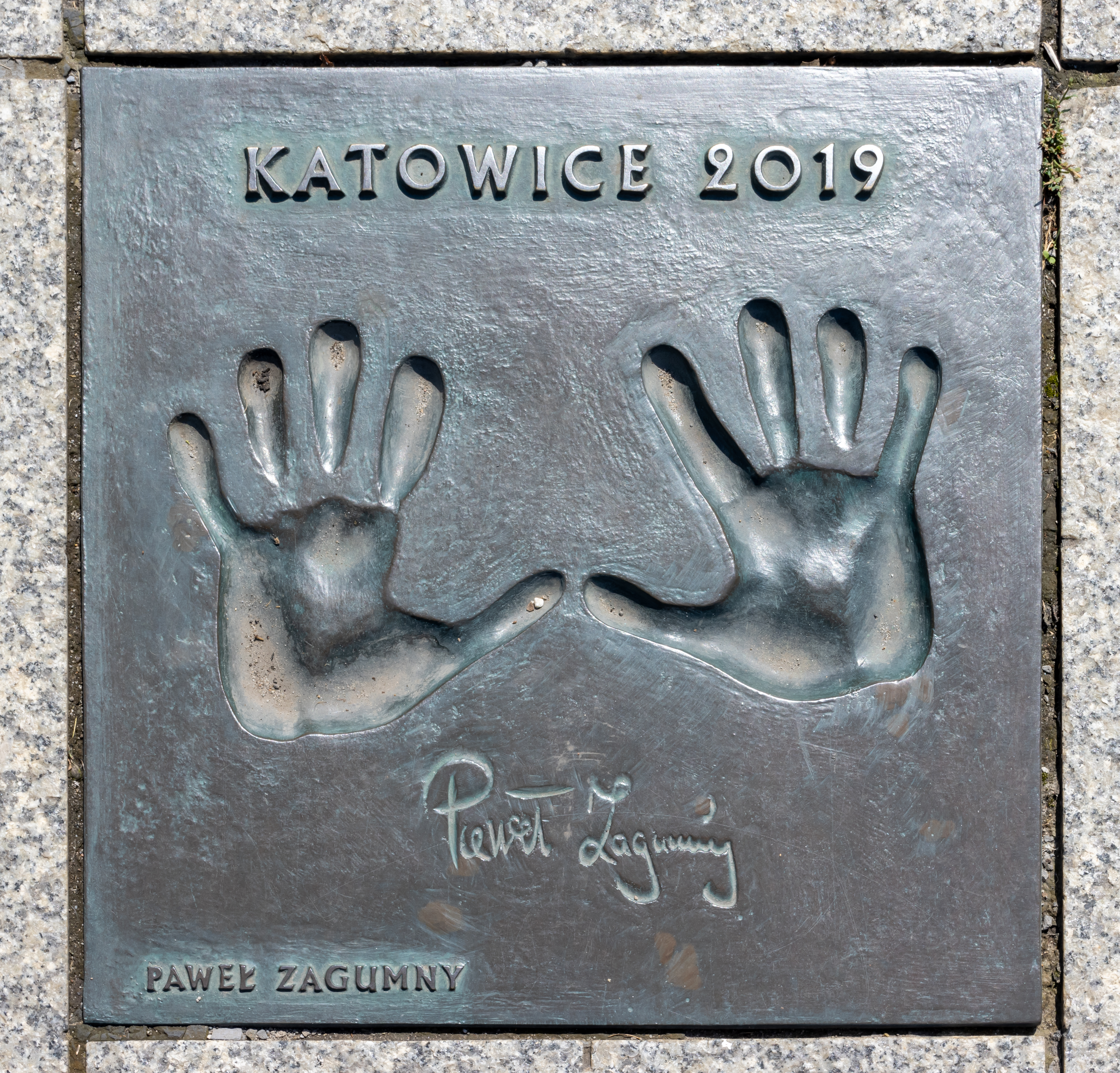
Hand prints and signature at the Avenue of Volleyball Stars, Katowice

Paweł Zagumny [ˈpavɛw zaˈɡumnɨ] (born 18 October 1977) is a Polish former professional volleyball player. Zagumny was a member of the Poland national team from 1996 to 2014 and a participant in 4 Olympic Games (Atlanta 1996, Athens 2004, Beijing 2008, London 2012). During his career, he won the 2014 World Champion title, 2012 World League, and the 2009 European Champion title.

== Personal life ==
Zagumny was born in Jasło, but he grew up in Warsaw, in Ursynów district. He is Hanna and Lech Zagumny's son, his father is a former volleyball player and a coach. Zagumny has a sister, Agnieszka. On 19 July 2003 Zagumny married Oliwia Brochocka-Zagumny. They have two children - a daughter Wiktoria (born 2004) and a son Mikołaj (born 2010).

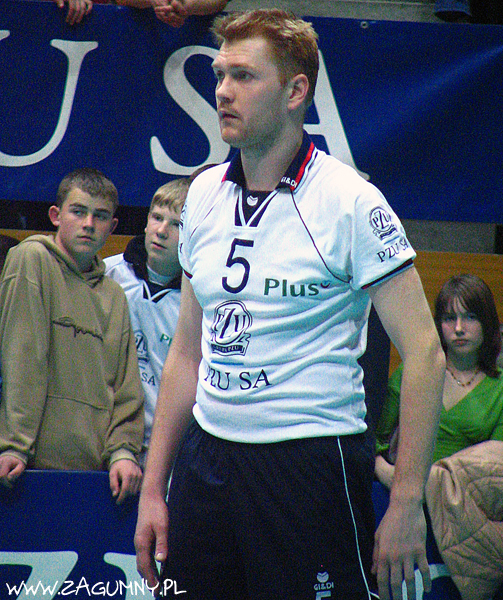
Zagumny as AZS Olsztyn player in the 2005/2006 season.

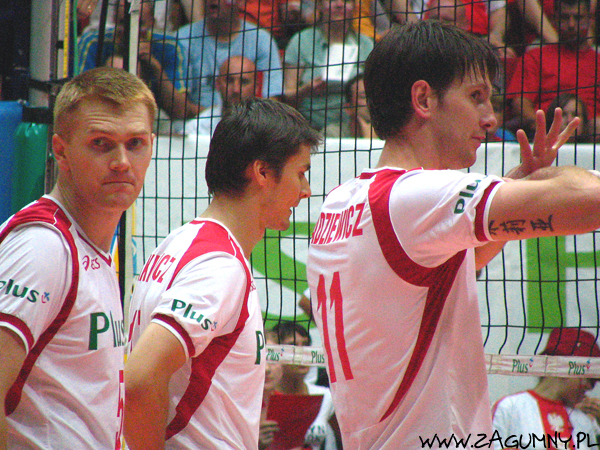
Zagumny with Kadziewicz and Bąkiewicz during the match of Memorial of Hubert Jerzy Wagner in 2006.

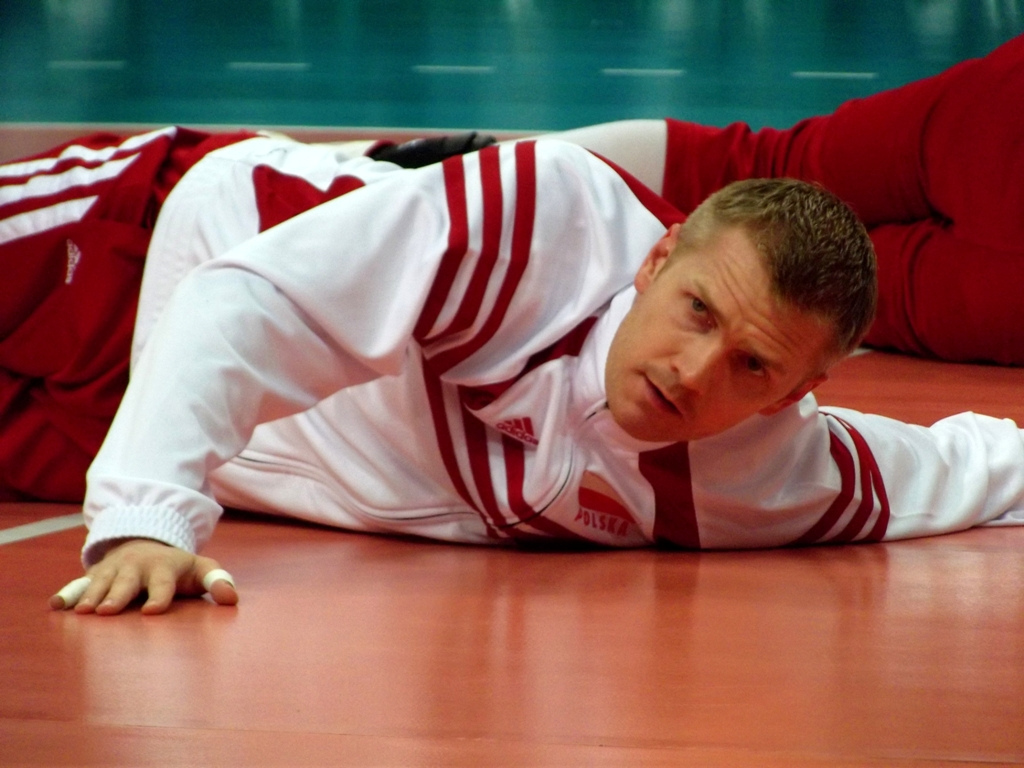
Zagumny before a match of the 2012 World League at Spodek in Katowice.

== Career ==
=== Club ===
He began to play in 1992 with MKS MDK Warsaw volleyball junior club. His talent was quickly seen and in 1995 at age 18 he was transferred to professional team Czarni Radom, where he played for 2 years. With Zagumny Czarni Radom club won Poland Championship in 1996 and got second place in 1997. Next, he played for Bosman Morze Szczecin for 3 years. In 2000 he was transferred to Italian club Edilbasso Padua, where he stayed for three years. Afterwards he came back to Poland, playing for Mlekpol AZS Olsztyn. In 2010 went to Polish club ZAKSA Kędzierzyn-Koźle. He achieved with this club two Polish Cups (2013, 2014) and two silver (2011, 2013) and bronze (2012) medal of Polish Championship. In April 2015 he announced that he is going to leave Kędzierzyn-Koźle. In May 2015 he signed a contract with AZS Politechnika Warszawska.

He ended up club career on 9 April 2017 after the last match of the season 2016–17 as ONICO AZS Politechnika Warszawska player. The official thanks for his club career was held the day before at Torwar Hall with almost 5,000 fans. His shirt number 5 in ONICO AZS Politechnika Warszawska was reserved until 2022.

=== National team ===
In 2006 he was awarded the best setter of FIVB Volleyball Men's World Championship in Japan, where Polish national team won silver medal. In 2007 he was awarded the best setter of FIVB World League in Poland. In 2008 he was awarded the best setter of Summer Olympic Games in Beijing. Zagumny was in the Polish squad when the Polish national team won the gold medal of European Championship 2009, where was awarded Best Setter. On 14 September 2009 he was awarded The Order of Polonia Restituta. The Order was conferred on the following day by the Prime Minister of Poland, Donald Tusk. In 2011 the gained silver medal at World Cup. On 8 July 2012 he won a gold medal of World League 2012 in Sofia, Bulgary. On 21 September 2014 he won a title of World Champion 2014. On 27 October 2014 he received a state award granted by the Polish President Bronisław Komorowski - Officer's Cross of Polonia Restituta for outstanding sports achievements and worldwide promotion of Poland. After winning title of 2014 World Champion he announced that the finale was his last match in national team.

On 11 September 2016 an all-star match was organized in Katowice, which was Zagumny's official farewell to the Polish national team and its supporters (12,000 fans at Spodek). In the match Poland vs. the Rest of world took part the most titled and the best players in the history of Polish and world volleyball. Zagumny played 427 matches in the Polish national team.

== Honours ==
=== Club ===
- CEV Cup
  - 2010–11 – with ZAKSA Kędzierzyn-Koźle
- Domestic
  - 1997–98 Polish Championship, with Morze Bałtyk Szczecin
  - 2003–04 Polish Championship, with AZS Olsztyn
  - 2004–05 Polish Championship, with AZS Olsztyn
  - 2009–10 Greek Cup, with Panathinaikos
  - 2009–10 Greek Championship, with Panathinaikos
  - 2010–11 Polish Championship, with ZAKSA Kędzierzyn-Koźle
  - 2012–13 Polish Cup, with ZAKSA Kędzierzyn-Koźle
  - 2012–13 Polish Championship, with ZAKSA Kędzierzyn-Koźle
  - 2013–14 Polish Cup, with ZAKSA Kędzierzyn-Koźle

=== Youth national team ===
- 1996 CEV U21 European Championship
- 1997 FIVB U21 World Championship

=== Individual awards ===
- 2006: FIVB World Championship – Best setter
- 2007: FIVB World League – Best setter
- 2008: Olympic Games – Best setter
- 2009: Polish Cup – Best setter
- 2009: CEV European Championship – Best setter
- 2011: Polish Cup – Best setter
- 2013: Polish Cup – Best setter
- 2014: Polish Cup – Most valuable player

=== State awards ===
- 2006: Gold Cross of Merit
- 2009: Knight's Cross of Polonia Restituta
- 2014: Officer's Cross of Polonia Restituta

Awards
Preceded by (Federal Republic of Yugoslavia) Nikola Grbić	Best Setter of FIVB World Championship; 2006	Succeeded by (Serbia) Nikola Grbić
Preceded by (Bulgaria) Andrey Zhekov	Best Setter of FIVB World League; 2007	Succeeded by (United States) Lloy Ball
Preceded by (Brazil) Ricardo Garcia	Best Setter of Olympic Games; Beijing 2008	Succeeded by (Bulgaria) Georgi Bratoev
Preceded by (Russia) Vadim Khamuttskikh	Best Setter of CEV European Championship; 2009	Succeeded by (Italy) Dragan Travica
