= Jaros (surname) =

Jaros is a surname. Notable people with the surname include:

- Alois Jaros (1930–2007), Austrian footballer
- François Jaros (born 1985), Canadian film and television director
- Jarosław Jaros (born 1978), Polish cabaret actor
- Mike Jaros (born 1944), American politician
- Patrik Jaros (born 1967), German chef
- Ralf Jaros (born 1965), German triple jumper
- Stanisław Jaros (1932–1963), Polish assassin
- Tony Jaros (1920–1995), American basketball player

== See also ==
- Jaroš, Jarosz, Jarosch, Yarosh, related surnames
