= Jaros =

Jaros or Jaroš may refer to:

== People ==
- Jaroš Griemiller, 16th-century Czech alchemist
- Jaros (surname)
- Jaroš (surname)

== Other ==
- Japan Resources Observation System Organization (JAROS), a Japanese satellite observation foundation

== See also ==
- Jarosch
