= Jarosz =

Jarosz is a Polish surname of several possible origins: from the adjective 'jary' with several meanings, from the word jarosz for 'vegetarian', as well as a diminutive from a number of Slavic names starting with the stem Jar-: Jarogniew, Jaromir, Jarosław. Variants: Jerosz, Jirosz - photetic variants, Jarosch - under the influence of German orthography. Notable people with the surname include:

- Elżbieta Jarosz (born 1971), Polish long-distance runner
- Hieronim Jarosz Sieniawski (c. 1516–1579), Polish noble
- Jakub Jarosz (born 1987), Polish volleyball player
- Łukasz Jarosz (born 1979), Polish kickboxer
- Maciej Jarosz (born 1959), Polish volleyball player
- Sarah Jarosz (born 1991), American singer
- Teddy Yarosz, earlier Jarosz (1910–1974), American boxer

== See also ==
- Yarosh
- Jaroš
- Jaros
- Jarosch
