= Kollar =

Kollar or Kollár is a surname derived from Proto-Slavic *kolarь ("wheelwright"). It is a cognate of Kolar (Slovene, Croatian), Kolář (Czech), Kolár (Slovak), and Kolarz (Polish).

== People ==
- Adam František Kollár (1718–1783), Slovak historian
- Andrej Kollár, multiple people
- Bill Kollar (born 1952), American football coach
- Boris Kollár (born 1965), Slovak politician
- Colleen Kollar-Kotelly (born 1943), American judge
- Daniel Kollar (born 1994), Finnish footballer
- David Kollar (born 1983), Slovak musician
- Dmitrij Kollars (born 1999), German chess grandmaster
- Helmut Kollars (born 1968), Austrian illustrator
- Igor Kollár (born 1965), Slovak athlete
- Ján Kollár (1793–1852), Slovak writer
- János Kollár (born 1956), Hungarian mathematician
- Kinga Kollár (born 1978), Hungarian politician
- Kristóf Kollár (born 2001), Hungarian canoeist
- Laszlo Peter Kollar (1926–2000), Australian architect
- Martin Kollár (born 1971), Slovak photographer
- Miklós Kollár (born 1979), Hungarian swimmer
- Miroslav Kollár (born 1969), Slovak politician
- Péter Kollár (1855–1908), Slovene writer
- Pina Kollars (born 1970), Austrian singer
- Roman Kollar (born 1974), Slovak wrestler
- Sebastian Kollar (born 1987), Swiss footballer
- Tomas Kollar (born 1982), Swedish ice hockey player
- Vincenz Kollar (1797–1860), Austrian entomologist
- Zsolt Kollár (born 1979), Hungarian footballer

== See also ==
- Kolář
- Kolar
- Kohler
