= Kolar (surname) =

Origin
- Language: Proto-Slavic
- Derivation: kolarь
- Meaning: Wheelwright

Other names
- Variant forms: Kolár, Kolář

Kolar, Kolár (feminine: Kolárová) and Kolář (feminine: Kolářová) are surnames derived from the Proto-Slavic word kolarь, which translates to wheelwright. It is common across Europe, specifically among Slavic people. In Central Europe, the surname is commonly found among Czechs and Slovaks, while in Southeast Europe, it is found among Bosniaks, Croats, and Slovenes.

== Notable people ==
=== Kolar ===
- Barbara Kolar (born 1970), Croatian actress, television and radio presenter
- Charlie Kolar (born 1999), American football player
- Drago Kolar (1932–2000), Slovenian academic
- Eddie Kolar (1909–1988), American basketball player
- Evzen Kolar (1950–2017), Czech film producer
- Jasna Kolar-Merdan (born 1956), Bosnian handball player
- Katarina Kolar (born 1989), Croatian footballer
- Marko Kolar (born 1995), Croatian footballer
- Markus Kolar (born 1984), Austrian handball player
- Mary Kolar (born 1958), American military officer and politician
- Nastja Kolar (born 1994), Slovenian tennis player
- Otto Kolar (1911–1995), American basketball player, brother of Eddie
- Robert Kolar (born 1966), Serbian politician
- Slavko Kolar (1891–1963), Croatian writer
- Victor Kolar (1888–1957), American composer and conductor
- Zdenko Kolar (born 1956), Serbian bass guitarist

=== Kolár ===
- Auguste Auspitz-Kolár (1844–1878), Bohemian-born Austrian pianist and composer
- František Jaromír Kolár (1919–1984), Czechoslovak party leader, communist journalist, columnist, and writer
- Jan S. Kolár (1896–1973), Czech film director, screenwriter, actor and film historian
- Josef Jiří Kolár (1812–1896), Czech theatrical actor, director, translator and writer
- Ľuboš Kolár (born 1989), Slovak football player

=== Kolář ===
- Anna Kolářová (swimmer) (born 1997), Czech swimmer
- Běla Kolářová (1923–2010), Czech artist and photographer
- Daniel Kolář (born 1985), Czech footballer
- Daniela Kolářová (born 1946), Czech actress
- Jarek Kolář (born 1977), Czech videogame designer
- Jiří Kolář (1914–2002), Czech poet, writer, painter and translator
- Karel Kolář (1955–2017), Czech runner
- Luboš Kolář (1929–2012), Czech basketball player
- Martin Kolář (born 1983), Czech footballer
- Oldřich Kolář (1898–unknown), Czech cross-country skier
- Ondřej Kolář (footballer) (born 1994), Czech footballer
- Ondřej Kolář (politician) (born 1984), Czech politician
- Petr Kolář (born 1962), Czech politician
- Radomír Kolář (1924–1993), Czech painter and graphic artist
- Stanislav Kolář (1912–2003), Czech table tennis player
- Viktor Kolář (born 1941), Czech photographer
- Zdeněk Kolář (born 1996), Czech tennis player
