= Brabenec =

Brabenec (feminine: Brabencová) is a Czech surname. Brabenec a dialect word for 'ant' (standard Czech: mravenec) and the surname probably originated as a nickname for someone small but hardworking or tireless. Notable people with the surname include:

- Jakub Brabenec (born 2003), Czech ice hockey player
- Jaromír E. Brabenec (born 1934), Czech graphic designer and sculptor
- Josef Brabenec (born 1957), Canadian tennis player
- Kamil Brabenec (basketball) (born 1951), Czech basketball player
- Kamil Brabenec (ice hockey) (born 1976), Czech ice hockey player
- Karl A. Brabenec (born 1979), American politician
- Vratislav Brabenec (born 1943), Czech poet and musician
