= Mary Kolar =

American politician

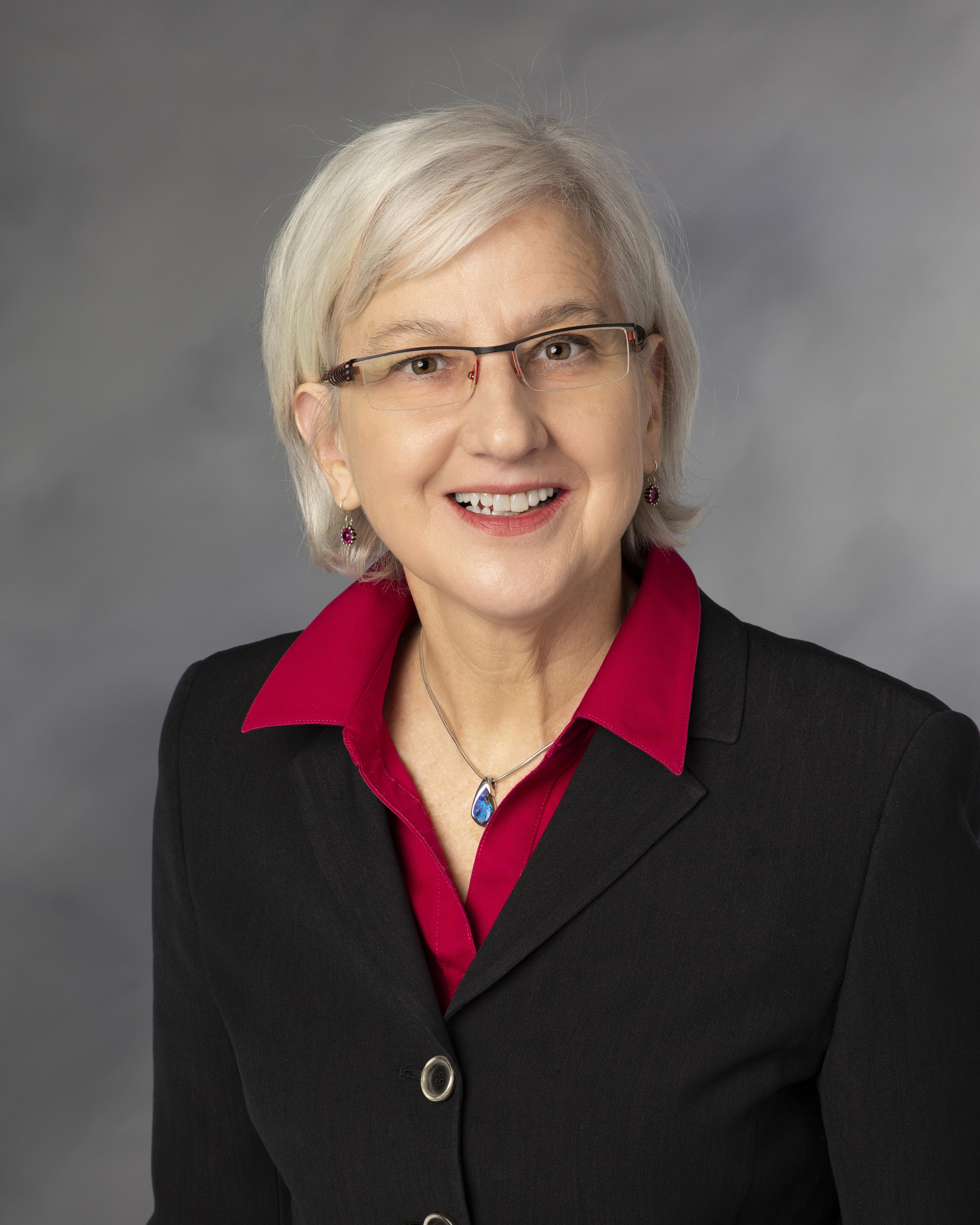
WDVA Secretary Mary M. Kolar

Mary Masters Kolar (born Mary Theresa Masters in 1958) is an American retired military officer and politician who is the Wisconsin Secretary of Veterans Affairs in the Administration of Governor Tony Evers.

== Background and education ==
Secretary Kolar grew up in Wilton, Wisconsin. She earned a Bachelor's Degree in Marketing from the University of Wisconsin–La Crosse, a Master's degree in Adult Education from the University of Rhode Island, and a Master's Degree in National Security and Strategic Studies from the Naval War College.

Secretary Kolar served 28 years on active duty for the United States Navy from 1980 to 2008, retiring with the rank of captain. During her military career, she served in various command and staff positions across the nation, spending much of her time recruiting, training, educating and leading Sailors. Her nearly three decades of service in multiple states including Virginia, Florida, Rhode Island, New York, Illinois, Pennsylvania, and Georgia as well as Washington DC, enabled her to work with diverse groups of people and large organizations with multi-million-dollar budgets. Amongst the most rewarding for Kolar was as executive officer at the Navy's only boot camp witnessing, every week, thousands of recruits begin their Navy careers as Sailors.

Secretary Kolar later worked as the Director of Public Operations for the Madison Museum of Contemporary Art. Kolar has said that of her achievements in life, enabling six formerly homeless veterans to have employment during her time at the Madison Museum of Contemporary Art is one she has been most pleased to have been able to do.

Although her military service in uniform concluded in 2008, Secretary Kolar continued to serve Wisconsin's veterans community through membership and leadership of various veteran-focused organizations. She represented downtown Madison on the Dane County Board of Supervisors for six years (2013-2019), and worked extensively with the Dane County Veterans Service Office to ensure that veterans and their families received whatever assistance they needed. Secretary Kolar also oversaw multiple community-based organizations and was the vice president of the Wisconsin Veterans Museum Foundation's Board of Directors.

== Political career ==
Kolar was elected President of the Metropolitan Place Condominium Owners and served from 2009 to 2014.

Kolar served on and was the Chairperson of the Dane County Veterans Service Commission. She was elected to the Dane County, Wisconsin Board of Supervisors in 2013 and served until 2019. She also served three terms on the Wisconsin Counties Association Board of Directors. While on the county board, she served as Chair of the Zoning and Land Regulation Committee, Co-Chair of the City-County Liaison Committee, Vice Chair of the Dane County Housing Authority, Chair of the Healthy Farms Healthy Lakes Task Force, member of the Lakes and Watershed Commission, and member of the Cultural Affairs Commission. Kolar also served as the Vice President of the Wisconsin Veterans Museum Foundation. She continues to serve on the Board of Directors of the Dane County Veterans Treatment Court.

In early 2019, Kolar was appointed by Governor of Wisconsin Tony Evers to serve as his Secretary of Veterans Affairs. She was confirmed by the Wisconsin State Senate in October 2019. As Secretary of the Wisconsin Department of Veterans Affairs (WDVA), Kolar serves as the chief advocate for the more than 350,000 veterans in Wisconsin and their families. She is also responsible for the leadership and management of the WDVA, including strategic and long-range planning initiatives that align with the department's vision. She is the first woman to serve in the role and has worked to expand the state's veterans services and programs to women.

In August 2019, Secretary Kolar was elected District Vice President of the National Association of State Directors of Veterans Affairs.

== Personal ==
Secretary Kolar's grandfather, father, and four brothers all served in the military. She is married to Scott A. Kolar, a former United States Navy officer. The couple have two children.
