= Jarošík =

Jarošík (feminine: Jarošíková) is a Czech surname. It is a diminutive of the name Jaroš. It originated either from the given names like Jaroslav, Jaromír, etc., or from the Czech word jarý, i.e. 'exuberant'. Notable people with the surname include:

- Andrzej Jarosik (1944–2024), Polish footballer
- Jiří Jarošík (born 1977), Czech footballer
- Norman Jarosik, American astrophysicist
