= Ondřej Kolář =

Ondřej Kolář is a Czech name that may refer to:

- Ondřej Kolář (footballer) (born 1994), Czech footballer
- Ondřej Kolář (politician) (born 1984), Czech politician

== See also ==
- Kolář, a surname
- Ondřej, a given name
