= Wisconsin Department of Veterans Affairs =

Wisconsin state government agency responsible for veterans programs

The Wisconsin Department of Veterans Affairs (WDVA) is a governmental agency of the U.S. state of Wisconsin that is responsible for veterans programs. The department is overseen by a secretary who is appointed by the governor after consulting with at least six Wisconsin veterans organizations. The secretary is advised by a nine-member citizen advisory Board of Veterans Affairs. The current Secretary is James Bond.

== History ==
In 1919, the state of Wisconsin issued a wartime bonus to service members who served in World War I. After World War II, the state legislature decided that instead of issuing a wartime bonus, they would create programs to provide a better benefit to the veterans. The Department of Veterans Affairs was created in 1945 to oversee these programs, which included:

- The Grand Army Home (now Wisconsin Veterans Home) in King, Wisconsin
- The Grand Army of the Republic Memorial in the state capitol
- Economic and education assistance
- The Veterans Trust Fund

In 1989, the state legislature authorized the Department of Veterans Affairs to build a new museum dedicated to Wisconsin veterans. The Wisconsin Veterans Museum opened across the street from the state capitol in 1993.

In 2001, the Department of Veterans Affairs opened a new veterans home at Union Grove, Wisconsin.

In 2013, the Department of Veterans Affairs opened a new veterans home at Chippewa Falls, Wisconsin at a cost of $20 million, with the ability to house 72 veterans.

== State veteran cemeteries ==
The Department of Veterans Affairs maintains three veteran cemeteries:

- Northern Wisconsin Veterans Memorial Cemetery is located near Spooner, Wisconsin. The cemetery was officially dedicated on June 10, 2001.
- Central Wisconsin Veterans Memorial Cemetery is located across from the Wisconsin Veterans Home at King. The cemetery was opened in 1888.
- Southern Wisconsin Veterans Memorial Cemetery is located near Union Grove, Wisconsin. The cemetery was officially dedicated on May 31, 1998.
