= Jaromír =

Jaromír is a Czech male given name. It is composed from the old Czech words jaryj ('strong') and mir ('peaceful'). An obsolete version of the name is Jaroměr. The feminine counterpart is Jaromíra. Notable people with the name include:

== Arts ==
- Jaromír E. Brabenec (1934–2024), Czech graphic designer and sculptor
- Jaromír Dulava (born 1960), Czech actor
- Karel Jaromír Erben (1811–1870), Czech writer
- Jaromír Funke (1896–1945), Czech photographer
- Jaromír Hanzlík (born 1948), Czech actor
- Jaromír Krejcar (1895–1950), Czech architect
- Jaromír Nohavica (born 1953), Czech singer and songwriter
- Jaromír Spal (1916–1981), Czech actor
- Jaromír Vejvoda (1902–1988), Czech composer
- Jaromír Weinberger (1896–1967), Czech-American composer
- Jaromír Zápal (1923–1984), Czech illustrator

== Sports ==
- Jaromír Blažek (born 1972), Czech footballer
- Jaromír Bohačík (born 1992), Czech basketball player
- Jaromír Bosák (born 1965), Czech sports commentator and journalist
- Jaromír Čížek (1927–2003), Czech motocross rider
- Jaromír Dragan (born 1963), Slovak ice hockey player
- Jaromír Fausek (born 1938), Czech football referee
- Jaromír Holan (born 1941), Czech ice dancer
- Jaromír Jágr (born 1972), Czech ice hockey player
- Jaromír Ježek (born 1986), Czech judoka
- Jaromír Navrátil (born 1963), Czech footballer
- Jaromír Paciorek (1979–2025), Czech footballer
- Jaromír Plocek (born 1974), Czech footballer
- Jaromír Šindel (born 1959), Czech ice hockey player
- Jaromír Zmrhal (born 1993), Czech footballer

== Other ==
- Jaromír, Bishop of Prague (c. 1030s–1090)
- Jaromír, Duke of Bohemia (?–1038)
- Jaromír Dolanský (1895–1973), Czech politician and economist
- Jaromír Drábek (born 1965), Czech politician
- Jaromír Jermář (born 1956), Czech historian and politician
- Jaromír Kohlíček (1953–2020), Czech politician
- František Jaromír Kolár (1919–1984), Czech journalist and politician
- Jaromír Málek (1943–2023), Czech Egyptologist
- Jaromír Nečas (1888–1945), Czech politician
- Jaromír Šámal (1900–1942), Czech zoologist and entomologist
- Jaromír Štětina (1943–2025), Czech journalist and politician
- Jaromír Tauchen (born 1981), Czech lawyer and historian
