= Yarosh =

Yarosh (Ukrainian: Ярош) is a Ukrainian surname. Related surnames include Jaroš, Jarosz, Jarosch, Yaroshenko, and Yaroshchuk. Notable people with this surname include:

- Anatoliy Yarosh (born 1952), Ukrainian athlete
- Danika Yarosh (born 1998), American actress
- Dmytro Yarosh (born 1971), Ukrainian politician
- Lana Yarosh (born 1983), American computer scientist
- Tetiana Yarosh (born 1984), Ukrainian gymnast
