= Yaroshenko =

Yaroshenko (Ukrainian: Ярошенко, also spelled Yarochenko or Iarochenko) is a Ukrainian last name. It is derived from the Ukrainian first name Yarosh.

== People ==
- Fedir Yaroshenko (born 1949), Ukrainian economist and politician
- Nikolay Yaroshenko (born 1986), Russian triathlete
- Dmitri Yaroshenko (born 1976), Russian biathlete
- Igor Yaroshenko (born 1967), Soviet–Ukrainian ice dancer
- Kostyantyn Yaroshenko (born 1986), Ukrainian footballer
- Nikolai Yaroshenko (1846–1898), Ukrainian painter
- Semen Yaroshenko (1846–1917), mathematician and mayor of Odessa
- Sergey Yaroshenko (born 1977), Ukrainian tennis player
- Valery Yaroshenko (born 1997), Russian footballer
- Yuriy Yaroshenko (born 1961), Soviet-Ukrainian footballer, father of Kostyantyn

== See also ==
- Yeroshenko
