= Yeroshenko =

Yeroshenko is a Ukrainian-language surname, also transliterated as Eroshenko or Erochenko. Notable people with the surname include:

- Vasili Eroshenko (1890–1952), Russian anarchist writer, esperantist, linguist, and teacher
- Vasili Nikolayevich Eroshenko, Soviet counter admiral
- Viktor Eroshenko, Hero of the Soviet Union

== See also ==
- Yaroshenko
