= Bílá Třemešná =

- Municipality
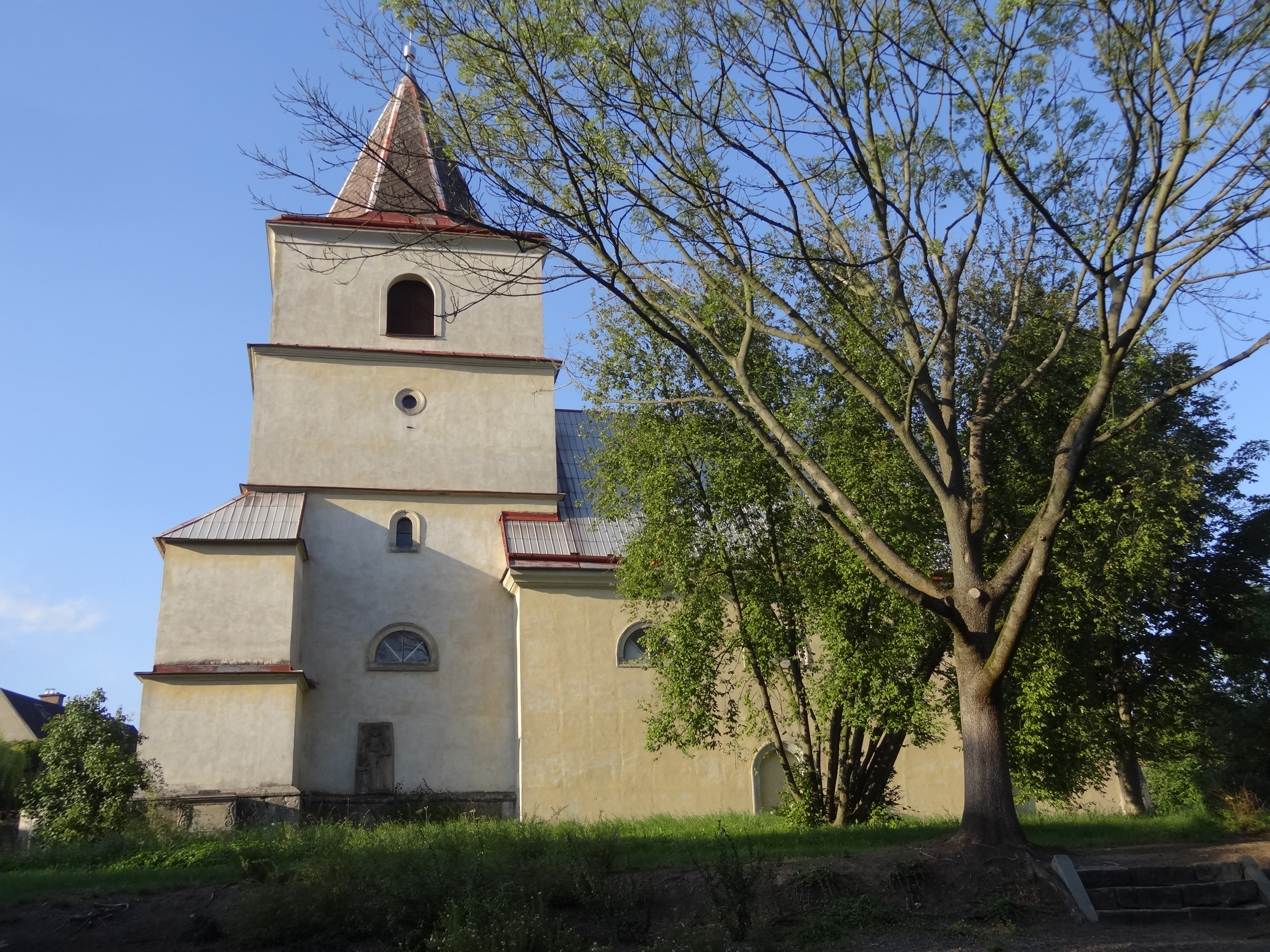
- Church of Saint James the Great

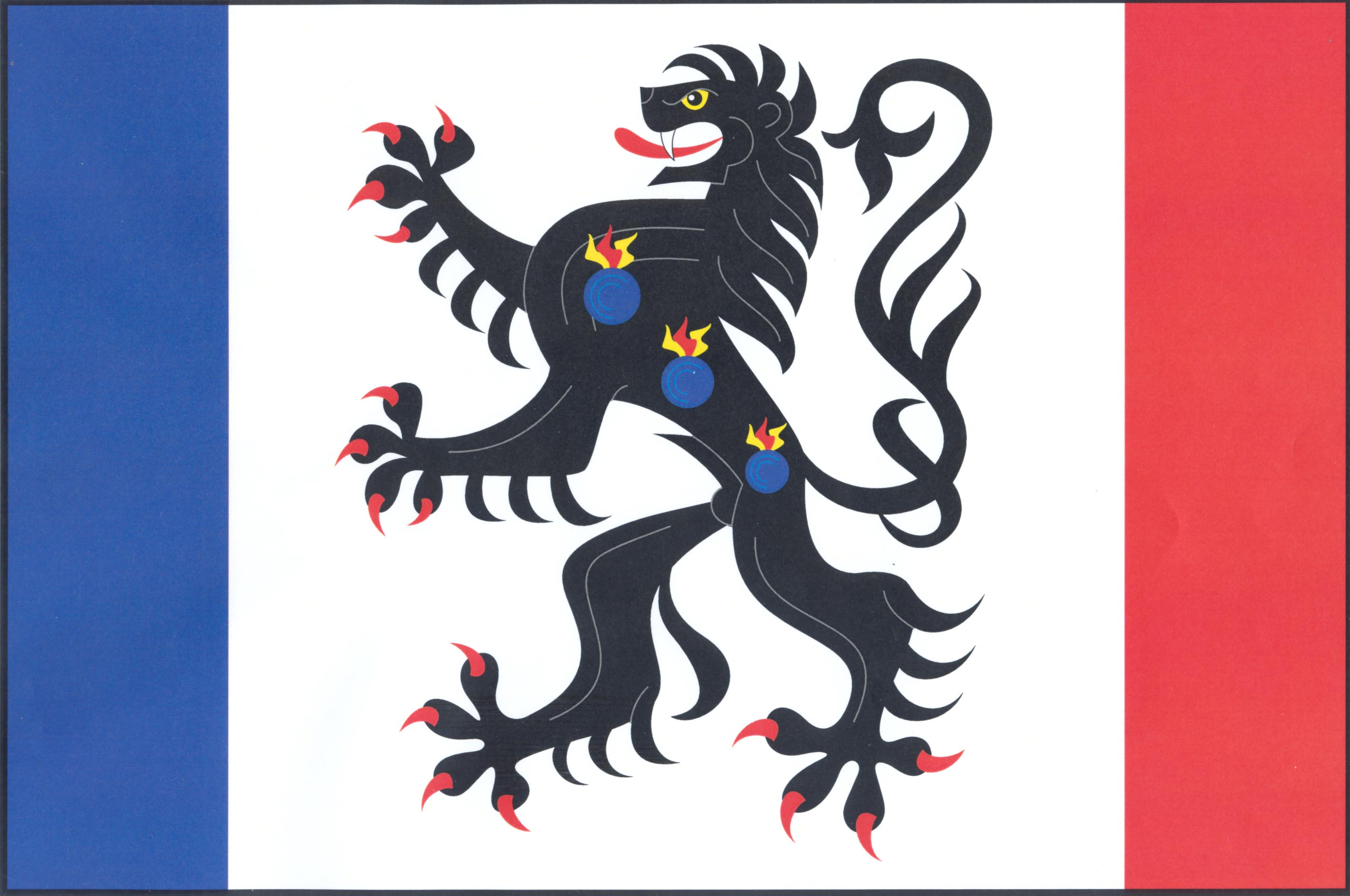
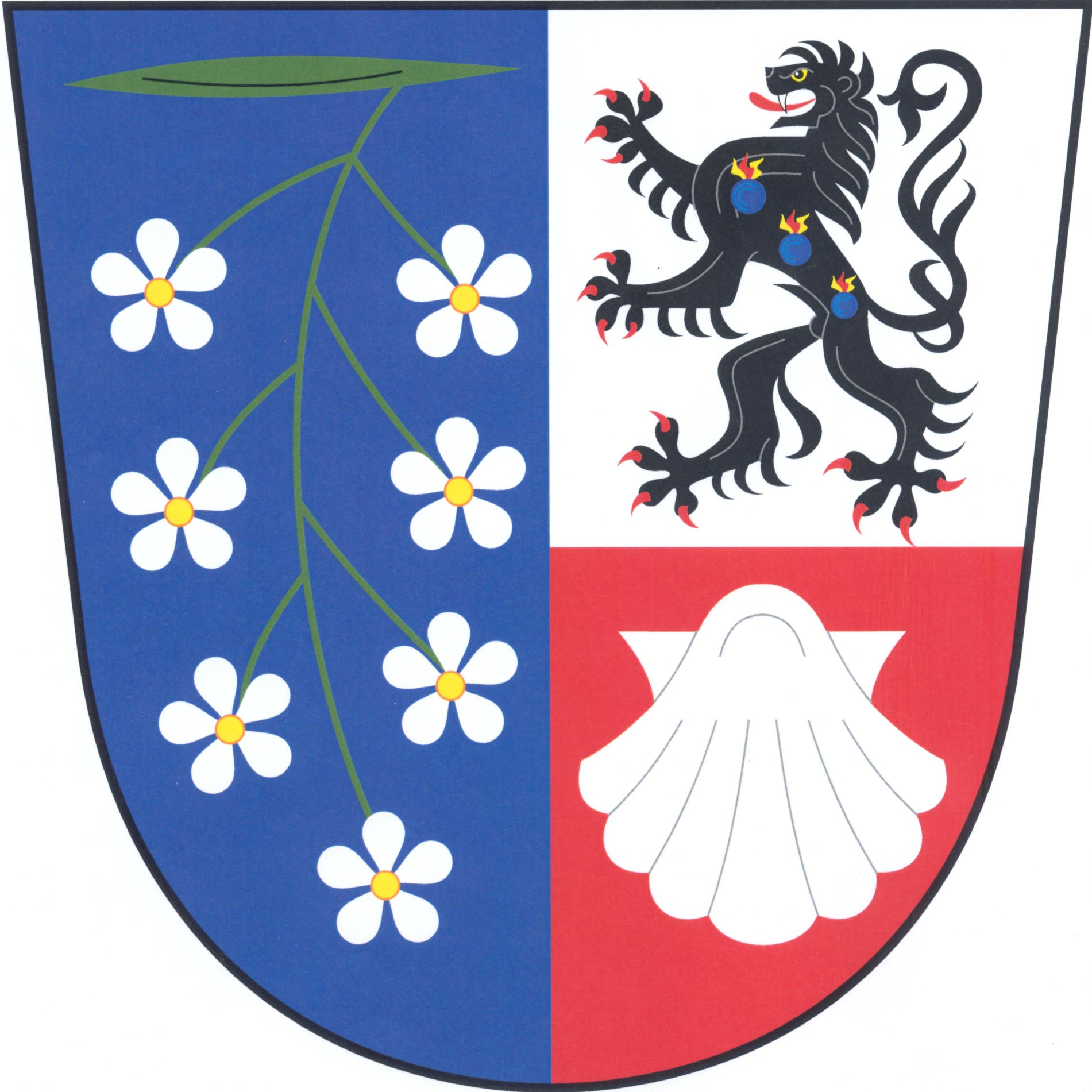
- Flag Coat of arms

- Location in the Czech Republic
- Coordinates: 50°26′41″N 15°44′28″E
- Country: Czech Republic
- Region: Hradec Králové
- District: Trutnov
- First mentioned: 1238

Area
  - Total: 9.92 km^{2} (3.83 sq mi)
- Elevation: 358 m (1,175 ft)

Population (2026-01-01)
  - Total: 1,394
  - Density: 141/km^{2} (364/sq mi)
- Time zone: UTC+1 (CET)
  - Summer (DST): UTC+2 (CEST)
- Postal codes: 544 01, 544 72
- Website: www.bilatremesna.cz

Bílá Třemešná (German: Weiß Tremeschna) is a municipality and village in Trutnov District in the Hradec Králové Region of the Czech Republic. It has about 1,400 inhabitants.

== Administrative division ==
Bílá Třemešná consists of two municipal parts (in brackets population according to the 2021 census):

- Bílá Třemešná (1,133)
- Nové Lesy (179)

== Demographics ==
Historical population
Year	Pop.	±%
1869	1,709	—
1880	1,772	+3.7%
1890	1,682	−5.1%
1900	1,765	+4.9%
1910	2,169	+22.9%
1921	1,772	−18.3%
1930	1,842	+4.0%
1950	1,510	−18.0%
1961	1,466	−2.9%
1970	1,410	−3.8%
1980	1,342	−4.8%
1991	1,217	−9.3%
2001	1,299	+6.7%
2011	1,269	−2.3%
2021	1,312	+3.4%
Source: Censuses

== Notable people ==
- Oldřich Kolář (1898–?), cross-country skier
