= Harry Jarosch =

Austrian slalom canoeist

Medal record

Men's canoe slalom

Representing Austria

World Championships
Bronze medal – third place	1955 Tacen	C-2 team

Harry Jarosch is an Austrian retired slalom canoeist who competed in the mid-to-late 1950s. He won a bronze medal in the C-2 team event at the 1955 ICF Canoe Slalom World Championships in Tacen.
