= Patrik Jaros =

German Michelin star chef and cookbook writer

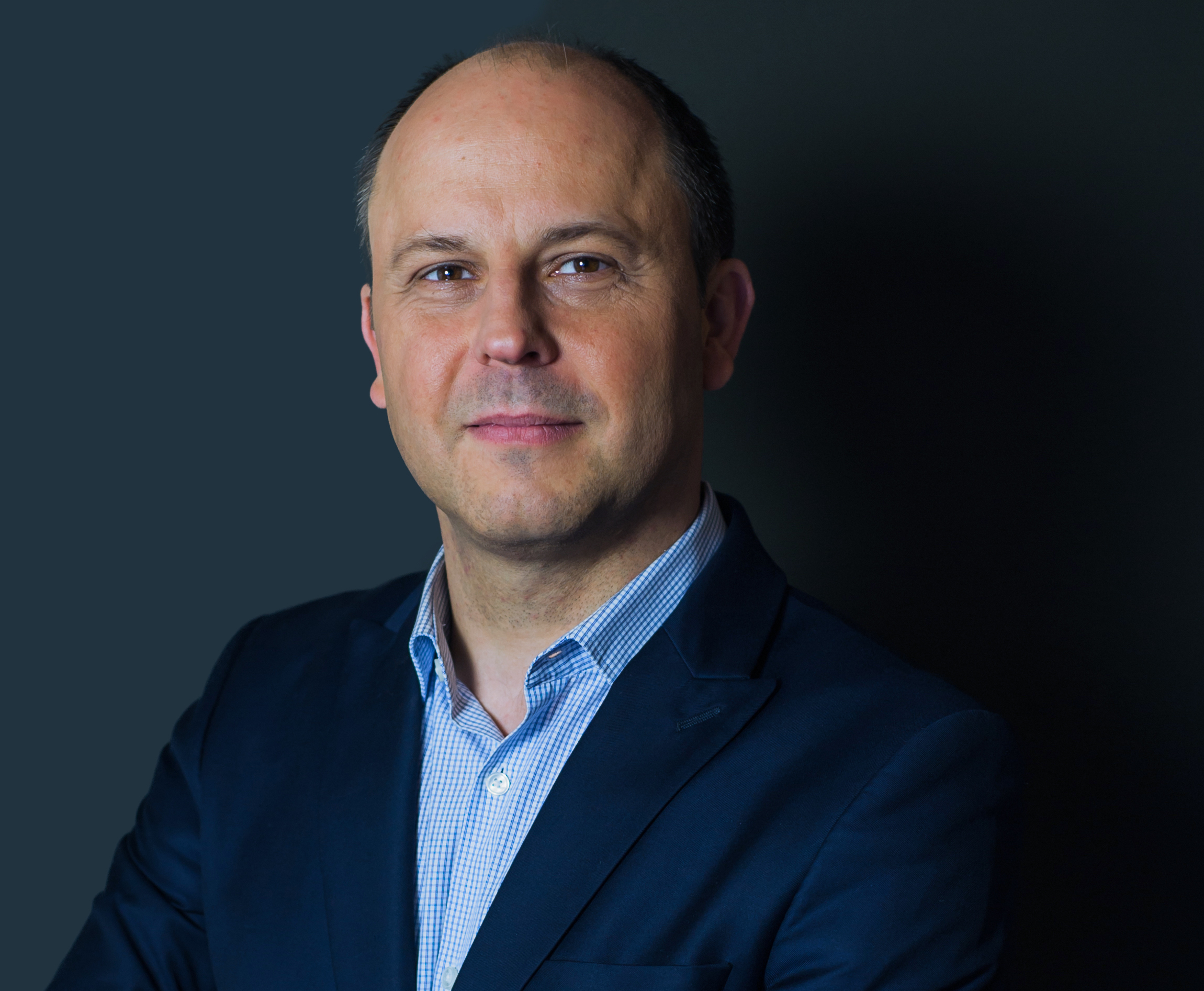
Patrik Jaros, 2013

Patrik Jaros (born 18 March 1967) is a German Michelin-starred chef and cookbook writer who both manages, and is a partner in, numerous restaurants. From 1988 to 1991, Jaros was sous-chef at Eckart Witzigmann's Aubergine restaurant in Munich. In 1992 he was appointed head chef at the Patrizierhof gourmet restaurant near Munich. In 1993, he returned to the Aubergine. In 1994, Jaros was named the youngest Michelin star chef in Germany by the Michelin Guide. In 1995 he was awarded third place in the Bocuse d'Or cooking world championships in Lyon, which is held under the auspices of Paul Bocuse.

Today Jaros manages, and is a partner in, numerous restaurants in Cologne. He works as a consultant developing new food concepts, creates gastronomic training programs and adapts international gastronomic concepts for the German-speaking market. He is the author and food stylist of many cookbooks. Since 2009, he has been developing a digital cookbook as an application for mobile end-user devices. Jaros is member of the Bocuse d'Or Academy in France, and organiser of the 2009 Bocuse d'Or German cooking championships in Cologne.

== Awards ==
- Patrik Jaros was made "Germany's youngest Michelin star chef" in 1994 by the Michelin Guide
- In 1995 he won third prize in the Bocuse d'Or, the chefs' world championships in Lyon.
- For his book on truffles, Jaros received the accolade "winner of the gourmand world cookbook award 2004", "best German cookbook book on a single theme"
