= Daniel Kollar =

Finnish footballer (born 1994)

Personal information
- Date of birth: 29 March 1994 (age 32)
- Position: Goalkeeper

Team information
- Current team: HIFK

Senior career*
Years	Team	Apps	(Gls)
2011–2012	Pallohonka	34	(0)
2012–2014	FC Honka	18	(0)
2013	→ AC Kajaani (loan)	25	(0)
2015	PS Kemi	18	(0)
2016	PK-35 Vantaa	27	(0)
2017	IF Gnistan	13	(0)
2018–	HIFK	31	(0)
- * Club domestic league appearances and goals as of 15:16, 29 November 2019 (UTC)

Daniel Kollar (born 29 March 1994) is a Finnish professional footballer who plays for HIFK, as a goalkeeper. His father is Hungarian, and he also holds Hungarian citizenship.
