= Jakub Jarosz =

Polish volleyball player

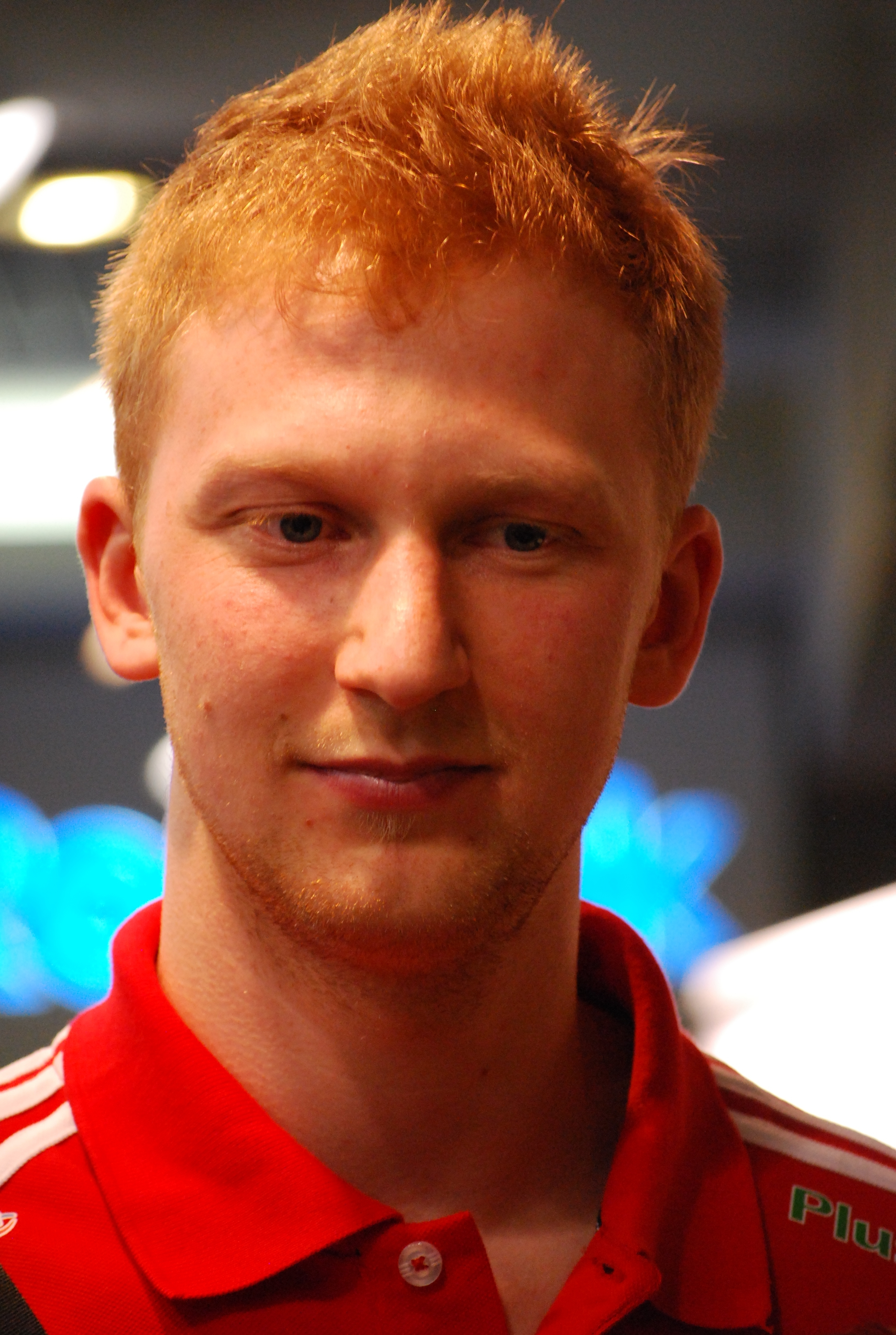

Personal information
- Full name: Jakub Władysław Jarosz
- Nickname: Jarski
- Born: 10 February 1987 (age 39); Nysa, Poland
- Height: 1.97 m (6 ft 6 in)

Volleyball information
- Position: Opposite

Career
Years	Teams
2006–2008; 2008–2009; 2009–2011; 2011–2013; 2013–2014; 2014–2016; 2016–2017; 2017–2019; 2019–2024; 2024–2025	Mostostal Azoty Kędzierzyn-Koźle; Skra Bełchatów; ZAKSA Kędzierzyn-Koźle; Top Volley Latina; Trefl Gdańsk; Transfer Bydgoszcz; El Jaish; Asseco Resovia; GKS Katowice; Trefl Gdańsk

National team
2009–2015	Poland (142)
Honours
Men's volleyball
Representing Poland
FIVB World Cup
Silver medal – second place	2011 Japan
FIVB World League
Gold medal – first place	2012 Sofia
Bronze medal – third place	2011 Gdańsk
CEV European Championship
Gold medal – first place	2009 Turkey
Bronze medal – third place	2011 Austria/Czech Republic

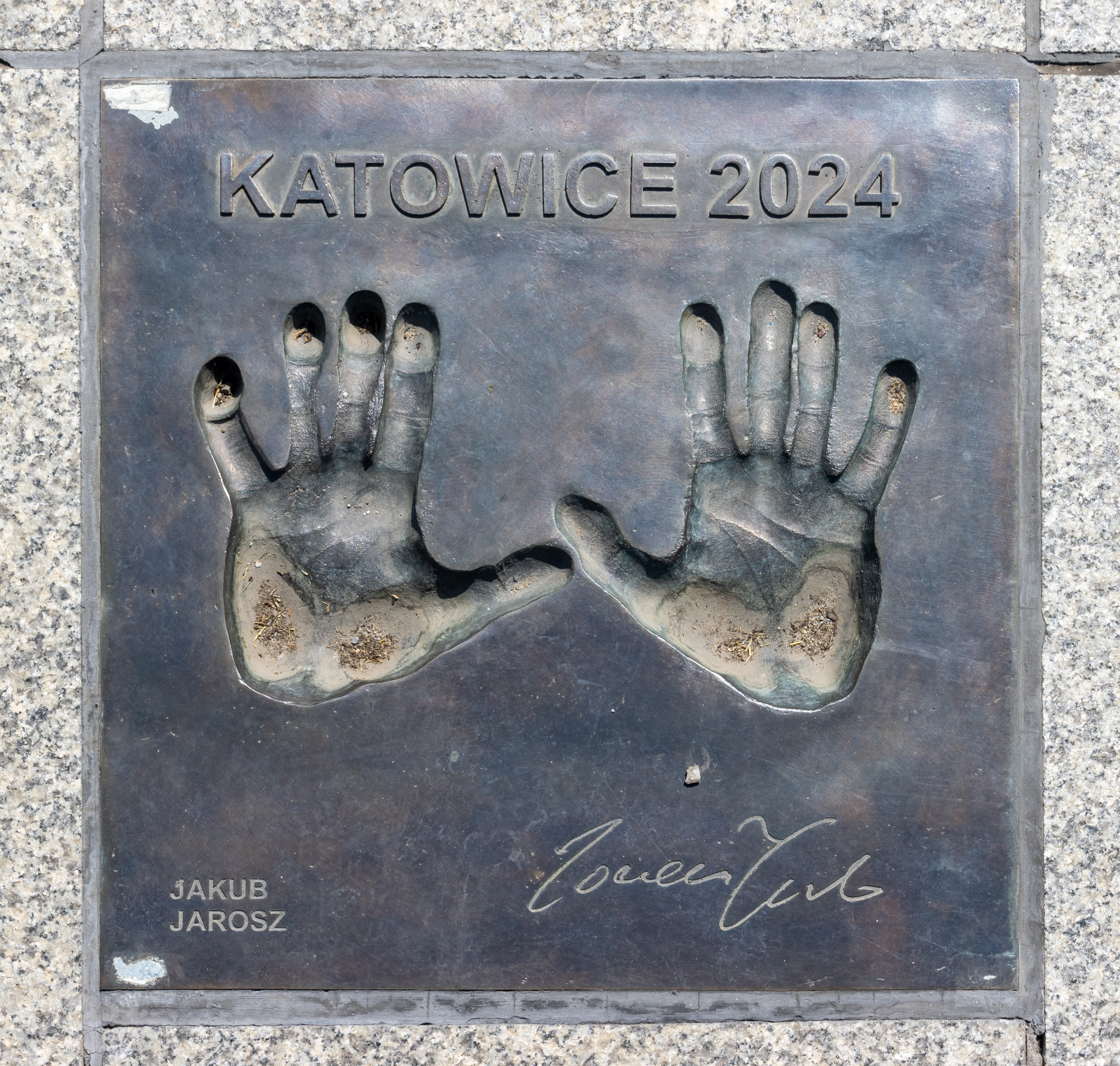
Hand prints and signature at the Avenue of Volleyball Stars, Katowice

Jakub Władysław Jarosz (born 10 February 1987) is a Polish former professional volleyball player. He is a former member of the Poland national team, a participant in the Olympic Games London 2012, 2009 European Champion and the 2012 World League winner.

== Personal life ==
Jakub Jarosz was born in Nysa, Poland. His grandfather and father Maciej are former volleyball player as was his brother, Marcin. On 12 May 2012, he married Agnieszka (née Trzcińska). On 26 August 2013, their first child was born, a son named Kacper. In early 2017, his wife gave birth to their second son, Leon.

== Career ==
=== National team ===
In 2009, he won the European Champion title. On 14 September 2009, he was awarded the Knight's Cross of Polonia Restituta. The Order was conferred on the following day by the Prime Minister of Poland, Donald Tusk. With his national team, he won three medals in 2011 – silver at the 2011 World Cup, bronze at the 2011 World League and the 2011 European Championship. In 2012, he won the 2012 World League gold medal.

== Honours ==
=== Club ===
- CEV Cup
  - 2010–11 – with ZAKSA Kędzierzyn-Koźle
  - 2012–13 – with Andreoli Latina
- Domestic
  - 2008–09 Polish Cup, with PGE Skra Bełchatów
  - 2008–09 Polish Championship, with PGE Skra Bełchatów

=== Youth national team ===
- 2005 CEV U19 European Championship

=== Individual awards ===
- 2005: CEV U19 European Championship – Most valuable player

=== State awards ===
- 2009: Knight's Cross of Polonia Restituta

=== Statistics ===
- 2009–10 PlusLiga – Best scorer (605 points)
- 2009–10 PlusLiga – Best spiker (514 points)
- 2009–10 PlusLiga – Best server (54 aces)
