= Radomír Kolář =

Czech illustrator and painter (1924–1993)

- Born: 19 August 1924; Rakovník, Czechoslovakia
- Died: 5 October 1993 (aged 69); Prague, Czech Republic

Signature
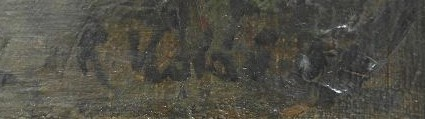

Radomír Kolář (19 August 1924 – 5 October 1993) was a Czech painter, illustrator, graphic artist and art teacher.

== Life ==
He first began painting as a self-taught painter with the basics of drawing by Rudolf Puchold at high school in his hometown of Rakovník.

He graduated in 1943, but due to the closure of the universities by the German occupiers, it was not possible to continue his studies, so he remained at home at the farm until the end of the war. After the war, he studied at the Academy of Fine Arts in Prague until 1950, first with Vratislav Nechleba, and then with Miloslav Holý. He then remained at the academy until 1964, when he left for the Army Art Studio and became a representative of socialist realism in the fine arts. In 1978 he became a Merited Artist and in 1985 a National Artist.

He returned to the academy as professor from 1985 until 1989. He died after a long illness in Prague in 1993.

== Work ==
He devoted himself to painting, drawing, graphics and illustration, and designed postage stamps. Since he grew up in a farm, the subject of his work was mostly animals, especially horses. He also found inspiration in the everyday life of people, in Czech nature and in the national past (especially in the history of the World War II and the liberation). He admired sports and racing, Olympics, footballers and skiers. However, the depiction of animals remained his domain.

He was the author of monumental realizations with tapestry and mosaics, best known of which are his tapestry for the Federal Assembly building (1978), the mosaic for the National Monument at Vítkov in Prague (1960), the Hussites mosaic in the vestibule of the metro station Karlovo náměstí (1983) and several other mosaics in the Prague 10 district (1979–1980).

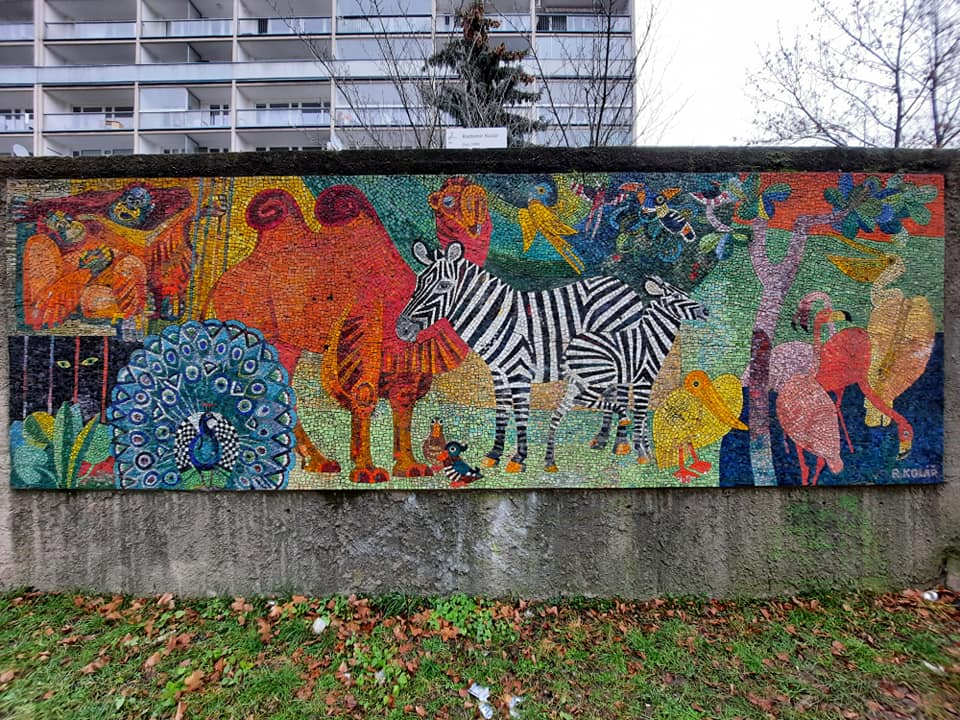
Mosaic Zoo in Prague

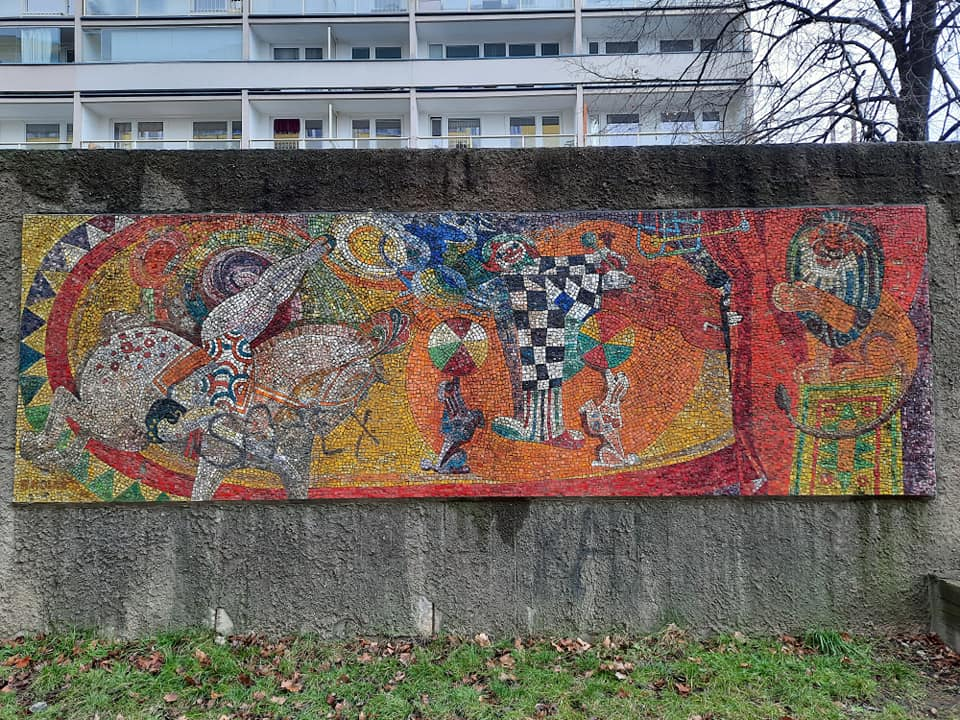
Mosaic Cirkus in Prague

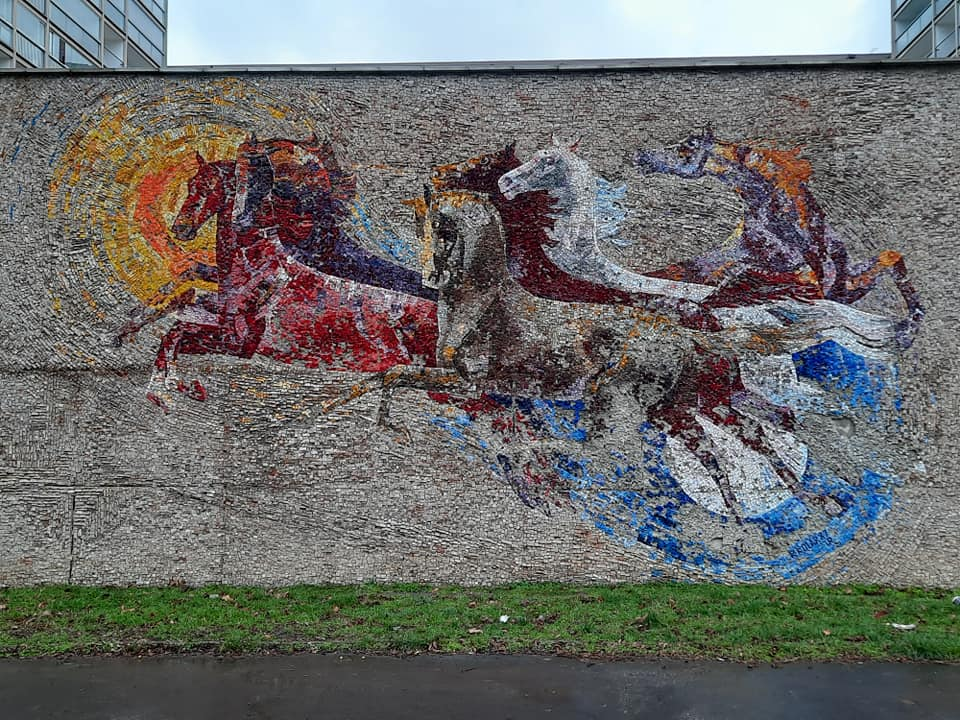
Mosaic "Den a noc" in Prague (1987)

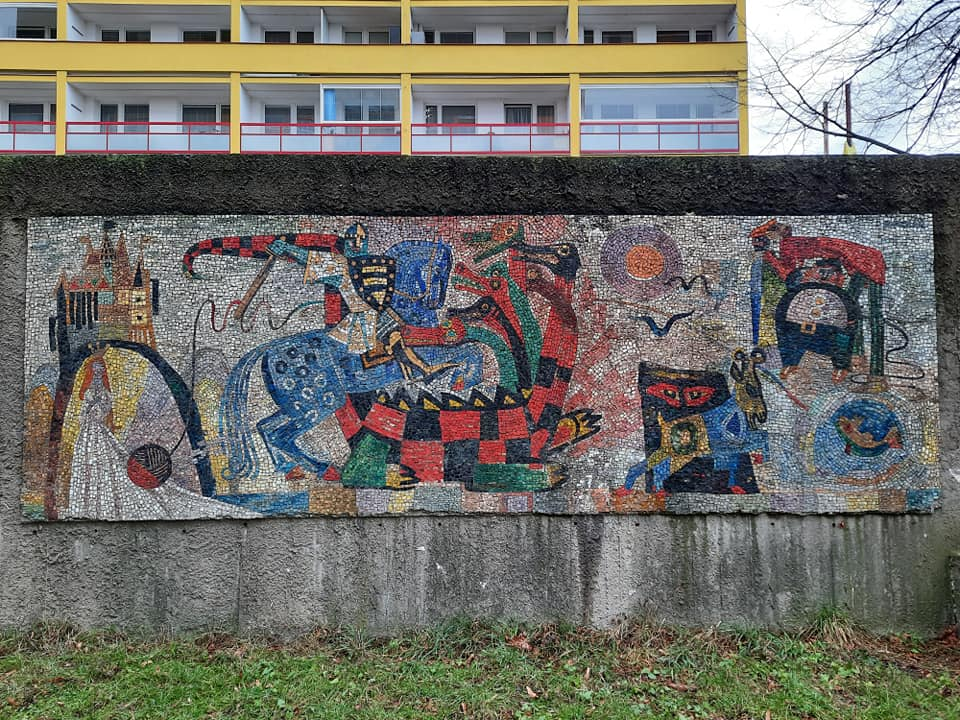
Mosaic from the Czech artist Radomir Kolar called Pohádky a Sluníčko

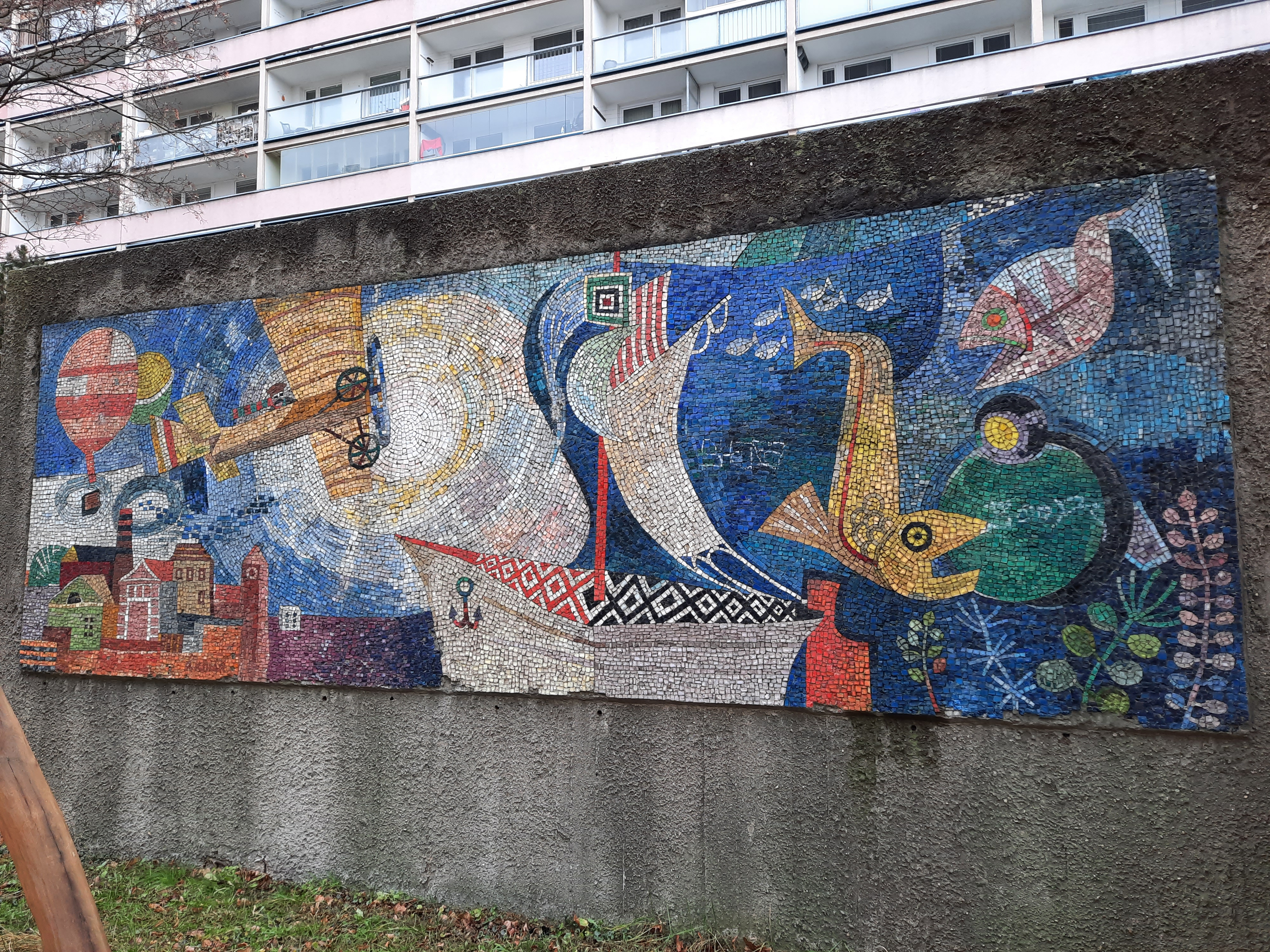
Mosaic by Radomír Kolář - Vývoj techniky a Kompas

He worked as well on illustrations of books and school textbooks, for example books of Jan Neruda, Maxim Gorky and Petr Jilemnický and of the newspaper Mladá fronta DNES. He is the author of several issues of stamps: for the XXIII Olympic Games in Los Angeles in 1984, for the World Cup in Italy in 1990 Italia 90, for the 1994 Winter Olympics, and for the re-opening of the Prague Zoo.

His work is characterized by an expressive realism and the monumental thematic paintings (The cycles of May Day, Horse Racing, Paths of Memories) emphasize a solid composition and expressive monochrome colour. The Horácká Gallery in Nové Město na Moravě has one of his paintings in its collections, entitled Don Quixote.

=== Production ===
- 1960 – Hussite mosaic in the National Monument in Vítkov
- 1966 – Cycle of the 67 Partisans
- 1969 – Cycle of paintings Horse Races
- 1970 – Cycle of paintings Workers' Movement
- 1964, 1968, 1972 – Triptico Sokolovo, Kyiv, Ukraine
- 1970 – Cossack cavalry attack
- 1972 – tapestry for the Federal Assembly building
- 1974 – won a competition proposal for the realization of a monumental painting for the polyclinic in Most

== Awards ==
- 1966 award of the Minister of National Defense of Czechoslovakia
- 1975 medal for the 30th anniversary of liberation of Czechoslovakia

== Recognitions ==
- 1977 – Klement Gottwald State Prize
- 1978 – Merited Artist
- 1983 – Klement Gottwald State Prize
- 1985 – National Artist
