= Maciej Jarosz =

Polish volleyball player and coach

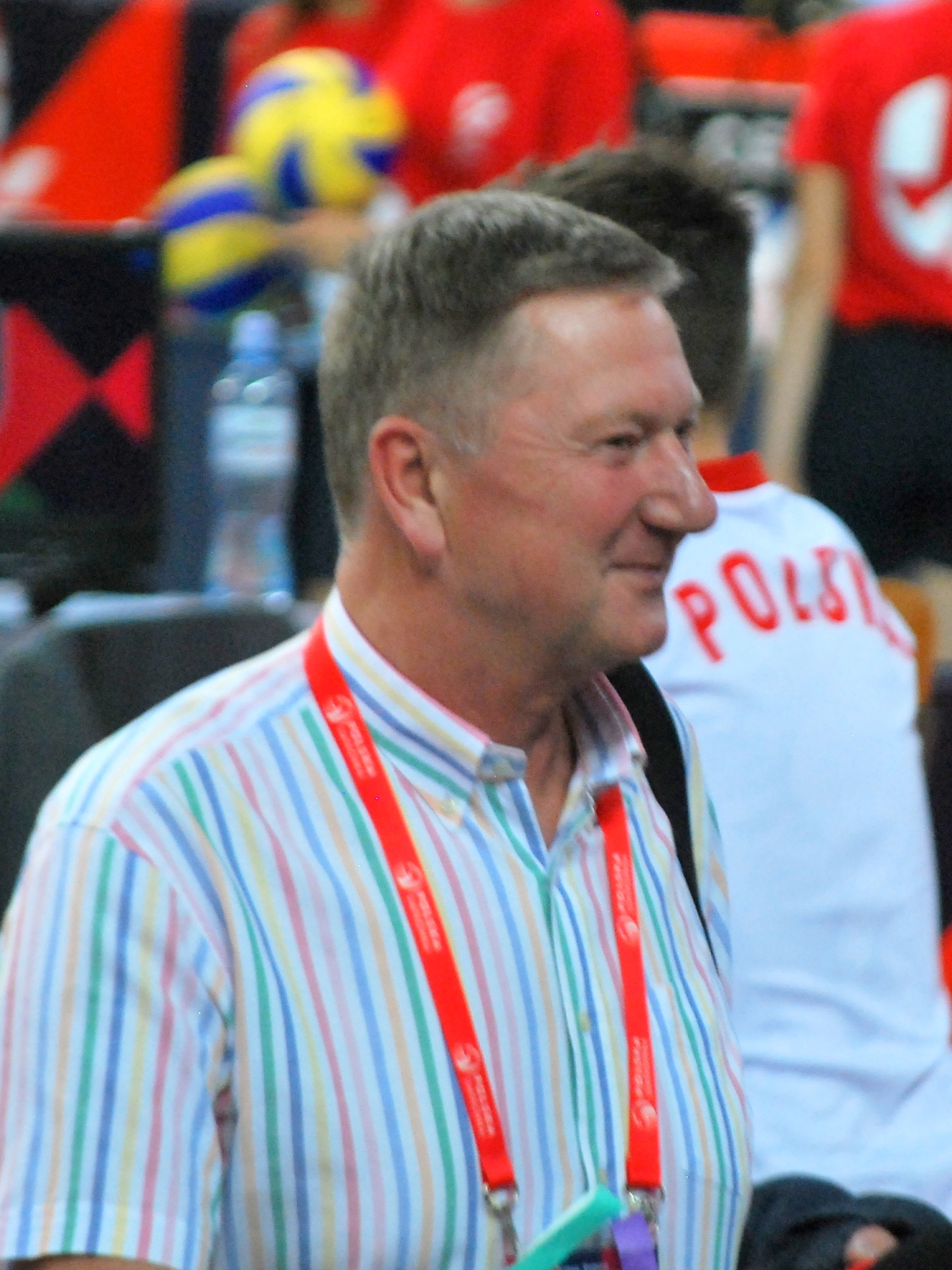

Personal information
- Full name: Maciej Krzysztof Jarosz
- Born: 4 March 1959 (age 67); Wrocław, Poland

Coaching information
Previous teams coached
| Years | Teams |
|---|---|
| 1998–2000 | AZS Częstochowa |

Volleyball information
- Position: Outside hitter

Career
| Years | Teams |
|---|---|
| 1974–1985; 1985–1989; 1989–1991 | Gwardia Wrocław; Stal Nysa; Rembert Torhout |

National team
| Poland |
Honours
Men's volleyball
Representing Poland
CEV European Championship
| Silver medal – second place | 1977 Finland |
| Silver medal – second place | 1979 France |
| Silver medal – second place | 1981 Bulgaria |

Maciej Krzysztof Jarosz (born 4 March 1959) is a Polish former volleyball player and coach. He was a member of the Poland national team and took part in the Olympic Games Moscow 1980. He works as a volleyball commentator.

== Personal life ==
He is the son of Zbigniew Jarosz, a volleyball player who used to play for Gwardia Wrocław, and Maria Ronczewska, multiple Polish swimming champion. His sons, Jakub (born 1987) and Marcin (born 1980), are also volleyball players.

== Honours ==
=== As a player ===
- Domestic
  - 1979–80 Polish Championship, with Gwardia Wrocław
  - 1980–81 Polish Cup, with Gwardia Wrocław
  - 1980–81 Polish Championship, with Gwardia Wrocław
  - 1981–82 Polish Championship, with Gwardia Wrocław
  - 1989–90 Belgian Championship, with Rembert Torhout

=== As a coach ===
- Domestic
  - 1998–99 Polish Championship, with AZS Częstochowa
