= Yaroshchuk =

Yaroshchuk or Yaroschuk (Ukrainian: Ярощук) is a gender-neutral Ukrainian surname. Notable people with the surname include:

- Hanna Ryzhykova (born Yaroshchuk in 1989), Ukrainian sprinter
- Vadim Yaroshchuk (born 1966), Soviet swimmer
