= Jaromír Plocek =

Czech footballer

Personal information
- Date of birth: 14 December 1974 (age 51)
- Place of birth: Czechoslovakia
- Height: 1.73 m (5 ft 8 in)
- Position: Midfielder

Senior career*
Years	Team	Apps	(Gls)
1994–1996	FC Viktoria Plzeň	51	(2)
1997–1998	AFK Atlantic Lázně Bohdaneč	37	(0)
1998–2000	FK Viktoria Žižkov	57	(2)
2001–2007	SK Dynamo České Budějovice	166	(2)
2003	→ MŠK Žilina (loan)	1	(0)

International career
1995	Czech Republic U21	2	(0)
- * Club domestic league appearances and goals

Jaromír Plocek (born 14 December 1974) is a Czech former football player. He played in the top flight of his country, making more than 200 appearances in the Gambrinus liga.
