= Jarosch =

Jarosch is a surname. Found mainly in Germany and Austria, it comes from Czech/Slovak Jaroš, Polish Jarosz, and Ukrainian Yarosh. Notable people with this surname include:

- Harry Jarosch, Austrian canoeist
- Karl Jarosch (born 1931), Austrian footballer
- Nadine Jarosch (born 1995), German gymnast
- Stefan Jarosch (born 1984), German footballer
