= Oldřich Kolář =

Czech cross-country skier

Personal information
- Nationality: Czech
- Born: 21 January 1898; Bílá Třemešná, Bohemia, Austria-Hungary

Sport
- Sport: Cross-country skiing

Oldřich Kolář (born 21 January 1898, date of death unknown) was a Czech cross-country skier. He competed in the men's 50 kilometre event at the 1924 Winter Olympics.
