= Alois Jaros =

Austrian footballer

Personal information
- Date of birth: 15 January 1930
- Date of death: 24 August 2007 (aged 77)

International career
Years	Team	Apps	(Gls)
1957	Austria	1	(0)

Alois Jaros (15 January 1930 – 24 August 2007) was an Austrian footballer. He played in one match for the Austria national football team in 1957.
