= Jaroš (surname) =

Jaroš (feminine: Jarošová) is a Czech and Slovak surname. It originated either from the given names like Jaroslav, Jaromír, etc., or from the Czech word jarý, i.e. 'exuberant'. Related surnames include Jarošík, Jarosz, Jarosch and Yarosh. Notable people with the surname include:

- Christián Jaroš (born 1996), Slovak ice hockey player
- Hana Jarošová (1949–2023), Czech basketball player
- Jan Jaroš (born 1984), Czech speedway rider
- Otakar Jaroš (1912–1943), Czech officer
- Peter Jaroš (born 1940), Slovak writer
- Radek Jaroš (born 1964), Czech mountaineer
- Vítězslav Jaroš (born 2001), Czech footballer
