= Jaromír E. Brabenec =

Czech graphic designer and sculptor (1934–2024)

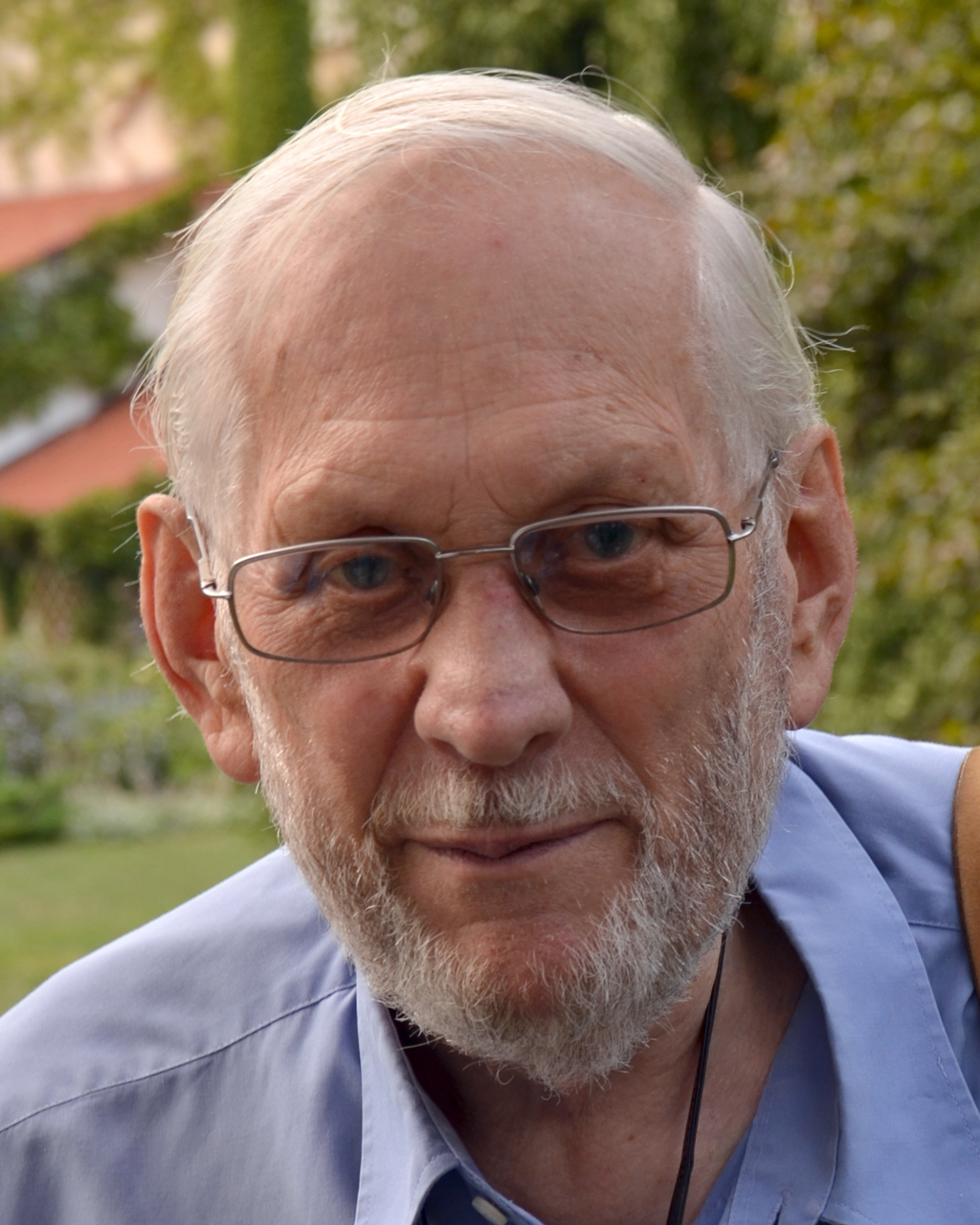
- Brabenec in 2018
- Born: 4 August 1934; Horní Počernice, Czechoslovakia
- Died: October 2024 (aged 90)
- Relatives: Vratislav Brabenec (brother)
- Website: www.jaromir-e-brabenec.cz

Jaromír E. Brabenec (4 August 1934 – October 2024) was a Czech graphic designer and sculptor. He was the older brother of poet and musician Vratislav Brabenec.

== Life and career ==
Brabenec was born in Horní Počernice, now part of Prague, on 4 August 1934. In 1968 he left Czechoslovakia for Sweden. In 1968–1969 he studied at Konstfack in Stockholm. He was teaching at Tollare folkhögskola from 1974 until 1983. He returned to the Czech Republic after the Velvet Revolution.

His first solo exhibition took place in 1964 in Kolín. Since then he has exhibited in Stockholm (several exhibitions), Malmö (1977), Basel (1978), Gothenburg (1979), London (1986) and Nyköping (1993), among other places. His work has been also represented in many group exhibitions.

In 2022, he illustrated Vratislav Brabenec's book Stromečky published by Vršovice2016.

== Death ==
Brabenec died in October 2024, at the age of 90.
