= František Jaromír Kolár =

František Jaromír Kolár (29 May 1919 – 7 September 1984) was a Czechoslovak party leader, communist journalist, columnist and writer.

== Biography ==
Kolár was born into a Jewish family, but as a young man he completely cut off all ties to his Jewish heritage. He devoted his life to communist ideology; at the age of 16, in 1934, he joined the Komsomol. During World War II he was in Great Britain and fought in the foreign Czechoslovak army, but at the same time adhered to the ideals of the upcoming socialist revolution. In 1945 he returned to his homeland and worked as a journalist for the newspaper Rudé právo, and also worked as an economics expert in the Central Committee Commission on National Economy. In the early 1950s, Kolár was accused of adherence to Zionism and sentenced to 15 years in prison; František denied the charges and was eventually acquitted. From 1965 to 1967 he was deputy editor-in-chief, editor-in-chief of Nová svoboda and the weekly Kulturní tvorba, Director of the Lidové nakladatelství publishing house, editor-in-chief of the Praha-Moskva magazine.

Kolár is the author of a number of books against Zionism, Israeli policies and imperialism.

== Family ==
František Jaromír Kolár's wife is Czech writer, playwright and screenwriter Jaromíra Kolárová. Their children were Alena (1946–2005), Vladimír (PhDr., 1947) and Milena (MUDr., 1949–2018). Vladimír became a literary critic.

== Works ==
in Czech

- Zestátnění průmyslu a peněžnictví. 1945
- Dvouletka a její příprava. 1946
- Další znárodnění - smrtelná rána kapitalismu. 1948.
- Únorový skok v našem hospodářství. 1949
- Sionismus a antisemitismus. – Praha : Svoboda, t. Rudé právo, 1970; 88, [3] s.; 8
- Pravda sovětské skutečnosti vyvrací antisovětskou lež. 1971
- Dobrá cesta : 25 let Lidového nakladatelství : 1948–1973. 1973
- Země budoucnosti: vyprávění o sovětské zemi a lidech / Jaromíra Kolárová, František J. Kolár. – Praha : Práce, 1973
- Kahan a hvězda: Ostrava-Donbas / František J. Kolár, Viktor Ivanovič Andrijanov. – Praha: Lidové nakl., 1981. - 247 p., [32] p. of plates.
- Vývoz kontrarevoluce v dějinách a současnosti. Praha : Rudé právo, 1982
- U Dunkerquu za svobodu, v Ruzyni za čest./ František Jaromír Kolár, Vladimír Kolár. Praha : Futura, 2016; 183 stran, 32 nečíslovaných stran obrazových příloh : ilustrace, portréty, faksimile; 22 cm

in English

- Land where dreams come true: impressions of two Czechoslovak journalists about the Soviet Union. / František J. Kolár, Jaromíra Kolárová - Moscow : Publisher: Novosti Press Agency, 1975. - 164 p., [32] p. of plates.
- The export of counter-revolution: past and present. / František Kolar / translated from Russian by Ludmila Lezhneva - Moscow : Progress Publishers, 1986. - 197 p.

in Russian

- Сионизм и антисемитизм : Перевод с чешского - Москва : Прогресс, 1971. - 142 с.; 20 см.
- Экспорт контрреволюции: история и современность : Перевод с чешского А. Д. Петрова. / Франтишек Колар. - Москва : Прогресс, 1983. - 205 с.; 17 см.
- Лампа и звезда : Худож.-докум. очерки о дружбе и сотрудничестве шахтеров Донец. (СССР) и Острав.-Карвин. (ЧССР) угольных бассейнов / Виктор Андриянов, Франтишек Колар. - Донецк : Донбас, 1984. - 102 с. : 8 л. ил.; 21 см.; ISBN В пер. (В пер.) : 45 к.
