= Wisconsin Veterans Museum =

Madison based U.S. Military veteran foundation

Coordinates: 43.075003°N 89.386737°W

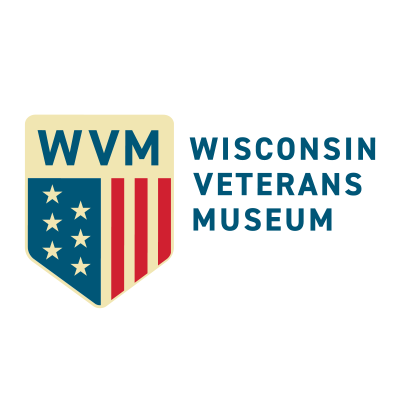

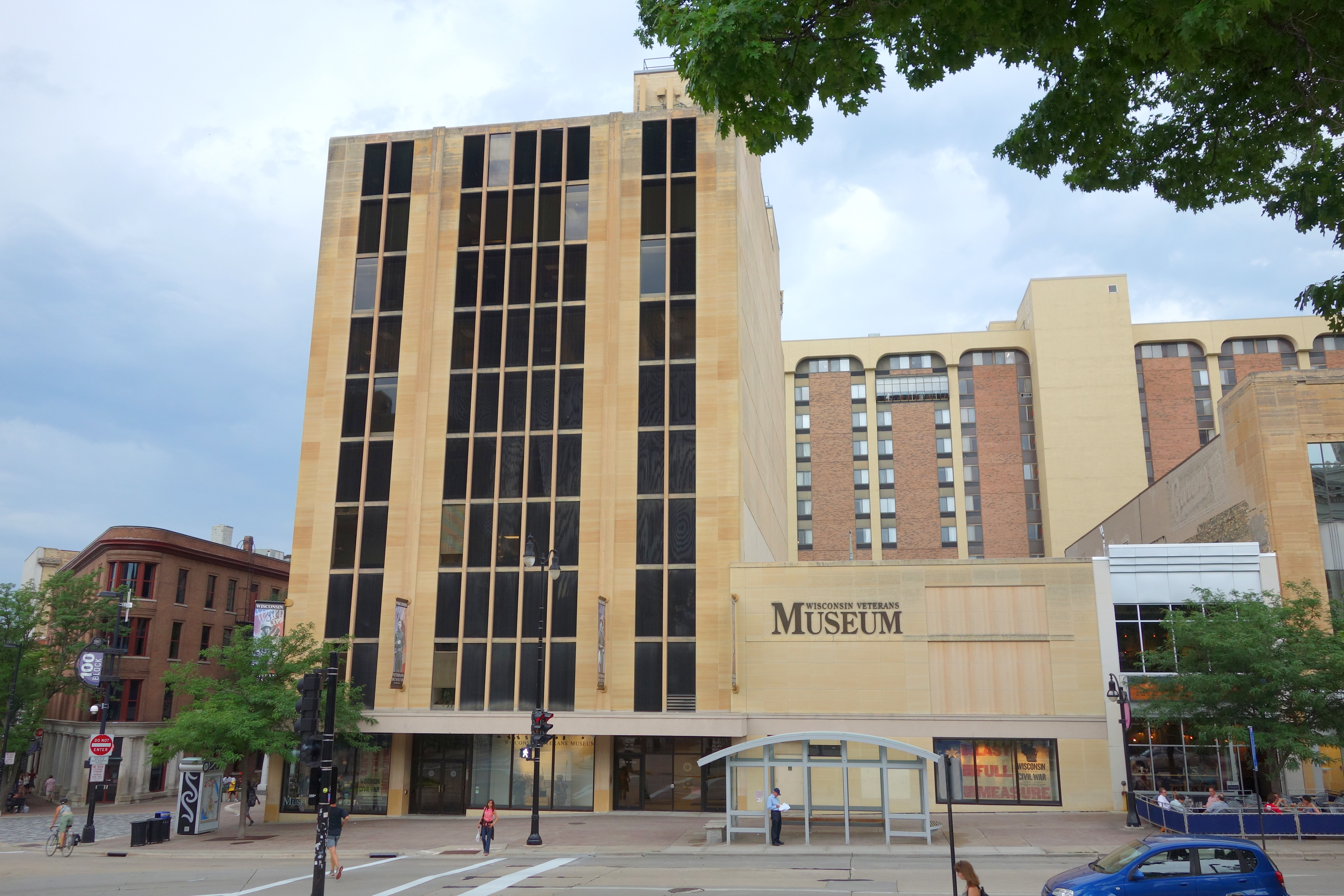
- Established: 1901
- Location: 30 W Mifflin Street, Madison, Wisconsin, U.S.
- Public transit access: Metro Transit
- Website: wisvetsmuseum.com

The Wisconsin Veterans Museum, located on Capitol Square in Madison, Wisconsin, United States, is dedicated to telling the stories of the veterans of the state of Wisconsin.

The museum comprises two galleries that chronicle the history of Wisconsin citizens who served in the U.S. military from the American Civil War to the present day. The Wisconsin Veterans Museum is an educational activity of the Wisconsin Department of Veterans Affairs.

The museum dates to 1901, when it was established as the Grand Army of the Republic Memorial Hall in the Wisconsin State Capitol. That museum and its collections were destroyed in the Capitol fire of 1904, but the G.A.R. Memorial Hall retained a place in the rebuilt Capitol until it moved to its current location in 1993 and was renamed the Wisconsin Veterans Museum.

== Description ==
The 19th-century gallery showcases Wisconsin's involvement in the Civil War. It includes a large diorama depicting the Battle of Antietam.

In the 20th-century gallery, exhibits illustrate Wisconsin veterans' roles in the Mexican Border campaign, the First and Second World Wars and also the Korean, Vietnam, Persian Gulf War and recent conflicts. Three full-scale aircraft, a Sopwith Camel from World War I, a P-51 Mustang from World War II, and a Huey helicopter from the Vietnam War, are displayed in the gallery as well. Additions include Medal of Honor and War on Terror exhibits.

Located at 30 West Mifflin Street in Madison since 1993, the Wisconsin Veterans Museum has been accredited by the American Alliance of Museums since the 1970s and became a Smithsonian Affiliate in 2014.

The museum received funding for a new building in August 2024.
