= 2018 FIVB Men's Volleyball World Championship squads =

This article shows the roster of all participating teams at the 2018 FIVB Men's Volleyball World Championship.

== Pool A ==
=== Argentina ===
The following is the Argentine roster in the 2018 World Championship.

Head coach: Julio Velasco

No.	Name	Date of birth	Height	Weight	Spike	Block	2018–19 club
2	Lisandro Zanotti	4 October 1990	1.95 m (6 ft 5 in)	88 kg (194 lb)	336 cm (132 in)	315 cm (124 in)	(Brazil) Montes Claros
4	Maximiliano Cavanna	2 July 1988	1.88 m (6 ft 2 in)	81 kg (179 lb)	333 cm (131 in)	312 cm (123 in)	(Argentina) UPCN San Juan
6	Cristian Poglajen	14 July 1989	1.95 m (6 ft 5 in)	94 kg (207 lb)	342 cm (135 in)	322 cm (127 in)	(Italy) Ravenna
7	Facundo Conte	25 August 1989	1.97 m (6 ft 6 in)	88 kg (194 lb)	354 cm (139 in)	334 cm (131 in)	(China) Shanghai
8	Agustín Loser	12 October 1997	1.93 m (6 ft 4 in)	77 kg (170 lb)	335 cm (132 in)	310 cm (120 in)	(Argentina) Buenos Aires
10	José Luis González	27 December 1984	2.06 m (6 ft 9 in)	97 kg (214 lb)	350 cm (140 in)	333 cm (131 in)	(France) Ajaccio
11	Sebastián Solé	12 June 1991	2.00 m (6 ft 7 in)	94 kg (207 lb)	362 cm (143 in)	342 cm (135 in)	(Brazil) Taubaté
12	Bruno Lima	4 February 1996	1.98 m (6 ft 6 in)	87 kg (192 lb)	345 cm (136 in)	320 cm (130 in)	(Argentina) UPCN San Juan
14	Pablo Crer	12 June 1989	2.02 m (6 ft 8 in)	85 kg (187 lb)	357 cm (141 in)	337 cm (133 in)	(Argentina) Bolívar
15	Luciano De Cecco (c)	2 June 1988	1.91 m (6 ft 3 in)	98 kg (216 lb)	332 cm (131 in)	315 cm (124 in)	(Italy) Perugia
16	Alexis González	21 July 1981	1.84 m (6 ft 0 in)	85 kg (187 lb)	327 cm (129 in)	310 cm (120 in)	(Argentina) Bolívar
17	Tomás López	12 September 1994	1.86 m (6 ft 1 in)	79 kg (174 lb)	328 cm (129 in)	290 cm (110 in)	(Argentina) Libertad
18	Martín Ramos	26 August 1991	1.97 m (6 ft 6 in)	94 kg (207 lb)	348 cm (137 in)	328 cm (129 in)	(Argentina) UPCN San Juan
22	Ignacio Fernández	7 June 1994	1.77 m (5 ft 10 in)	73 kg (161 lb)	310 cm (120 in)	300 cm (120 in)	(Argentina) Buenos Aires

=== Belgium ===
The following is the Belgian roster in the 2018 World Championship.

Head coach: Andrea Anastasi

No.	Name	Date of birth	Height	Weight	Spike	Block	2018–19 club
1	Bram Van Den Dries	14 August 1989	2.08 m (6 ft 10 in)	99 kg (218 lb)	361 cm (142 in)	325 cm (128 in)	(France) Spacer's Toulouse
2	Hendrik Tuerlinckx	1 December 1987	1.95 m (6 ft 5 in)	86 kg (190 lb)	355 cm (140 in)	321 cm (126 in)	(Belgium) Roeselare
3	Sam Deroo (c)	29 April 1992	2.03 m (6 ft 8 in)	105 kg (231 lb)	355 cm (140 in)	335 cm (132 in)	(Poland) Kędzierzyn-Koźle
4	Stijn D'Hulst	24 April 1991	1.87 m (6 ft 2 in)	75 kg (165 lb)	321 cm (126 in)	305 cm (120 in)	(Germany) Powervolleys Düren
5	Igor Grobelny	8 June 1993	1.94 m (6 ft 4 in)	85 kg (187 lb)	350 cm (140 in)	330 cm (130 in)	(Germany) Unterhaching
6	Lowie Stuer	24 November 1995	1.94 m (6 ft 4 in)	80 kg (180 lb)	331 cm (130 in)	310 cm (120 in)	(Belgium) Menen
7	François Lecat	19 April 1993	2.00 m (6 ft 7 in)	96 kg (212 lb)	347 cm (137 in)	320 cm (130 in)	(Italy) Vibo Valentia
8	Kevin Klinkenberg	4 October 1990	1.97 m (6 ft 6 in)	94 kg (207 lb)	343 cm (135 in)	314 cm (124 in)	(Italy) Milano
9	Pieter Verhees	8 December 1989	2.05 m (6 ft 9 in)	112 kg (247 lb)	365 cm (144 in)	350 cm (140 in)	(Italy) Vibo Valentia
10	Simon Van De Voorde	19 December 1989	2.08 m (6 ft 10 in)	100 kg (220 lb)	338 cm (133 in)	318 cm (125 in)	(Iran) Paykan
14	Jelle Ribbens	17 March 1992	1.85 m (6 ft 1 in)	79 kg (174 lb)	331 cm (130 in)	300 cm (120 in)	(France) Spacer's Toulouse
16	Matthias Valkiers	8 April 1990	1.94 m (6 ft 4 in)	92 kg (203 lb)	339 cm (133 in)	310 cm (120 in)	(France) Tourcoing
17	Tomas Rousseaux	31 March 1994	1.99 m (6 ft 6 in)	90 kg (200 lb)	352 cm (139 in)	317 cm (125 in)	(Poland) Olsztyn
22	Pieter Coolman	24 April 1989	2.00 m (6 ft 7 in)	90 kg (200 lb)	351 cm (138 in)	321 cm (126 in)	(Belgium) Roeselare

=== Dominican Republic ===
The following is the Dominican roster in the 2018 World Championship.

Head coach: Alexander Gutiérrez

No.	Name	Date of birth	Height	Weight	Spike	Block	2018–19 club
1	Henry Tapia	1 March 1992	1.98 m (6 ft 6 in)	88 kg (194 lb)	345 cm (136 in)	335 cm (132 in)	(Dominican Republic) Santiago Rodríguez
2	Bayron Valdez	18 January 1999	1.91 m (6 ft 3 in)	72 kg (159 lb)	252 cm (99 in)	249 cm (98 in)	(Dominican Republic) Bayaguana
3	Elvis Contreras (c)	20 July 1979	1.88 m (6 ft 2 in)	78 kg (172 lb)	365 cm (144 in)	355 cm (140 in)	(Dominican Republic) Tamayo
5	Engel Mieses	1 December 1995	1.71 m (5 ft 7 in)	65 kg (143 lb)	224 cm (88 in)	214 cm (84 in)	(Dominican Republic) Santo Domingo
8	Henry López	9 December 1994	1.85 m (6 ft 1 in)	71 kg (157 lb)	245 cm (96 in)	235 cm (93 in)	(Dominican Republic) Moca
9	Braymar Tolentino	27 August 1996	1.86 m (6 ft 1 in)	80 kg (180 lb)	333 cm (131 in)	323 cm (127 in)	(Dominican Republic) Bayaguana
10	Francisco Abreu López	26 April 1982	1.84 m (6 ft 0 in)	82 kg (181 lb)	351 cm (138 in)	343 cm (135 in)	(Dominican Republic) Distrito Nacional
11	José Miguel Cáceres	24 December 1981	2.10 m (6 ft 11 in)	104 kg (229 lb)	365 cm (144 in)	353 cm (139 in)	(Dominican Republic) Bameso
13	Jonathan Mercedes	18 August 1989	1.87 m (6 ft 2 in)	85 kg (187 lb)	345 cm (136 in)	318 cm (125 in)	(Dominican Republic) San Francisco de Macorís
14	Félix Romero	2 May 1995	1.91 m (6 ft 3 in)	72 kg (159 lb)	352 cm (139 in)	250 cm (98 in)	(Dominican Republic) Bayaguana
15	Richi Paulino	2 December 1996	2.06 m (6 ft 9 in)	87 kg (192 lb)	350 cm (140 in)	330 cm (130 in)	(Dominican Republic) Santiago
16	Adalberto González	31 August 1999	1.85 m (6 ft 1 in)	63 kg (139 lb)	248 cm (98 in)	245 cm (96 in)	(Dominican Republic) Duvergé
17	Jairo Pérez	17 February 1999	1.92 m (6 ft 4 in)	72 kg (159 lb)	252 cm (99 in)	250 cm (98 in)	(Dominican Republic) Barahona
19	Héctor Cruz	12 June 1997	1.87 m (6 ft 2 in)	83 kg (183 lb)	340 cm (130 in)	330 cm (130 in)	(Dominican Republic) Yamasá

=== Italy ===
The following is the Italian roster in the 2018 World Championship.

Head coach: Gianlorenzo Blengini

No.	Name	Date of birth	Height	Weight	Spike	Block	2018–19 club
1	Davide Candellaro	7 June 1989	2.00 m (6 ft 7 in)	88 kg (194 lb)	340 cm (130 in)	320 cm (130 in)	(Italy) Trentino
2	Luigi Randazzo	30 April 1994	1.98 m (6 ft 6 in)	97 kg (214 lb)	352 cm (139 in)	255 cm (100 in)	(Italy) Padova
4	Michele Baranowicz	5 August 1989	1.96 m (6 ft 5 in)	93 kg (205 lb)	350 cm (140 in)	328 cm (129 in)	(Italy) Civitanova
5	Osmany Juantorena	12 August 1985	2.00 m (6 ft 7 in)	85 kg (187 lb)	370 cm (150 in)	340 cm (130 in)	(Italy) Civitanova
6	Simone Giannelli	9 August 1996	1.98 m (6 ft 6 in)	92 kg (203 lb)	350 cm (140 in)	330 cm (130 in)	(Italy) Trentino
7	Salvatore Rossini	13 July 1986	1.85 m (6 ft 1 in)	82 kg (181 lb)	312 cm (123 in)	301 cm (119 in)	(Italy) Modena
8	Daniele Mazzone	4 June 1992	2.08 m (6 ft 10 in)	88 kg (194 lb)	315 cm (124 in)	309 cm (122 in)	(Italy) Modena
9	Ivan Zaytsev (c)	2 October 1988	2.04 m (6 ft 8 in)	100 kg (220 lb)	370 cm (150 in)	355 cm (140 in)	(Italy) Modena
10	Filippo Lanza	3 March 1991	1.98 m (6 ft 6 in)	98 kg (216 lb)	350 cm (140 in)	330 cm (130 in)	(Italy) Perugia
12	Enrico Cester	16 March 1988	2.02 m (6 ft 8 in)	93 kg (205 lb)	336 cm (132 in)	321 cm (126 in)	(Italy) Civitanova
13	Massimo Colaci	21 February 1985	1.80 m (5 ft 11 in)	75 kg (165 lb)	314 cm (124 in)	306 cm (120 in)	(Italy) Perugia
15	Gabriele Maruotti	25 March 1988	1.95 m (6 ft 5 in)	92 kg (203 lb)	348 cm (137 in)	340 cm (130 in)	(Italy) Siena
17	Simone Anzani	24 February 1992	2.04 m (6 ft 8 in)	100 kg (220 lb)	350 cm (140 in)	330 cm (130 in)	(Italy) Modena
20	Gabriele Nelli	4 December 1993	2.10 m (6 ft 11 in)	100 kg (220 lb)	355 cm (140 in)	320 cm (130 in)	(Italy) Trentino

=== Japan ===
The following is the Japanese roster in the 2018 World Championship.

Head coach: Yuichi Nakagaichi

No.	Name	Date of birth	Height	Weight	Spike	Block	2018–19 club
1	Issei Otake	3 December 1995	2.01 m (6 ft 7 in)	98 kg (216 lb)	345 cm (136 in)	327 cm (129 in)	(Japan) Panasonic Panthers
3	Naonobu Fujii	5 January 1992	1.83 m (6 ft 0 in)	78 kg (172 lb)	312 cm (123 in)	297 cm (117 in)	(Japan) Toray Arrows
5	Tatsuya Fukuzawa	1 July 1986	1.89 m (6 ft 2 in)	88 kg (194 lb)	355 cm (140 in)	330 cm (130 in)	(Japan) Panasonic Panthers
6	Akihiro Yamauchi	30 November 1993	2.04 m (6 ft 8 in)	80 kg (180 lb)	353 cm (139 in)	335 cm (132 in)	(Japan) Panasonic Panthers
8	Masahiro Yanagida (c)	6 July 1992	1.86 m (6 ft 1 in)	79 kg (174 lb)	328 cm (129 in)	301 cm (119 in)	Free agent
9	Satoshi Ide	16 January 1992	1.74 m (5 ft 9 in)	74 kg (163 lb)	303 cm (119 in)	290 cm (110 in)	(Japan) Toray Arrows
10	Taichiro Koga	4 October 1989	1.70 m (5 ft 7 in)	70 kg (150 lb)	292 cm (115 in)	277 cm (109 in)	(Japan) Toyoda Gosei Trefuerza
11	Yūji Nishida	30 January 2000	1.86 m (6 ft 1 in)	80 kg (180 lb)	346 cm (136 in)	330 cm (130 in)	(Japan) JTEKT Stings
14	Yūki Ishikawa	11 December 1995	1.91 m (6 ft 3 in)	84 kg (185 lb)	351 cm (138 in)	327 cm (129 in)	Free agent
15	Haku Ri	27 December 1990	1.93 m (6 ft 4 in)	82 kg (181 lb)	344 cm (135 in)	330 cm (130 in)	(Japan) Toray Arrows
16	Kentaro Takahashi	8 February 1995	2.01 m (6 ft 7 in)	103 kg (227 lb)	351 cm (138 in)	338 cm (133 in)	(Japan) Toray Arrows
17	Yamato Fushimi	24 December 1991	2.07 m (6 ft 9 in)	113 kg (249 lb)	340 cm (130 in)	330 cm (130 in)	(Japan) Toray Arrows
18	Masahiro Sekita	20 November 1993	1.75 m (5 ft 9 in)	72 kg (159 lb)	311 cm (122 in)	295 cm (116 in)	(Japan) Panasonic Panthers
19	Hiroaki Asano	6 October 1990	1.75 m (5 ft 9 in)	72 kg (159 lb)	311 cm (122 in)	295 cm (116 in)	(Japan) JTEKT Stings

=== Slovenia ===
The following is the Slovenian roster in the 2018 World Championship.

Head coach: Slobodan Kovač

No.	Name	Date of birth	Height	Weight	Spike	Block	2018–19 club
1	Tonček Štern	14 November 1995	1.98 m (6 ft 6 in)	95 kg (209 lb)	352 cm (139 in)	340 cm (130 in)	(Italy) Verona
2	Alen Pajenk	23 April 1986	2.03 m (6 ft 8 in)	92 kg (203 lb)	366 cm (144 in)	336 cm (132 in)	(Poland) Czarni Radom
4	Jan Kozamernik	24 December 1995	2.04 m (6 ft 8 in)	103 kg (227 lb)	360 cm (140 in)	340 cm (130 in)	(Italy) Milano
5	Alen Šket	28 March 1988	2.05 m (6 ft 9 in)	92 kg (203 lb)	350 cm (140 in)	336 cm (132 in)	(Turkey) Halkbank Ankara
6	Mitja Gasparini	26 June 1984	2.02 m (6 ft 8 in)	93 kg (205 lb)	346 cm (136 in)	333 cm (131 in)	(South Korea) Incheon
8	Uroš Pavlovič	30 March 1992	2.00 m (6 ft 7 in)	93 kg (205 lb)	337 cm (133 in)	315 cm (124 in)	(Slovenia) Ljubljana
9	Dejan Vinčič	15 September 1986	2.00 m (6 ft 7 in)	93 kg (205 lb)	354 cm (139 in)	338 cm (133 in)	(Poland) Czarni Radom
10	Sašo Štalekar	3 May 1996	1.98 m (6 ft 6 in)	95 kg (209 lb)	352 cm (139 in)	340 cm (130 in)	(Slovenia) Kamnik
12	Jan Klobučar	11 December 1992	1.96 m (6 ft 5 in)	92 kg (203 lb)	344 cm (135 in)	325 cm (128 in)	(Poland) Będzin
13	Jani Kovačič	14 June 1992	1.86 m (6 ft 1 in)	83 kg (183 lb)	320 cm (130 in)	305 cm (120 in)	(Slovenia) Ljubljana
14	Urban Toman	21 October 1997	1.85 m (6 ft 1 in)	82 kg (181 lb)	310 cm (120 in)	295 cm (116 in)	(Slovenia) Kranj
16	Gregor Ropret	1 March 1989	1.92 m (6 ft 4 in)	89 kg (196 lb)	343 cm (135 in)	325 cm (128 in)	(France) Nantes
17	Tine Urnaut (c)	3 September 1988	2.00 m (6 ft 7 in)	88 kg (194 lb)	365 cm (144 in)	332 cm (131 in)	(Italy) Modena
18	Klemen Čebulj	21 February 1992	2.02 m (6 ft 8 in)	96 kg (212 lb)	366 cm (144 in)	345 cm (136 in)	(China) Shanghai

== Pool B ==
=== Brazil ===
The following is the Brazilian roster in the 2018 World Championship.

Head coach: Renan Dal Zotto

No.	Name	Date of birth	Height	Weight	Spike	Block	2018–19 club
1	Bruno Rezende (c)	2 July 1986	1.90 m (6 ft 3 in)	76 kg (168 lb)	323 cm (127 in)	302 cm (119 in)	(Italy) Civitanova
2	Isac Santos	13 December 1990	2.08 m (6 ft 10 in)	99 kg (218 lb)	339 cm (133 in)	306 cm (120 in)	(Brazil) Cruzeiro
3	Éder Carbonera	19 October 1983	2.05 m (6 ft 9 in)	107 kg (236 lb)	360 cm (140 in)	330 cm (130 in)	(Brazil) SESI São Paulo
5	Lucas Lóh	18 January 1991	1.95 m (6 ft 5 in)	83 kg (183 lb)	336 cm (132 in)	320 cm (130 in)	(Brazil) SESI São Paulo
7	William Arjona	31 July 1979	1.86 m (6 ft 1 in)	78 kg (172 lb)	300 cm (120 in)	295 cm (116 in)	(Brazil) SESI São Paulo
8	Wallace de Souza	26 June 1987	1.98 m (6 ft 6 in)	87 kg (192 lb)	344 cm (135 in)	318 cm (125 in)	(Brazil) SESC Rio de Janeiro
9	Thales Hoss	26 April 1989	1.90 m (6 ft 3 in)	74 kg (163 lb)	320 cm (130 in)	303 cm (119 in)	(Brazil) Taubaté
12	Luiz Felipe Fonteles	19 June 1984	1.98 m (6 ft 6 in)	100 kg (220 lb)	351 cm (138 in)	340 cm (130 in)	(Brazil) SESI São Paulo
13	Maurício Souza	29 September 1988	2.09 m (6 ft 10 in)	93 kg (205 lb)	344 cm (135 in)	323 cm (127 in)	(Brazil) SESC Rio de Janeiro
14	Douglas Souza	20 August 1995	1.99 m (6 ft 6 in)	75 kg (165 lb)	338 cm (133 in)	317 cm (125 in)	(Brazil) Taubaté
15	Carlos Eduardo Silva	8 August 1994	2.00 m (6 ft 7 in)	90 kg (200 lb)	348 cm (137 in)	340 cm (130 in)	(Italy) Vibo Valentia
16	Lucas Saatkamp	6 March 1986	2.09 m (6 ft 10 in)	101 kg (223 lb)	340 cm (130 in)	321 cm (126 in)	(Brazil) Taubaté
17	Evandro Guerra	27 December 1981	2.07 m (6 ft 9 in)	106 kg (234 lb)	359 cm (141 in)	332 cm (131 in)	(Brazil) Cruzeiro
22	Maique Nascimento	16 July 1997	1.82 m (6 ft 0 in)	76 kg (168 lb)	310 cm (120 in)	255 cm (100 in)	(Brazil) Minas

=== Canada ===
The following is the Canadian roster in the 2018 World Championship.

Head coach: Stéphane Antiga

No.	Name	Date of birth	Height	Weight	Spike	Block	2018–19 club
1	TJ Sanders	14 December 1991	1.91 m (6 ft 3 in)	81 kg (179 lb)	326 cm (128 in)	308 cm (121 in)	(Poland) Gdańsk
2	John Gordon Perrin (c)	17 August 1989	2.01 m (6 ft 7 in)	95 kg (209 lb)	353 cm (139 in)	329 cm (130 in)	(China) Beijing Volleyball
3	Steven Marshall	23 November 1989	1.93 m (6 ft 4 in)	87 kg (192 lb)	350 cm (140 in)	322 cm (127 in)	(Germany) Berlin Recycling Volleys
4	Nicholas Hoag	19 August 1992	2.00 m (6 ft 7 in)	91 kg (201 lb)	342 cm (135 in)	322 cm (127 in)	(Italy) Trentino
5	Lucas Van Berkel	29 November 1991	2.10 m (6 ft 11 in)	108 kg (238 lb)	350 cm (140 in)	326 cm (128 in)	(Italy) Spoleto
7	Stephen Timothy Maar	6 December 1994	2.01 m (6 ft 7 in)	103 kg (227 lb)	350 cm (140 in)	328 cm (129 in)	(Italy) Verona
8	Jay Blankenau	27 September 1989	1.94 m (6 ft 4 in)	94 kg (207 lb)	334 cm (131 in)	307 cm (121 in)	(Belgium) Maaseik
9	Jason DeRocco	19 September 1989	1.98 m (6 ft 6 in)	94 kg (207 lb)	342 cm (135 in)	318 cm (125 in)	(Poland) Jastrzębski Węgiel
10	Sharone Vernon-Evans	28 August 1998	2.02 m (6 ft 8 in)	94 kg (207 lb)	374 cm (147 in)	347 cm (137 in)	(Poland) Warszawa
11	Daniel Jansen Van Doorn	21 March 1990	2.07 m (6 ft 9 in)	98 kg (216 lb)	351 cm (138 in)	328 cm (129 in)	(France) Chaumont
16	Ryan Sclater	10 February 1994	2.00 m (6 ft 7 in)	92 kg (203 lb)	347 cm (137 in)	320 cm (130 in)	(Germany) Lüneburg
17	Graham Vigrass	17 June 1989	2.05 m (6 ft 9 in)	97 kg (214 lb)	354 cm (139 in)	330 cm (130 in)	(Germany) Berlin Recycling Volleys
19	Blair Bann	26 February 1988	1.84 m (6 ft 0 in)	84 kg (185 lb)	314 cm (124 in)	295 cm (116 in)	(Germany) Powervolleys Düren
20	Arthur Szwarc	30 March 1995	2.07 m (6 ft 9 in)	97 kg (214 lb)	356 cm (140 in)	335 cm (132 in)	(France) Arago de Sète

=== China ===
The following is the Chinese roster in the 2018 World Championship.

Head coach: Raúl Lozano

No.	Name	Date of birth	Height	Weight	Spike	Block	2018–19 club
2	Jiang Chuan	9 August 1994	2.05 m (6 ft 9 in)	91 kg (201 lb)	365 cm (144 in)	345 cm (136 in)	(China) Beijing
3	Mao Tianyi	2 June 1993	2.00 m (6 ft 7 in)	90 kg (200 lb)	350 cm (140 in)	340 cm (130 in)	(China) Bayi
5	Zhang Binglong	11 September 1994	1.97 m (6 ft 6 in)	99 kg (218 lb)	355 cm (140 in)	345 cm (136 in)	(China) Beijing
7	Zhang Jingyin	20 December 1999	2.07 m (6 ft 9 in)	88 kg (194 lb)	357 cm (141 in)	325 cm (128 in)	(China) Zhejiang
9	Yu Yaochen	19 August 1995	1.95 m (6 ft 5 in)	78 kg (172 lb)	347 cm (137 in)	338 cm (133 in)	(China) Jiangsu
10	Ji Daoshuai (c)	7 February 1992	1.94 m (6 ft 4 in)	82 kg (181 lb)	355 cm (140 in)	335 cm (132 in)	(China) Shandong
11	Du Haixiang	25 May 1995	1.94 m (6 ft 4 in)	87 kg (192 lb)	348 cm (137 in)	336 cm (132 in)	(China) Sichuan
13	Chen Longhai	29 March 1991	2.00 m (6 ft 7 in)	85 kg (187 lb)	350 cm (140 in)	340 cm (130 in)	(China) Shanghai
15	Tang Chuanhang	4 October 1995	2.02 m (6 ft 8 in)	92 kg (203 lb)	350 cm (140 in)	340 cm (130 in)	(China) Bayi
16	Tong Jiahua	13 December 1992	1.80 m (5 ft 11 in)	76 kg (168 lb)	330 cm (130 in)	320 cm (130 in)	(China) Shanghai
17	Liu Libin	16 February 1995	1.97 m (6 ft 6 in)	90 kg (200 lb)	350 cm (140 in)	342 cm (135 in)	(China) Beijing
20	Rao Shuhan	23 December 1996	2.05 m (6 ft 9 in)	99 kg (218 lb)	360 cm (140 in)	350 cm (140 in)	(China) Fujian
21	Miao Ruantong	21 May 1995	2.05 m (6 ft 9 in)	88 kg (194 lb)	354 cm (139 in)	345 cm (136 in)	(China) Hubei
27	Ma Xiaoteng	19 June 1991	1.80 m (5 ft 11 in)	85 kg (187 lb)	330 cm (130 in)	320 cm (130 in)	(China) Bayi

=== Egypt ===
The following is the Egyptian roster in the 2018 World Championship.

Head coach: Mohamed Moselhy Ibrahim

No.	Name	Date of birth	Height	Weight	Spike	Block	2018–19 club
2	Abdallah Abdalsalam	10 October 1983	2.02 m (6 ft 8 in)	85 kg (187 lb)	346 cm (136 in)	330 cm (130 in)	(Egypt) Al Ahly
3	Halim Ebo	3 June 1989	2.10 m (6 ft 11 in)	88 kg (194 lb)	360 cm (140 in)	345 cm (136 in)	(Egypt) Al Ahly
4	Ahmed Salah (c)	19 August 1984	1.97 m (6 ft 6 in)	87 kg (192 lb)	342 cm (135 in)	316 cm (124 in)	(Egypt) Al Ahly
5	Abdelrahman Seoudy	21 August 1997	2.07 m (6 ft 9 in)	100 kg (220 lb)	350 cm (140 in)	337 cm (133 in)	(Egypt) Al Ahly
6	Sherif Aly	24 April 1994	1.85 m (6 ft 1 in)	77 kg (170 lb)	333 cm (131 in)	317 cm (125 in)	(Egypt) Al Ahly
7	Hisham Ewais	26 February 1995	1.96 m (6 ft 5 in)	75 kg (165 lb)	346 cm (136 in)	322 cm (127 in)	(Egypt) Smouha
9	Rashad Atia	2 September 1986	2.01 m (6 ft 7 in)	91 kg (201 lb)	348 cm (137 in)	342 cm (135 in)	(Egypt) Tala'ea El Gaish
10	Mohamed Masoud	1 May 1994	2.11 m (6 ft 11 in)	105 kg (231 lb)	358 cm (141 in)	342 cm (135 in)	(Egypt) Al Ahly
11	Ahmed Mohamed	1 March 1989	1.93 m (6 ft 4 in)	83 kg (183 lb)	335 cm (132 in)	330 cm (130 in)	(Egypt) Al Ahly
12	Hossam Abdalla	16 February 1988	2.03 m (6 ft 8 in)	97 kg (214 lb)	345 cm (136 in)	338 cm (133 in)	(Egypt) Al Ahly
14	Omar Hassan	4 April 1991	1.91 m (6 ft 3 in)	104 kg (229 lb)	333 cm (131 in)	324 cm (128 in)	(Egypt) Tala'ea El Gaish
15	Ahmed Abdelaal	8 June 1989	1.88 m (6 ft 2 in)	84 kg (185 lb)	325 cm (128 in)	312 cm (123 in)	(Egypt) Tala'ea El Gaish
18	Ahmed Shafik	7 December 1994	1.90 m (6 ft 3 in)	89 kg (196 lb)	358 cm (141 in)	341 cm (134 in)	(Egypt) Al Ahly
19	Mostafa Abdelrahman	25 January 1994	1.97 m (6 ft 6 in)	94 kg (207 lb)	353 cm (139 in)	337 cm (133 in)	(Egypt) Zamalek

=== France ===
The following is the French roster in the 2018 World Championship.

Head coach: Laurent Tillie

No.	Name	Date of birth	Height	Weight	Spike	Block	2018–19 club
2	Jenia Grebennikov	13 August 1990	1.88 m (6 ft 2 in)	85 kg (187 lb)	345 cm (136 in)	330 cm (130 in)	(Italy) Trentino
4	Jean Patry	27 December 1996	2.07 m (6 ft 9 in)	94 kg (207 lb)	357 cm (141 in)	334 cm (131 in)	(France) Montpellier
6	Benjamin Toniutti (c)	30 October 1989	1.83 m (6 ft 0 in)	73 kg (161 lb)	320 cm (130 in)	300 cm (120 in)	(Poland) Kędzierzyn-Koźle
7	Kévin Tillie	2 November 1990	2.00 m (6 ft 7 in)	85 kg (187 lb)	345 cm (136 in)	325 cm (128 in)	(China) Beijing
8	Julien Lyneel	15 April 1990	1.92 m (6 ft 4 in)	87 kg (192 lb)	345 cm (136 in)	325 cm (128 in)	(Poland) Jastrzębski Węgiel
9	Earvin N'Gapeth	12 February 1991	1.94 m (6 ft 4 in)	101 kg (223 lb)	358 cm (141 in)	327 cm (129 in)	(Russia) Zenit Kazan
10	Kévin Le Roux	11 May 1989	2.09 m (6 ft 10 in)	95 kg (209 lb)	365 cm (144 in)	345 cm (136 in)	(France) Rennes
11	Antoine Brizard	22 May 1994	1.96 m (6 ft 5 in)	96 kg (212 lb)	340 cm (130 in)	310 cm (120 in)	(Poland) Warszawa
12	Stéphen Boyer	10 April 1996	1.96 m (6 ft 5 in)	77 kg (170 lb)	355 cm (140 in)	334 cm (131 in)	(Italy) Calzedonia Verona
14	Nicolas Le Goff	15 February 1992	2.06 m (6 ft 9 in)	105 kg (231 lb)	375 cm (148 in)	345 cm (136 in)	(Italy) Latina
15	Jérémie Mouiel	4 May 1995	1.76 m (5 ft 9 in)	52 kg (115 lb)	290 cm (110 in)	260 cm (100 in)	(France) Cannes
16	Daryl Bultor	17 November 1995	1.97 m (6 ft 6 in)	94 kg (207 lb)	352 cm (139 in)	327 cm (129 in)	(France) Arago de Sète
18	Thibault Rossard	28 August 1993	1.94 m (6 ft 4 in)	85 kg (187 lb)	350 cm (140 in)	320 cm (130 in)	(Poland) Rzeszów
21	Barthélémy Chinenyeze	28 February 1998	2.01 m (6 ft 7 in)	81 kg (179 lb)	357 cm (141 in)	332 cm (131 in)	(France) Tours

=== Netherlands ===
The following is the Dutch roster in the 2018 World Championship.

Head coach: Gido Vermeulen

No.	Name	Date of birth	Height	Weight	Spike	Block	2018–19 club
1	Daan van Haarlem	15 March 1989	1.98 m (6 ft 6 in)	89 kg (196 lb)	332 cm (131 in)	323 cm (127 in)	(Bulgaria) Levski Sofia
2	Wessel Keemink	29 May 1993	1.97 m (6 ft 6 in)	81 kg (179 lb)	337 cm (133 in)	326 cm (128 in)	(Belgium) Aalst
3	Maarten van Garderen	24 January 1990	2.00 m (6 ft 7 in)	89 kg (196 lb)	359 cm (141 in)	338 cm (133 in)	(Italy) Trentino
4	Thijs ter Horst	18 September 1991	2.04 m (6 ft 8 in)	94 kg (207 lb)	364 cm (143 in)	344 cm (135 in)	(South Korea) Daejeon Bluefangs
5	Dirk Sparidans	5 March 1989	1.81 m (5 ft 11 in)	86 kg (190 lb)	326 cm (128 in)	300 cm (120 in)	(France) Nantes
6	Jasper Diefenbach	17 March 1988	1.95 m (6 ft 5 in)	90 kg (200 lb)	345 cm (136 in)	330 cm (130 in)	(France) Tours
7	Gijs Jorna	30 May 1989	1.96 m (6 ft 5 in)	85 kg (187 lb)	340 cm (130 in)	310 cm (120 in)	(France) Spacer's Toulouse
10	Jeroen Rauwerdink	13 September 1985	2.00 m (6 ft 7 in)	92 kg (203 lb)	350 cm (140 in)	320 cm (130 in)	(Greece) Olympiacos
12	Tim Smit	31 December 1989	2.01 m (6 ft 7 in)	92 kg (203 lb)	343 cm (135 in)	332 cm (131 in)	(France) Tourcoing
14	Nimir Abdel-Aziz (c)	5 February 1992	2.01 m (6 ft 7 in)	86 kg (190 lb)	365 cm (144 in)	350 cm (140 in)	(Italy) Milano
15	Thomas Koelewijn	18 December 1988	2.06 m (6 ft 9 in)	100 kg (220 lb)	360 cm (140 in)	350 cm (140 in)	(France) Stade Poitevin Poitiers
16	Wouter ter Maat	7 May 1991	2.00 m (6 ft 7 in)	90 kg (200 lb)	351 cm (138 in)	338 cm (133 in)	(Turkey) Fenerbahçe
17	Michaël Parkinson	23 November 1991	2.03 m (6 ft 8 in)	98 kg (216 lb)	365 cm (144 in)	350 cm (140 in)	(France) Nantes
19	Just Dronkers	7 June 1993	1.87 m (6 ft 2 in)	78 kg (172 lb)	330 cm (130 in)	308 cm (121 in)	(Belgium) Maaseik

== Pool C ==
=== Australia ===
The following is the Australian roster in the 2018 World Championship.

Head coach: Mark Lebedew

No.	Name	Date of birth	Height	Weight	Spike	Block	2018–19 club
1	Beau Graham	17 April 1994	2.02 m (6 ft 8 in)	86 kg (190 lb)	351 cm (138 in)	332 cm (131 in)	(France) Saint-Quentin
2	Arshdeep Dosanjh	30 July 1996	2.05 m (6 ft 9 in)	85 kg (187 lb)	347 cm (137 in)	335 cm (132 in)	(Switzerland) Chênois Genève
4	Paul Sanderson	7 January 1986	1.95 m (6 ft 5 in)	94 kg (207 lb)	348 cm (137 in)	335 cm (132 in)	(Tunisia) Sahel
5	Travis Passier	26 April 1989	2.08 m (6 ft 10 in)	100 kg (220 lb)	355 cm (140 in)	340 cm (130 in)	(Czech Republic) Příbram
7	Harrison Peacock	31 January 1991	1.92 m (6 ft 4 in)	87 kg (192 lb)	353 cm (139 in)	339 cm (133 in)	(Poland) Bielsko-Biała
8	Trent O'Dea	11 May 1994	2.01 m (6 ft 7 in)	98 kg (216 lb)	354 cm (139 in)	344 cm (135 in)	(Finland) Raision Loimu
9	Max Staples	27 July 1994	1.94 m (6 ft 4 in)	83 kg (183 lb)	358 cm (141 in)	345 cm (136 in)	(Finland) Hurrikaani Loimaa
11	Luke Perry	20 November 1995	1.80 m (5 ft 11 in)	75 kg (165 lb)	331 cm (130 in)	315 cm (124 in)	(Germany) Berlin Recycling Volleys
12	Nehemiah Mote	21 June 1993	2.04 m (6 ft 8 in)	91 kg (201 lb)	362 cm (143 in)	354 cm (139 in)	(Switzerland) Amriswil
13	Samuel Walker	19 February 1995	2.08 m (6 ft 10 in)	90 kg (200 lb)	350 cm (140 in)	337 cm (133 in)	(Estonia) Tartu
15	Luke Smith	30 August 1990	2.04 m (6 ft 8 in)	95 kg (209 lb)	360 cm (140 in)	342 cm (135 in)	(Portugal) Sporting
17	Paul Carroll (c)	16 May 1986	2.07 m (6 ft 9 in)	100 kg (220 lb)	354 cm (139 in)	340 cm (130 in)	(Germany) Berlin Recycling Volleys
18	Lincoln Williams	6 October 1993	2.00 m (6 ft 7 in)	104 kg (229 lb)	353 cm (139 in)	330 cm (130 in)	(Germany) United Rhein-Main
20	Thomas Hodges	4 July 1994	1.97 m (6 ft 6 in)	95 kg (209 lb)	350 cm (140 in)	338 cm (133 in)	(Italy) Lagonegro

=== Cameroon ===
The following is the Cameroonian roster in the 2018 World Championship.

Head coach: Blaise Mayam Re Niof

No.	Name	Date of birth	Height	Weight	Spike	Block	2018 club
2	Ahmed Awal Mbutngam	2 June 1990	1.91 m (6 ft 3 in)	90 kg (200 lb)	0 cm (0 in)	0 cm (0 in)	(Cameroon) FAP Yaoundé
3	Herman Marie Engala	29 December 1985	2.08 m (6 ft 10 in)	104 kg (229 lb)	350 cm (140 in)	330 cm (130 in)	Free agent
4	Bana Hassana	3 April 1995	2.02 m (6 ft 8 in)	85 kg (187 lb)	345 cm (136 in)	340 cm (130 in)	(Cameroon) Bafia Evolution
6	Sem Delegombai	18 May 1990	2.00 m (6 ft 7 in)	95 kg (209 lb)	350 cm (140 in)	335 cm (132 in)	(France) Avignon
8	Junior Charles Engohe	22 April 1984	1.94 m (6 ft 4 in)	85 kg (187 lb)	355 cm (140 in)	340 cm (130 in)	(France) Vendée
9	Jean-Pierre Ndongo	5 February 1986	1.96 m (6 ft 5 in)	92 kg (203 lb)	345 cm (136 in)	303 cm (119 in)	Free agent
10	Didier Sali Hilé	9 June 1991	1.92 m (6 ft 4 in)	80 kg (180 lb)	346 cm (136 in)	320 cm (130 in)	(Iraq) Al-Shorta
11	Yannick Bikoi-Bi-Nkot	18 January 1984	1.77 m (5 ft 10 in)	68 kg (150 lb)	305 cm (120 in)	285 cm (112 in)	(Cameroon) Cameroun Sports
12	Arsene Ivan Ebouma Moto	13 April 1990	1.80 m (5 ft 11 in)	70 kg (150 lb)	330 cm (130 in)	315 cm (124 in)	(Cameroon) FAP Yaoundé
13	Cyrille Pierre Ongolo Mayam	27 September 1991	1.96 m (6 ft 5 in)	88 kg (194 lb)	345 cm (136 in)	325 cm (128 in)	(Algeria) Hassi Bounif
14	Nathan Wounembaina (c)	22 November 1984	1.98 m (6 ft 6 in)	83 kg (183 lb)	360 cm (140 in)	345 cm (136 in)	(France) Tours
15	Yvan Arthur Kody Bitjaa	25 August 1991	2.13 m (7 ft 0 in)	92 kg (203 lb)	360 cm (140 in)	345 cm (136 in)	(Italy) Piacenza
16	Alain Fossi Kamto	4 November 1980	1.83 m (6 ft 0 in)	81 kg (179 lb)	333 cm (131 in)	302 cm (119 in)	(France) Niort
17	David Patrick Feughouo	5 May 1989	2.06 m (6 ft 9 in)	95 kg (209 lb)	355 cm (140 in)	332 cm (131 in)	(France) Nancy

=== Russia ===
The following is the Russian roster in the 2018 World Championship.

Head coach: Sergey Shlyapnikov

No.	Name	Date of birth	Height	Weight	Spike	Block	2018–19 club
2	Ilya Vlasov	3 August 1995	2.12 m (6 ft 11 in)	98 kg (216 lb)	360 cm (140 in)	345 cm (136 in)	(Russia) Fakel Novy Urengoy
4	Artem Volvich	22 January 1990	2.08 m (6 ft 10 in)	96 kg (212 lb)	350 cm (140 in)	330 cm (130 in)	(Russia) Zenit Kazan
5	Sergey Grankin (c)	21 January 1985	1.95 m (6 ft 5 in)	96 kg (212 lb)	351 cm (138 in)	320 cm (130 in)	(Russia) Belogorie
7	Dmitry Volkov	25 May 1995	2.01 m (6 ft 7 in)	88 kg (194 lb)	340 cm (130 in)	330 cm (130 in)	(Russia) Fakel Novy Urengoy
8	Aleksey Rodichev	24 March 1988	1.96 m (6 ft 5 in)	80 kg (180 lb)	340 cm (130 in)	325 cm (128 in)	(Russia) Lokomotiv Novosibirsk
9	Yury Berezhko	27 January 1984	1.96 m (6 ft 5 in)	93 kg (205 lb)	346 cm (136 in)	338 cm (133 in)	(Russia) Dinamo Moscow
10	Aleksandr Sokolov	1 March 1982	1.93 m (6 ft 4 in)	97 kg (214 lb)	315 cm (124 in)	310 cm (120 in)	(Russia) Yaroslavich Yaroslavl
12	Aleksandr Butko	18 March 1986	1.98 m (6 ft 6 in)	97 kg (214 lb)	339 cm (133 in)	327 cm (129 in)	(Russia) Zenit Kazan
13	Dmitry Muserskiy	29 October 1988	2.18 m (7 ft 2 in)	104 kg (229 lb)	375 cm (148 in)	347 cm (137 in)	(Russia) Belogorie
15	Viktor Poletaev	27 July 1995	1.97 m (6 ft 6 in)	86 kg (190 lb)	360 cm (140 in)	340 cm (130 in)	(Russia) Kuzbass Kemerovo
16	Aleksey Verbov	31 January 1982	1.83 m (6 ft 0 in)	79 kg (174 lb)	315 cm (124 in)	310 cm (120 in)	(Russia) Zenit Kazan
17	Maxim Mikhaylov	19 March 1988	2.02 m (6 ft 8 in)	103 kg (227 lb)	345 cm (136 in)	330 cm (130 in)	(Russia) Zenit Kazan
18	Egor Kliuka	15 June 1995	2.08 m (6 ft 10 in)	93 kg (205 lb)	360 cm (140 in)	350 cm (140 in)	(Russia) Fakel Novy Urengoy
20	Ilyas Kurkaev	18 January 1994	2.07 m (6 ft 9 in)	95 kg (209 lb)	355 cm (140 in)	335 cm (132 in)	(Russia) Lokomotiv Novosibirsk

=== Serbia ===
The following is the Serbian roster in the 2018 World Championship.

Head coach: Nikola Grbić

No.	Name	Date of birth	Height	Weight	Spike	Block	2018–19 club
1	Aleksandar Okolić	26 June 1993	2.05 m (6 ft 9 in)	90 kg (200 lb)	347 cm (137 in)	320 cm (130 in)	(Greece) PAOK Thessaloniki
2	Uroš Kovačević	6 May 1993	1.97 m (6 ft 6 in)	90 kg (200 lb)	340 cm (130 in)	320 cm (130 in)	(Italy) Trentino
3	Milan Katić	22 October 1993	2.02 m (6 ft 8 in)	99 kg (218 lb)	345 cm (136 in)	331 cm (130 in)	(Poland) Skra Bełchatów
4	Nemanja Petrić (c)	28 July 1987	2.02 m (6 ft 8 in)	86 kg (190 lb)	333 cm (131 in)	320 cm (130 in)	(Russia) Belogorie
7	Petar Krsmanović	1 June 1990	2.05 m (6 ft 9 in)	98 kg (216 lb)	354 cm (139 in)	330 cm (130 in)	(Russia) Surgut
8	Marko Ivović	22 December 1990	1.94 m (6 ft 4 in)	89 kg (196 lb)	365 cm (144 in)	330 cm (130 in)	(Russia) Lokomotiv Novosibirsk
9	Nikola Jovović	13 February 1992	1.97 m (6 ft 6 in)	75 kg (165 lb)	335 cm (132 in)	315 cm (124 in)	(Turkey) Ziraat Ankara
14	Aleksandar Atanasijević	4 September 1991	2.00 m (6 ft 7 in)	92 kg (203 lb)	350 cm (140 in)	329 cm (130 in)	(Italy) Perugia
16	Dražen Luburić	2 November 1993	2.02 m (6 ft 8 in)	90 kg (200 lb)	337 cm (133 in)	331 cm (130 in)	(Turkey) Halkbank Ankara
17	Neven Majstorović	17 March 1989	1.93 m (6 ft 4 in)	90 kg (200 lb)	335 cm (132 in)	325 cm (128 in)	(Romania) Craiova
18	Marko Podraščanin	29 August 1987	2.03 m (6 ft 8 in)	100 kg (220 lb)	354 cm (139 in)	332 cm (131 in)	(Italy) Perugia
19	Nikola Rosić	5 August 1984	1.92 m (6 ft 4 in)	85 kg (187 lb)	330 cm (130 in)	320 cm (130 in)	(Romania) Craiova
20	Srećko Lisinac	17 May 1992	2.05 m (6 ft 9 in)	90 kg (200 lb)	355 cm (140 in)	342 cm (135 in)	(Italy) Trentino
21	Ivan Kostić	8 January 1988	1.92 m (6 ft 4 in)	90 kg (200 lb)	327 cm (129 in)	320 cm (130 in)	(Serbia) Vojvodina

=== Tunisia ===
The following is the Tunisian roster in the 2018 World Championship.

Head coach: (Italy) Antonio Giacobbe

No.	Name	Date of birth	Height	Weight	Spike	Block	2018–19 club
1	Mohamed Ridene	14 February 1996	1.80 m (5 ft 11 in)	74 kg (163 lb)	305 cm (120 in)	285 cm (112 in)	(Tunisia) CO Kélibia
2	Ahmed Kadhi	19 April 1989	1.99 m (6 ft 6 in)	99 kg (218 lb)	345 cm (136 in)	318 cm (125 in)	(Tunisia) ES Sahel
3	Marouane M'rabet (c)	5 June 1985	1.86 m (6 ft 1 in)	82 kg (181 lb)	315 cm (124 in)	296 cm (117 in)	(Tunisia) CS Sfaxien
5	Wassim Ben Tara	3 August 1996	1.99 m (6 ft 6 in)	87 kg (192 lb)	340 cm (130 in)	320 cm (130 in)	(France) Chaumont
6	Mohamed Ali Ben Othmen Miladi	12 May 1991	1.88 m (6 ft 2 in)	73 kg (161 lb)	315 cm (124 in)	289 cm (114 in)	(Tunisia) ES Tunis
7	Elyes Karamosli	22 August 1989	1.98 m (6 ft 6 in)	99 kg (218 lb)	330 cm (130 in)	320 cm (130 in)	(Tunisia) ES Tunis
8	Nabil Miladi	28 February 1988	1.96 m (6 ft 5 in)	73 kg (161 lb)	355 cm (140 in)	340 cm (130 in)	(Tunisia) ES Tunis
9	Amen Allah Hmissi	6 April 1988	1.80 m (5 ft 11 in)	78 kg (172 lb)	310 cm (120 in)	295 cm (116 in)	(Tunisia) ES Sahel
10	Hamza Nagga	29 May 1990	1.91 m (6 ft 3 in)	84 kg (185 lb)	335 cm (132 in)	311 cm (122 in)	(Tunisia) ES Sahel
11	Hakim Zouari	28 March 1988	1.97 m (6 ft 6 in)	97 kg (214 lb)	330 cm (130 in)	320 cm (130 in)	(Tunisia) CS Sfaxien
12	Anouer Taouerghi	17 August 1983	1.78 m (5 ft 10 in)	74 kg (163 lb)	302 cm (119 in)	292 cm (115 in)	(Tunisia) CS Sfaxien
16	Khaled Ben Slimene	14 December 1994	1.93 m (6 ft 4 in)	78 kg (172 lb)	290 cm (110 in)	285 cm (112 in)	(Tunisia) ES Tunis
18	Ali Bongui	14 August 1996	1.80 m (5 ft 11 in)	75 kg (165 lb)	225 cm (89 in)	325 cm (128 in)	(Tunisia) CS Sfaxien
20	Omar Agrebi	26 August 1992	2.05 m (6 ft 9 in)	82 kg (181 lb)	325 cm (128 in)	310 cm (120 in)	(Tunisia) CS Sfaxien

=== United States ===
The following is the American roster in the 2018 World Championship.

Head coach: John Speraw

No.	Name	Date of birth	Height	Weight	Spike	Block	2018–19 club
1	Matt Anderson	18 April 1987	2.02 m (6 ft 8 in)	100 kg (220 lb)	360 cm (140 in)	332 cm (131 in)	(Russia) Zenit Kazan
2	Aaron Russell	4 June 1993	2.05 m (6 ft 9 in)	98 kg (216 lb)	356 cm (140 in)	337 cm (133 in)	(Italy) Perugia
3	Taylor Sander (c)	17 March 1992	1.96 m (6 ft 5 in)	80 kg (180 lb)	345 cm (136 in)	320 cm (130 in)	(Italy) Civitanova
4	Jeffrey Jendryk	15 September 1995	2.08 m (6 ft 10 in)	89 kg (196 lb)	353 cm (139 in)	345 cm (136 in)	(United States) Loyola University Chicago
7	Kawika Shoji	11 November 1987	1.90 m (6 ft 3 in)	79 kg (174 lb)	331 cm (130 in)	315 cm (124 in)	(Italy) Monza
10	Daniel Mcdonnell	15 September 1988	2.00 m (6 ft 7 in)	90 kg (200 lb)	355 cm (140 in)	345 cm (136 in)	(Poland) Gdańsk
11	Micah Christenson	8 May 1993	1.98 m (6 ft 6 in)	88 kg (194 lb)	349 cm (137 in)	340 cm (130 in)	(Italy) Civitanova
12	Maxwell Holt	12 March 1987	2.05 m (6 ft 9 in)	90 kg (200 lb)	351 cm (138 in)	333 cm (131 in)	(Italy) Modena
13	Benjamin Patch	21 June 1994	2.03 m (6 ft 8 in)	90 kg (200 lb)	368 cm (145 in)	348 cm (137 in)	(Italy) Vibo Valentia
18	Jake Langlois	14 May 1992	2.08 m (6 ft 10 in)	93 kg (205 lb)	365 cm (144 in)	355 cm (140 in)	(Italy) Monza
19	Taylor Averill	5 March 1992	2.01 m (6 ft 7 in)	94 kg (207 lb)	370 cm (150 in)	330 cm (130 in)	(Italy) Milano
20	David Smith	15 May 1985	2.01 m (6 ft 7 in)	86 kg (190 lb)	348 cm (137 in)	314 cm (124 in)	(Poland) Zawiercie
21	Dustin Watten	27 October 1986	1.82 m (6 ft 0 in)	80 kg (180 lb)	306 cm (120 in)	295 cm (116 in)	(Poland) Czarni Radom
22	Erik Shoji	24 August 1989	1.84 m (6 ft 0 in)	83 kg (183 lb)	330 cm (130 in)	321 cm (126 in)	(Italy) Latina

== Pool D ==
=== Bulgaria ===
The following is the Bulgarian roster in the 2018 World Championship.

Head coach: Plamen Konstantinov

No.	Name	Date of birth	Height	Weight	Spike	Block	2018–19 club
2	Miroslav Gradinarov	10 February 1985	2.03 m (6 ft 8 in)	92 kg (203 lb)	350 cm (140 in)	330 cm (130 in)	(Qatar) El Jaish
5	Svetoslav Gotsev	31 August 1990	2.05 m (6 ft 9 in)	97 kg (214 lb)	358 cm (141 in)	335 cm (132 in)	(France) Tours
6	Rozalin Penchev	11 December 1994	1.97 m (6 ft 6 in)	79 kg (174 lb)	337 cm (133 in)	327 cm (129 in)	(Argentina) Bolívar
7	Nikolay Uchikov	13 April 1986	2.07 m (6 ft 9 in)	110 kg (240 lb)	355 cm (140 in)	330 cm (130 in)	(Greece) PAOK
8	Todor Skrimov	9 January 1990	1.91 m (6 ft 3 in)	87 kg (192 lb)	348 cm (137 in)	330 cm (130 in)	(Italy) Loreto
9	Georgi Seganov	10 June 1993	1.98 m (6 ft 6 in)	83 kg (183 lb)	355 cm (140 in)	325 cm (128 in)	(Italy) Sora
10	Valentin Bratoev	21 October 1987	2.03 m (6 ft 8 in)	92 kg (203 lb)	347 cm (137 in)	337 cm (133 in)	(Bulgaria) Neftohimik
12	Viktor Yosifov (c)	16 October 1985	2.04 m (6 ft 8 in)	100 kg (220 lb)	350 cm (140 in)	340 cm (130 in)	(Italy) Piacenza
13	Teodor Salparov	16 August 1982	1.87 m (6 ft 2 in)	77 kg (170 lb)	320 cm (130 in)	305 cm (120 in)	(Bulgaria) Neftohimik
14	Teodor Todorov	1 September 1989	2.08 m (6 ft 10 in)	108 kg (238 lb)	365 cm (144 in)	345 cm (136 in)	(Turkey) Galatasaray
15	Ivan Stanev	7 July 1985	1.90 m (6 ft 3 in)	86 kg (190 lb)	335 cm (132 in)	325 cm (128 in)	(Bulgaria) Neftohimik
17	Nikolay Penchev	22 May 1992	1.97 m (6 ft 6 in)	87 kg (192 lb)	341 cm (134 in)	335 cm (132 in)	(Poland) Skra Bełchatów
18	Nikolay Nikolov	29 July 1986	2.06 m (6 ft 9 in)	97 kg (214 lb)	350 cm (140 in)	332 cm (131 in)	(Bulgaria) Neftohimik
21	Petar Karakashev	11 February 1991	1.84 m (6 ft 0 in)	77 kg (170 lb)	326 cm (128 in)	308 cm (121 in)	(Bulgaria) Pirin Razlog

=== Cuba ===
The following is the Cuban roster in the 2018 World Championship.

Head coach: Nicolas Vives

No.	Name	Date of birth	Height	Weight	Spike	Block	2018–19 club
2	Osniel Melgarejo	18 December 1997	1.95 m (6 ft 5 in)	83 kg (183 lb)	345 cm (136 in)	320 cm (130 in)	(Cuba) Sancti Spíritus
3	Marlon Yang	23 May 2001	2.02 m (6 ft 8 in)	75 kg (165 lb)	345 cm (136 in)	320 cm (130 in)	(Cuba) Villa Clara
5	Javier Concepción	27 December 1997	2.00 m (6 ft 7 in)	84 kg (185 lb)	356 cm (140 in)	350 cm (140 in)	(Cuba) La Habana
7	Yonder García	26 February 1993	1.83 m (6 ft 0 in)	78 kg (172 lb)	325 cm (128 in)	320 cm (130 in)	(Cuba) Ciudad Habana
9	Liván Osoria (C)	5 February 1994	2.01 m (6 ft 7 in)	95 kg (209 lb)	345 cm (136 in)	325 cm (128 in)	Santiago de Cuba
10	Miguel Gutiérrez	21 February 1997	1.97 m (6 ft 6 in)	82 kg (181 lb)	340 cm (130 in)	355 cm (140 in)	(Cuba) Villa Clara
11	Liván Taboada	4 October 1999	1.91 m (6 ft 3 in)	75 kg (165 lb)	343 cm (135 in)	327 cm (129 in)	(Cuba) La Habana
12	Jesúss Herrera	4 April 1995	1.94 m (6 ft 4 in)	85 kg (187 lb)	345 cm (136 in)	336 cm (132 in)	(Cuba) Artemisa
14	Adrián Goide	26 June 1998	1.91 m (6 ft 3 in)	80 kg (180 lb)	344 cm (135 in)	340 cm (130 in)	(Cuba) Sancti Spíritus
15	Yohan León	24 January 1995	2.00 m (6 ft 7 in)	98 kg (216 lb)	345 cm (136 in)	340 cm (130 in)	(Cuba) Camagüey
17	Roamy Alonso	24 July 1997	2.01 m (6 ft 7 in)	93 kg (205 lb)	350 cm (140 in)	330 cm (130 in)	(Cuba) Matanzas
18	Miguel Ángel López	25 March 1997	1.89 m (6 ft 2 in)	75 kg (165 lb)	345 cm (136 in)	320 cm (130 in)	(Cuba) Cienfuegos

=== Finland ===
The following is the Finnish roster in the 2018 World Championship.

Head coach: Tuomas Sammelvuo

No.	Name	Date of birth	Height	Weight	Spike	Block	2018–19 club
2	Eemi Tervaportti (c)	26 July 1989	1.93 m (6 ft 4 in)	80 kg (180 lb)	338 cm (133 in)	317 cm (125 in)	(Greece) Olympiacos
3	Mikko Esko	3 September 1978	1.98 m (6 ft 6 in)	89 kg (196 lb)	331 cm (130 in)	319 cm (126 in)	(Finland) Vammalan
4	Lauri Kerminen	18 January 1993	1.85 m (6 ft 1 in)	80 kg (180 lb)	332 cm (131 in)	290 cm (110 in)	(Russia) Kuzbass Kemerovo
6	Antti Ronkainen	11 August 1996	1.89 m (6 ft 2 in)	80 kg (180 lb)	330 cm (130 in)	315 cm (124 in)	(Finland) ETTA
7	Niko Suihkonen	11 April 1999	1.90 m (6 ft 3 in)	86 kg (190 lb)	342 cm (135 in)	320 cm (130 in)	(Finland) Vammalan
8	Elviss Krastins	15 September 1994	1.92 m (6 ft 4 in)	85 kg (187 lb)	340 cm (130 in)	320 cm (130 in)	(France) Arago de Sète
9	Tommi Siirilä	5 August 1993	2.03 m (6 ft 8 in)	102 kg (225 lb)	350 cm (140 in)	325 cm (128 in)	(Italy) Perugia
10	Urpo Sivula	15 March 1988	1.95 m (6 ft 5 in)	100 kg (220 lb)	350 cm (140 in)	330 cm (130 in)	(Finland) Vammalan
11	Sauli Sinkkonen	14 September 1989	2.01 m (6 ft 7 in)	94 kg (207 lb)	345 cm (136 in)	330 cm (130 in)	(France) Chaumont
14	Markus Kaurto	31 August 1993	1.96 m (6 ft 5 in)	85 kg (187 lb)	345 cm (136 in)	320 cm (130 in)	(Finland) Vammalan
15	Henrik Porkka	14 January 1998	2.02 m (6 ft 8 in)	82 kg (181 lb)	360 cm (140 in)	330 cm (130 in)	(Finland) Hurrikaani Loimaa
16	Samuli Kaislasalo	3 August 1995	2.03 m (6 ft 8 in)	94 kg (207 lb)	350 cm (140 in)	325 cm (128 in)	(Finland) LEKA
19	Niklas Breilin	8 September 1999	1.78 m (5 ft 10 in)	69 kg (152 lb)	320 cm (130 in)	310 cm (120 in)	(Finland) Kuortane
22	Sakari Mäkinen	19 January 1995	1.88 m (6 ft 2 in)	78 kg (172 lb)	335 cm (132 in)	320 cm (130 in)	(Belarus) Shakhtyor Soligorsk

=== Iran ===
The following is the Iranian roster in the 2018 World Championship.

Head coach: Igor Kolaković

No.	Name	Date of birth	Height	Weight	Spike	Block	2018–19 club
2	Milad Ebadipour	17 October 1993	1.96 m (6 ft 5 in)	78 kg (172 lb)	350 cm (140 in)	310 cm (120 in)	(Poland) Skra Bełchatów
3	Saman Faezi	23 August 1991	2.04 m (6 ft 8 in)	87 kg (192 lb)	343 cm (135 in)	335 cm (132 in)	(Iran) Saipa
4	Saeid Marouf (c)	20 October 1985	1.89 m (6 ft 2 in)	81 kg (179 lb)	331 cm (130 in)	311 cm (122 in)	(Iran) Paykan
5	Farhad Ghaemi	28 August 1989	1.97 m (6 ft 6 in)	73 kg (161 lb)	355 cm (140 in)	335 cm (132 in)	(Iran) Paykan
6	Mohammad Mousavi	22 August 1987	2.03 m (6 ft 8 in)	86 kg (190 lb)	362 cm (143 in)	344 cm (135 in)	(Iran) Sarmayeh Tehran
10	Amir Ghafour	6 June 1991	2.02 m (6 ft 8 in)	90 kg (200 lb)	354 cm (139 in)	334 cm (131 in)	(Iran) Saipa
11	Saber Kazemi	24 December 1998	2.05 m (6 ft 9 in)	87 kg (192 lb)	340 cm (130 in)	325 cm (128 in)	(Iran) Shams Tehran
14	Mohammad Javad Manavinejad	27 November 1995	1.98 m (6 ft 6 in)	94 kg (207 lb)	340 cm (130 in)	320 cm (130 in)	(Italy) Verona
16	Ali Shafiei	21 September 1991	1.90 m (6 ft 3 in)	80 kg (180 lb)	348 cm (137 in)	345 cm (136 in)	(Iran) Sarmayeh Tehran
18	Mohammad Taher Vadi	10 October 1989	1.94 m (6 ft 4 in)	72 kg (159 lb)	329 cm (130 in)	315 cm (124 in)	(Iran) Ardakan
19	Mehdi Marandi	12 May 1986	1.72 m (5 ft 8 in)	69 kg (152 lb)	295 cm (116 in)	280 cm (110 in)	(Iran) Sarmayeh Tehran
21	Morteza Sharifi	27 May 1999	1.93 m (6 ft 4 in)	83 kg (183 lb)	340 cm (130 in)	320 cm (130 in)	(Iran) Shams Tehran
24	Mohammad Reza Hazratpour	31 March 1999	1.87 m (6 ft 2 in)	87 kg (192 lb)	300 cm (120 in)	290 cm (110 in)	(Iran) Shams Tehran
25	Amir Hossein Toukhteh	9 April 2001	2.03 m (6 ft 8 in)	79 kg (174 lb)	350 cm (140 in)	325 cm (128 in)	(Iran) Shams Tehran

=== Poland ===
The following is the Polish roster in the 2018 World Championship.

Head coach: Vital Heynen

No.	Name	Date of birth	Height	Weight	Spike	Block	2018–19 club
1	Piotr Nowakowski	18 December 1987	2.05 m (6 ft 9 in)	90 kg (200 lb)	355 cm (140 in)	340 cm (130 in)	(Poland) Gdańsk
3	Dawid Konarski	31 August 1989	1.98 m (6 ft 6 in)	93 kg (205 lb)	353 cm (139 in)	320 cm (130 in)	(Poland) Jastrzębski Węgiel
6	Bartosz Kurek	29 August 1988	2.05 m (6 ft 9 in)	87 kg (192 lb)	352 cm (139 in)	326 cm (128 in)	(Poland) Szczecin
7	Artur Szalpuk	20 March 1995	2.01 m (6 ft 7 in)	93 kg (205 lb)	350 cm (140 in)	335 cm (132 in)	(Poland) Skra Bełchatów
8	Damian Schulz	26 February 1990	2.08 m (6 ft 10 in)	95 kg (209 lb)	355 cm (140 in)	330 cm (130 in)	(Poland) Rzeszów
10	Damian Wojtaszek (L)	7 September 1988	1.80 m (5 ft 11 in)	76 kg (168 lb)	330 cm (130 in)	301 cm (119 in)	(Poland) Warszawa
11	Fabian Drzyzga	3 January 1990	1.96 m (6 ft 5 in)	90 kg (200 lb)	325 cm (128 in)	304 cm (120 in)	(Russia) Lokomotiv Novosibirsk
12	Grzegorz Łomacz	1 October 1987	1.87 m (6 ft 2 in)	80 kg (180 lb)	335 cm (132 in)	315 cm (124 in)	(Poland) Skra Bełchatów
13	Michał Kubiak (c)	23 February 1988	1.91 m (6 ft 3 in)	80 kg (180 lb)	328 cm (129 in)	312 cm (123 in)	(Japan) Panasonic Panthers
14	Aleksander Śliwka	24 May 1995	1.96 m (6 ft 5 in)	88 kg (194 lb)	340 cm (130 in)	315 cm (124 in)	(Poland) Kędzierzyn-Koźle
15	Jakub Kochanowski	17 July 1997	1.99 m (6 ft 6 in)	89 kg (196 lb)	353 cm (139 in)	323 cm (127 in)	(Poland) Skra Bełchatów
17	Paweł Zatorski (L)	21 June 1990	1.84 m (6 ft 0 in)	73 kg (161 lb)	328 cm (129 in)	304 cm (120 in)	(Poland) Kędzierzyn-Koźle
18	Bartosz Kwolek	17 July 1997	1.92 m (6 ft 4 in)	91 kg (201 lb)	343 cm (135 in)	310 cm (120 in)	(Poland) Warszawa
20	Mateusz Bieniek	5 April 1994	2.10 m (6 ft 11 in)	98 kg (216 lb)	351 cm (138 in)	326 cm (128 in)	(Poland) Kędzierzyn-Koźle

=== Puerto Rico ===
The following is the Puerto Rican roster in the 2018 World Championship.

Head coach: Oswald Antonetti

No.	Name	Date of birth	Height	Weight	Spike	Block	2018–19 club
2	Edgardo Goás	27 January 1989	1.97 m (6 ft 6 in)	95 kg (209 lb)	345 cm (136 in)	330 cm (130 in)	(Puerto Rico) Capitanes de Arecibo
3	Pablo Guzmán	2 June 1987	1.88 m (6 ft 2 in)	67 kg (148 lb)	292 cm (115 in)	288 cm (113 in)	(Puerto Rico) Mets de Guaynabo
4	Dennis Del Valle	27 January 1989	1.75 m (5 ft 9 in)	58 kg (128 lb)	300 cm (120 in)	290 cm (110 in)	(Puerto Rico) Mets de Guaynabo
5	Pedro Nieves	29 June 1993	1.98 m (6 ft 6 in)	92 kg (203 lb)	312 cm (123 in)	305 cm (120 in)	Free agent
6	Ángel Pérez (c)	20 May 1982	1.90 m (6 ft 3 in)	86 kg (190 lb)	325 cm (128 in)	318 cm (125 in)	(Puerto Rico) Mets de Guaynabo
8	Eddie Rivera	16 June 1992	1.81 m (5 ft 11 in)	69 kg (152 lb)	248 cm (98 in)	242 cm (95 in)	(Puerto Rico) Mets de Guaynabo
10	Ezequiel Cruz	15 July 1986	1.91 m (6 ft 3 in)	85 kg (187 lb)	333 cm (131 in)	326 cm (128 in)	(Puerto Rico) Capitanes de Arecibo
11	Maurice Torres	6 July 1991	2.01 m (6 ft 7 in)	100 kg (220 lb)	305 cm (120 in)	299 cm (118 in)	(Puerto Rico) Capitanes de Arecibo
13	Sequiel Sánchez	24 March 1990	1.91 m (6 ft 3 in)	89 kg (196 lb)	325 cm (128 in)	305 cm (120 in)	(Puerto Rico) Changos de Naranjito
14	Juan Vázquez	23 January 1991	1.88 m (6 ft 2 in)	82 kg (181 lb)	298 cm (117 in)	292 cm (115 in)	(Puerto Rico) Indios de Mayagüez
15	Jonathan Rodríguez	16 September 1997	1.93 m (6 ft 4 in)	82 kg (181 lb)	243 cm (96 in)	238 cm (94 in)	Free agent
17	Jessie Colón	20 September 1984	1.92 m (6 ft 4 in)	74 kg (163 lb)	247 cm (97 in)	242 cm (95 in)	(Puerto Rico) Patriotas de Lares
22	Pedrito Sierra	21 July 1989	1.96 m (6 ft 5 in)	89 kg (196 lb)	305 cm (120 in)	298 cm (117 in)	(Puerto Rico) Cariduros de Fajardo
24	Arnel Cabrera	11 October 1994	1.89 m (6 ft 2 in)	79 kg (174 lb)	245 cm (96 in)	239 cm (94 in)	(Puerto Rico) Mets de Guaynabo

== See also ==
- 2018 FIVB Volleyball Women's World Championship squads
