= 2017–18 Divizia A1 (men's volleyball) =

Divizia A1
- Teams: 12

Regular season
- Promoted: Piatra Neamț; Câmpia Turzii
- Relegated: UV Timișoara; CSS 2 Baia Mare

Finals
- Champions: Tricolorul LMV Ploiești (1st title)
- Runners-up: Arcada Galați
- Third place: Steaua București
- Fourth place: VM Zalău

The 2017–18 Divizia A1 season was the 69th season of the Divizia A1, the highest professional volleyball league in Romania. VM Zalău was the defending champion. At the end of the season, Tricolorul LMV Ploiești won their first title. UV Timișoara and CSS 2 Baia Mare were relegated.

== Competition format ==
The competition format will be the same as in the previous season.

- 12 teams played the regular season, consisting in a double-legged round robin format.
- At the end of the regular season, teams are split into two groups, one of them composed by the first six teams and the other one by the rest. In this second stage all points of the regular season are counted and the teams will face each other from its group twice.

== Team changes ==
Promoted from Divizia A2

- Universitatea Cluj
- CSS 2 Baia Mare
- UV Timișoara

Relegated to Divizia A2

- VCM Piatra Neamț

=== Excluded teams ===
Știința Bacău and Volei Caransebeș withdrew from Divizia A1.

== Teams ==
Location of teams in 2017–18 Divizia A1

Team	City	Arena	Capacity
Arcada	Galați	Dunărea	1,500
CSM	București	Sala Elite	500
CSS 2	Baia Mare	Lascăr Pană	2,048
Dinamo	București	Dinamo	2,538
SCM U	Craiova	Polyvalent Hall	4,215
Steaua	București	Mihai Viteazu	2,000
Știința Explorări	Baia Mare	Lascăr Pană	2,048
Tricolorul	Ploiești	Olimpia	3,500
Unirea	Dej	Sala Sporturilor	1,000
Universitatea	Cluj-Napoca	Horia Demian	2,525
UV	Timișoara	Constantin Jude	2,200
VM	Zalău	Sala Sporturilor	950

== Regular season ==
Pos	Team	Pld	W	L	Pts	SW	SL	SR	SPW	SPL	SPR	Qualification
1	Steaua București (Q)	22	20	2	59	62	13	4.769	1827	1511	1.209	Qualification to Play-off
2	Tricolorul Ploiești (Q)	22	19	3	55	60	19	3.158	1865	1518	1.229	Qualification to Play-off
3	Arcada Galați (Q)	22	17	5	52	57	25	2.280	1914	1649	1.161	Qualification to Play-off
4	Zalău (Q)	22	15	7	43	51	29	1.759	1814	1644	1.103	Qualification to Play-off
5	CSM București (Q)	22	14	8	41	47	33	1.424	1801	1718	1.048	Qualification to Play-off
6	U Craiova (Q)	22	13	9	39	43	30	1.433	1709	1540	1.110	Qualification to Play-off
7	Dinamo București (Q)	22	9	13	28	38	44	0.864	1769	1832	0.966	Qualification to Play-out
8	Știința Explorări (Q)	22	9	13	28	35	47	0.745	1746	1826	0.956	Qualification to Play-out
9	Unirea Dej (Q)	22	8	14	27	39	48	0.813	1885	1876	1.005	Qualification to Play-out
10	Universitatea Cluj (Q)	22	4	18	14	21	55	0.382	1498	1760	0.851	Qualification to Play-out
11	CSS 2 Baia Mare (Q)	22	3	19	7	10	62	0.161	1264	1745	0.724	Qualification to Play-out
12	UV Timișoara (Q)	22	1	21	3	6	64	0.094	1257	1730	0.727	Qualification to Play-out

Source: Romanian Volleyball Federation
(Q) Qualified for the phase indicated

== Play-off ==
Pos	Team	Pld	W	L	Pts	SW	SL	SR	SPW	SPL	SPR	Qualification
1	Tricolorul Ploiești (C, Q)	32	27	5	77	87	31	2.806	2771	2325	1.192	Qualification to CEV Cup
2	Arcada Galați (Q)	32	26	6	76	84	36	2.333	2794	2445	1.143	Qualification to CEV Cup
3	Steaua București (Q)	32	23	9	69	78	36	2.167	2679	2390	1.121	Qualification to CEV Challenge Cup
4	Zalău (Q)	32	19	13	58	69	50	1.380	2667	2523	1.057	Qualification to CEV Challenge Cup
5	CSM București (Q)	32	17	15	51	61	57	1.070	2588	2583	1.002	Qualification to CEV Challenge Cup
6	U Craiova	32	16	16	48	55	63	0.873	2461	2344	1.050	

Source: Romanian Volleyball Federation
(C) Champion; (Q) Qualified for the phase indicated

== Play-out ==
Pos	Team	Pld	W	L	Pts	SW	SL	SR	SPW	SPL	SPR	Qualification
7	Dinamo București	22	18	4	55	65	53	1.226	2649	2568	1.032	
8	Știința Explorări	23	17	6	51	61	56	1.089	2582	2529	1.021	
9	Unirea Dej	27	15	12	48	64	62	1.032	2766	2675	1.034	
10	Universitatea Cluj	13	7	6	24	35	77	0.455	2274	2599	0.875	
11	UV Timișoara (R)	4	4	0	12	18	85	0.212	1942	2492	0.779	Relegation to Divizia A2
12	CSS 2 Baia Mare (R)	3	3	0	7	11	92	0.120	1836	2536	0.724	Relegation to Divizia A2

Source: Romanian Volleyball Federation
(R) Relegated
