= 2007 Boys' Youth European Volleyball Championship Squads =

This article shows all participating team squads at the 2007 Boys' Youth European Volleyball Championship, held in Austria from 11–16 April 2007.

== Austria ==
The following is the Austria roster in the 2007 Boys' Youth European Volleyball Championship.

Head coach:

No.	Name	Date of birth
	Rene Decrinis	10 May 1989
	Jan Feichtinger	28 February 1989
	Marcus Guttmann	9 July 1991
	Jörg Haidbauer	18 October 1989
	Fabian Liebel	19 August 1990
	Florian Mairhofer	17 June 1989
	Daniel Mullner	2 February 1990
	Lucas Schachinger	12 April 1989
	Marcus Tröthann	28 November 1989
	Peter Wohlfahrtstatter	10 March 1989
	Dimitri Wojakow	2 January 1989
	Thomas Zass	27 November 1989

== Belgium ==
The following is the Belgium roster in the 2007 Boys' Youth European Volleyball Championship.

Head coach: Julien Van De Vyver

No.	Name	Date of birth
	Robin De Bont	29 April 1990
	Stefaan De Brabandere	16 January 1990
	Leonard De Schrijver	29 March 1990
	Kevin Klinkenberg	4 October 1990
	Yves Kruyner	10 May 1990
	Matthias Valkiers	8 April 1990
	Mathias Van Damme	8 June 1989
	Bram Van Den Dries	14 August 1989
	Kenneth Van Goethem	4 February 1989
	Ruben Van Hirtum	10 April 1990
	Pieter Verhees	8 December 1989

== Estonia ==
The following is the Estonia roster in the 2007 Boys' Youth European Volleyball Championship.

Head coach: Raul Reiter

No.	Name	Date of birth
	Siim Ennemuist	5 December 1989
	Oliver Kallion	3 May 1989
	Meelis Kivisild	28 July 1990
	Kristo Kollo	17 January 1990
	Tauno Lipp	22 March 1989
	Edgar Maier	9 February 1989
	Hardi Paas	29 May 1989
	Siim Polluaar	30 May 1989
	Kaarel Pomerants	6 November 1989
	Tavi Sadam	4 July 1990
	Kaido Treima	20 March 1989
	Oliver Venno	23 May 1990

== France ==
The following is the France roster in the 2007 Boys' Youth European Volleyball Championship.

Head coach:

No.	Name	Date of birth
	Frédéric Barais	10 December 1989
	Cédric Benoit	11 November 1989
	Raphaël Corre	21 November 1989
	Martin Jambon	10 June 1989
	Ivan Kartev	14 August 1990
	Youssef Krou	19 June 1989
	Nicolas Le Jeune	16 May 1989
	Kevin Le Roux	11 May 1989
	Cyril Marquois	13 April 1989
	Earvin N'Gapeth	12 February 1991
	Guillaume Quesque	29 April 1989
	Benjamin Toniutti	30 October 1989

== Germany ==
The following is the Germany roster in the 2007 Boys' Youth European Volleyball Championship.

Head coach: Stewart Bernard

No.	Name	Date of birth
	Lukas Bauer	26 February 1989
	Carlos Capote	28 June 1989
	Christian Fromm	15 August 1990
	Felix Isaak	2 September 1989
	Denys Kaliberda	24 June 1990
	Fabian Kohl	3 July 1989
	Evgeny Metelskiy	23 December 1990
	Marvin Prolingheuer	29 June 1990
	Santino Rost	26 June 1990
	Alexander Schneider	2 July 1989
	Markus Steuerwald	7 March 1989
	Jonas Umlauft	10 April 1990

== Italy ==
The following is the Italy roster in the 2007 Boys' Youth European Volleyball Championship.

Head coach: Mario Barbiero

No.	Name	Date of birth
	Michele Baranowicz	5 August 1989
	Alessandro Bartoli	4 September 1989
	Matteo Bortolozzo	1 August 1989
	Ludovico Dolfo	30 June 1989
	Davis Krumins	28 June 1990
	Federico Marretta	9 August 1990
	Carlo Mor	11 June 1989
	Giovanni Maria Musillo	10 January 1989
	Andrea Rossi	14 February 1989
	Giulio Sabbi	10 August 1989
	Matteo Segnalini	30 May 1989
	Giuseppe Zito	30 November 1989

== Latvia ==
The following is the Latvia roster in the 2007 Boys' Youth European Volleyball Championship.

Head coach: Boriss Colokjans

No.	Name	Date of birth
	Vitalijs Cinne	2 August 1989
	Hermans Egleskalns	8 December 1990
	Aleksandrs Gedzjuns	22 October 1989
	Jevgenijs Grigorjevs	25 February 1989
	Martins Krams	20 May 1989
	Rihards Pukitis	20 October 1989
	Artjoms Puskarjovs	8 January 1989
	Aleksandrs Samuilovs	26 August 1989
	Romans Sauss	27 June 1989
	Tomass Tubelskis	3 August 1989
	Eriks Voronko	31 December 1990

== Netherlands ==
The following is the Nederlands roster in the 2007 Boys' Youth European Volleyball Championship.

Head coach: Peter Van Den Berg

No.	Name	Date of birth
	Robbert Andringa	28 April 1990
	Ryan Anselma	12 January 1989
	Marc De Boer	25 June 1989
	Ewoud Gomans	17 January 1990
	Gijs Jorna	30 May 1990
	Ralph Koomen	20 February 1989
	Robin Oveerbeeke	21 March 1989
	Brian Schouren	23 November 1990
	Dirk Sparidans	5 March 1989
	Sebastiaan Van Bemmelen	18 August 1989
	Maarten Van Garderen	24 January 1990
	Daan Van Haarlem	15 March 1989

== Poland ==
The following is the Poland roster in the 2007 Boys' Youth European Volleyball Championship.

Head coach: Karol Janaszewski

No.	Name	Date of birth
	Fabian Drzyzga	3 January 1990
	Mateusz Jasiński	31 January 1989
	Przemysław Kasparek	28 January 1989
	Karol Kłos	8 August 1989
	Jan Król	23 August 1989
	Maciej Krzywiecki	27 October 1989
	Mateusz Mika	21 January 1991
	Michał Paniaczyk	9 July 1989
	Szymon Piórkowski	3 April 1989
	Łukasz Polański	29 January 1989
	Łukasz Wroński	22 March 1989
	Paweł Zatorski	21 June 1990

== Russia ==
The following is the Russia roster in the 2007 Boys' Youth European Volleyball Championship.

Head coach: Andrey Voronkov

No.	Name	Date of birth
	Valentin Bezrukov	26 January 1990
	Anton Botin	8 July 1990
	Sergey Burtsev	23 February 1989
	Danill Dubnitskiy	
	Levan Kalandadze	28 December 1989
	Dmitriy Kovyryaev	6 April 1989
	Alexander Markin	28 July 1990
	Denis Medvedev	25 May 1989
	Ruslan Moskvin	20 November 1989
	Konstantin Semenov	9 June 1989
	Dmitry Shcherbinin	10 September 1989

== Serbia ==
The following is the Serbia roster in the 2007 Boys' Youth European Volleyball Championship.

Head coach: Ljubomir Galogaza

No.	Name	Date of birth
	Stefan Basta	28 March 1990
	Uros Drapsin	18 January 1989
	Jovan Janković	17 April 1990
	Nikola Karić	2 February 1989
	Neven Majstorović	17 March 1989
	Mihajlo Mitić	17 September 1990
	Marko Nikolić	22 June 1990
	Mihailo Pajić	19 November 1989
	Dino Radivojević	8 August 1989
	Marko Samardzic	20 June 1989
	Nemanja Stefanović	12 February 1989
	Nikola Vasić	4 June 1989

== Turkey ==
The following is the Turkey roster in the 2007 Boys' Youth European Volleyball Championship.

Head coach: Ali Kazim Hidayetoglu

No.	Name	Date of birth
	Özgür Ramis Ali	5 January 1989
	Salih Bircan	8 January 1990
	Metin Durmus	5 February 1989
	Muhammet Ertugrul	8 December 1989
	Murathan Kisal	22 November 1989
	Burak Konus	11 June 1989
	Hakan Polat	11 November 1989
	Server Baris Sancak	24 August 1989
	Burutay Subasi	15 July 1990
	Sadi Yanki Uslu	17 April 1989
	Celil Yavuz	22 February 1990
	Mustafa Gökalp Yoldas	27 May 1990
