= 2018–19 Divizia A1 (men's volleyball) =

Divizia A1
- Teams: 12

Regular season
- Relegated: Piatra Neamț; Tricolorul Ploiești

Finals
- Champions: Arcada Galați (1st title)
- Runners-up: Zalău
- Third place: U Craiova
- Fourth place: Dinamo București

The 2018–19 Divizia A1 season was the 70th season of the Divizia A1, the highest professional volleyball league in Romania. Tricolorul LMV Ploiești was the defending champion. At the end of the season, Arcada Galați won their first title. VCM Piatra Neamț and Tricolorul Ploiești were relegated.

== Competition format ==
The competition format will be the same as in the previous season.

- 12 teams played the regular season, consisting in a double-legged round robin format.
- At the end of the regular season, teams are split into two groups, one of them composed by the first six teams and the other one by the rest. In this second stage all points of the regular season are counted and the teams will face each other from its group twice.

== Team changes ==
Promoted from Divizia A2

- VCM Piatra Neamț
- CSM Câmpia Turzii

Relegated to Divizia A2

- UV Timișoara
- CSS 2 Baia Mare

== Teams ==
Location of teams in 2018–19 Divizia A1

Team	City	Arena	Capacity
Arcada	Galați	Dunărea	1,500
CSM	București	Sala Elite	500
CSM	Câmpia Turzii	Ioan Stanatiev	200
Dinamo	București	Dinamo	2,538
SCM U	Craiova	Polyvalent Hall	4,215
Steaua	București	Mihai Viteazu	2,000
Știința Explorări	Baia Mare	Lascăr Pană	2,048
Tricolorul	Ploiești	Olimpia	3,500
Unirea	Dej	Sala Sporturilor	1,000
Universitatea	Cluj-Napoca	Horia Demian	2,525
VCM	Piatra Neamț	Sala Polivalentă	4,000
VM	Zalău	Sala Sporturilor	950

== Regular season ==
Pos	Team	Pld	W	L	Pts	SW	SL	SR	SPW	SPL	SPR	Qualification
1	Zalău	19	16	3	47	52	16	3.250	1628	1404	1.160	Qualification to Play-off
2	U Craiova	19	16	3	46	50	16	3.125	1550	1363	1.137	Qualification to Play-off
3	Arcada Galați	19	15	4	46	51	18	2.833	1672	1342	1.246	Qualification to Play-off
4	CSM București	19	11	8	35	39	27	1.444	1541	1410	1.093	Qualification to Play-off
5	Dinamo București	19	12	7	34	40	32	1.250	1654	1570	1.054	Qualification to Play-off
6	Steaua București	19	11	8	29	37	35	1.057	1607	1610	0.998	Qualification to Play-off
7	Unirea Dej	19	9	10	28	35	36	0.972	1564	1589	0.984	Qualification to Play-out
8	Știința Explorări	19	4	15	14	20	48	0.417	1379	1607	0.858	Qualification to Play-out
9	Câmpia Turzii	19	5	14	14	19	48	0.396	1350	1562	0.864	Qualification to Play-out
10	Universitatea Cluj	19	1	18	7	16	55	0.291	1418	1665	0.852	Qualification to Play-out
11	Piatra Neamț (R)	10	0	10	0 (Note: Piatra Neamț withdrew from the championship during the winter break and the rest of the matches were canceled.)	2	30	0.067	554	795	0.697	Relegation to Divizia A2
12	Tricolorul Ploiești (E)	0	0	0	0 (Note: Tricolorul Ploiești withdrew from the championship in the first part of the season and all their results were canceled.)	0	0	—	0	0	—	Withdrew

Source: Romanian Volleyball Federation
(E) Eliminated; (R) Relegated

== Play-off ==
Pos	Team	Pld	W	L	Pts	SW	SL	SR	SPW	SPL	SPR	Qualification
1	Arcada Galați (C, Q)	28	22	6	68	76	30	2.533	2517	2093	1.203	Qualification to CEV Cup
2	Zalău (Q)	28	23	5	66	75	28	2.679	2437	2155	1.131	Qualification to CEV Cup
3	U Craiova (Q)	28	21	7	61	68	33	2.061	2328	2096	1.111	Qualification to CEV Challenge Cup
4	Dinamo București (Q)	28	16	12	46	57	49	1.163	2380	2333	1.020	Qualification to CEV Challenge Cup
5	CSM București (Q)	28	14	14	45	52	47	1.106	2272	2171	1.047	Qualification to CEV Challenge Cup
6	Steaua București	28	12	16	32	44	60	0.733	2258	2391	0.944	

Source: Romanian Volleyball Federation
(C) Champion; (Q) Qualified for the phase indicated

== Play-out ==
Pos	Team	Pld	W	L	Pts	SW	SL	SR	SPW	SPL	SPR
7	Unirea Dej	25	13	12	41	50	45	1.111	2113	2099	1.007
8	Știința Explorări	25	8	17	26	37	56	0.661	1944	2131	0.912
9	Câmpia Turzii	25	7	18	19	29	62	0.468	1871	2093	0.894
10	Universitatea Cluj	25	2	23	10	21	71	0.296	1865	2182	0.855

Source: Romanian Volleyball Federation
