= SCM U Craiova =

SCM U Craiova may refer to:

- SCM U Craiova (basketball), a men's basketball club
- SCM U Craiova (men's volleyball), a men's volleyball club
