= 2022–23 CEV Champions League qualification =

This article shows the qualification phase for the 2022–23 CEV Champions League. 11 teams play in the qualification round. The two remaining teams will join the other 18 teams automatically qualified for the League round. All 9 eliminated teams will compete in the 2022–23 CEV Cup.

== Participating teams ==
The Drawing of Lots took place on 28 June 2022 in Luxembourg City.

Rank	Country	Team(s)	Outcome (Qualified to)
12	Croatia	Mladost Zagreb	CEV Cup
13	Portugal	Sport Lisboa e Benfica	CEV Champions League
14	Finland	Ford Levoranta Sastamala	CEV Cup
15	Romania	CS Arcada Galați	CEV Cup
16	Bulgaria	Hebar Pazardzhik	CEV Champions League
17	Austria	SK Zadruga Aich/Dob	CEV Cup
20	Netherlands	Dynamo Apeldoorn	CEV Cup
21	Switzerland	Lindaren Volley Amriswil	CEV Cup
23	Bosnia and Herzegovina	Mladost Brčko	CEV Cup
25	Montenegro	OK Budva	CEV Cup
47	North Macedonia	Strumica Nikob	CEV Cup

== First round ==
- All times are local.

Team 1	Agg.	Team 2	1st leg	2nd leg	Golden Set
OK Budva (Montenegro)	0–6	(Austria) SK Zadruga Aich/Dob	0–3	1–3	
Dynamo Apeldoorn (Netherlands)	3–3	(North Macedonia) Strumica Nikob	3–0	1–3	15–13
	Bye	(Bulgaria) Hebar Pazardzhik			
Mladost Brčko (Bosnia and Herzegovina)	0–6	(Switzerland) Lindaren Volley Amriswil	0–3	0–3	

=== First leg ===
Date	Time		Score		Set 1	Set 2	Set 3	Set 4	Set 5	Total	Report
20 Sep	18:00	OK Budva (Montenegro)	0–3	(Austria) SK Zadruga Aich/Dob	19–25	15–25	21–25			55–75	Report
20 Sep	19:30	Dynamo Apeldoorn (Netherlands)	3–0	(North Macedonia) Strumica Nikob	25–20	25–13	25–16			75–49	Report
21 Sep	19:00	Mladost Brčko (Bosnia and Herzegovina)	0–3	(Switzerland) Lindaren Volley Amriswil	12–25	13–25	10–25			35–75	Report

=== Second leg ===
Date	Time		Score		Set 1	Set 2	Set 3	Set 4	Set 5	Total	Report
27 Sep	18:00	SK Zadruga Aich/Dob (Austria)	3–1	(Montenegro) OK Budva	37–35	25–27	25–21	25–18		112–101	Report
27 Sep	19:00	Strumica Nikob (North Macedonia)	3–1	(Netherlands) Dynamo Apeldoorn	22–25	27–25	25–23	25–21		99–94	Report
Golden set		Strumica Nikob (North Macedonia)	13–15	(Netherlands) Dynamo Apeldoorn							
28 Sep	19:00	Lindaren Volley Amriswil (Switzerland)	3–0	(Bosnia and Herzegovina) Mladost Brčko	25–12	25–9	25–13			75–34	Report

== Second round ==
- All times are local.

Team 1	Agg.	Team 2	1st leg	2nd leg	Golden Set
SK Zadruga Aich/Dob (Austria)	2–4	(Finland) Ford Levoranta Sastamala	3–2	1–3	
Dynamo Apeldoorn (Netherlands)	0–6	(Portugal) Sport Lisboa e Benfica	1–3	0–3	
Hebar Pazardzhik (Bulgaria)	3–3	(Romania) CS Arcada Galați	0–3	3–1	15–10
Lindaren Volley Amriswil (Switzerland)	3–3	(Croatia) Mladost Zagreb	3–1	0–3	8–15

=== First leg ===
Date	Time		Score		Set 1	Set 2	Set 3	Set 4	Set 5	Total	Report
5 Oct	18:00	SK Zadruga Aich/Dob (Austria)	3–2	(Finland) Ford Levoranta Sastamala	16–25	25–20	25–23	22–25	19–17	107–110	Report
4 Oct	19:30	Dynamo Apeldoorn (Netherlands)	1–3	(Portugal) Sport Lisboa e Benfica	12–25	25–20	18–25	12–25		67–95	Report
5 Oct	19:00	Hebar Pazardzhik (Bulgaria)	0–3	(Romania) CS Arcada Galați	22–25	19–25	24–26			65–76	Report
5 Oct	19:00	Lindaren Volley Amriswil (Switzerland)	3–1	(Croatia) Mladost Zagreb	25–18	19–25	25–21	25–22		94–86	Report

=== Second leg ===
Date	Time		Score		Set 1	Set 2	Set 3	Set 4	Set 5	Total	Report
13 Oct	18:30	Ford Levoranta Sastamala (Finland)	3–1	(Austria) SK Zadruga Aich/Dob	25–16	23–25	25–17	25–23		98–81	Report
12 Oct	20:00	Sport Lisboa e Benfica (Portugal)	3–0	(Netherlands) Dynamo Apeldoorn	31–29	25–16	25–21			81–66	Report
12 Oct	18:00	CS Arcada Galați (Romania)	1–3	(Bulgaria) Hebar Pazardzhik	25–27	23–25	25–17	22–25		95–94	Report
Golden set		CS Arcada Galați (Romania)	10–15	(Bulgaria) Hebar Pazardzhik							
13 Oct	20:30	Mladost Zagreb (Croatia)	3–0	(Switzerland) Lindaren Volley Amriswil	25–22	25–22	25–21			75–65	Report
Golden set		Mladost Zagreb (Croatia)	15–8	(Switzerland) Lindaren Volley Amriswil							

== Third round ==
- All times are local.

Team 1	Agg.	Team 2	1st leg	2nd leg
Ford Levoranta Sastamala (Finland)	0–6	(Portugal) Sport Lisboa e Benfica	1–3	1–3
Hebar Pazardzhik (Bulgaria)	6–0	(Croatia) Mladost Zagreb	3–1	3–1

=== First leg ===
Date	Time		Score		Set 1	Set 2	Set 3	Set 4	Set 5	Total	Report
20 Oct	18:30	Ford Levoranta Sastamala (Finland)	1–3	(Portugal) Sport Lisboa e Benfica	21–25	25–21	22–25	17–25		85–96	Report
19 Oct	19:00	Hebar Pazardzhik (Bulgaria)	3–1	(Croatia) Mladost Zagreb	25–27	25–21	25–14	25–15		100–77	Report

=== Second leg ===
Date	Time		Score		Set 1	Set 2	Set 3	Set 4	Set 5	Total	Report
26 Oct	20:00	Sport Lisboa e Benfica (Portugal)	3–1	(Finland) Ford Levoranta Sastamala	25–16	20–25	25–23	25–18		95–82	Report
27 Oct	19:00	Mladost Zagreb (Croatia)	1–3	(Bulgaria) Hebar Pazardzhik	28–26	20–25	17–25	10–25		75–101	Report
