= Porkka =

Porkka is a Finnish surname. Notable people with the surname include:

- Henrik Porkka (born 1998), Finnish volleyball player
- Toni Porkka (born 1970), Finnish ice hockey player
