= Divizia A1 =

Divizia A1 may refer to:

- Divizia A1 (women's volleyball), Romania
- Divizia A1 (men's volleyball), Romania
