= Gijs Jorna =

Dutch volleyball player (born 1989)

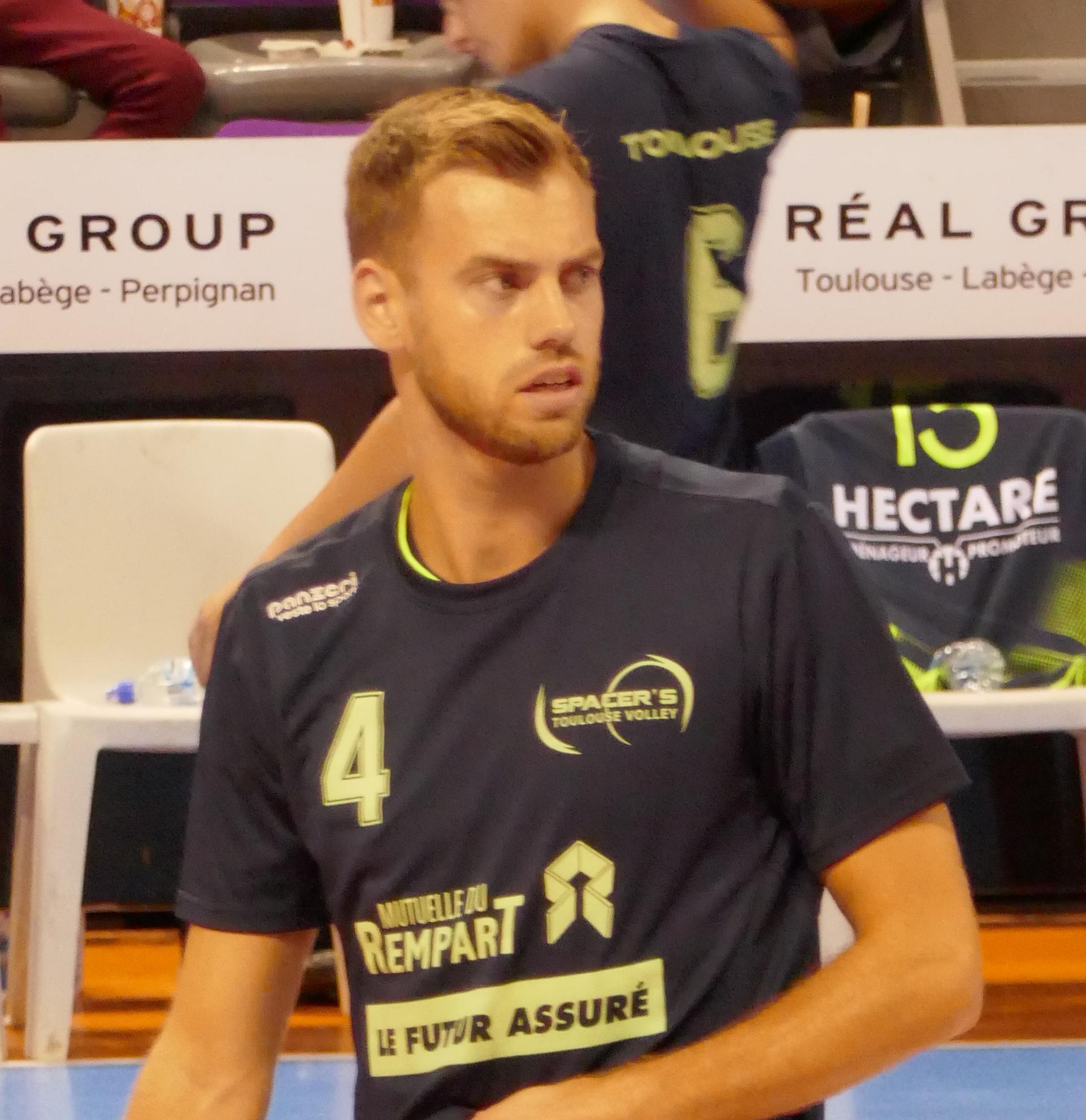
- Gijs Jorna with Spacers'

Personal information
- Nationality: Dutch
- Born: 30 May 1989 (age 37); Enkhuizen, Netherlands
- Height: 196 cm (6 ft 5 in)
- Weight: 85 kg (187 lb)
- Spike: 340 cm (134 in)
- Block: 310 cm (122 in)

Volleyball information
- Position: libero, outside hitter
- Current club: P.A.O.K. Thessaloniki
- Number: 7 (national team)

Career
| Years | Teams |
|---|---|
| 2006-2010; 2010-2011; 2011-2015; 2015-2016; 2016-2017; 2017-2018; 2018-2022; 2022-2023 | (Netherlands) HvA Volleybal (France) Saint-Quentin Volley (Belgium) Topvolley Antwerpen (Belgium) Noliko Maaseik (France) Chaumont Volley-Ball 52 (Romania) Tricolorul LMV Ploiești (France) Spacer's Toulouse Volley (Greece) P.A.O.K. Thessaloniki |

National team
| 2012- | Netherlands |

Gijs Jorna (born 30 May 1989) is a Dutch volleyball player. He is part of the Netherlands men's national volleyball team. He was voted best libero at the 2012 Men's European Volleyball League. On club level he played for Topvolley Precura Antwerpen in Belgium. He participated at the 2017 Men's European Volleyball Championship.

== Awards ==
- 2012 Men's European Volleyball League best libero
- CEV Olympic Qualification 2012 Best receiver
- Belgian Liga A 2015/16 Best Spiker
- Belgian Liga A 2015/16 Best Server
- Romanian Divizia A1 2017/18 Most Valuable Player
- Romanian Divizia A1 2017/18 Best Spiker
- French Cup 2019/20 Best Spiker
- French Cup 2019/20 Best Server
