= Urban Toman =

Slovenian volleyball player (born 1997)

Personal information
- Nationality: Slovenian
- Born: 21 October 1997 (age 29) Jesenice, Slovenia
- Height: 1.85 m (6 ft 1 in)
- Weight: 82 kg (181 lb)
- Spike: 310 cm (122 in)
- Block: 293 cm (115 in)

Volleyball information
- Position: Libero
- Current club: CS Arcada Galați

Career
- Years: Team
- 2015–2016 2016–2018 2018–2019 2019–2020 2020–2021 2021–2023 2023–: OK Žirovnica; OK Triglav Kranj; Helios Grizzlys Giesen; United Volleys Frankfurt; ACH Volley; OK Budva; CS Arcada Galați

National team
- Years: Team
- Slovenia
Honours
Men's volleyball
Representing Slovenia
CEV European Championship
Bronze medal – third place	2023 Italy/Bulgaria/North Macedonia/Israel

Urban Toman (born 21 October 1997) is a Slovenian volleyball player who plays for CS Arcada Galați and the Slovenia national team.

He participated at the 2017 Men's European Volleyball Championship.
