= Simon Van de Voorde =

Belgian volleyball player (born 1989)

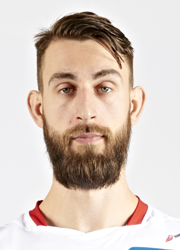

Personal information
- Born: 19 December 1989 (age 36); Leuven, Belgium
- Height: 2.08 m (6 ft 10 in)
- Weight: 100 kg (220 lb)
- Spike: 365 cm (144 in)
- Block: 350 cm (138 in)

Volleyball information
- Position: Middle blocker

Career
Years	Teams
2008–2009; 2009–2013; 2013–2014; 2014–2015; 2015–2017; 2017–2018; 2018; 2018–2019; 2019–2022; 2022–2024	VC Averbode; Noliko Maaseik; Jastrzębski Węgiel; Top Volley Latina; Trentino Volley; Paykan Tehran; Stocznia Szczecin; Emma Villas Volley; Lindemans Aalst; Axis Guibertin

National team
Belgium
Honours
Men's volleyball
Representing Belgium
European League
Gold medal – first place	2013 Turkey

Simon Van de Voorde (born 19 December 1989) is a Belgian former professional volleyball player. He was part of the Belgium national team at the 2014 World Championship held in Poland.

== Honours ==
=== Club ===
- CEV Champions League
  - 2015–16 – with Diatec Trentino
- CEV Cup
  - 2016–17 – with Diatec Trentino
- Domestic
  - 2009–10 Belgian SuperCup, with Noliko Maaseik
  - 2009–10 Belgian Cup, with Noliko Maaseik
  - 2010–11 Belgian Championship, with Noliko Maaseik
  - 2011–12 Belgian SuperCup, with Noliko Maaseik
  - 2011–12 Belgian Cup, with Noliko Maaseik
  - 2011–12 Belgian Championship, with Noliko Maaseik
  - 2012–13 Belgian SuperCup, with Noliko Maaseik

=== Individual awards ===
- 2010: CEV Cup – Best blocker
