= Miloš Terzić (volleyball) =

Serbian volleyball player

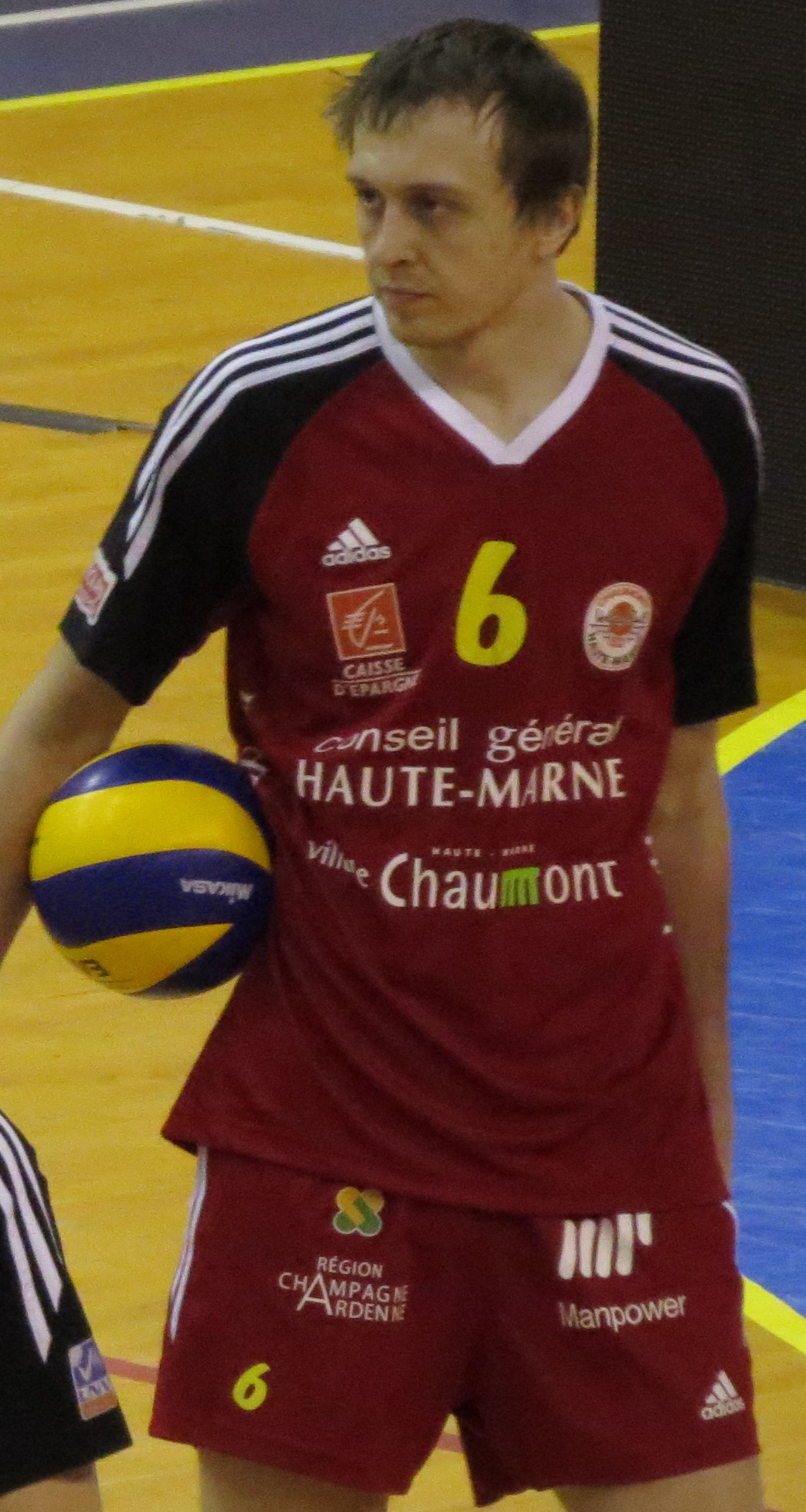

Personal information
- Full name: Miloš Terić
- Nationality: Serbian
- Born: 13 June 1987 (age 39); Lazarevac, SR Montenegro, SFR Yugoslavia
- Height: 2.02 m (6 ft 7 1/2 in)
- Weight: 88 kg (194 lb)
- Spike: 340 cm (130 in)
- Block: 320 cm (130 in)

Volleyball information
- Position: Outside hitter
- Current club: CS Arcada Galați

Career
Years	Teams
2007–2011; 2011–2012; 2012–2013; 2013–2016; 2016–2017; 2017–2018; 2018–	Crvena Zvezda Belgrad; Tours VB; Tomis Constanța; Chaumont VB 52; Nice VB; Cuprum Lubin; CS Arcada Galați

National team
2009–	Serbia
Honours
Men's volleyball
Representing Serbia
World Championship
Bronze medal – third place	2010 Italy
European Championship
Gold medal – first place	2011 Austria/Czech Republic
World League
Silver medal – second place	2009 Belgrade
Bronze medal – third place	2010 Cordoba
- Last updated: 23 July 2017

Miloš Terzić (Serbian: Милош Терзић; born 13 June 1987) is a Serbian volleyball player. He is a member of the Serbia men's national volleyball team and plays for the Romanian club CS Arcada Galați. Terzić is a bronze medalist at the 2010 World Championship, a 2011 European Champion, and has won national championships in Serbian (2008), France (2012) and Romania (2013).

== Career ==
In 2010 Miloš Terzić and the Serbian men's national team won the bronze medal at the FIVB World Championship. Earlier that year, he also earned a bronze at the 2010 FIVB World League. In 2011 he achieved the title of European Champion with Serbia.

In 2017, Terzić joined the Polish PlusLiga club Cuprum Lubin.

== Sporting achievements ==
=== Clubs ===
==== National championships ====
- 2007/2008 Serbian Championship, with Crvena Zvezda Belgrad
- 2008/2009 Serbian Cup, with Crvena Zvezda Belgrad
- 2008/2009 Serbian Championship, with Crvena Zvezda Belgrad
- 2009/2010 Serbian Championship, with Crvena Zvezda Belgrad
- 2010/2011 Serbian Cup, with Crvena Zvezda Belgrad
- 2010/2011 Serbian Championship, with Crvena Zvezda Belgrad
- 2011/2012 French Championship, with Tours VB
- 2012/2013 Romanian Cup, with Tomis Constanța
- 2012/2013 Romanian Championship, with Tomis Constanța

=== National team ===
- 2009 FIVB World League
- 2010 FIVB World League
- 2010 FIVB World Championship
- 2011 CEV European Championship
