= Olimpia Sports Hall =

Indoor arena in Ploiești, Romania

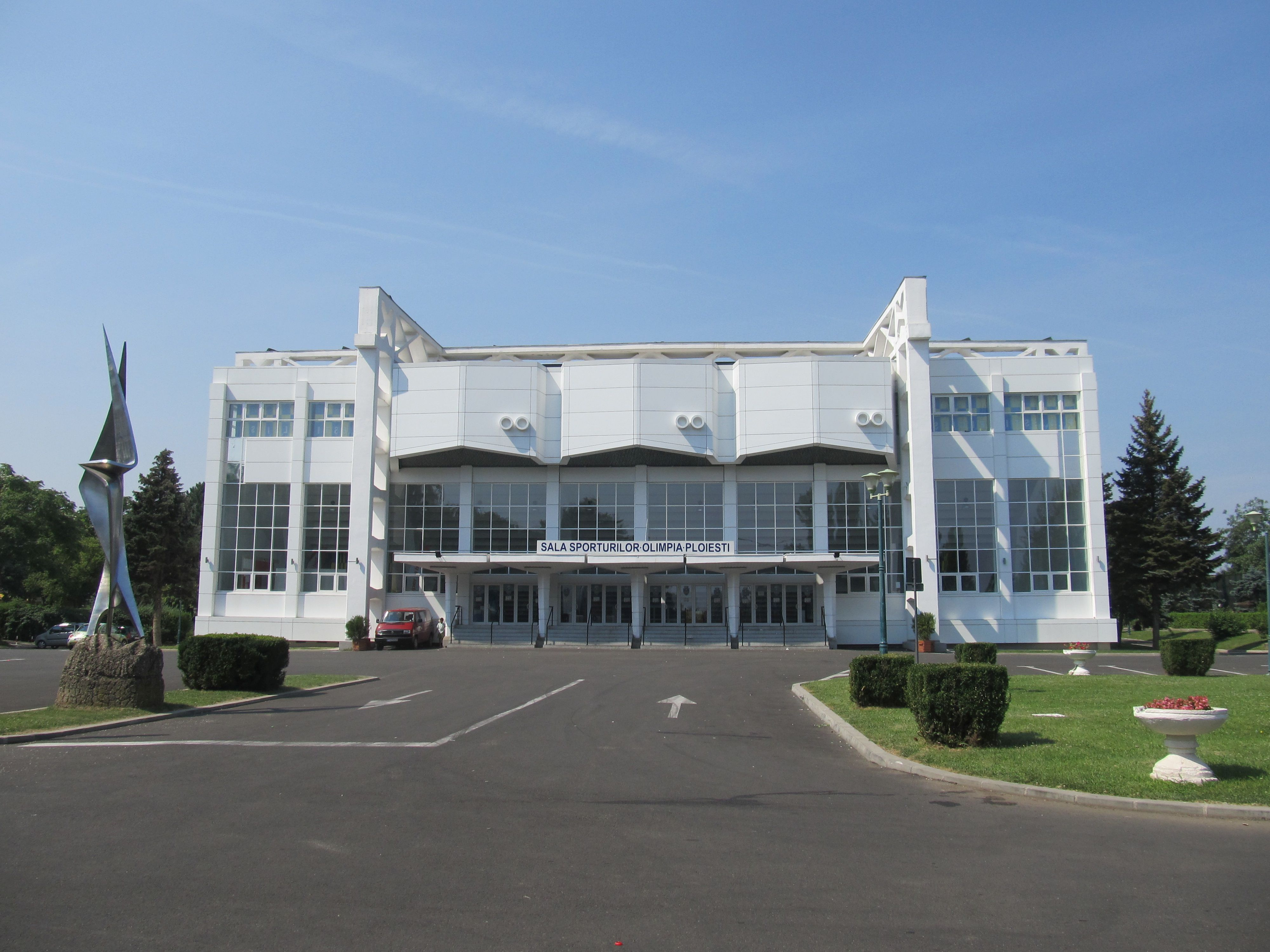
- Interactive map of Olimpia Sports Hall
- Former names: Victoria Sports Hall
- Location: Strada Mărășești, Ploiești, Romania
- Coordinates: 44.94°N 26.03°E
- Owner: Consiliul Local Ploiești
- Capacity: 3,500 (basketball, handball, volleyball)
- Surface: Parquet

Construction
- Groundbreaking: 1970
- Built: 1970–1972
- Opened: 1972
- Renovated: 2011–2013
- Architect: Valentin Dumitrescu
- Project manager: Gheorghe N. Dumitrescu

Tenants
- CSU Asesoft (2013–2015); CSM Ploiești (2013–2015); Tricolorul LMV Ploiești (2015–2018); CSM Petrolul Ploiești (present)

Olimpia Sports Hall (Romanian: 'Sala Sporturilor Olimpia') is an indoor arena in Ploiești, Romania. Its best known tenant was the men's basketball club CSU Asesoft, one of the top teams of the Romanian championship. It is currently where CSU Petrolul Ploiești play their home games.

== Use ==
=== Asesoft ===
Olimpia Sports Hall has hosted FIBA EuroCup Challenge final four of the 2004–05 season, where CSU Asesoft won the trophy for the first time in a final against PBC Lokomotiv Kuban after 75-74. Asesoft played in Olimpia 2013–14 and 2014–15 Eurocup season and hosted one of the biggest teams of Europa as BC Khimki, Hapoel Jerusalem B.C., BC Krasny Oktyabr, KK Partizan or BC Lietuvos rytas.
They have won 9 national championships in Olimpia between 2004-2010 and 2014-2015. In 2012 and 2013 the hall was renovated so it could not host 2 more national titles.

=== Tricolorul LMV ===
Tricolorul LMV played since 2015 Divizia A1 games in Olimpia becoming in 2017–18 for the very first time national champions and also cup winners. They will host 2018-2019 Champions League games in December 2018 for the first time in Ploiesti.

=== CSM Ploiesti ===
All sections from this club owned by the municipality of Ploiesti plays their home games here, including juniors games.

== Milestones ==
In honour of great performances, two banners with Antonio Alexe and Vladimir Arnautovic are hung at the north wall of the hall near ones with Asesoft's titles.
