= Group d'Arté Averbode =

Belgian volleyball club

- Ground: Gemeentelijke Sporthal; Averbode; Belgium
- Manager: (Belgium) Guy Van Meeuwen
- League: Liga Heren
- Website: Club home page

Volley Group d'Arté Averbode are a former Belgian volleyball club based in Averbode.

The A squad played in the Liga, the highest level of Belgian men's volleyball, before being declared bankrupt at the end of the 2010-11 season.

The team has played several times in the Challenge Cup, formerly known as CEV Cup.

== Names ==
- 1969-1999 – Everbeur Volley
- 1999-? – De Belleman Nissan Averbode
- ?-2004 – Pecotex De Belleman Averbode
- 2004-2005 – VC Averbode
- 2005-2006 – Axion Ski Team Averbode
- 2006-2007 – Slaapcomfort Beets-Patteet Averbode
- 2007-2009 – VC Handelsgids Averbode
- 2009-2010 – Group D'Arté Averbode
- 2010-2011 – Toyota Wouters Averbode

== Last squad ==
Coach: (Belgium) Dieter Melis

#	Nat.	Name
1	(Belgium)	Stephen Shittu
2	(Belgium)	Roel Nuijts
3	(Netherlands)	Joppe Paulides
4	(Netherlands)	Allan van de Loo
6	(Belgium)	Ruben Van Hirtum
7	(Belgium)	Wim Deville
8	(Belgium)	Wannes Cornelis
11	(Belgium)	Dieter Melis
12	(Czech Republic)	Ondrej Kust
13	(Belgium)	Wesley Torfs
18	(North Macedonia)	Dejan Simovski
