= Neven Majstorović =

Serbian volleyball player (born 1989)

Personal information
- Born: 17 March 1989 (age 37); Belgrade, SR Serbia, SFR Yugoslavia
- Height: 1.93 m (6 ft 4 in)

Volleyball information
- Position: Libero

Career
Years	Teams
2007–2011; 2011–2013; 2013–2015; 2015–2016; 2016–2017; 2017–2018; 2018–2020; 2020–2021; 2021–2022	Crvena Zvezda; Jedinstvo Stara Pazova; OK Partizan; Czarni Radom; Rennes Volley 35; CS Arcada Galați; SCMU Craiova; LUK Lublin; Radnički Kragujevac

National team
2014–	Serbia
Honours
Men's volleyball
Representing Serbia
FIVB World League
Gold medal – first place	2016 Kraków
Silver medal – second place	2015 Rio de Janeiro
CEV European Championship
Gold medal – first place	2019 Belgium/France/Netherlands/Slovenia
Bronze medal – third place	2017 Poland

Neven Majstorović (Serbian Cyrillic: Невен Мајсторовић; born 17 March 1989) is a Serbian former professional volleyball player. He was a member of the Serbia national team with which he won the 2019 European Champion title and the 2016 World League.

== Honours ==
=== Clubs ===
- Domestic
  - 2007–08 Serbian Championship, with OK Crvena Zvezda
  - 2008–09 Serbian Cup, with OK Crvena Zvezda
  - 2010–11 Serbian Cup, with OK Crvena Zvezda
  - 2017–18 Romanian SuperCup, with CS Arcada Galați
