= Paul Sanderson (volleyball) =

Australian volleyball player (born 1986)

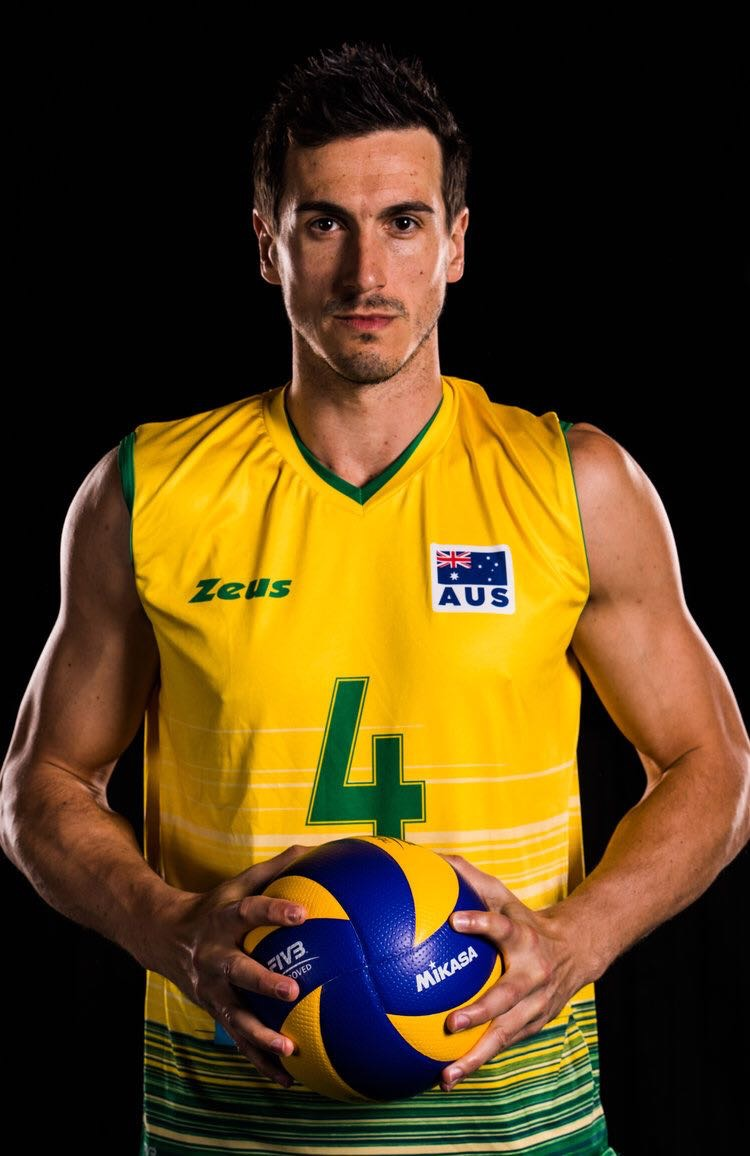
- Sanderson in 2014

Personal information
- Full name: Paul Sanderson
- Nickname: Sando
- Nationality: Australian
- Born: 7 January 1986 (age 40)
- Hometown: Melbourne
- Height: 195 cm (6 ft 5 in)
- Weight: 94 kg (207 lb)
- Spike: 348 cm (137 in)
- Block: 335 cm (132 in)

Volleyball information
- Number: 4 (national team)

Career
Years	Teams
2018	CS Arcada Galați

National team
2014-	Australia

Paul Sanderson (born 7 January 1986) is an Australian male volleyball player. He is part of the Australia men's national volleyball team. On club level he plays for CS Arcada Galați in Romania.

== Career ==
Paul started playing volleyball at Billanook College in Victoria Australia at the age of 13. Participating in State and National schools cup, Paul was selected to represent his State at the National Championships every year from u/15 to u/21. He then received a full ride scholarship to Newman University in Wichita Kansas, where he was selected as rookie of the year, first team all American and national championship all star whilst leading the country in kills and aces.

He continued his dominance transferring to Brandon University in Canada. Four years straight Paul led points, aces and kills, racking up several first team all Canadian awards and was selected as MVP of the league in 2010. Paul still holds many all time records in the Canada West Division of the CIS.

Professionally, Paul started his career in Switzerland, playing for Schonenwerd Volley who has become a powerhouse in the Swiss league. For the past two seasons Paul Played in Saimaa Volley in Finland. In 2012/13 Paul was the leading scoring left side and ace leader of the Finland Mestaruusliiga.

He has joined full time the Volleyroo's since 2014. After Finland, he has moved to Indonesia, Puerto Rico, Belgium and more recently back to Indonesia, where he is currently playing with PERTAMINA Energy Jakarta.
