= Nemanja Stefanović =

Serbian volleyball player (born 2001)

Personal information
- Nationality: (Serbia) Serbian
- Born: 12 February 2001 (age 25); Novi Sad, Serbia
- Hometown: Novi Sad
- Height: 200 cm (6 ft 7 in)
- Weight: 92 kg (203 lb)
- Spike: 336 cm (132 in)
- Block: 312 cm (123 in)

Volleyball information
- Position: Setter

Career
Years	Teams
2006-2011; 2011–2012; 2012–2013; 2013–2014; 2014–2015; 2015–2016; 2016–2017	OK Crvena Zvezda; OK Vojvodina; AZS Politechnika Warszawska; OK Spartak Subotica; OK Crvena Zvezda; Maccabi Hod Hasharon; Spartak Komarno

National team
2012	Serbia

Nemanja Stefanović (Serbian: Немања Стефановић, [ně̞maɲa stefǎːnoʋitɕ]) (born 12 February 2001 in Novi Sad) is a Serbian volleyball player. He is 200 cm tall, and he plays as a setter.

== Career ==
=== His brother ===
Stefanovic has one younger brother Dusan Stefanovic born in 2003. His brother is studying in Economic school in Novi Sad, Serbia after he graduated in Gymnasium Jovan Jovanovic Zmaj.

=== Club career ===
Stefanović started his professional career in Crvena Zvezda Belgrade, where he was playing for six seasons before he joined Vojvodina . He played one season for Vojvodina. At the end of the 2011/2012 season, he signed for Polish team AZS Politechnika Warszawska.

=== National team career ===
Stefanović was member of Serbia junior national team, and he also played for University National Team of Serbia at Summer University Games in 2007 and 2009. He also made several caps for senior national team as well during the year 2012.
