= VM Zalău =

Romanian volleyball club

- Full name: Volei Municipal Zalău
- Founded: 1983; 42 years ago as Remat Zalău; 2015; 10 years ago as VM Zalău
- Ground: Sala Sporturilor (Capacity: 1,200)
- Manager: Nikolay Jeliazkov
- League: Divizia A1
- 2018–19: Divizia A1, 2nd
- Website: Club home page

Volei Municipal Zalău, commonly known as VM Zalău, is a professional volleyball club based in Zalău, Romania.

== Honours ==
- Divizia A1:
  - Winners: 1997, 1998, 1999, 2000, 2010, 2011, 2012, 2017
  - Runners-up: 2019
- Cupa României:
  - Winners: 2012, 2015, 2016

== Previous names ==
- –2003: Elcond Zalău
- 2003–2017: Club Sportiv Remat Zalău
- 2017–Present: Volei Municipal Zalău

== Team ==
=== Current squad ===
Squad for the 2018-19 season

- (Romania) Cristian Bartha
- (Romania) Filip Constantin
- (Romania) Andrei Spînu
- (Romania) Ciprian Matei
- (Romania) Răzvan Mihalcea
- (Romania) Mihai Gheorghiţă
- (Romania) Paul Şomoi
- (Romania) Rareş Bălean
- (Bulgaria) Miroslav Gradinarov
- (Italy) Jani Jeliazkov
- (Austria) Philipp Kroiss
- (Brazil) Leonardo João Dal Bosco Dall Agnol

== See also ==
- Romania men's national volleyball team
