= Antti Ronkainen =

Antti Ronkainen might refer to:

- Antti Ronkainen (footballer) (born 1958), Finnish international footballer and manager
- Antti Ronkainen (political scientist) (born 1985), Finnish political scientist
- Antti Ronkainen (volleyball player) (born 1996), Finnish international volleyball player
