= Miroslav Gradinarov =

Bulgarian volleyball player (born 1985)

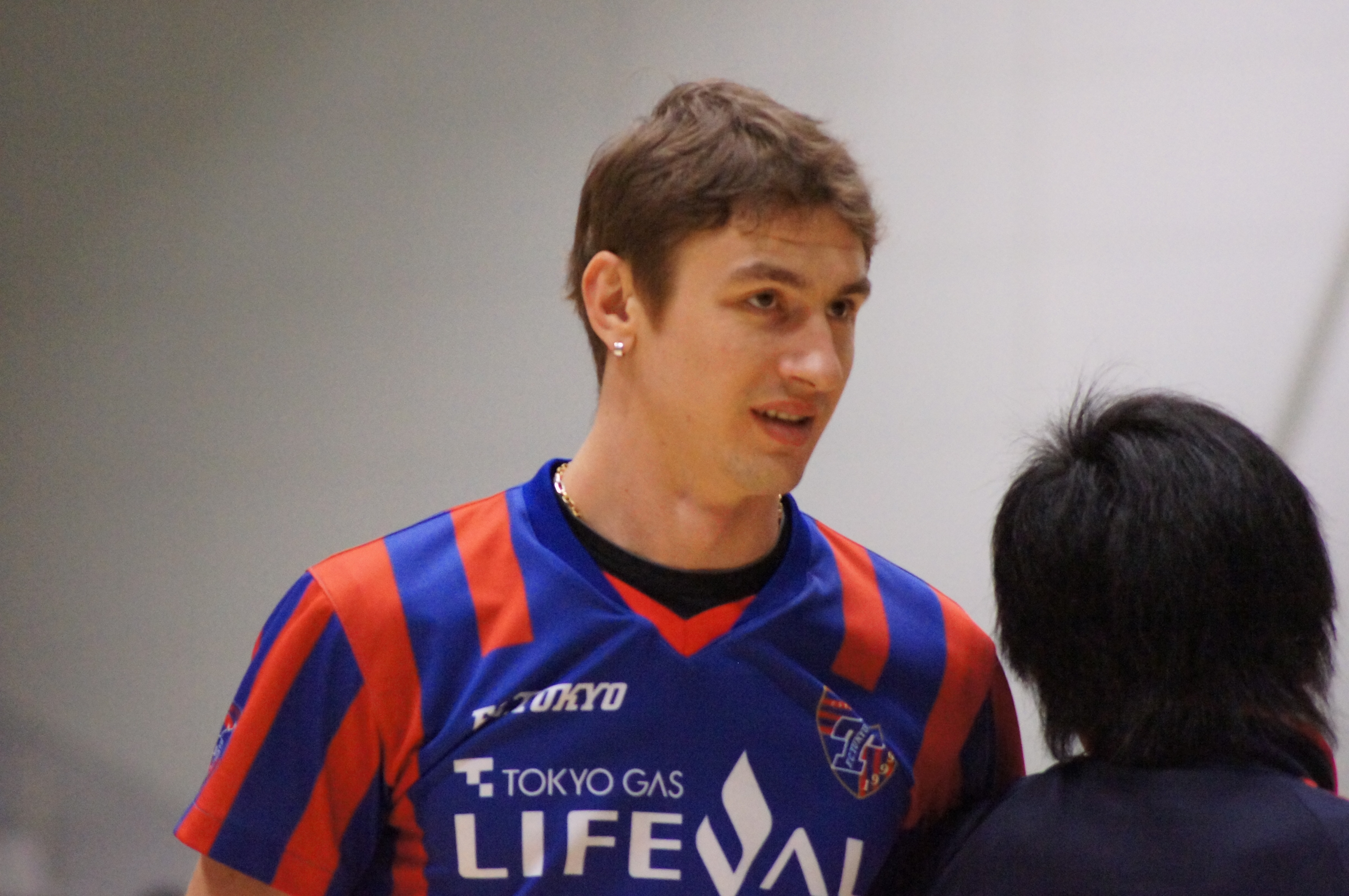
- Gradinarov with F.C. Tokyo in 2012

Personal information
- Nationality: Bulgarian
- Born: 10 February 1985 (age 41); Varna, Bulgaria
- Height: 2.03 m (6 ft 8 in)
- Weight: 91 kg (201 lb)
- Spike: 350 cm (138 in)
- Block: 330 cm (130 in)

Volleyball information
- Position: Outside hitter
- Current club: VM Zalău
- Number: 7 (national team)

Career
Years	Teams
2001–2008; 2008–2009; 2009–2010; 2010–2011; 2011–2014; 2014–2015; 2015–2017; 2017–2018; 2018–	Cherno More Volley; Tokat Belediye Plevnespor; Pineto Volley; Omonia Nicosia Volley; F.C. Tokyo; Spacer's Toulouse; F.C. Tokyo; Benfica; VM Zalău

National team
2014–	Bulgaria

Miroslav Gradinarov (Bulgarian: Мирослав Градинаров) (born 10 February 1985) is a Bulgarian male volleyballer who plays for VM Zalău in Romania and the Bulgaria national team. He represented his country at 2014 FIVB Volleyball Men's World Championship in Poland.
