= Tricolorul LMV Ploiești =

Romanian volleyball club

- Short name: LMV; Tricolorul
- Founded: 2007
- Dissolved: 2018
- Ground: Sala Olimpia (Capacity: 3,000)
- League: Divizia A1
- 2018–19: Divizia A1, 12th (relegated)

Tricolorul LMV Ploiești was a professional men's volleyball club based in Ploiești, Romania, that competed in the CEV Challenge Cup.

Tricolorul LMV Ploiești suddenly disbanded in the year when the club achieved its highest performance, winning the Romanian title.

== Honours ==
=== Domestic ===
- Divizia A1

Winners (1): 2018

- Cupa României

Winners (1): 2018

== See also ==
- Romania men's national volleyball team
