= Spacer's Toulouse Volley =

French volleyball club

- Full name: Spacer's Toulouse Volley
- Nickname: Les Spacer's
- Founded: 1994
- Ground: Palais des sports André-Brouat; 3 rue Pierre Laplace, Toulouse (Capacity: 4,397)
- Chairman: Yann Kerihuel
- Manager: Patrick Duflos
- League: LNV Ligue A
- 2024–25: 7th
- Website: Club home page

Uniforms
Home	Away

Spacer's Toulouse Volley is a French professional volleyball club based in Toulouse, France. It was formed from the merger of the volleyball sections of the Toulouse Université Club (TUC) and the Toulouse Olympique Aérospatiale Club (TOAC). The club currently competes in the top flight of French volleyball, the LNV Ligue A.

== History ==
In 1992, the TOAC (Toulouse Olympique Aérospatiale Club) reached the French second division (Pro B). Two years later, in 1994, the TOAC team, still playing in Pro B, and the TUC team, in fourth division (Nationale 2), merged to create TOAC-TUC VB, a single entity aimed at strengthening the competitiveness of volleyball in Toulouse.

In 1996, the president of the basketball club Spacer’s Toulouse proposed to group together the basketball, handball, rugby league, and volleyball clubs under a single banner to form an omnisports club, in order to better promote these so-called minor sports compared to rugby union and football in Toulouse. The first team of TOAC-TUC VB then adopted the name Spacer's Toulouse Volley-ball.

In 1999, the basketball club from Toulouse, the driving force behind this project, was relegated to a lower division, and its president decided to step down. As a result, the Spacer’s Toulouse entity was abandoned by all the clubs—except for the volleyball team, which continued to use the name for its professional team’s communications.

In 2005, the Toulousains were crowned champions of PRO B France. They were then promoted to the PRO A championship.

During the 2006/2007 season, the club lost in the semi-finals of both the French Championship and the French Cup. Spacer's Toulouse Volley-Ball finished fourth in the championship, the club’s best ranking to date. They thus qualified for the European Cup.

In January 2008, the Toulouse club reached the quarter-finals of the European Cup (CEV Cup) for the first time, losing to M. Roma Volley (the future winner of the tournament).

On January 28, 2011, the club broke the attendance record for a French Ligue A Men’s Championship match: 4,223 spectators at the Palais des Sports André Brouat in Toulouse. This record was set during the Toulouse-Cannes match of the sixteenth matchday of the championship.

During the 2012/2013 season, the club qualified for its first final of the French Cup, losing to Tours.

After another fourth place in the championship during the 2013/2014 season, the club qualified for the CEV Cup for the 2014/2015 season. They were then eliminated by Dynamo Moscow in the quarter-finals, the eventual winner of the tournament.

This fourth place finish in the Ligue A regular season was achieved again during the 2015/2016 season.

In 2017-2018, for the first time the club is qualified for the CEV Champions League. They won against Novi Sad during the qualification round, and were set in the Pool D with VC Zenit-Kazan, Jastrzębski Węgiel and Berlin Recycling Volleys. They only scored one point in 6 matchs (thanks to a 2-3 home defeat against Jastrzębski). The Spacer's have many difficulties during this 2017-2018 season, ending at the twelfth and last place of the league, and only saved from relegation to the second division due to the league expanding to fourteen clubs.

== Honours ==
=== Domestic ===
- French Championship

Runners up (1): 2016-2017

- Pro B

Winners (1): 2004-2005

- French Cup

Runners up (1): 2012-2013

=== International ===
- CEV Cup

Quarter-finals (2): 2007-2008, 2014-2015

- CEV Champions League

League round (1): 2017-2018
