= Henrik Porkka =

Finnish volleyball player (born 1998)

Personal information
- Nationality: Finnish
- Born: 14 January 1998 (age 28)
- Height: 2.02 m (6 ft 8 in)
- Weight: 82 kg (181 lb)
- Spike: 360 cm (142 in)
- Block: 330 cm (130 in)

Volleyball information
- Position: Middle blocker
- Current club: LEKA Volley
- Number: 13

National team
Finland

Henrik Porkka (born 14 January 1998) is a Finnish volleyball player for LEKA Volley and the Finnish national team.

He participated at the 2017 Men's European Volleyball Championship.
