= CS Dinamo București (men's volleyball) =

Romanian volleyball club

Dinamo București
- Full name: CS Dinamo București
- Short name: Dinamo
- Founded: 1948; 78 years ago
- Ground: Dinamo Polyvalent Hall (Capacity: 2,538)
- Manager: Bogdan Tănase
- League: Divizia A1
- 2025–26: Divizia A1, 1st
- Website: Club home page

Uniforms
Home	Away

CS Dinamo București is a professional volleyball club based in Bucharest, Romania, that competes in the Divizia A1, the top tier of Romanian volleyball.

== Team honours ==
=== Domestic competitions ===
- Divizia A1 (20)
  1953, 1958, 1972, 1973, 1974, 1975, 1976, 1977, 1979, 1980, 1981, 1982, 1983, 1984, 1985, 1992, 1994, 1995, 2025, 2026
  1988, 1989, 2007, 2009, 2022
  2006, 2008, 2010, 2011, 2012, 2014
- Romanian Cup (14)
  2010, 2011, 2019, 2021
  2012, 2014
- Romanian Super Cup (3)
  2021, 2022, 2026
  2019

=== European competitions ===
- CEV Champions League (3)
  1966, 1967, 1981
  1968, 1974, 1977
- CEV Cup Winner's Cup (1)
  1979

== See also ==
- CS Dinamo București (women's volleyball)
