= Daan van Haarlem =

Dutch volleyball player (born 1989)

Personal information
- Nationality: Dutch
- Born: 15 March 1989 (age 37); Doetinchem, Netherlands
- Height: 1.98 m (6 ft 6 in)
- Weight: 90 kg (198 lb)
- Spike: 343 cm (135 in)
- Block: 337 cm (133 in)

Volleyball information
- Position: Setter
- Number: 12

Career
Years	Teams
2007–2010; 2010-2011; 2012–2013; 2013-2015; 2015-2017; 2017; 2018; 2018–2019; 2020 -	HVA Amsterdam Netherlands; ABC Titans Germany/Webton Twente The Netherlands; Langhenkel Volley Netherlands; FirmX Orion Doetinchem The Netherlands; Prefaxis Menen Belgium; Kladno Volejbal Czech Republic; Berlin Recycling Volleys Germany/ Levski Sofia Bulgaria; Levski Sofia Bulgaria; VK ČEZ Karlovarsko Karlovy Vary Czech Republic

National team
2013–2019, 101 matches	Netherlands

Daan van Haarlem (born 15 March 1989) is a Dutch male volleyball player. He is part of the Netherlands men's national volleyball team. On club level he plays for VK ČEZ Karlovarsko and Karlovy Vary (Czech Republic).
