= Dunărea Sports Hall (Galați) =

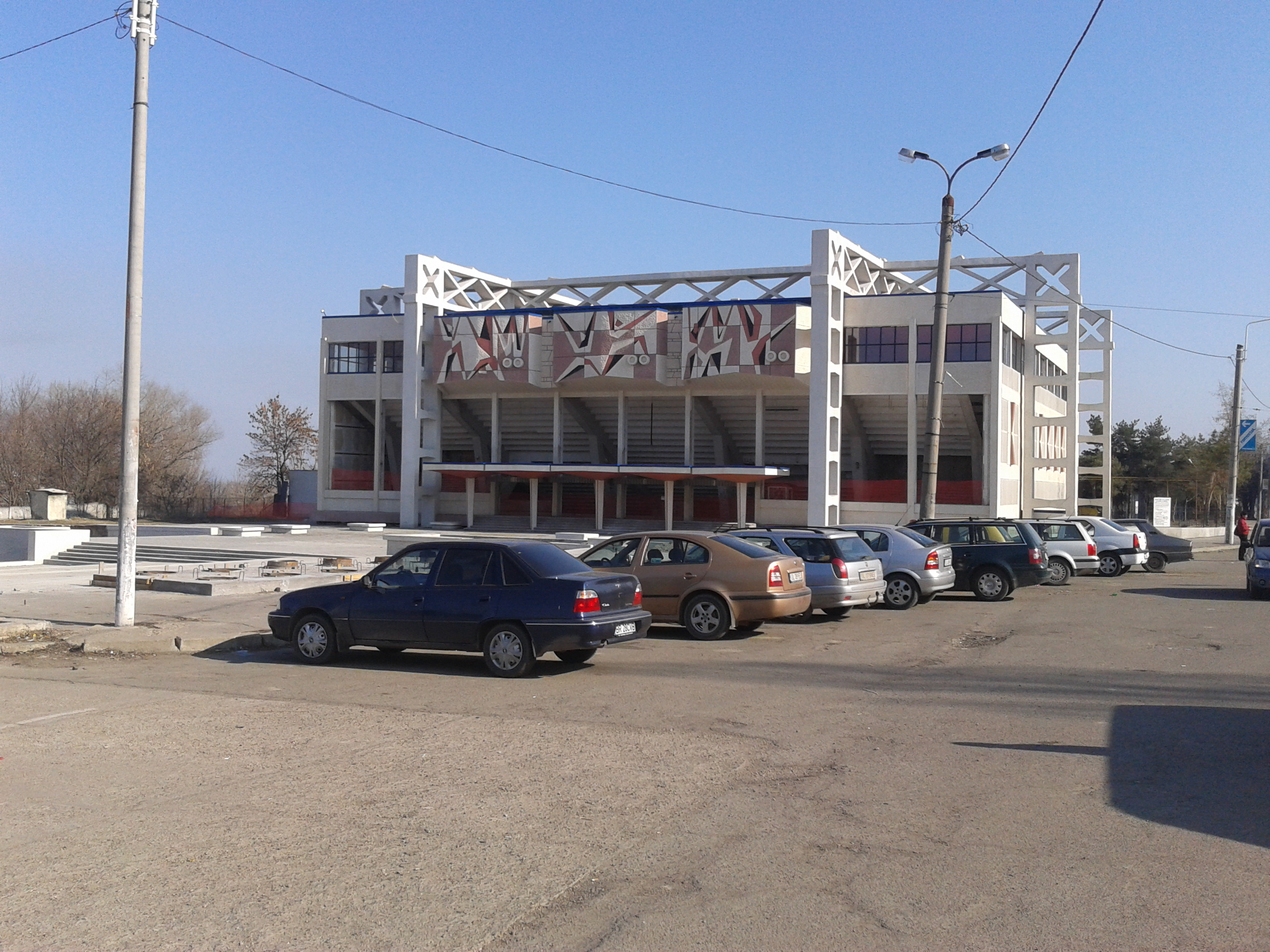
- Full name: Sala Sporturilor Dunărea
- Location: Galați, Romania
- Owner: DJST Galați
- Operator: Arcada Galați; Danubius Galați; Phoenix Galați
- Capacity: 1,500

Construction
- Opened: 1973
- Renovated: 2011–2013

Tenants
- CSU Danubius Galați; Phoenix Galați; Arcada Galați

Dunărea Sports Hall is an indoor arena in Galați, Romania and is the home ground of basketball, handball and volleyball clubs from Galați. The arena holds 1,500 fans.
