= Sala Mihai Viteazu =

Coordinates: 44°25′47″N 26°03′18″E

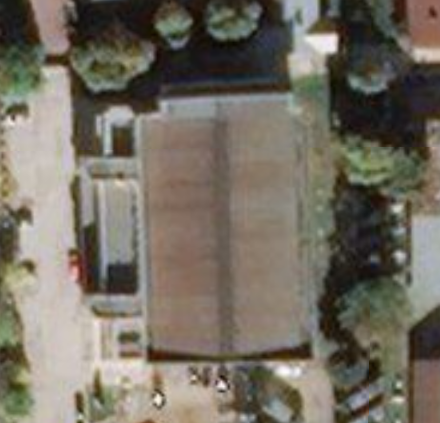
- Interactive map of Sala Mihai Viteazu
- Location: Bucharest, Romania
- Owner: CSA Steaua București
- Capacity: 500
- Surface: Parquetry

Tenants
- Steaua CSM EximBank București; Steaua București (handball)

Website
- http://www.csasteaua.ro/

Sala Mihai Viteazu is an indoor arena in Bucharest, Romania. Its best known tenant is the men's basketball club Steaua CSM EximBank București.
