= Ruben Van Hirtum =

Belgian volleyball player (born 1990)

Personal information
- Nationality: Belgian
- Born: 10 April 1990 (age 36)
- Height: 1.94 m (6 ft 4 in)
- Weight: 86 kg (190 lb)
- Spike: 343 cm (135 in)
- Block: 320 cm (126 in)

Volleyball information
- Position: Outside spiker
- Current club: Knack Randstad Roeselare
- Number: 12

National team
Belgium

Ruben Van Hirtum (born 10 April 1990) is a Belgian volleyball player for Knack Randstad Roeselare and the Belgian national team.

He participated at the 2017 Men's European Volleyball Championship.
