= CS Arcada Galați =

Romanian volleyball club

- Ground: Sala Sporturilor Dunărea (Capacity: 1,500)
- Chairman: Mirel Zaharescu
- Manager: Sergiu Stancu
- League: Divizia A1
- 2022–23: Divizia A1, 1st
- Website: Club home page

CS Arcada Galați is a professional volleyball club based in Galați, Romania, that competes in the Divizia A1, the top tier of Romanian volleyball.

== Honours ==
=== Domestic ===
- Divizia A1

Winners (5): 2019, 2020, 2021, 2022, 2023
Runners-up (3): 2018, 2024, 2026
Third place (2): 2016, 2017

- Cupa României

Winners (2): 2017, 2022
Runners-up (3): 2018, 2019, 2023

- Supercupa României

Winners (2): 2017, 2019

== Team ==
=== Current squad ===
Squad for the 2018-19 season

- (Romania) Vlad Cuciureanu
- (Romania) Adrian Fehér
- (Romania) Liviu Cristudor
- (Serbia) Miloš Terzić
- (Serbia) Nemanja Čubrilo
- (Croatia) Ivan Raič
- (Brazil) Tiago Gatiboni Wesz
- (Australia) Paul Sanderson
- (Puerto Rico) Ángel Pérez
- (Venezuela) José Manuel Carrasco Angulo
- (Saint Lucia) Julian Bissette
- (Russia) Alexander Kullo

== See also ==
- Romania men's national volleyball team
