= Divizia A1 (men's volleyball) =

Romanian sports league

- Current season, competition or edition: 2025–26 Divizia A1 (men's volleyball)
- Sport: Volleyball
- Founded: 1931
- CEO: Gheorghe Vișan
- No. of teams: 12
- Country: Romania
- Continent: CEV
- Most recent champions: Dinamo București (20th title / 2025–26)
- Most titles: Dinamo București (20 titles)
- Broadcaster: TVR Sport
- Related competitions: Romanian Volleyball Cup
- Website: frvolei.ro

The Divizia A1 is the men's top Romanian professional volleyball league. With 20 titles, Dinamo Bucharest —the reigning champion— is the most decorated club in Romanian men's volleyball.

== History ==
The first men's national volleyball championship took place in 1949. A total of 20 teams participated: 14 teams from the provinces and 6 from Bucharest.

== Format ==
Divizia A1: a single division, with twelve participating teams.

Divizia A2: two divisions (East and West), each consisting of five teams.

== Romanian clubs in European competitions in the 2025-26 season ==
Competition	Club	Progress
Liga Campionilor CEV	CS Dinamo București	Round 1
Cupa CEV	Corona Brașov	Round 2
Cupa CEV	SCM Craiova	Round 1
Cupa Challenge CEV	CS Remat Zalău	Round 2
Cupa Challenge CEV	Arcada Galați	Round 1

== Participants (2026-2027) ==
Club	City	Titles	Arena	Capacity
Știința Baia Mare	Baia Mare	1	Lascăr Pană Sports Hall	800
Corona Brașov	Brașov	1	Sala Dumitru Popescu	1570
CSM Bucharest	Bucharest	0	Sala Unirea	300
Dinamo Bucharest	Bucharest	20	Sala Dinamo	2538
Rapid Bucharest	Bucharest	11	Sala Rapid	1500
Steaua Bucharest	Bucharest	16	Sala Polivalentă	5300
Știința Bucharest	Bucharest	0	Sala Politehnică	2538
Universitatea Cluj	Cluj-Napoca	0	Sala Horia Demian	2800
Universitatea Craiova	Craiova	1	Sala Polivalentă	4215
Unirea Dej	Dej	0	Sala Sporturilor	1000
Arcada Galati	Galati	5	Dunărea Sports Hall	1600
CVM Zalău	Zalău	0	Sala Gheorghe Tadici	1000

== Past winners ==
- 1931: Apărătorii Patriei București (1)
- 1932: Apărătorii Patriei București (2)
- 1933: not held
- 1934: Sportul Studențesc București (1)
- 1935: Sportul Studențesc București (2)
- 1936: Sportul Studențesc București (3)
- 1937: Sportul Studențesc București (4)
- 1938: PTT București (1)
- 1939: CFR București (1)
- 1940: CS Bonaparte București (1)
- 1941: not held
- 1942: Avântul București (1)
- 1943: VSC București (1)
- 1944: not held
- 1945: Medicina București (1)
- 1946: not held
- 1947: Medicina București (2)
- 1948: not held
- 1949: Locomotiva CFR București (2)
- 1950: Locomotiva CFR București (3)
- 1951: CCA București (1)
- 1952: CCA București (2)
- 1953: Dinamo București (1)
- 1954: CCA București (3)
- 1955: Locomotiva ICF București (4)
- 1956: Locomotiva București (5)
- 1957: CCA București (4)
- 1958: Dinamo București (2)
- 1959: Rapid București (6)
- 1960: Rapid București (7)
- 1961: Rapid București (8)
- 1962: Rapid București (9)
- 1963: Rapid București (10)
- 1964: not held
- 1965: Rapid București (11)
- 1966: Rapid București (12)
- 1967: Steaua București (5)
- 1968: Steaua București (6)
- 1969: Steaua București (7)
- 1970: Steaua București (8)
- 1971: Steaua București (9)
- 1972: Dinamo București (3)
- 1973: Dinamo București (4)
- 1974: Dinamo București (5)
- 1975: Dinamo București (6)
- 1976: Dinamo București (7)
- 1977: Dinamo București (8)
- 1978: Steaua București (10)
- 1979: Dinamo București (9)
- 1980: Dinamo București (10)
- 1981: Dinamo București (11)
- 1982: Dinamo București (12)
- 1983: Dinamo București (13)
- 1984: Dinamo București (14)
- 1985: Dinamo București (15)
- 1986: Steaua București (11)
- 1987: Steaua București (12)
- 1988: Steaua București (13)
- 1989: Steaua București (14)
- 1990: Steaua București (15)
- 1991: Steaua București (16)
- 1992: Dinamo București (16)
- 1993: Universitatea "Explorări" Baia Mare (1)
- 1994: Dinamo București (17)
- 1995: Dinamo București (18)
- 1996: Universitatea "Ardaf" Cluj Napoca (1)
- 1997: "Elcond" Zalău (1)
- 1998: "Elcond" Zalău (2)
- 1999: "Elcond" Zalău (3)
- 2000: Petrolul "Petrom" Ploiești (1)
- 2001: Petrolul "Petrom" Ploiești (2)
- 2002: Petrolul "Petrom" Ploiești (3)
- 2003: "Deltacons" Tulcea (1)
- 2004: "Deltacons" Tulcea (2)
- 2005: "Deltacons" Tulcea (3)
- 2006: Petrolul "Petrom" Ploiești (4)
- 2007: Tomis Constanța (1)
- 2008: Tomis Constanța (2)
- 2009: Tomis Constanța (3)
- 2010: Remat Zalău (4)
- 2011: Remat Zalău (5)
- 2012: Remat Zalău (6)
- 2013: Tomis Constanța (4)
- 2014: Tomis Constanța (5)
- 2015: Tomis Constanța (6)
- 2016: SCM U Craiova (1)
- 2017: VM Zalău (7)
- 2018: Tricolorul LMV Ploiești (1)
- 2019: Arcada Galați (1)
- 2020: Arcada Galați (2)
- 2021: Arcada Galați (3)
- 2022: Arcada Galați (4)
- 2023: Arcada Galați (5)
- 2024: Corona Brașov (1)
- 2025: Dinamo București (19)
- 2026: Dinamo București (20)

== Titles by club ==
Club	Titles	Years	Other names
Dinamo București	20	1953, 1958, 1972, 1973, 1974, 1975, 1976, 1977, 1979, 1980, 1981, 1982, 1983, 1984, 1985, 1992, 1994, 1995, 2025, 2026	
Steaua București	16	1951, 1952, 1954, 1957, 1967, 1968, 1969, 1970, 1971, 1978, 1986, 1987, 1988, 1989, 1990, 1991	CCA
Rapid București	12	1939, 1949, 1950, 1955, 1956, 1959, 1960, 1961, 1962, 1963, 1965, 1966	CFR București, Locomotiva CFR București, Locomotiva ICF București, Locomotiva București
SCM Zalău	7	1997, 1998, 1999, 2010, 2011, 2012, 2017	"Elcond" Zalău, Remat Zalău,
CVM Tomis Constanța	6	2007, 2008, 2009, 2013, 2014, 2015	
Arcada Galați	5	2019, 2020, 2021, 2022, 2023	
Sportul Studențesc București	4	1934, 1935, 1936, 1937,	
Petrolul "Petrom" Ploiești	4	2000, 2001, 2002, 2006	
"Deltacons" Tulcea	3	2003, 2004, 2005	
Apărătorii Patriei București	2	1931, 1932	
Medicina București	2	1945, 1947	
PTT București	1	1938	
CS Bonaparte București	1	1940	
Avântul București	1	1942	
VSC București	1	1943	
Universitatea "Explorări" Baia Mare	1	1993	
Universitatea "Ardaf" Cluj	1	1996	
SCM U Craiova	1	2016	
Tricolorul LMV Ploiești	1	2018	
Corona Brașov	1	2024	

== See also ==
- Romanian Women's Volleyball League
