= SCM U Craiova (men's volleyball) =

Romanian volleyball club

- Ground: Sala Polivalentă (Capacity: 4,215)
- Manager: Dan Pascu
- League: Divizia A1
- 2021–22: Divizia A1, 3rd

SCM U Craiova is a volleyball club based in Craiova, Romania.

== Honours ==
- Divizia A1:
  - Winners (1): 2016
  - Second Place (4): 2013, 2017, 2020, 2021
  - Third Place (3): 2015, 2019, 2022
- Romanian Cup:
  - Winners (1): 2023
  - Runners-up (2): 2021

== See also ==
- Romania men's national volleyball team
