= 2018–19 CEV Champions League qualification =

This article shows the qualification phase for 2018–19 CEV Champions League. A total of 16 teams entered this qualification round. During qualification, the winners of each tie keep on progressing until the last 2 teams standing join the 18 teams which have directly qualified to the main tournament League round based on the European Cups' Ranking List. All 14 teams which do not progress in qualification are allocated to the 2018–19 Men's CEV Cup.

== Participating teams ==
Drawing of lots took place on 29 June 2018 in Luxembourg City, Luxembourg.

Rank	Country	No. teams	Team(s)	Outcome (qualified to)
4	Turkey	1	İstanbul BBSK	CEV Cup
5	Germany	1	United Volleys Frankfurt	Champions League
6	Belgium	1	Lindemans Aalst	CEV Cup
7	France	1	Chaumont VB 52 Haute Marne	Champions League
9	Greece	1	PAOK Thessaloniki	CEV Cup
11	Austria	1	SK Posojilnica Aich/Dob	CEV Cup
12	Serbia	1	Vojvodina Novi Sad	CEV Cup
13	Bulgaria	1	Neftohimic 2010 Burgas	CEV Cup
14	Finland	1	Ford Store Levoranta Sastamala	CEV Cup
17	Netherlands	1	Abiant Lycurgus	CEV Cup
18	Belarus	1	Shakhtyor Soligorsk	CEV Cup
25	Bosnia and Herzegovina	1	Mladost Brčko	CEV Cup
25	Croatia	1	Mladost Zagreb	CEV Cup
32	Spain	1	CAI Teruel	CEV Cup
37	Hungary	1	Vegyész RC Kazincbarcika	CEV Cup
49	Norway	1	Viking TIF Bergen	CEV Cup

== First round ==
- 16 teams compete in the first round.
- Winner advance to the second round and loser qualify to CEV Cup.
- All times are local.

Team 1	Agg.	Team 2	1st leg	2nd leg	Golden Set
CAI Teruel (Spain)	3–3	(Belgium) Lindemans Aalst	3–0	0–3	15–7
Viking TIF Bergen (Norway)	0–6	(France) Chaumont VB 52 Haute Marne	0–3	0–3	
Mladost Brčko (Bosnia and Herzegovina)	0–6	(Bulgaria) Neftohimic 2010 Burgas	1–3	1–3	
Mladost Zagreb (Croatia)	1–5	(Serbia) Vojvodina Novi Sad	2–3	1–3	
Vegyész RC Kazincbarcika (Hungary)	1–5	(Greece) PAOK Thessaloniki	2–3	0–3	
Ford Store Levoranta Sastamala (Finland)	1–5	(Turkey) İstanbul BBSK	2–3	1–3	
Shakhtyor Soligorsk (Belarus)	2–4	(Germany) United Volleys Frankfurt	0–3	3–2	
Abiant Lycurgus (Netherlands)	2–4	(Austria) SK Posojilnica Aich/Dob	1–3	3–2	

=== First leg ===
Date	Time		Score		Set 1	Set 2	Set 3	Set 4	Set 5	Total	Report
8 Oct	19:00	Vegyész RC Kazincbarcika (Hungary)	2–3	(Greece) PAOK Thessaloniki	18–25	27–25	30–28	19–25	13–15	107–118	Report
9 Oct	19:00	Viking TIF Bergen (Norway)	0–3	(France) Chaumont VB 52 Haute Marne	22–25	12–25	21–25			55–75	Report
9 Oct	20:15	CAI Teruel (Spain)	3–0	(Belgium) Lindemans Aalst	25–20	25–22	25–17			75–59	Report
9 Oct	20:30	Mladost Zagreb (Croatia)	2–3	(Serbia) Vojvodina Novi Sad	21–25	21–25	27–25	25–20	12–15	106–110	Report
10 Oct	18:00	Shakhtyor Soligorsk (Belarus)	0–3	(Germany) United Volleys Frankfurt	21–25	22–25	20–25			63–75	Report
10 Oct	18:30	Ford Store Levoranta Sastamala (Finland)	2–3	(Turkey) İstanbul BBSK	25–22	19–25	25–16	21–25	15–17	105–105	Report
10 Oct	19:00	Mladost Brčko (Bosnia and Herzegovina)	1–3	(Bulgaria) Neftohimic 2010 Burgas	17–25	20–25	26–24	23–25		86–99	Report
11 Oct	19:00	Abiant Lycurgus (Netherlands)	1–3	(Austria) SK Posojilnica Aich/Dob	24–26	22–25	25–23	18–25		89–99	Report

=== Second leg ===
Date	Time		Score		Set 1	Set 2	Set 3	Set 4	Set 5	Total	Report
16 Oct	19:00	Neftohimic 2010 Burgas (Bulgaria)	3–1	(Bosnia and Herzegovina) Mladost Brčko	25–21	25–19	19–25	25–16		94–81	Report
17 Oct	17:00	İstanbul BBSK (Turkey)	3–1	(Finland) Ford Store Levoranta Sastamala	25–23	25–19	23–25	25–16		98–83	Report
17 Oct	19:00	PAOK Thessaloniki (Greece)	3–0	(Hungary) Vegyész RC Kazincbarcika	25–16	25–12	25–19			75–47	Report
17 Oct	19:00	United Volleys Frankfurt (Germany)	2–3	(Belarus) Shakhtyor Soligorsk	25–21	25–21	19–25	18–25	19–21	106–113	Report
17 Oct	20:00	Chaumont VB 52 Haute Marne] (France)	3–0	(Norway) Viking TIF Bergen	25–15	25–20	25–8			75–43	Report
17 Oct	20:25	SK Posojilnica Aich/Dob (Austria)	2–3	(Netherlands) Abiant Lycurgus	20–25	26–24	25–19	19–25	15–17	105–110	Report
17 Oct	20:30	Vojvodina Novi Sad (Serbia)	3–1	(Croatia) Mladost Zagreb	25–23	21–25	25–21	28–26		99–95	Report
17 Oct	20:30	Lindemans Aalst (Belgium)	3–0	(Spain) CAI Teruel	34–32	25–21	25–21			84–74	Report
Golden set		Lindemans Aalst (Belgium)	7–15	(Spain) CAI Teruel							

== Second round ==
- 8 teams compete in the second round.
- Winners advance to the third round and losers qualify to CEV Cup.

Team 1	Agg.	Team 2	1st leg	2nd leg	Golden set
Neftohimic 2010 Burgas (Bulgaria)	1–5	(Serbia) Vojvodina Novi Sad	2–3	0–3	
CAI Teruel (Spain)	2–4	(France) Chaumont VB 52 Haute Marne	3–2	0–3	
United Volleys Frankfurt (Germany)	4–2	(Austria) SK Posojilnica Aich/Dob	3–0	2–3	
PAOK Thessaloniki (Greece)	3–3	(Turkey) İstanbul BBSK	3–2	2–3	15–13

=== First leg ===
Date	Time		Score		Set 1	Set 2	Set 3	Set 4	Set 5	Total	Report
23 Oct	19:00	United Volleys Frankfurt (Germany)	3–0	(Austria) SK Posojilnica Aich/Dob	25–21	25–21	25–21			75–63	Report
23 Oct	20:15	CAI Teruel (Spain)	3–2	(France) Chaumont VB 52 Haute Marne	24–26	25–20	20–25	25–22	15–11	109–104	Report
24 Oct	18:00	PAOK Thessaloniki (Greece)	3–2	(Turkey) İstanbul BBSK	25–20	25–13	19–25	22–25	15–11	106–94	Report
24 Oct	19:00	Neftohimic 2010 Burgas (Bulgaria)	2–3	(Serbia) Vojvodina Novi Sad	25–20	25–22	20–25	19–25	11–15	100–107	Report

=== Second leg ===
Date	Time		Score		Set 1	Set 2	Set 3	Set 4	Set 5	Total	Report
30 Oct	20:30	Chaumont VB 52 Haute Marne (France)	3–0	(Spain) CAI Teruel	25–16	25–22	25–20			75–58	Report
31 Oct	17:00	İstanbul BBSK (Turkey)	3–2	(Greece) PAOK Thessaloniki	21–25	25–22	21–25	25–22	15–12	107–106	Report
Golden set		İstanbul BBSK (Turkey)	13–15	(Greece) PAOK Thessaloniki							
31 Oct	20:25	SK Posojilnica Aich/Dob (Austria)	3–2	(Germany) United Volleys Frankfurt	20–25	17–25	25–18	25–15	15–13	102–96	Report
31 Oct	20:30	Vojvodina Novi Sad (Serbia)	3–0	(Bulgaria) Neftohimic 2010 Burgas	25–17	25–22	25–22			75–61	Report

== Third round ==
- 4 teams compete in the third round.
- Winners advance to the League round and losers qualify to CEV Cup.

Team 1	Agg.	Team 2	1st leg	2nd leg
Chaumont VB 52 Haute Marne (France)	6–0	(Serbia) Vojvodina Novi Sad	3–0	3–0
PAOK Thessaloniki (Greece)	0–6	(Germany) United Volleys Frankfurt	0–3	1–3

=== First leg ===
Date	Time		Score		Set 1	Set 2	Set 3	Set 4	Set 5	Total	Report
7 Nov	19:00	PAOK Thessaloniki (Greece)	0–3	(Germany) United Volleys Frankfurt	25–27	17–25	21–25			63–77	Report
7 Nov	20:30	Chaumont VB 52 Haute Marne (France)	3–0	(Serbia) Vojvodina Novi Sad	25–22	25–16	25–23			75–61	Report

=== Second leg ===
Date	Time		Score		Set 1	Set 2	Set 3	Set 4	Set 5	Total	Report
13 Nov	19:00	United Volleys Frankfurt (Germany)	3–1	(Greece) PAOK Thessaloniki	25–17	25–17	21–25	27–25		98–84	Report
13 Nov	20:00	Vojvodina Novi Sad (Serbia)	0–3	(France) Chaumont VB 52 Haute Marne	23–25	23–25	17–25			63–75	Report
