= 2021–22 CEV Champions League qualification =

This article shows the qualification phase for the 2021–22 CEV Champions League. 17 teams will play in the qualification round. The two remaining teams will join the other 18 teams automatically qualified to the League round based on the European Cups' Ranking List. All 15 eliminated teams will compete in the 2021–22 CEV Cup.

== Participating teams ==
The Drawing of Lots took place on 25 June 2021 in Luxembourg City.

Rank	Country	Team(s)	Outcome (Qualified to)
10	Czech Republic	ČEZ Karlovarsko	CEV Cup
11	Greece	Olympiacos Piraeus	CEV Cup
12	Belarus	Shakhtior Soligorsk	CEV Cup
13	Finland	Ford Levoranta Sastamala	CEV Cup
14	Portugal	Sport Lisboa e Benfica	CEV Champions League
15	Bulgaria	Hebar Pazardzhik	CEV Champions League
16	Austria	UVC Holding Graz	CEV Cup
17	Croatia	Mladost Zagreb	CEV Cup
18	Netherlands	Draisma Dynamo Apeldoorn	CEV Cup
19	Montenegro	OK Budva	CEV Cup
21	Bosnia and Herzegovina	Mladost Brčko	CEV Cup
22	Spain	CDV Guaguas Las Palmas	CEV Cup
23	Romania	CSM Arcada Galați	CEV Cup
26	England	IBB Polonia London	CEV Cup
34	Estonia	Bigbank Tartu	CEV Cup
52	Switzerland	Lindaren Volley Amriswil	CEV Cup
53	Slovakia	Rieker UJS Komárno	CEV Cup

== Preliminary round ==
- All times are local

Team 1	Agg.	Team 2	1st leg	2nd leg
Bigbank Tartu (Estonia)	4–2	(Switzerland) Lindaren Volley Amriswil	3–0	2–3

=== First leg ===
Date	Time		Score		Set 1	Set 2	Set 3	Set 4	Set 5	Total	Report
22 Sep	19:00	Bigbank Tartu (Estonia)	3–0	(Switzerland) Lindaren Volley Amriswil	25–20	25–22	25–20			75–62	Report

=== Second leg ===
Date	Time		Score		Set 1	Set 2	Set 3	Set 4	Set 5	Total	Report
29 Sep	19:00	Lindaren Volley Amriswil (Switzerland)	3–2	(Estonia) Bigbank Tartu	19–25	25–23	21–25	25–21	15–10	105–104	Report

== First round ==
- All times are local

Team 1	Agg.	Team 2	1st leg	2nd leg	Golden Set
CDV Guaguas Las Palmas (Spain)	3–3	(Bulgaria) Hebar Pazardzhik	3–0	1–3	13–15
IBB Polonia London (England)	1–5	(Belarus) Shakhtior Soligorsk	2–3	1–3	
Rieker UJS Komárno (Slovakia)	6–0	(Austria) UVC Holding Graz	3–0	3–1	
Mladost Brčko (Bosnia and Herzegovina)	0–6	(Greece) Olympiacos Piraeus	0–3	0–3	
Bigbank Tartu (Estonia)	0–6	(Portugal) Sport Lisboa e Benfica	1–3	1–3	
Draisma Dynamo Apeldoorn (Netherlands)	1–5	(Finland) Ford Levoranta Sastamala	2–3	1–3	
OK Budva (Montenegro)	2–4	(Croatia) Mladost Zagreb	3–2	1–3	
CSM Arcada Galați (Romania)	3–3	(Czech Republic) ČEZ Karlovarsko	3–2	2–3	10–15

=== First leg ===
Date	Time		Score		Set 1	Set 2	Set 3	Set 4	Set 5	Total	Report
5 Oct	19:30	CDV Guaguas Las Palmas (Spain)	3–0	(Bulgaria) Hebar Pazardzhik	25–21	25–22	25–21			75–64	Report
5 Oct	19:00	IBB Polonia London (England)	2–3	(Belarus) Shakhtior Soligorsk	25–17	15–25	23–25	25–20	13–15	101–102	Report
6 Oct	20:00	Rieker UJS Komárno (Slovakia)	3–0	(Austria) UVC Holding Graz	25–18	25–16	26–24			76–58	Report
6 Oct	18:00	Mladost Brčko (Bosnia and Herzegovina)	0–3	(Greece) Olympiacos Piraeus	14–25	11–25	16–25			41–75	Report
6 Oct	19:00	Bigbank Tartu (Estonia)	1–3	(Portugal) Sport Lisboa e Benfica	24–26	25–22	18–25	16–25		83–98	Report
6 Oct	20:00	Draisma Dynamo Apeldoorn (Netherlands)	2–3	(Finland) Ford Levoranta Sastamala	25–16	21–25	25–19	28–30	19–21	118–111	Report
6 Oct	18:00	OK Budva (Montenegro)	3–2	(Croatia) Mladost Zagreb	25–20	20–25	25–22	19–25	15–10	104–102	Report
6 Oct	18:00	CSM Arcada Galați (Romania)	3–2	(Czech Republic) ČEZ Karlovarsko	25–18	27–29	25–22	19–25	15–7	111–101	Report

=== Second leg ===
Date	Time		Score		Set 1	Set 2	Set 3	Set 4	Set 5	Total	Report
14 Oct	19:00	Hebar Pazardzhik (Bulgaria)	3–1	(Spain) CDV Guaguas Las Palmas	25–20	25–27	25–16	25–18		100–81	Report
Golden set		Hebar Pazardzhik (Bulgaria)	15–13	(Spain) CDV Guaguas Las Palmas							
7 Oct	19:00	Shakhtior Soligorsk (Belarus)	3–1	(England) IBB Polonia London	25–16	25–20	22–25	25–23		97–84	Report
14 Oct	20:15	UVC Holding Graz (Austria)	1–3	(Slovakia) Rieker UJS Komárno	25–17	23–25	16–25	16–25		80–92	Report
13 Oct	19:00	Olympiacos Piraeus (Greece)	3–0	(Bosnia and Herzegovina) Mladost Brčko	25–16	25–21	25–17			75–54	Report
13 Oct	20:00	Sport Lisboa e Benfica (Portugal)	3–1	(Estonia) Bigbank Tartu	25–21	17–25	25–21	25–20		92–87	Report
13 Oct	18:30	Ford Levoranta Sastamala (Finland)	3–1	(Netherlands) Draisma Dynamo Apeldoorn	25–20	25–21	27–29	25–23		102–93	Report
14 Oct	19:00	Mladost Zagreb (Croatia)	3–1	(Montenegro) OK Budva	19–25	25–18	25–20	25–22		94–85	Report
13 Oct	18:00	ČEZ Karlovarsko (Czech Republic)	3–2	(Romania) CSM Arcada Galați	25–19	22–25	32–30	22–25	15–9	116–108	Report
Golden set		ČEZ Karlovarsko (Czech Republic)	15–10	(Romania) CSM Arcada Galați							

== Second round ==
- All times are local

Team 1	Agg.	Team 2	1st leg	2nd leg
Hebar Pazardzhik (Bulgaria)	4–2	(Belarus) Shakhtior Soligorsk	2–3	3–1
Rieker UJS Komárno (Slovakia)	0–6	(Greece) Olympiacos Piraeus	1–3	0–3
Sport Lisboa e Benfica (Portugal)	6–0	(Finland) Ford Levoranta Sastamala	3–0	3–1
Mladost Zagreb (Croatia)	1–5	(Czech Republic) ČEZ Karlovarsko	1–3	2–3

=== First leg ===
Date	Time		Score		Set 1	Set 2	Set 3	Set 4	Set 5	Total	Report
20 Oct	19:00	Hebar Pazardzhik (Bulgaria)	2–3	(Belarus) Shakhtior Soligorsk	22–25	25–15	25–14	19–25	9–15	100–94	Report
20 Oct	20:15	Rieker UJS Komárno (Slovakia)	1–3	(Greece) Olympiacos Piraeus	25–22	38–40	21–25	22–25		106–112	Report
21 Oct	20:00	Sport Lisboa e Benfica (Portugal)	3–0	(Finland) Ford Levoranta Sastamala	25–23	25–21	25–18			75–62	Report
20 Oct	19:00	Mladost Zagreb (Croatia)	1–3	(Czech Republic) ČEZ Karlovarsko	25–21	17–25	24–26	8–25		74–97	Report

=== Second leg ===
Date	Time		Score		Set 1	Set 2	Set 3	Set 4	Set 5	Total	Report
28 Oct	17:30	Shakhtior Soligorsk (Belarus)	1–3	(Bulgaria) Hebar Pazardzhik	25–15	21–25	16–25	22–25		84–90	Report
27 Oct	17:00	Olympiacos Piraeus (Greece)	3–0	(Slovakia) Rieker UJS Komárno	25–21	25–19	31–29			81–69	Report
27 Oct	18:30	Ford Levoranta Sastamala (Finland)	1–3	(Portugal) Sport Lisboa e Benfica	27–25	20–25	21–25	14–25		82–100	Report
27 Oct	19:00	ČEZ Karlovarsko (Czech Republic)	3–2	(Croatia) Mladost Zagreb	18–25	18–25	25–19	27–25	15–9	103–103	Report

== Third round ==
- All times are local

Team 1	Agg.	Team 2	1st leg	2nd leg
Hebar Pazardzhik (Bulgaria)	6–0	(Greece) Olympiacos Piraeus	3–1	3–1
Sport Lisboa e Benfica (Portugal)	4–2	(Czech Republic) ČEZ Karlovarsko	2–3	3–1

=== First leg ===
Date	Time		Score		Set 1	Set 2	Set 3	Set 4	Set 5	Total	Report
3 Nov	19:00	Hebar Pazardzhik (Bulgaria)	3–1	(Greece) Olympiacos Piraeus	26–24	25–18	20–25	25–23		96–90	Report
4 Nov	20:00	Sport Lisboa e Benfica (Portugal)	2–3	(Czech Republic) ČEZ Karlovarsko	16–25	22–25	25–22	28–26	12–15	103–113	Report

=== Second leg ===
Date	Time		Score		Set 1	Set 2	Set 3	Set 4	Set 5	Total	Report
10 Nov	19:00	Olympiacos Piraeus (Greece)	1–3	(Bulgaria) Hebar Pazardzhik	25–21	23–25	19–25	23–25		90–96	Report
10 Nov	18:00	ČEZ Karlovarsko (Czech Republic)	1–3	(Portugal) Sport Lisboa e Benfica	25–20	23–25	21–25	23–25		92–95	Report
