= 2017–18 CEV Cup =

- League: CEV Cup
- Sport: Volleyball
- Duration: 21 November 2017 – 10 April 2018

Finals
- Champions: (Russia) Belogorie Belgorod
- Runners-up: (Turkey) Ziraat Bankası Ankara
- Finals MVP: (Russia) Konstantin Bakun (BEL)

CEV Cup seasons
- ← 2016–17 2018–19 →

The 2017–18 CEV Cup was the 46th edition of the European CEV Cup volleyball club tournament.

== Participating teams ==
The number of participants on the basis of ranking list for European Cup Competitions:

Rank	Country	Number of teams	Teams
1	Russia	1	Belogorie Belgorod
2	France	2	Montpellier UC, GFC Ajaccio VB
3	Serbia	3	OK Vojvodina Novi Sad, OK Novi Pazar, OK Ribnica Kraljevo
4	Poland	1	Asseco Resovia
5	Italy	1	Calzedonia Verona
6	Bulgaria	2	Neftohimic 2010 Burgas, CSKA Sofia
7	Belgium	1	Lindemans Aalst
8	Germany	2	SWD Powervolleys Düren, United Volleys Rhein-Main
8	Slovenia	2	ACH Volley Ljubljana, Calcit Kamnik
10	Finland	2	Hurrikaani Loimaa, Perungan Pojat Rovaniemi
11	Czech Republic	3	VK Dukla Liberec, Jihostroj České Budějovice, VK Kladno
11	Netherlands	2	Draisma Dynamo Apeldoorn, Abiant Goningen
15	Turkey	1	Ziraat Bankası Ankara
18	Ukraine	1	Barkom-Kazhany Lviv
22	Belarus	1	Shakhtyor Soligorsk
23	Croatia	1	MOK Rijeka
24	Montenegro	1	Jedinstvo Bijelo Polje
27	Romania	2	CS Arcada Galați, SCM U Craiova
28	Israel	2	Hapoel Mate-Asher Akko, Maccabi Tel Aviv
29	Austria	1	SK Posojilnica Aich/Dob
35	Switzerland	1	Volley Amriswil
38	Cyprus	1	Omonia Nicosia
38	Bosnia and Herzegovina	1	OK Mladost Brčko
–	Kosovo	1	KV Luboteni Ferizaj

== Main phase ==
=== 32nd Finals ===
Team 1	Agg.	Team 2	1st leg	2nd leg
Hapoel Mate-Asher Akko (Israel)	6–0	(Bosnia and Herzegovina) OK Mladost Brčko	3–0	3–0
MOK Rijeka (Croatia)	0–6	(Montenegro) Jedinstvo Bijelo Polje	0–3	1–3
Barkom-Kazhany Lviv (Ukraine)	4–2	(Israel) Maccabi Tel Aviv	3–1	2–3
Draisma Dynamo Apeldoorn (Netherlands)	6–0	(Kosovo) KV Luboteni Ferizaj	3–0	3–0

==== First leg ====
Date	Time		Score		Set 1	Set 2	Set 3	Set 4	Set 5	Total	Report
21 Nov	17:00	Hapoel Mate-Asher Akko (Israel)	3–0	(Bosnia and Herzegovina) OK Mladost Brčko	25–21	29–27	25–20			79–68	Report
22 Nov	19:00	MOK Rijeka (Croatia)	0–3	(Montenegro) Jedinstvo Bijelo Polje	22–25	18–25	19–25			59–75	Report
22 Nov	19:00	Barkom-Kazhany Lviv (Ukraine)	3–1	(Israel) Maccabi Tel Aviv	25–18	25–27	25–19	25–16		100–80	Report
22 Nov	19:00	Draisma Dynamo Apeldoorn (Netherlands)	3–0	(Kosovo) KV Luboteni Ferizaj	25–11	25–16	26–24			76–51	Report

==== Second leg ====
Date	Time		Score		Set 1	Set 2	Set 3	Set 4	Set 5	Total	Report
29 Nov	18:00	OK Mladost Brčko (Bosnia and Herzegovina)	0–3	(Israel) Hapoel Mate-Asher Akko	30–32	24–26	17–25			71–83	Report
30 Nov	18:00	Jedinstvo Bijelo Polje (Montenegro)	3–1	(Croatia) MOK Rijeka	25–19	26–28	25–14	25–18		101–79	Report
28 Nov	19:00	Maccabi Tel Aviv (Israel)	3–2	(Ukraine) Barkom-Kazhany Lviv	25–22	25–21	24–26	19–25	15–13	108–107	Report
30 Nov	19:00	KV Luboteni Ferizaj (Kosovo)	0–3	(Netherlands) Draisma Dynamo Apeldoorn	22–25	18–25	19–25			59–75	Report

=== 16th finals ===
Team 1	Agg.	Team 2	1st leg	2nd leg	Golden Set
CSKA Sofia (Bulgaria)	0–6	(Russia) Belogorie Belgorod	0–3	0–3	
Hapoel Mate-Asher Akko (Israel)	4–2	(Czech Republic) Jihostroj České Budějovice	2–3	3–1	
OK Novi Pazar (Serbia)	1–5	(Slovenia) ACH Volley Ljubljana	2–3	0–3	
VK Kladno (Czech Republic)	2–4	(Romania) CS Arcada Galați	3–2	0–3	
Calcit Kamnik (Slovenia)	2–4	(France) GFC Ajaccio VB	3–2	0–3	
Volley Amriswil (Switzerland)	4–2	(Cyprus) Omonia Nicosia	3–0	2–3	
Barkom-Kazhany Lviv (Ukraine)	0–6	(Serbia) OK Vojvodina Novi Sad	0–3	1–3	
Perungan Pojat Rovaniemi (Finland)	0–6	(Poland) Asseco Resovia	0–3	0–3	
SCM U Craiova (Romania)	1–5	(Turkey) Ziraat Bankası Ankara	0–3	2–3	
SWD Powervolleys Düren (Germany)	3–3	(Netherlands) Abiant Goningen	3–0	1–3	15–13
Jedinstvo Bijelo Polje (Montenegro)	0–6	(Austria) SK Posojilnica Aich/Dob	0–3	0–3	
Draisma Dynamo Apeldoorn (Netherlands)	0–6	(Belgium) Lindemans Aalst	0–3	0–3	
Montpellier UC (France)	5–1	(Germany) United Volleys Rhein-Main	3–2	3–0	
Hurrikaani Loimaa (Finland)	0–6	(Belarus) Shakhtyor Soligorsk	0–3	1–3	
VK Dukla Liberec (Czech Republic)	5–1	(Bulgaria) Neftohimic 2010 Burgas	3–2	3–0	
OK Ribnica Kraljevo (Serbia)	0–6	(Italy) Calzedonia Verona	0–3	1–3	

==== First leg ====
Date	Time		Score		Set 1	Set 2	Set 3	Set 4	Set 5	Total	Report
7 Dec	19:00	CSKA Sofia (Bulgaria)	0–3	(Russia) Belogorie Belgorod	23–25	20–25	18–25			61–75	Report
7 Dec	17:00	Hapoel Mate-Asher Akko (Israel)	2–3	(Czech Republic) Jihostroj České Budějovice	25–23	25–22	19–25	20–25	15–17	104–112	Report
6 Dec	18:00	OK Novi Pazar (Serbia)	2–3	(Slovenia) ACH Volley Ljubljana	25–20	25–23	22–25	23–25	11–15	106–108	Report
7 Dec	18:00	VK Kladno (Czech Republic)	3–2	(Romania) CS Arcada Galați	27–29	29–27	21–25	25–22	15–12	117–115	Report
6 Dec	19:00	Calcit Kamnik (Slovenia)	3–2	(France) GFC Ajaccio VB	25–22	19–25	21–25	25–15	16–14	106–101	Report
6 Dec	19:00	Volley Amriswil (Switzerland)	3–0	(Cyprus) Omonia Nicosia	25–19	28–26	25–20			78–65	Report
6 Dec	19:00	Barkom-Kazhany Lviv (Ukraine)	0–3	(Serbia) OK Vojvodina Novi Sad	16–25	23–25	31–33			70–83	Report
7 Dec	18:00	Perungan Pojat Rovaniemi (Finland)	0–3	(Poland) Asseco Resovia	20–25	23–25	9–25			52–75	Report
5 Dec	18:00	SCM U Craiova (Romania)	0–3	(Turkey) Ziraat Bankası Ankara	22–25	16–25	17–25			55–75	Report
6 Dec	19:00	SWD Powervolleys Düren (Germany)	3–0	(Netherlands) Abiant Goningen	25–23	25–18	25–19			75–60	Report
6 Dec	18:00	Jedinstvo Bijelo Polje (Montenegro)	0–3	(Austria) SK Posojilnica Aich/Dob	22–25	13–25	22–25			57–75	Report
7 Dec	19:00	Draisma Dynamo Apeldoorn (Netherlands)	0–3	(Belgium) Lindemans Aalst	11–25	9–25	19–25			39–75	Report
6 Dec	20:00	Montpellier UC (France)	3–2	(Germany) United Volleys Rhein-Main	20–25	25–21	32–30	20–25	15–10	112–111	Report
7 Dec	18:30	Hurrikaani Loimaa (Finland)	0–3	(Belarus) Shakhtyor Soligorsk	19–25	18–25	20–25			57–75	Report
7 Dec	18:00	VK Dukla Liberec (Czech Republic)	3–2	(Bulgaria) Neftohimic 2010 Burgas	17–25	25–22	21–25	25–14	15–11	103–97	Report
6 Dec	19:00	OK Ribnica Kraljevo (Serbia)	0–3	(Italy) Calzedonia Verona	17–25	15–25	19–25			51–75	Report

==== Second leg ====
Date	Time		Score		Set 1	Set 2	Set 3	Set 4	Set 5	Total	Report
19 Dec	19:00	Belogorie Belgorod (Russia)	3–0	(Bulgaria) CSKA Sofia	25–15	25–23	25–10			75–48	Report
20 Dec	18:00	Jihostroj České Budějovice (Czech Republic)	1–3	(Israel) Hapoel Mate-Asher Akko	23–25	23–25	25–17	20–25		91–92	Report
19 Dec	18:00	ACH Volley Ljubljana (Slovenia)	3–0	(Serbia) OK Novi Pazar	25–13	25–23	26–24			76–60	Report
20 Dec	18:00	CS Arcada Galați (Romania)	3–0	(Czech Republic) VK Kladno	25–21	25–23	26–24			76–68	Report
20 Dec	20:00	GFC Ajaccio VB (France)	3–0	(Slovenia) Calcit Kamnik	25–21	25–19	27–25			77–65	Report
20 Dec	20:00	Omonia Nicosia (Cyprus)	3–2	(Switzerland) Volley Amriswil	25–22	24–26	25–17	15–25	17–15	106–105	Report
20 Dec	18:00	OK Vojvodina Novi Sad (Serbia)	3–1	(Ukraine) Barkom-Kazhany Lviv	25–22	22–25	32–30	25–16		104–93	Report
19 Dec	20:30	Asseco Resovia (Poland)	3–0	(Finland) Perungan Pojat Rovaniemi	25–22	25–20	25–19			75–61	Report
20 Dec	19:00	Ziraat Bankası Ankara (Turkey)	3–2	(Romania) SCM U Craiova	13–25	25–21	23–25	25–18	15–6	101–95	Report
21 Dec	20:00	Abiant Goningen (Netherlands)	3–1	(Germany) SWD Powervolleys Düren	25–18	16–25	25–23	25–22		91–88	Report
Golden set		Abiant Goningen (Netherlands)	13–15	(Germany) SWD Powervolleys Düren							
20 Dec	19:00	SK Posojilnica Aich/Dob (Austria)	3–0	(Montenegro) Jedinstvo Bijelo Polje	25–19	25–19	25–20			75–58	Report
20 Dec	20:30	Lindemans Aalst (Belgium)	3–0	(Netherlands) Draisma Dynamo Apeldoorn	25–20	25–16	25–16			75–52	Report
21 Dec	19:30	United Volleys Rhein-Main (Germany)	0–3	(France) Montpellier UC	27–29	21–25	19–25			67–79	Report
20 Dec	18:00	Shakhtyor Soligorsk (Belarus)	3–1	(Finland) Hurrikaani Loimaa	25–23	28–30	25–23	25–18		103–94	Report
19 Dec	19:00	Neftohimic 2010 Burgas (Bulgaria)	0–3	(Czech Republic) VK Dukla Liberec	18–25	21–25	18–25			57–75	Report
20 Dec	20:30	Calzedonia Verona (Italy)	3–1	(Serbia) OK Ribnica Kraljevo	25–16	25–21	23–25	25–12		98–74	Report

=== 8th finals ===
Team 1	Agg.	Team 2	1st leg	2nd leg
Hapoel Mate-Asher Akko (Israel)	0–6	(Russia) Belogorie Belgorod	0–3	0–3
ACH Volley Ljubljana (Slovenia)	5–1	(Romania) CS Arcada Galați	3–0	3–2
GFC Ajaccio VB (France)	6–0	(Switzerland) Volley Amriswil	3–0	3–0
OK Vojvodina Novi Sad (Serbia)	0–6	(Poland) Asseco Resovia	1–3	0–3
Ziraat Bankası Ankara (Turkey)	5–1	(Germany) SWD Powervolleys Düren	3–0	3–2
SK Posojilnica Aich/Dob (Austria)	0–6	(Belgium) Lindemans Aalst	1–3	0–3
Shakhtyor Soligorsk (Belarus)	2–4	(France) Montpellier UC	1–3	3–2
VK Dukla Liberec (Czech Republic)	0–6	(Italy) Calzedonia Verona	1–3	0–3

==== First leg ====
Date	Time		Score		Set 1	Set 2	Set 3	Set 4	Set 5	Total	Report
18 Jan	19:30	Hapoel Mate-Asher Akko (Israel)	0–3	(Russia) Belogorie Belgorod	18–25	22–25	20–25			60–75	Report
16 Jan	18:00	ACH Volley Ljubljana (Slovenia)	3–0	(Romania) CS Arcada Galați	25–19	27–25	25–22			77–66	Report
31 Jan	20:00	GFC Ajaccio VB (France)	3–0	(Switzerland) Volley Amriswil	25–11	25–12	25–20			75–43	Report
17 Jan	18:00	OK Vojvodina Novi Sad (Serbia)	1–3	(Poland) Asseco Resovia	21–25	22–25	25–21	20–25		88–96	Report
16 Jan	19:00	Ziraat Bankası Ankara (Turkey)	3–0	(Germany) SWD Powervolleys Düren	25–20	26–24	25–19			76–63	Report
17 Jan	19:00	SK Posojilnica Aich/Dob (Austria)	1–3	(Belgium) Lindemans Aalst	22–25	14–25	29–27	20–25		85–102	Report
16 Jan	18:00	Shakhtyor Soligorsk (Belarus)	1–3	(France) Montpellier UC	10–25	16–25	28–26	19–25		73–101	Report
17 Jan	18:00	VK Dukla Liberec (Czech Republic)	1–3	(Italy) Calzedonia Verona	25–23	21–25	12–25	19–25		77–98	Report

==== Second leg ====
Date	Time		Score		Set 1	Set 2	Set 3	Set 4	Set 5	Total	Report
30 Jan	19:00	Belogorie Belgorod (Russia)	3–0	(Israel) Hapoel Mate-Asher Akko	25–21	25–17	25–18			75–56	Report
30 Jan	18:00	CS Arcada Galați (Romania)	2–3	(Slovenia) ACH Volley Ljubljana	24–26	25–19	25–21	19–25	13–15	106–106	Report
17 Jan	19:00	Volley Amriswil (Switzerland)	0–3	(France) GFC Ajaccio VB	14–25	16–25	19–25			49–75	Report
31 Jan	18:00	Asseco Resovia (Poland)	3–0	(Serbia) OK Vojvodina Novi Sad	25–20	28–26	25–21			78–67	Report
31 Jan	19:00	SWD Powervolleys Düren (Germany)	2–3	(Turkey) Ziraat Bankası Ankara	25–27	18–25	25–19	25–23	9–15	102–109	Report
31 Jan	20:30	Lindemans Aalst (Belgium)	3–0	(Austria) SK Posojilnica Aich/Dob	25–23	25–15	25–21			75–59	Report
31 Jan	20:00	Montpellier UC (France)	2–3	(Belarus) Shakhtyor Soligorsk	25–23	23–25	25–21	23–25	9–15	105–109	Report
31 Jan	20:00	Calzedonia Verona (Italy)	3–0	(Czech Republic) VK Dukla Liberec	25–19	25–16	28–26			78–61	Report

=== 4th finals ===
Team 1	Agg.	Team 2	1st leg	2nd leg
Belogorie Belgorod (Russia)	6–0	(Slovenia) ACH Volley Ljubljana	3–0	3–1
Asseco Resovia (Poland)	6–0	(France) GFC Ajaccio VB	3–0	3–0
Ziraat Bankası Ankara (Turkey)	6–0	(Belgium) Lindemans Aalst	3–1	3–1
Calzedonia Verona (Italy)	6–0	(France) Montpellier UC	3–1	3–1

==== First leg ====
Date	Time		Score		Set 1	Set 2	Set 3	Set 4	Set 5	Total	Report
14 Feb	19:00	Belogorie Belgorod (Russia)	3–0	(Slovenia) ACH Volley Ljubljana	25–20	25–15	25–13			75–48	Report
14 Feb	18:00	Asseco Resovia (Poland)	3–0	(France) GFC Ajaccio VB	25–22	30–28	25–19			80–69	Report
15 Feb	19:00	Ziraat Bankası Ankara (Turkey)	3–1	(Belgium) Lindemans Aalst	23–25	25–19	25–21	25–20		98–85	Report
14 Feb	20:00	Calzedonia Verona (Italy)	3–1	(France) Montpellier UC	26–24	27–25	22–25	25–22		100–96	Report

==== Second leg ====
Date	Time		Score		Set 1	Set 2	Set 3	Set 4	Set 5	Total	Report
1 Mar	18:00	ACH Volley Ljubljana (Slovenia)	1–3	(Russia) Belogorie Belgorod	25–23	21–25	26–28	19–25		91–101	Report
28 Feb	20:00	GFC Ajaccio VB (France)	0–3	(Poland) Asseco Resovia	20–25	17–25	20–25			57–75	Report
27 Feb	20:30	Lindemans Aalst (Belgium)	1–3	(Turkey) Ziraat Bankası Ankara	25–18	28–30	19–25	19–25		91–98	Report
27 Feb	20:00	Montpellier UC (France)	1–3	(Italy) Calzedonia Verona	25–18	17–25	18–25	24–26		84–94	Report

== Final phase ==
=== Semi finals ===
Team 1	Agg.	Team 2	1st leg	2nd leg
Belogorie Belgorod (Russia)	6–0	(Poland) Asseco Resovia	3–0	3–0
Calzedonia Verona (Italy)	2–4	(Turkey) Ziraat Bankası Ankara	1–3	3–2

==== First leg ====
Date	Time		Score		Set 1	Set 2	Set 3	Set 4	Set 5	Total	Report
13 Mar	19:00	Belogorie Belgorod (Russia)	3–0	(Poland) Asseco Resovia	25–19	25–18	25–17			75–54	Report
13 Mar	20:30	Calzedonia Verona (Italy)	1–3	(Turkey) Ziraat Bankası Ankara	25–18	22–25	21–25	20–25		88–93	Report

==== Second leg ====
Date	Time		Score		Set 1	Set 2	Set 3	Set 4	Set 5	Total	Report
20 Mar	18:00	Asseco Resovia (Poland)	0–3	(Russia) Belogorie Belgorod	24–26	22–25	21–25			67–76	Report
20 Mar	19:00	Ziraat Bankası Ankara (Turkey)	2–3	(Italy) Calzedonia Verona	20–25	20–25	25–20	26–24	11–15	102–109	Report

=== Final ===
==== First leg ====
Date	Time		Score		Set 1	Set 2	Set 3	Set 4	Set 5	Total	Report
3 Apr	19:00	Belogorie Belgorod (Russia)	3–0	(Turkey) Ziraat Bankası Ankara	25–13	25–15	25–14			75–42	Report

==== Second leg ====
Date	Time		Score		Set 1	Set 2	Set 3	Set 4	Set 5	Total	Report
10 Apr	19:00	Ziraat Bankası Ankara (Turkey)	2–3	(Russia) Belogorie Belgorod	25–21	26–24	26–28	21–25	11–15	109–113	Report

== Final standing ==
Rank	Team
1st place, gold medalist(s)	(Russia) Belogorie Belgorod
2nd place, silver medalist(s)	(Turkey) Ziraat Bankası Ankara
Semifinalists	(Poland) Asseco Resovia
Semifinalists	(Italy) Calzedonia Verona

2018 CEV Cup winner
(Russia)
Belogorie Belgorod
2nd title

Aleksey Obmochaev, Alexander Safonov, Sergey Grankin, Nikolay Nikolov, Sergey Tetyukhin, Konstantin Bakun, Roman Danilov, Roman Poroshin, Nikita Eremin, Dmitriy Muserskiy, Ruslan Khanipov, Ilia Spodobets, Maxim Zhigalov, Yan Tereshchenko
Head coach
Gennady Shipulin
