= 2018–19 CEV Cup =

- League: CEV Cup
- Sport: Volleyball
- Duration: 6 November 2018 – 26 March 2019

Finals
- Champions: (Italy) Diatec Trentino
- Runners-up: (Turkey) Galatasaray İstanbul
- Finals MVP: (Serbia) Uroš Kovačević (Diatec Trentino)

CEV Cup seasons
- ← 2017–18 2019–20 →

The 2018–19 CEV Cup was the 47th edition of the European CEV Cup volleyball club tournament.

== Participating teams ==
The number of participants on the basis of ranking list for European Cup Competitions:

Rank	Country	Number of teams	Teams
1	Russia	1	Kuzbass Kemerovo
2	Italy	1	Diatec Trentino
3	Turkey	2	Galatasaray İstanbul, İstanbul BBSK
4	France	2	Tourcoing Lille Métropole Volley-Ball, GFCO Ajaccio Volley-Ball
5	Belgium	2	Prefaxis Menen, Lindemans Aalst
6	Czech Republic	2	VK Dukla Liberec, VK Kladno
7	Switzerland	2	Lindaren Volley Amriswil, Lausanne UC
8	Greece	2	Olympiacos Piraeus, PAOK Thessaloniki
9	Romania	1	CS Arcada Galați
10	Germany	1	Hypo Tirol Alpenvolleys Haching
11	Austria	2	Union Raiffeisen Waldviertel, SK Posojilnica Aich/Dob
11	Netherlands	2	Orion Doetinchem, Abiant Lycurgus
14	Finland	2	Hurrikaani Loimaa, Ford Store Levoranta Sastamala
15	Belarus	1	Shakhtyor Soligorsk
16	Serbia	2	OK Novi Pazar, Vojvodina Novi Sad
19	Ukraine	2	Barkom-Kazhany, Novator Khmelnytskyi
20	Croatia	1	Mladost Zagreb
21	Bulgaria	2	Montana Volley, Neftohimic 2010 Burgas
25	Bosnia and Herzegovina	1	Mladost Brčko
27	Kosovo	1	KV Peja
28	Poland	1	Indykpol AZS Olsztyn
28	Norway	2	Viking TIF Bergen, Førde VBK
30	Montenegro	1	Jedinstvo Bijelo Polje
31	Hungary	1	Vegyész RC Kazincbarcika
31	Spain	1	CV Teruel

== Main Phase ==
=== 32nd Finals ===
Team 1	Agg.	Team 2	1st leg	2nd leg	Golden Set
Barkom-Kazhany (Ukraine)	2–4	(Switzerland) Lausanne UC	3–2	0–3	
Førde VBK (Norway)	3–3	(Ukraine) Novator Khmelnytskyi	3–0	1–3	15–10
Jedinstvo Bijelo Polje (Montenegro)	5–1	(Serbia) OK Novi Pazar	3–1	3–2	
Montana Volley (Bulgaria)	0–6	(Czech Republic) VK Kladno	0–3	0–3	
KV Peja (Kosovo)	0–6	(France) GFCO Ajaccio Volley-Ball	0–3	0–3	
Indykpol AZS Olsztyn (Poland)	6–0	(Finland) Hurrikaani Loimaa	3–0	3–1	

==== First leg ====
Date	Time		Score		Set 1	Set 2	Set 3	Set 4	Set 5	Total	Report
7 Nov	19:00	Barkom-Kazhany (Ukraine)	3–2	(Switzerland) Lausanne UC	25–16	25–21	22–25	18–25	16–14	106–101	Report
8 Nov	18:30	Førde VBK (Norway)	3–0	(Ukraine) Novator Khmelnytskyi	25–23	25–22	25–23			75–68	Report
7 Nov	18:00	Jedinstvo Bijelo Polje (Montenegro)	3–1	(Serbia) OK Novi Pazar	18–25	25–21	26–24	25–23		94–93	Report
6 Nov	18:00	Montana Volley (Bulgaria)	0–3	(Czech Republic) VK Kladno	18–25	24–26	19–25			61–76	Report
6 Nov	18:00	KV Peja (Kosovo)	0–3	(France) GFCO Ajaccio Volley-Ball	9–25	6–25	11–25			26–75	Report
6 Nov	18:00	Indykpol AZS Olsztyn (Poland)	3–0	(Finland) Hurrikaani Loimaa	25–14	25–16	25–20			75–50	Report

==== Second leg ====
Date	Time		Score		Set 1	Set 2	Set 3	Set 4	Set 5	Total	Report
14 Nov	20:00	Lausanne UC (Switzerland)	3–0	(Ukraine) Barkom-Kazhany	25–18	25–22	25–17			75–57	Report
14 Nov	18:00	Novator Khmelnytskyi (Ukraine)	3–1	(Norway) Førde VBK	21–25	31–29	26–24	25–19		103–97	Report
Golden set		Novator Khmelnytskyi (Ukraine)	10–15	(Norway) Førde VBK							
14 Nov	18:00	OK Novi Pazar (Serbia)	2–3	(Montenegro) Jedinstvo Bijelo Polje	26–24	27–29	22–25	25–20	11–15	111–113	Report
13 Nov	18:00	VK Kladno (Czech Republic)	3–0	(Bulgaria) Montana Volley	26–24	25–21	25–22			76–67	Report
13 Nov	20:00	GFCO Ajaccio Volley-Ball (France)	3–0	(Kosovo) KV Peja	25–14	25–11	25–18			75–43	Report
13 Nov	19:00	Hurrikaani Loimaa (Finland)	1–3	(Poland) Indykpol AZS Olsztyn	17–25	25–17	17–25	20–25		79–92	Report

=== 16th Finals ===
Team 1	Agg.	Team 2	1st leg	2nd leg	Golden Set
Hypo Tirol Alpenvolleys Haching (Germany)	5–1	(Serbia) Vojvodina Novi Sad	3–2	3–1	
Lausanne UC (Switzerland)	0–6	(Italy) Diatec Trentino	0–3	0–3	
Orion Doetinchem (Netherlands)	0–6	(Bosnia and Herzegovina) Mladost Brčko	1–3	1–3	
Lindaren Volley Amriswil (Switzerland)	6–0	(Netherlands) Abiant Lycurgus	3–1	3–1	
Olympiacos Piraeus (Greece)	6–2	(Belarus) Shakhtyor Soligorsk	3–0	3–2	
GFCO Ajaccio Volley-Ball (France)	3–3	(Turkey) İstanbul BBSK	0–3	3–0	12-15
Førde VBK (Norway)	1–5	(Norway) Viking TIF Bergen	2–3	1–3	
Prefaxis Menen (Belgium)	3–3	(Bulgaria) Neftohimic 2010 Burgas	3–2	2–3	14-16
Galatasaray İstanbul (Turkey)	6–0	(Croatia) Mladost Zagreb	3–0	3–0	
VK Dukla Liberec (Czech Republic)	6–0	(Austria) SK Posojilnica Aich/Dob	3–1	3–1	
CS Arcada Galați (Romania)	1–5	(Belgium) Lindemans Aalst	2–3	1–3	
Tourcoing Lille Métropole VB (France)	3–3	(Spain) CAI Teruel	0–3	3–0	13-15
Union Raiffeisen Waldviertel (Austria)	0–6	(Finland) Ford Store Levoranta Sastamala	0–3	0–3	
VK Kladno (Czech Republic)	5–1	(Hungary) Vegyész RC Kazincbarcika	3–1	3–2	
Jedinstvo Bijelo Polje (Montenegro)	0–6	(Russia) Kuzbass Kemerovo	0–3	0–3	
Indykpol AZS Olsztyn (Poland)	4–2	(Greece) PAOK Thessaloniki	3–1	2–3	

==== First leg ====
Date	Time		Score		Set 1	Set 2	Set 3	Set 4	Set 5	Total	Report
29 Nov	19:30	Hypo Tirol Alpenvolleys Haching (Germany)	3–2	(Serbia) Vojvodina Novi Sad	25–19	25–20	21–25	25–27	15–13	111–104	Report
21 Nov	20:00	Lausanne UC (Switzerland)	0–3	(Italy) Diatec Trentino	18–25	14–25	20–25			52–75	Report
28 Nov	20:00	Orion Doetinchem (Netherlands)	1–3	(Bosnia and Herzegovina) Mladost Brčko	26–24	21–25	26–28	21–25		94–102	Report
28 Nov	19:00	Lindaren Volley Amriswil (Switzerland)	3–1	(Netherlands) Abiant Lycurgus	22–25	25–21	25–17	25–13		97–76	Report
29 Nov	17:30	Olympiacos Piraeus (Greece)	3–0	(Belarus) Shakhtyor Soligorsk	25–16	25–15	25–22			75–53	Report
27 Nov	20:00	GFCO Ajaccio Volley-Ball (France)	0–3	(Turkey) İstanbul BBSK	20–25	21–25	18–25			59–75	Report
28 Nov	17:30	Førde VBK (Norway)	2–3	(Norway) Viking TIF Bergen	25–19	20–25	25–23	17–25	13–15	100–107	Report
28 Nov	20:30	Prefaxis Menen (Belgium)	3–2	(Bulgaria) Neftohimic 2010 Burgas	21–25	23–25	25–22	25–21	24–22	118–115	Report
28 Nov	19:00	Galatasaray İstanbul (Turkey)	3–0	(Croatia) Mladost Zagreb	25–12	25–19	25–20			75–51	Report
29 Nov	18:00	VK Dukla Liberec (Czech Republic)	3–1	(Austria) SK Posojilnica Aich/Dob	25–19	23–25	25–23	33–31		106–98	Report
27 Nov	18:00	CS Arcada Galați (Romania)	2–3	(Belgium) Lindemans Aalst	25–20	20–25	25–16	22–25	13–15	105–101	Report
27 Nov	20:00	Tourcoing Lille Métropole VB (France)	0–3	(Spain) CAI Teruel	21–25	25–27	24–26			70–78	Report
27 Nov	19:00	Union Raiffeisen Waldviertel (Austria)	0–3	(Finland) Ford Store Levoranta Sastamala	20–25	17–25	16–25			53–75	Report
29 Nov	18:00	VK Kladno (Czech Republic)	3–1	(Hungary) Vegyész RC Kazincbarcika	34–32	21–25	25–18	25–20		105–95	Report
27 Nov	18:00	Jedinstvo Bijelo Polje (Montenegro)	0–3	(Russia) Kuzbass Kemerovo	17–25	20–25	21–25			58–75	Report
28 Nov	18:00	Indykpol AZS Olsztyn (Poland)	3–1	(Greece) PAOK Thessaloniki	25–23	27–29	25–23	25–18		102–93	Report

==== Second leg ====
Date	Time		Score		Set 1	Set 2	Set 3	Set 4	Set 5	Total	Report
5 Dec	20:00	Vojvodina Novi Sad (Serbia)	1–3	(Germany) Hypo Tirol Alpenvolleys Haching	28–30	22–25	25–19	23–25		98–99	Report
6 Dec	20:30	Diatec Trentino (Italy)	3–0	(Switzerland) Lausanne UC	25–22	25–20	25–17			75–59	Report
5 Dec	19:00	Mladost Brčko (Bosnia and Herzegovina)	3–1	(Netherlands) Orion Doetinchem	20–25	25–21	27–25	25–18		97–89	Report
4 Dec	20:00	Abiant Lycurgus (Netherlands)	1–3	(Switzerland) Lindaren Volley Amriswil	20–25	15–25	25–13	21–25		81–88	Report
5 Dec	17:00	Shakhtyor Soligorsk (Belarus)	2–3	(Greece) Olympiacos Piraeus	25–18	27–29	24–26	25–20	8–15	109–108	Report
5 Dec	17:00	İstanbul BBSK (Turkey)	0–3	(France) GFCO Ajaccio Volley-Ball	21–25	21–25	20–25			62–75	Report
Golden set		İstanbul BBSK (Turkey)	15–12	(France) GFCO Ajaccio Volley-Ball							
5 Dec	19:00	Viking TIF Bergen (Norway)	3–1	(Norway) Førde VBK	24–26	25–21	26–24	27–25		102–96	Report
4 Dec	18:30	Neftohimic 2010 Burgas (Bulgaria)	3–2	(Belgium) Prefaxis Menen	25–23	22–25	23–25	30–28	15–8	115–109	Report
Golden set		Neftohimic 2010 Burgas (Bulgaria)	16–14	(Belgium) Prefaxis Menen							
5 Dec	19:00	Mladost Zagreb (Croatia)	0–3	(Turkey) Galatasaray İstanbul	17–25	21–25	20–25			58–75	Report
6 Dec	19:00	SK Posojilnica Aich/Dob (Austria)	1–3	(Czech Republic) VK Dukla Liberec	23–25	23–25	25–23	20–25		91–98	Report
5 Dec	20:30	Lindemans Aalst (Belgium)	3–1	(Romania) CS Arcada Galați	25–21	28–26	22–25	25–21		100–93	Report
5 Dec	20:15	CAI Teruel (Spain)	0–3	(France) Tourcoing Lille Métropole VB	18–25	20–25	19–25			57–75	Report
Golden set		CAI Teruel (Spain)	15–13	(France) Tourcoing Lille Métropole VB							
4 Dec	18:30	Ford Store Levoranta Sastamala (Finland)	3–0	(Austria) Union Raiffeisen Waldviertel	25–15	25–18	25–17			75–50	Report
6 Dec	18:00	Vegyész RC Kazincbarcika (Hungary)	2–3	(Czech Republic) VK Kladno	18–25	26–28	27–25	25–20	13–15	109–113	Report
6 Dec	19:00	Kuzbass Kemerovo (Russia)	3–0	(Montenegro) Jedinstvo Bijelo Polje	25–23	25–16	25–10			75–49	Report
5 Dec	19:00	PAOK Thessaloniki (Greece)	3–2	(Poland) Indykpol AZS Olsztyn	25–22	17–25	16–25	25–21	15–12	98–105	Report

=== 8th Finals ===
Team 1	Agg.	Team 2	1st leg	2nd leg
Diatec Trentino (Italy)	6–0	(Germany) Hypo Tirol Alpenvolleys Haching	3–0	3–1^{1}
Lindaren Volley Amriswil (Switzerland)	6–0	(Bosnia and Herzegovina) Mladost Brčko	3–0	3–1
İstanbul BBSK (Turkey)	0–6	(Greece) Olympiacos Piraeus	1–3	1–3
Viking TIF Bergen (Norway)	0–6	(Bulgaria) Neftohimic 2010 Burgas	1–3	1–3
VK Dukla Liberec (Czech Republic)	1–5	(Turkey) Galatasaray İstanbul	2–3	0–3
Lindemans Aalst (Belgium)	5–1	(Spain) CAI Teruel	3–2	3–1
VK Kladno (Czech Republic)	1–5	(Finland) Ford Store Levoranta Sastamala	2–3	0–3
Kuzbass Kemerovo (Russia)	5–1	(Poland) Indykpol AZS Olsztyn	3–2	3–1

^{1}Both matches have been played in Trento, Italy.

==== First leg ====
Date	Time		Score		Set 1	Set 2	Set 3	Set 4	Set 5	Total	Report
20 Dec	20:30	Diatec Trentino (Italy)	3–0	(Germany) Hypo Tirol Alpenvolleys Haching	25–16	25–19	25–21			75–56	Report
19 Dec	19:00	Lindaren Volley Amriswil (Switzerland)	3–0	(Bosnia and Herzegovina) Mladost Brčko	25–23	25–21	25–19			75–63	Report
19 Dec	17:00	İstanbul BBSK (Turkey)	1–3	(Greece) Olympiacos Piraeus	22–25	19–25	25–23	19–25		85–98	Report
19 Dec	19:00	Viking TIF Bergen (Norway)	1–3	(Bulgaria) Neftohimic 2010 Burgas	13–25	13–25	25–23	31–33		82–106	Report
18 Dec	17:00	VK Dukla Liberec (Czech Republic)	2–3	(Turkey) Galatasaray İstanbul	23–25	25–20	19–25	25–17	12–15	104–102	Report
19 Dec	20:30	Lindemans Aalst (Belgium)	3–2	(Spain) CAI Teruel	25–17	18–25	22–25	26–24	15–10	106–101	Report
20 Dec	18:00	VK Kladno (Czech Republic)	2–3	(Finland) Ford Store Levoranta Sastamala	25–23	18–25	22–25	25–15	20–22	110–110	Report
19 Dec	19:00	Kuzbass Kemerovo (Russia)	3–2	(Poland) Indykpol AZS Olsztyn	25–22	25–14	25–27	23–25	15–11	113–99	Report

==== Second leg ====
Date	Time		Score		Set 1	Set 2	Set 3	Set 4	Set 5	Total	Report
16 Jan	20:30	Hypo Tirol Alpenvolleys Haching (Germany)	1–3	(Italy) Diatec Trentino	25–20	20–25	20–25	19–25		84–95	Report
16 Jan	19:00	Mladost Brčko (Bosnia and Herzegovina)	1–3	(Switzerland) Lindaren Volley Amriswil	24–26	21–25	25–21	18–25		88–97	Report
17 Jan	18:00	Olympiacos Piraeus (Greece)	3–1	(Turkey) İstanbul BBSK	22–25	26–24	25–22	25–19		98–90	Report
17 Jan	18:30	Neftohimic 2010 Burgas (Bulgaria)	3–1	(Norway) Viking TIF Bergen	22–25	25–19	25–19	25–16		97–79	Report
15 Jan	19:00	Galatasaray İstanbul (Turkey)	3–0	(Czech Republic) VK Dukla Liberec	25–15	25–21	25–19			75–55	Report
16 Jan	20:15	CAI Teruel (Spain)	1–3	(Belgium) Lindemans Aalst	25–22	21–25	21–25	23–25		90–97	Report
16 Jan	18:30	Ford Store Levoranta Sastamala (Finland)	3–0	(Czech Republic) VK Kladno	25–20	25–20	25–19			75–59	Report
17 Jan	18:00	Indykpol AZS Olsztyn (Poland)	1–3	(Russia) Kuzbass Kemerovo	28–26	19–25	14–25	19–25		80–101	Report

=== 4th Finals ===
Team 1	Agg.	Team 2	1st leg	2nd leg	Golden Set
Lindaren Volley Amriswil (Switzerland)	0–6	(Italy) Diatec Trentino	0–3	0–3	
Neftohimic 2010 Burgas (Bulgaria)	3–3	(Greece) Olympiacos Piraeus	3–1	0–3	11–15
Galatasaray İstanbul (Turkey)	4–2	(Belgium) Lindemans Aalst	3–1	2–3	
Ford Store Levoranta Sastamala (Finland)	0–6	(Russia) Kuzbass Kemerovo	0–3	0–3	

==== First leg ====
Date	Time		Score		Set 1	Set 2	Set 3	Set 4	Set 5	Total	Report
30 Jan	19:00	Lindaren Volley Amriswil (Switzerland)	0–3	(Italy) Diatec Trentino	15–25	16–25	18–25			49–75	Report
30 Jan	18:30	Neftohimic 2010 Burgas (Bulgaria)	3–1	(Greece) Olympiacos Piraeus	18–25	29–27	25–22	25–21		97–95	Report
30 Jan	19:00	Galatasaray İstanbul (Turkey)	3–1	(Belgium) Lindemans Aalst	25–17	25–20	20–25	25–18		95–80	Report
30 Jan	18:30	Ford Store Levoranta Sastamala (Finland)	0–3	(Russia) Kuzbass Kemerovo	17–25	20–25	24–26			61–76	Report

==== Second leg ====
Date	Time		Score		Set 1	Set 2	Set 3	Set 4	Set 5	Total	Report
13 Feb	20:30	Diatec Trentino (Italy)	3–0	(Switzerland) Lindaren Volley Amriswil	25–22	25–13	25–16			75–51	Report
14 Feb	17:00	Olympiacos Piraeus (Greece)	3–0	(Bulgaria) Neftohimic 2010 Burgas	25–23	25–17	25–19			75–59	Report
Golden set		Olympiacos Piraeus (Greece)	15–11	(Bulgaria) Neftohimic 2010 Burgas							
14 Feb	20:30	Lindemans Aalst (Belgium)	3–2	(Turkey) Galatasaray İstanbul	21–25	25–22	25–16	20–25	15–9	106–97	Report
13 Feb	19:00	Kuzbass Kemerovo (Russia)	3–0	(Finland) Ford Store Levoranta Sastamala	25–18	25–17	25–21			75–56	Report

== Final Phase ==
=== Semifinals ===
Team 1	Agg.	Team 2	1st leg	2nd leg	Golden Set
Olympiacos Piraeus (Greece)	0–6	(Italy) Diatec Trentino	0–3	1–3	
Kuzbass Kemerovo (Russia)	3–3	(Turkey) Galatasaray İstanbul	3–1	1–3	10–15

==== First leg ====
Date	Time		Score		Set 1	Set 2	Set 3	Set 4	Set 5	Total	Report
26 Feb	19:00	Olympiacos Piraeus (Greece)	0–3	(Italy) Diatec Trentino	17–25	19–25	24–26			60–76	Report
26 Feb	19:00	Kuzbass Kemerovo (Russia)	3–1	(Turkey) Galatasaray İstanbul	22–25	25–22	25–18	25–15		97–80	Report

==== Second leg ====
Date	Time		Score		Set 1	Set 2	Set 3	Set 4	Set 5	Total	Report
5 Mar	20:30	Diatec Trentino (Italy)	3–1	(Greece) Olympiacos Piraeus	25–19	25–19	17–25	25–17		92–80	Report
5 Mar	19:00	Galatasaray İstanbul (Turkey)	3–1	(Russia) Kuzbass Kemerovo	18–25	25–19	25–21	25–17		93–82	Report
Golden set		Galatasaray İstanbul (Turkey)	15–10	(Russia) Kuzbass Kemerovo							

=== Finals ===
Team 1	Agg.	Team 2	1st leg	2nd leg
Diatec Trentino (Italy)	5–1	(Turkey) Galatasaray İstanbul	3–0	3–2

==== First leg ====
Date	Time		Score		Set 1	Set 2	Set 3	Set 4	Set 5	Total	Report
19 Mar	20:30	Diatec Trentino (Italy)	3–0	(Turkey) Galatasaray İstanbul	25–15	25–15	25–20			75–50	Report

==== Second leg ====
Date	Time		Score		Set 1	Set 2	Set 3	Set 4	Set 5	Total	Report
26 Mar	20:00	Galatasaray İstanbul (Turkey)	2–3	(Italy) Diatec Trentino	25–22	25–21	16–25	16–25	5–15	87–108	Report
