= 2022–23 CEV Cup =

51st edition of CEV Cup

- League: CEV Cup
- Sport: Volleyball
- Duration: 11 October 2022 – 5 April 2023
- Number of matches: 70
- Number of teams: 43
- Total attendance: 75,560
- Average attendance: 1,079

Finals
- Champions: (Italy) Valsa Group Modena
- Finals MVP: (Turkey) Adis Lagumdzija

CEV Cup seasons
- ← 2021–22 2023–24 →

The 2022–23 CEV Cup was the 51st edition of the second most important European volleyball club competition organised by the European Volleyball Confederation.

This year’s edition of the CEV Cup consisted of 43 teams, of which 30 teams qualified directly for the CEV Cup; 9 teams were the losers from the Champions League qualification phase; and the remaining 4 joined the rest in the quarterfinals, being transferred there from the Champions League group stage as the 3rd placed teams in their respective pools.

After losing the first leg of the final, Valsa Group Modena won the second leg and the golden set against Knack Roeselare to win the fourth title of the CEV Cup. Adis Lagumdzija was named MVP of the final match.

== Participating teams ==
The drawing of lots was held on 28 June 2022 in Luxembourg City.

Rank	Country	Number of teams	Teams
1	Turkey	3	Fenerbahçe, Arkas İzmir, Galatasaray
3	France	4	Chaumont VB 52, Narbonne Volley, Arago de Sète, Montpellier HSC VB
4	Italy	2	Valsa Group Modena, Bluenergy Daiko Volley Piacenza
5	Czech Republic	4	Lvi Praha, Jihostroj České Budějovice, Dukla Liberec, ČEZ Karlovarsko
7	Belgium	3	Greenyard Maaseik, Caruur Volley Gent, Knack Roeselare
8	Romania	3	CS Arcada Galați, Dinamo București, SCM Craiova
9	Switzerland	3	Lindaren Volley Amriswil, Chênois Genève, Volley Schönenwerd
10	Bulgaria	1	Neftochimic Burgas
11	Finland	2	Ford Levoranta Sastamala, Savo Volley
12	Austria	2	SK Zadruga Aich/Dob, Union Raiffeisen Waldviertel
13	Netherlands	2	Dynamo Apeldoorn, Lycurgus Groningen
14	Serbia	3	Crvena Zvezda Beograd, Partizan Beograd, Radnički Kragujevac
16	Hungary	1	Fino Kaposvár
18	Germany	2	SVG Lüneburg, WWK Volleys Herrsching
20	Croatia	2	Mladost Zagreb, Mursa Osijek
23	Bosnia and Herzegovina	1	Mladost Brčko
25	Montenegro	1	OK Budva
26	Slovenia	2	Calcit Kamnik, ACH Volley Ljubljana
27	Poland	1	PGE Skra Bełchatów
33	North Macedonia	1	Strumica Nikob

== Format ==
Qualification round (Home and away matches):

- 32nd Finals

Main phase (Home and away matches):

- 16th Finals → 8th Finals → Playoffs → 4th Finals

Final phase (Home and away matches):

- Semifinals → Finals

Aggregate score is counted as follows: 3 points for 3–0 or 3–1 win, 2 points for 3–2 win, 1 point for 2–3 loss.
In case the teams are tied after two legs, a Golden Set is played immediately at the completion of the second leg.

== Qualification round ==
=== 32nd Finals ===
Team 1	Agg.	Team 2	1st leg	2nd leg	Golden Set
Mladost Brčko (Bosnia and Herzegovina)	0–6	(Serbia) Crvena Zvezda Beograd	0–3	0–3	
OK Budva (Montenegro)	0–6	(Germany) SVG Lüneburg	0–3	1–3	
Strumica Nikob (North Macedonia)	1–5	(Croatia) Mursa Osijek	2–3	1–3	
SK Zadruga Aich/Dob (Austria)	1–5	(Slovenia) Calcit Kamnik	1–3	2–3	
Dynamo Apeldoorn (Netherlands)	0–6	(Poland) PGE Skra Bełchatów	0–3	0–3	
CS Arcada Galați (Romania)	4–2	(Serbia) Radnički Kragujevac	3–0	2–3	
Lindaren Volley Amriswil (Switzerland)	3–3 (Note: Order of legs reversed after original draw.)	(Germany) WWK Volleys Herrsching	2–3	3–2	15–11

==== First leg ====
Date	Time		Score		Set 1	Set 2	Set 3	Set 4	Set 5	Total	Report
11 Oct	19:00	Mladost Brčko (Bosnia and Herzegovina)	0–3	(Serbia) Crvena Zvezda Beograd	13–25	19–25	12–25			44–75	Report
12 Oct	18:00	OK Budva (Montenegro)	0–3	(Germany) SVG Lüneburg	14–25	19–25	10–25			43–75	Report
11 Oct	19:00	Strumica Nikob (North Macedonia)	2–3	(Croatia) Mursa Osijek	22–25	25–23	12–25	25–22	16–18	100–113	Report
19 Oct	19:00	SK Zadruga Aich/Dob (Austria)	1–3	(Slovenia) Calcit Kamnik	24–26	19–25	27–25	21–25		91–101	Report
19 Oct	19:30	Dynamo Apeldoorn (Netherlands)	0–3	(Poland) PGE Skra Bełchatów	16–25	13–25	19–25			48–75	Report
19 Oct	18:00	CS Arcada Galați (Romania)	3–0	(Serbia) Radnički Kragujevac	25–22	25–20	25–20			75–62	Report
19 Oct	20:00	WWK Volleys Herrsching (Germany)	2–3	(Switzerland) Lindaren Volley Amriswil	23–25	22–25	25–18	25–22	11–15	106–105	Report

==== Second leg ====
Date	Time		Score		Set 1	Set 2	Set 3	Set 4	Set 5	Total	Report
18 Oct	17:00	Crvena Zvezda Beograd (Serbia)	3–0	(Bosnia and Herzegovina) Mladost Brčko	25–6	25–14	25–12			75–32	Report
19 Oct	19:00	SVG Lüneburg (Germany)	3–1	(Montenegro) OK Budva	25–12	25–19	26–28	25–18		101–77	Report
19 Oct	19:00	Mursa Osijek (Croatia)	3–1	(North Macedonia) Strumica Nikob	21–25	25–17	25–19	25–15		96–76	Report
26 Oct	17:00	Calcit Kamnik (Slovenia)	3–2	(Austria) SK Zadruga Aich/Dob	25–20	25–23	18–25	21–25	15–11	104–104	Report
26 Oct	20:15	PGE Skra Bełchatów (Poland)	3–0	(Netherlands) Dynamo Apeldoorn	25–18	25–16	25–19			75–53	Report
26 Oct	18:00	Radnički Kragujevac (Serbia)	3–2	(Romania) CS Arcada Galați	25–23	18–25	25–18	18–25	18–16	104–107	Report
26 Oct	19:00	Lindaren Volley Amriswil (Switzerland)	2–3	(Germany) WWK Volleys Herrsching	22–25	23–25	25–23	27–25	6–15	103–113	Report
Golden set		Lindaren Volley Amriswil (Switzerland)	15–11	(Germany) WWK Volleys Herrsching							

== Main phase ==
=== 16th Finals ===
Team 1	Agg.	Team 2	1st leg	2nd leg	Golden Set
Calcit Kamnik (Slovenia)	3–3	(Netherlands) Lycurgus Groningen	3–0	0–3	13–15
SVG Lüneburg (Germany)	4–2	(Romania) Dinamo București	2–3	3–0	
Caruur Volley Gent (Belgium)	1–5	(Turkey) Arkas İzmir	2–3	1–3	
Ford Levoranta Sastamala (Finland)	0–6	(Italy) Valsa Group Modena	0–3	1–3	
Galatasaray (Turkey)	6–0	(Austria) Union Raiffeisen Waldviertel	3–0	3–0	
Dukla Liberec (Czech Republic)	0–6	(Switzerland) Chênois Genève	1–3	1–3	
Arago de Sète (France)	0–6	(France) Narbonne Volley	1–3	0–3	
PGE Skra Bełchatów (Poland)	5–1	(France) Chaumont VB 52	3–2	3–0	
Lindaren Volley Amriswil (Switzerland)	5–1	(Serbia) Partizan Beograd	3–2	3–1	
Mladost Zagreb (Croatia)	0–6	(Belgium) Greenyard Maaseik	0–3	0–3	
Volley Schönenwerd (Switzerland)	5–1	(Hungary) Fino Kaposvár	3–0	3–2	
Mursa Osijek (Croatia)	0–6	(Czech Republic) Jihostroj České Budějovice	0–3	0–3	
Crvena Zvezda Beograd (Serbia)	2–4	(Finland) Savo Volley	3–2	1–3	
CS Arcada Galați (Romania)	6–0	(Bulgaria) Neftochimic Burgas	3–1	3–0	
Piacenza (Italy)	6–0	(Czech Republic) Lvi Praha	3–0	3–1	
SCM Craiova (Romania)	3–3	(Turkey) Fenerbahçe	3–1	0–3	11–15

==== First leg ====
Date	Time		Score		Set 1	Set 2	Set 3	Set 4	Set 5	Total	Report
9 Nov	20:00	Calcit Kamnik (Slovenia)	3–0	(Netherlands) Lycurgus Groningen	25–15	25–19	25–17			75–51	Report
9 Nov	19:00	SVG Lüneburg (Germany)	2–3	(Romania) Dinamo București	25–22	25–23	19–25	21–25	9–15	99–110	Report
9 Nov	20:30	Caruur Volley Gent (Belgium)	2–3	(Turkey) Arkas İzmir	23–25	25–21	23–25	25–20	10–15	106–106	Report
10 Nov	18:30	Ford Levoranta Sastamala (Finland)	0–3	(Italy) Valsa Group Modena	18–25	22–25	21–25			61–75	Report
9 Nov	19:30	Galatasaray (Turkey)	3–0	(Austria) Union Raiffeisen Waldviertel	25–19	25–17	25–23			75–59	Report
8 Nov	18:00	Dukla Liberec (Czech Republic)	1–3	(Switzerland) Chênois Genève	26–24	20–25	22–25	23–25		91–99	Report
8 Nov	20:00	Arago de Sète (France)	1–3	(France) Narbonne Volley	13–25	25–19	20–25	17–25		75–94	Report
10 Nov	18:00	PGE Skra Bełchatów (Poland)	3–2	(France) Chaumont VB 52	25–23	25–23	22–25	23–25	15–10	110–106	Report
9 Nov	19:00	Lindaren Volley Amriswil (Switzerland)	3–2	(Serbia) Partizan Beograd	25–15	25–23	24–26	17–25	15–9	106–98	Report
9 Nov	16:30	Mladost Zagreb (Croatia)	0–3	(Belgium) Greenyard Maaseik	23–25	16–25	23–25			62–75	Report
9 Nov	19:30	Volley Schönenwerd (Switzerland)	3–0	(Hungary) Fino Kaposvár	25–17	25–20	25–21			75–58	Report
9 Nov	19:00	Mursa Osijek (Croatia)	0–3	(Czech Republic) Jihostroj České Budějovice	17–25	15–25	23–25			55–75	Report
8 Nov	16:30	Crvena Zvezda Beograd (Serbia)	3–2	(Finland) Savo Volley	25–18	29–27	24–26	23–25	15–10	116–106	Report
9 Nov	18:00	CS Arcada Galați (Romania)	3–1	(Bulgaria) Neftochimic Burgas	25–16	24–26	25–17	25–21		99–80	Report
9 Nov	20:30	Piacenza (Italy)	3–0	(Czech Republic) Lvi Praha	25–21	25–19	25–20			75–60	Report
9 Nov	18:00	SCM Craiova (Romania)	3–1	(Turkey) Fenerbahçe	18–25	27–25	25–22	25–23		95–95	Report

==== Second leg ====
Date	Time		Score		Set 1	Set 2	Set 3	Set 4	Set 5	Total	Report
16 Nov	20:00	Lycurgus Groningen (Netherlands)	3–0	(Slovenia) Calcit Kamnik	25–19	25–23	25–20			75–62	Report
Golden set		Lycurgus Groningen (Netherlands)	15–13	(Slovenia) Calcit Kamnik							
16 Nov	19:00	Dinamo București (Romania)	0–3	(Germany) SVG Lüneburg	23–25	23–25	20–25			66–75	Report
16 Nov	19:00	Arkas İzmir (Turkey)	3–1	(Belgium) Caruur Volley Gent	25–19	19–25	25–17	25–17		94–78	Report
16 Nov	20:30	Valsa Group Modena (Italy)	3–1	(Finland) Ford Levoranta Sastamala	21–25	25–20	25–20	25–18		96–83	Report
15 Nov	19:00	Union Raiffeisen Waldviertel (Austria)	0–3	(Turkey) Galatasaray	26–28	22–25	21–25			69–78	Report
16 Nov	20:00	Chênois Genève (Switzerland)	3–1	(Czech Republic) Dukla Liberec	25–18	25–18	13–25	25–18		88–79	Report
16 Nov	19:30	Narbonne Volley (France)	3–0	(France) Arago de Sète	25–15	25–18	25–23			75–56	Report
16 Nov	20:00	Chaumont VB 52 (France)	0–3	(Poland) PGE Skra Bełchatów	21–25	17–25	27–29			65–79	Report
16 Nov	18:00	Partizan Beograd (Serbia)	1–3	(Switzerland) Lindaren Volley Amriswil	21–25	23–25	26–24	21–25		91–99	Report
16 Nov	20:30	Greenyard Maaseik (Belgium)	3–0	(Croatia) Mladost Zagreb	25–22	25–22	26–24			76–68	Report
16 Nov	18:00	Fino Kaposvár (Hungary)	2–3	(Switzerland) Volley Schönenwerd	23–25	25–20	21–25	26–24	11–15	106–109	Report
15 Nov	17:00	Jihostroj České Budějovice (Czech Republic)	3–0	(Croatia) Mursa Osijek	25–19	25–17	25–14			75–50	Report
16 Nov	19:00	Savo Volley (Finland)	3–1	(Serbia) Crvena Zvezda Beograd	22–25	25–18	25–22	27–25		99–90	Report
16 Nov	18:00	Neftochimic Burgas (Bulgaria)	0–3	(Romania) CS Arcada Galați	18–25	19–25	22–25			59–75	Report
15 Nov	18:00	Lvi Praha (Czech Republic)	1–3	(Italy) Piacenza	19–25	26–28	25–23	21–25		91–101	Report
16 Nov	19:00	Fenerbahçe (Turkey)	3–0	(Romania) SCM Craiova	25–15	25–14	25–18			75–47	Report
Golden set		Fenerbahçe (Turkey)	15–11	(Romania) SCM Craiova							

=== 8th Finals ===
Team 1	Agg.	Team 2	1st leg	2nd leg
Lycurgus Groningen (Netherlands)	1–5	(Germany) SVG Lüneburg	2–3	0–3
Arkas İzmir (Turkey)	0–6	(Italy) Valsa Group Modena	0–3	0–3
Galatasaray (Turkey)	4–2	(Switzerland) Chênois Genève	2–3	3–0
Narbonne Volley (France)	1–5	(Poland) PGE Skra Bełchatów	0–3	2–3
Lindaren Volley Amriswil (Switzerland)	1–5	(Belgium) Greenyard Maaseik	2–3	0–3
Volley Schönenwerd (Switzerland)	1–5	(Czech Republic) Jihostroj České Budějovice	1–3	2–3
Savo Volley (Finland)	0–6	(Romania) CS Arcada Galați	1–3	1–3
Piacenza (Italy)	6–0	(Turkey) Fenerbahçe	3–1	3–1

==== First leg ====
Date	Time		Score		Set 1	Set 2	Set 3	Set 4	Set 5	Total	Report
1 Dec	20:00	Lycurgus Groningen (Netherlands)	2–3	(Germany) SVG Lüneburg	15–25	16–25	25–18	25–21	12–15	93–104	Report
30 Nov	19:00	Arkas İzmir (Turkey)	0–3	(Italy) Valsa Group Modena	20–25	25–27	18–25			63–77	Report
29 Nov	20:00	Galatasaray (Turkey)	2–3	(Switzerland) Chênois Genève	22–25	26–24	25–23	19–25	13–15	105–112	Report
29 Nov	19:30	Narbonne Volley (France)	0–3	(Poland) PGE Skra Bełchatów	19–25	20–25	22–25			61–75	Report
30 Nov	19:00	Lindaren Volley Amriswil (Switzerland)	2–3	(Belgium) Greenyard Maaseik	29–27	25–18	22–25	22–25	19–21	117–116	Report
30 Nov	19:30	Volley Schönenwerd (Switzerland)	1–3	(Czech Republic) Jihostroj České Budějovice	25–15	22–25	18–25	22–25		87–90	Report
30 Nov	18:30	Savo Volley (Finland)	1–3	(Romania) CS Arcada Galați	27–25	21–25	15–25	20–25		83–100	Report
30 Nov	20:30	Piacenza (Italy)	3–1	(Turkey) Fenerbahçe	25–13	24–26	25–15	25–20		99–74	Report

==== Second leg ====
Date	Time		Score		Set 1	Set 2	Set 3	Set 4	Set 5	Total	Report
14 Dec	19:00	SVG Lüneburg (Germany)	3–0	(Netherlands) Lycurgus Groningen	25–22	25–17	25–20			75–59	Report
14 Dec	20:30	Valsa Group Modena (Italy)	3–0	(Turkey) Arkas İzmir	25–19	25–16	25–15			75–50	Report
14 Dec	20:00	Chênois Genève (Switzerland)	0–3	(Turkey) Galatasaray	14–25	22–25	22–25			58–75	Report
14 Dec	16:00	PGE Skra Bełchatów (Poland)	3–2	(France) Narbonne Volley	25–19	22–25	22–25	25–20	15–11	109–100	Report
14 Dec	20:30	Greenyard Maaseik (Belgium)	3–0	(Switzerland) Lindaren Volley Amriswil	25–15	25–14	25–17			75–46	Report
13 Dec	18:00	Jihostroj České Budějovice (Czech Republic)	3–2	(Switzerland) Volley Schönenwerd	22–25	25–21	25–18	18–25	15–10	105–99	Report
14 Dec	18:00	CS Arcada Galați (Romania)	3–1	(Finland) Savo Volley	25–15	28–30	25–18	25–21		103–84	Report
14 Dec	16:00	Fenerbahçe (Turkey)	1–3	(Italy) Piacenza	25–22	23–25	24–26	19–25		91–98	Report

=== Playoffs ===
Team 1	Agg.	Team 2	1st leg	2nd leg	Golden Set
SVG Lüneburg (Germany)	2–4	(Italy) Valsa Group Modena	3–2	1–3	
Galatasaray (Turkey)	1–5	(Poland) PGE Skra Bełchatów	1–3	2–3	
Greenyard Maaseik (Belgium)	3–3	(Czech Republic) Jihostroj České Budějovice	3–1	0–3	15–9
CS Arcada Galați (Romania)	0–6	(Italy) Piacenza	0–3	1–3	

==== First leg ====
Date	Time		Score		Set 1	Set 2	Set 3	Set 4	Set 5	Total	Report
11 Jan	19:00	SVG Lüneburg (Germany)	3–2	(Italy) Valsa Group Modena	25–19	26–28	28–26	18–25	17–15	114–113	Report
10 Jan	20:00	Galatasaray (Turkey)	1–3	(Poland) PGE Skra Bełchatów	20–25	25–17	22–25	21–25		88–92	Report
11 Jan	20:30	Greenyard Maaseik (Belgium)	3–1	(Czech Republic) Jihostroj České Budějovice	25–22	20–25	25–17	25–22		95–86	Report
10 Jan	18:00	CS Arcada Galați (Romania)	0–3	(Italy) Piacenza	24–26	22–25	18–25			64–76	Report

==== Second leg ====
Date	Time		Score		Set 1	Set 2	Set 3	Set 4	Set 5	Total	Report
25 Jan	20:30	Valsa Group Modena (Italy)	3–1	(Germany) SVG Lüneburg	27–25	23–25	25–17	25–21		100–88	Report
26 Jan	20:30	PGE Skra Bełchatów (Poland)	3–2	(Turkey) Galatasaray	25–23	19–25	26–24	23–25	15–13	108–110	Report
25 Jan	18:00	Jihostroj České Budějovice (Czech Republic)	3–0	(Belgium) Greenyard Maaseik	27–25	25–21	25–16			77–62	Report
Golden set		Jihostroj České Budějovice (Czech Republic)	9–15	(Belgium) Greenyard Maaseik							
25 Jan	20:30	Piacenza (Italy)	3–1	(Romania) CS Arcada Galați	29–31	25–10	25–12	25–23		104–76	Report

=== 4th Finals ===
Team 1	Agg.	Team 2	1st leg	2nd leg	Golden Set
ACH Volley Ljubljana (Slovenia)	0–6	(Italy) Valsa Group Modena	1–3	0–3	
ČEZ Karlovarsko (Czech Republic)	2–4	(Poland) PGE Skra Bełchatów	3–2	0–3	
Knack Roeselare (Belgium)	3–3	(Belgium) Greenyard Maaseik	3–1	0–3	17–15
Montpellier HSC VB (France)	3–3	(Italy) Piacenza	3–1	0–3	7–15

==== First leg ====
Date	Time		Score		Set 1	Set 2	Set 3	Set 4	Set 5	Total	Report
8 Feb	18:00	ACH Volley Ljubljana (Slovenia)	1–3	(Italy) Valsa Group Modena	18–25	25–17	16–25	22–25		81–92	Report
8 Feb	18:00	ČEZ Karlovarsko (Czech Republic)	3–2	(Poland) PGE Skra Bełchatów	25–23	27–25	13–25	21–25	15–11	101–109	Report
8 Feb	20:30	Knack Roeselare (Belgium)	3–1	(Belgium) Greenyard Maaseik	25–23	20–25	25–23	25–23		95–94	Report
7 Feb	20:00	Montpellier HSC VB (France)	3–1	(Italy) Piacenza	23–25	25–23	25–22	25–20		98–90	Report

==== Second leg ====
Date	Time		Score		Set 1	Set 2	Set 3	Set 4	Set 5	Total	Report
15 Feb	20:30	Valsa Group Modena (Italy)	3–0	(Slovenia) ACH Volley Ljubljana	25–16	25–16	25–20			75–52	Report
16 Feb	20:30	PGE Skra Bełchatów (Poland)	3–0	(Czech Republic) ČEZ Karlovarsko	25–18	26–24	25–15			76–57	Report
15 Feb	20:30	Greenyard Maaseik (Belgium)	3–0	(Belgium) Knack Roeselare	25–23	28–26	28–26			81–75	Report
Golden set		Greenyard Maaseik (Belgium)	15–17	(Belgium) Knack Roeselare							
15 Feb	20:30	Piacenza (Italy)	3–0	(France) Montpellier HSC VB	25–21	25–19	25–21			75–61	Report
Golden set		Piacenza (Italy)	15–7	(France) Montpellier HSC VB							

== Final phase ==
=== Semifinals ===
Team 1	Agg.	Team 2	1st leg	2nd leg	Golden Set
Valsa Group Modena (Italy)	5–1	(Poland) PGE Skra Bełchatów	3–1	3–2	
Knack Roeselare (Belgium)	3–3	(Italy) Piacenza	3–0	0–3	15–12

==== First leg ====
Date	Time		Score		Set 1	Set 2	Set 3	Set 4	Set 5	Total	Report
8 Mar	20:30	Valsa Group Modena (Italy)	3–1	(Poland) PGE Skra Bełchatów	25–20	20–25	25–18	25–22		95–85	Report
7 Mar	20:15	Knack Roeselare (Belgium)	3–0	(Italy) Piacenza	25–20	25–23	25–23			75–66	Report

==== Second leg ====
Date	Time		Score		Set 1	Set 2	Set 3	Set 4	Set 5	Total	Report
15 Mar	20:30	PGE Skra Bełchatów (Poland)	2–3	(Italy) Valsa Group Modena	25–22	21–25	25–21	16–25	14–16	101–109	Report
15 Mar	20:30	Piacenza (Italy)	3–0	(Belgium) Knack Roeselare	25–17	25–19	25–21			75–57	Report
Golden set		Piacenza (Italy)	12–15	(Belgium) Knack Roeselare							

=== Finals ===
Team 1	Agg.	Team 2	1st leg	2nd leg	Golden Set
Valsa Group Modena (Italy)	3–3	(Belgium) Knack Roeselare	0–3	3–0	15–9

==== First leg ====
Date	Time		Score		Set 1	Set 2	Set 3	Set 4	Set 5	Total	Report
29 Mar	20:30	Valsa Group Modena (Italy)	0–3	(Belgium) Knack Roeselare	21–25	23–25	21–25			65–75	Report

==== Second leg ====
Date	Time		Score		Set 1	Set 2	Set 3	Set 4	Set 5	Total	Report
5 Apr	20:30	Knack Roeselare (Belgium)	0–3	(Italy) Valsa Group Modena	25–27	22–25	23–25			70–77	Report
Golden set		Knack Roeselare (Belgium)	9–15	(Italy) Valsa Group Modena							

== Final standings ==
Rank	Team
1st place, gold medalist(s)	(Italy) Valsa Group Modena
2nd place, silver medalist(s)	(Belgium) Knack Roeselare
Semifinalists	(Italy) Bluenergy Daiko Volley Piacenza (Poland) PGE Skra Bełchatów

2022–23 CEV Cup winners
(Italy)
Valsa Group Modena
4th title
