= 2021–22 CEV Cup =

- League: CEV Cup
- Sport: Volleyball
- Duration: 9 November 2021 – 23 March 2022

Finals
- Champions: (Italy) Vero Volley Monza
- Finals MVP: (Belarus) Uladzislau Davyskiba

CEV Cup seasons
- ← 2020–21 2022–23 →

The 2021–22 CEV Cup was the 50th edition of the second most important European volleyball club competition organised by the European Volleyball Confederation.

== Participating teams ==
The drawing of lots took place on 25 June 2021 in Luxembourg City.

Rank	Country	Number of teams	Teams
1	Turkey	3	Galatasaray HDI İstanbul, SK Ankara, Arkas İzmir
2	Russia	2	Kuzbass Kemerovo, Zenit Kazan
3	Italy	2	Vero Volley Monza, PerkinElmer Leo Shoes Modena
4	France	3	Chaumont VB 52, Montpellier HSC VB, Tours VB
5	Czech Republic	5	Dukla Liberec, Jihostroj České Budějovice, Lvi Praha, SKV Ústí Nad Labem, ČEZ Karlovarsko
6	Belgium	2	Decospan VT Menen, Volley Haasrode Leuven
7	Switzerland	3	TSV Jona, Chênois Genève, Lindaren Volley Amriswil
8	Romania	3	CSS CNE Lapi DEJ–SCM Zalău, Dinamo București, CSM Arcada Galați
10	Netherlands	3	Amysoft Lycurgus Groningen, Orion Doetinchem, Draisma Dynamo Apeldoorn
11	Austria	2	SK Zadruga Aich/Dob, UVC Holding Graz
12	Greece	2	Foinikas Syros Onex, Olympiacos Piraeus
13	Bulgaria	1	Neftochimic Burgas
14	Finland	1	Ford Levoranta Sastamala
15	Germany	3	United Volleys Frankfurt, SWD Powervolleys Düren, SVG Lüneburg
16	Belarus	1	Shakhtior Soligorsk
18	Bosnia and Herzegovina	1	Mladost Brčko
19	Poland	1	PGE Skra Bełchatów
20	Croatia	1	Mladost Zagreb
21	Montenegro	1	OK Budva
23	Estonia	1	Bigbank Tartu
25	Serbia	1	Ribnica Kraljevo
26	Slovenia	1	Calcit Kamnik
29	Spain	1	CDV Guaguas Las Palmas
32	Slovakia	1	Rieker UJS Komárno
36	England	1	IBB Polonia London

== Format ==
Qualification round (Home and away matches):

- 32nd Finals

Main phase (Home and away matches):

- 16th Finals → 8th Finals → 4th Finals

Final phase (Home and away matches):

- Semifinals → Finals

Aggregate score is counted as follows: 3 points for 3–0 or 3–1 win, 2 points for 3–2 win, 1 point for 2–3 loss.
In case the teams are tied after two legs, a Golden Set is played immediately at the completion of the second leg.

== Qualification round ==
=== 32nd Finals ===
Team 1	Agg.	Team 2	1st leg	2nd leg	Golden Set
OK Budva (Montenegro)	1–5	(Belgium) Volley Haasrode Leuven	2–3	1–3	
CDV Guaguas Las Palmas (Spain)	6–0	(Slovenia) Calcit Kamnik	3–0	3–1	
Rieker UJS Komárno (Slovakia)	0–6	(Turkey) Arkas İzmir	1–3	0–3	
Mladost Zagreb (Croatia)	6–0	(Czech Republic) SKV Ústí Nad Labem	3–0	3–1	
Bigbank Tartu (Estonia)	0–6	(Russia) Zenit Kazan	1–3	0–3	
IBB Polonia London (England)	1–5	(Netherlands) Orion Doetinchem	W.O.	2–3	
	Bye	(France) Montpellier HSC VB			
	Bye	(Czech Republic) Jihostroj České Budějovice			
Lindaren Volley Amriswil (Switzerland)	3–3	(Switzerland) Chênois Genève	3–1	0–3	10–15
Mladost Brčko (Bosnia and Herzegovina)	0–6	(Poland) PGE Skra Bełchatów	0–3	0–3	
UVC Holding Graz (Austria)	0–6	(Romania) Dinamo București	1–3	1–3	
CSM Arcada Galați (Romania)	4–2	(Czech Republic) Lvi Praha	3–1	2–3	
Draisma Dynamo Apeldoorn (Netherlands)	0–6	(France) Tours VB	1–3	0–3	
Ford Levoranta Sastamala (Finland)	0–6	(Italy) PerkinElmer Leo Shoes Modena	0–3	0–3	
SVG Lüneburg (Germany)	3–3	(Serbia) Ribnica Kraljevo	3–0	1–3	10–15
Shakhtior Soligorsk (Belarus)	0–6	(Germany) SWD Powervolleys Düren	0–3	0–3	

==== First leg ====
Date	Time		Score		Set 1	Set 2	Set 3	Set 4	Set 5	Total	Report
10 Nov	18:00	OK Budva (Montenegro)	2–3	(Belgium) Volley Haasrode Leuven	20–25	25–21	25–21	22–25	7–15	99–107	Report
10 Nov	19:30	CDV Guaguas Las Palmas (Spain)	3–0	(Slovenia) Calcit Kamnik	25–20	25–22	25–22			75–64	Report
10 Nov	20:15	Rieker UJS Komárno (Slovakia)	1–3	(Turkey) Arkas İzmir	25–23	20–25	13–25	10–25		68–98	Report
11 Nov	19:00	Mladost Zagreb (Croatia)	3–0	(Czech Republic) SKV Ústí Nad Labem	26–24	25–23	25–12			76–59	Report
9 Nov	19:00	Bigbank Tartu (Estonia)	1–3	(Russia) Zenit Kazan	21–25	18–25	25–20	23–25		87–95	Report
10 Nov	19:00	Lindaren Volley Amriswil (Switzerland)	3–1	(Switzerland) Chênois Genève	19–25	25–21	25–17	25–21		94–84	Report
16 Nov	18:00	Mladost Brčko (Bosnia and Herzegovina)	0–3	(Poland) PGE Skra Bełchatów	17–25	23–25	14–25			54–75	Report
10 Nov	19:00	UVC Holding Graz (Austria)	1–3	(Romania) Dinamo București	17–25	19–25	31–29	22–25		89–104	Report
10 Nov	18:00	CSM Arcada Galați (Romania)	3–1	(Czech Republic) Lvi Praha	25–19	25–17	22–25	25–21		97–82	Report
10 Nov	19:30	Draisma Dynamo Apeldoorn (Netherlands)	1–3	(France) Tours VB	22–25	17–25	25–19	16–25		80–94	Report
10 Nov	18:30	Ford Levoranta Sastamala (Finland)	0–3	(Italy) PerkinElmer Leo Shoes Modena	18–25	19–25	23–25			60–75	Report
10 Nov	19:00	SVG Lüneburg (Germany)	3–0	(Serbia) Ribnica Kraljevo	25–20	25–21	25–22			75–63	Report
9 Nov	19:00	Shakhtior Soligorsk (Belarus)	0–3	(Germany) SWD Powervolleys Düren	20–25	22–25	21–25			63–75	Report

==== Second leg ====
Date	Time		Score		Set 1	Set 2	Set 3	Set 4	Set 5	Total	Report
17 Nov	20:30	Volley Haasrode Leuven (Belgium)	3–1	(Montenegro) OK Budva	25–8	17–25	25–22	25–19		92–74	Report
17 Nov	20:00	Calcit Kamnik (Slovenia)	1–3	(Spain) CDV Guaguas Las Palmas	24–26	25–19	21–25	21–25		91–95	Report
17 Nov	19:00	Arkas İzmir (Turkey)	3–0	(Slovakia) Rieker UJS Komárno	25–20	25–16	25–20			75–56	Report
17 Nov	18:00	SKV Ústí Nad Labem (Czech Republic)	1–3	(Croatia) Mladost Zagreb	25–21	21–25	23–25	21–25		90–96	Report
10 Nov	19:00	Zenit Kazan (Russia)	3–0	(Estonia) Bigbank Tartu	25–21	25–17	25–19			75–57	Report
17 Nov	20:00	Orion Doetinchem (Netherlands)	3–2	(England) IBB Polonia London	21–25	25–19	25–22	21–25	15–12	107–103	Report
17 Nov	19:00	Chênois Genève (Switzerland)	3–0	(Switzerland) Lindaren Volley Amriswil	25–23	25–23	25–18			75–64	Report
Golden set		Chênois Genève (Switzerland)	15–10	(Switzerland) Lindaren Volley Amriswil							
18 Nov	18:00	PGE Skra Bełchatów (Poland)	3–0	(Bosnia and Herzegovina) Mladost Brčko	25–20	25–8	25–14			75–42	Report
17 Nov	19:00	Dinamo București (Romania)	3–1	(Austria) UVC Holding Graz	20–25	25–12	25–23	25–21		95–81	Report
17 Nov	19:00	Lvi Praha (Czech Republic)	3–2	(Romania) CSM Arcada Galați	23–25	25–18	17–25	25–19	15–12	105–99	Report
17 Nov	20:00	Tours VB (France)	3–0	(Netherlands) Draisma Dynamo Apeldoorn	25–14	25–14	25–17			75–45	Report
17 Nov	20:30	PerkinElmer Leo Shoes Modena (Italy)	3–0	(Finland) Ford Levoranta Sastamala	25–21	25–14	25–14			75–49	Report
17 Nov	19:00	Ribnica Kraljevo (Serbia)	3–1	(Germany) SVG Lüneburg	25–18	25–22	21–25	25–18		96–83	Report
Golden set		Ribnica Kraljevo (Serbia)	15–10	(Germany) SVG Lüneburg							
10 Nov	19:00	SWD Powervolleys Düren (Germany)	3–0	(Belarus) Shakhtior Soligorsk	25–16	25–21	25–23			75–60	Report

== Main phase ==
=== 16th Finals ===
Team 1	Agg.	Team 2	1st leg	2nd leg	Golden Set
Volley Haasrode Leuven (Belgium)	3–3	(Greece) Foinikas Syros Onex	3–0	1–3	15–13
CDV Guaguas Las Palmas (Spain)	6–0	(Belgium) Decospan VT Menen	3–1	3–0	
Arkas İzmir (Turkey)	2–4	(Turkey) SK Ankara	3–2	1–3	
Mladost Zagreb (Croatia)	0–6	(Italy) Vero Volley Monza	1–3	1–3	
Zenit Kazan (Russia)	6–0	(Austria) SK Zadruga Aich/Dob	3–0	3–0	
Orion Doetinchem (Netherlands)	6–0	(Switzerland) TSV Jona	3–0	3–1	
Montpellier HSC VB (France)	5–1	(Greece) Olympiacos Piraeus	3–0	3–2	
Jihostroj České Budějovice (Czech Republic)	1–5	(Russia) Kuzbass Kemerovo	2–3	1–3	
Chênois Genève (Switzerland)	1–5	(Bulgaria) Neftochimic Burgas	2–3	1–3	
PGE Skra Bełchatów (Poland)	6–0	(Czech Republic) Dukla Liberec	3–0	3–1	
Dinamo București (Romania)	2–4	(Germany) United Volleys Frankfurt	2–3	2–3	
CSM Arcada Galați (Romania)	4–2	(France) Chaumont VB 52	3–0	2–3	
Tours VB (France)	6–0	(Netherlands) Amysoft Lycurgus Groningen	3–1	3–0	
PerkinElmer Leo Shoes Modena (Italy)	6–0	(Romania) CSS CNE Lapi DEJ–SCM Zalău	3–1	3–0	
Ribnica Kraljevo (Serbia)	0–6	(Czech Republic) ČEZ Karlovarsko	1–3	1–3	
SWD Powervolleys Düren (Germany)	1–5	(Turkey) Galatasaray HDI İstanbul	2–3	0–3	

==== First leg ====
Date	Time		Score		Set 1	Set 2	Set 3	Set 4	Set 5	Total	Report
1 Dec	20:30	Volley Haasrode Leuven (Belgium)	3–0	(Greece) Foinikas Syros Onex	25–21	28–26	25–19			78–66	Report
1 Dec	19:30	CDV Guaguas Las Palmas (Spain)	3–1	(Belgium) Decospan VT Menen	19–25	25–17	25–16	25–15		94–73	Report
1 Dec	19:00	Arkas İzmir (Turkey)	3–2	(Turkey) SK Ankara	25–21	25–22	21–25	17–25	15–7	103–100	Report
1 Dec	19:30	Mladost Zagreb (Croatia)	1–3	(Italy) Vero Volley Monza	16–25	25–18	24–26	22–25		87–94	Report
9 Dec	19:00	Zenit Kazan (Russia)	3–0	(Austria) SK Zadruga Aich/Dob	25–17	25–23	25–12			75–52	Report
2 Dec	20:00	Orion Doetinchem (Netherlands)	3–0	(Switzerland) TSV Jona	25–16	25–18	25–20			75–54	Report
1 Dec	20:00	Montpellier HSC VB (France)	3–0	(Greece) Olympiacos Piraeus	25–20	25–22	25–14			75–56	Report
1 Dec	17:00	Jihostroj České Budějovice (Czech Republic)	2–3	(Russia) Kuzbass Kemerovo	23–25	25–19	25–21	22–25	20–22	115–112	Report
30 Nov	20:00	Chênois Genève (Switzerland)	2–3	(Bulgaria) Neftochimic Burgas	23–25	25–18	19–25	25–19	14–16	106–103	Report
1 Dec	18:00	PGE Skra Bełchatów (Poland)	3–0	(Czech Republic) Dukla Liberec	25–15	25–20	25–21			75–56	Report
1 Dec	17:00	Dinamo București (Romania)	2–3	(Germany) United Volleys Frankfurt	26–28	25–19	21–25	25–21	11–15	108–108	Report
1 Dec	19:00	CSM Arcada Galați (Romania)	3–0	(France) Chaumont VB 52	25–18	25–23	31–29			81–70	Report
1 Dec	20:00	Tours VB (France)	3–1	(Netherlands) Amysoft Lycurgus Groningen	25–15	19–25	25–17	25–15		94–72	Report
30 Nov	20:30	Modena (Italy)	3–1	(Romania) CSS CNE Lapi DEJ–SCM Zalău	25–15	25–17	20–25	25–21		95–78	Report
1 Dec	19:00	Ribnica Kraljevo (Serbia)	1–3	(Czech Republic) ČEZ Karlovarsko	19–25	25–20	16–25	18–25		78–95	Report
7 Dec	21:00	SWD Powervolleys Düren (Germany)	2–3	(Turkey) Galatasaray HDI İstanbul	19–25	26–24	25–23	23–25	14–16	107–113	Report

==== Second leg ====
Date	Time		Score		Set 1	Set 2	Set 3	Set 4	Set 5	Total	Report
8 Dec	18:00	Foinikas Syros Onex (Greece)	3–1	(Belgium) Volley Haasrode Leuven	21–25	25–17	25–15	25–17		96–74	Report
Golden set		Foinikas Syros Onex (Greece)	13–15	(Belgium) Volley Haasrode Leuven							
8 Dec	20:00	Decospan VT Menen (Belgium)	0–3	(Spain) CDV Guaguas Las Palmas	22–25	20–25	19–25			61–75	Report
8 Dec	17:00	SK Ankara (Turkey)	3–1	(Turkey) Arkas İzmir	25–19	25–20	23–25	25–20		98–84	Report
9 Dec	19:00	Vero Volley Monza (Italy)	3–1	(Croatia) Mladost Zagreb	23–25	25–14	25–15	25–20		98–74	Report
8 Dec	19:00	SK Zadruga Aich/Dob (Austria)	0–3	(Russia) Zenit Kazan	12–25	18–25	19–25			49–75	Report
16 Dec	20:00	TSV Jona (Switzerland)	1–3	(Netherlands) Orion Doetinchem	23–25	18–25	25–23	11–25		77–98	Report
7 Dec	20:00	Olympiacos Piraeus (Greece)	2–3	(France) Montpellier HSC VB	19–25	20–25	25–23	26–24	15–17	105–114	Report
9 Dec	19:00	Kuzbass Kemerovo (Russia)	3–1	(Czech Republic) Jihostroj České Budějovice	25–21	19–25	25–14	25–21		94–81	Report
7 Dec	18:00	Neftochimic Burgas (Bulgaria)	3–1	(Switzerland) Chênois Genève	17–25	29–27	25–21	25–20		96–93	Report
9 Dec	18:00	Dukla Liberec (Czech Republic)	1–3	(Poland) PGE Skra Bełchatów	20–25	17–25	25–23	23–25		85–98	Report
8 Dec	19:00	United Volleys Frankfurt (Germany)	3–2	(Romania) Dinamo București	23–25	25–13	24–26	25–23	15–9	112–96	Report
8 Dec	20:00	Chaumont VB 52 (France)	3–2	(Romania) CSM Arcada Galați	25–20	22–25	20–25	25–23	17–15	109–108	Report
8 Dec	20:00	Amysoft Lycurgus Groningen (Netherlands)	0–3	(France) Tours VB	11–25	21–25	22–25			54–75	Report
1 Dec	18:00	CSS CNE Lapi DEJ–SCM Zalău (Romania)	0–3	(Italy) Modena	13–25	14–25	15–25			42–75	Report
8 Dec	18:00	ČEZ Karlovarsko (Czech Republic)	3–1	(Serbia) Ribnica Kraljevo	20–25	28–26	25–18	25–17		98–86	Report
8 Dec	21:00	Galatasaray HDI İstanbul (Turkey)	3–0	(Germany) SWD Powervolleys Düren	25–17	25–19	25–23			75–59	Report

=== 8th Finals ===
Team 1	Agg.	Team 2	1st leg	2nd leg
Volley Haasrode Leuven (Belgium)	0–6	(Spain) CDV Guaguas Las Palmas	0–3	0–3
SK Ankara (Turkey)	0–6	(Italy) Vero Volley Monza	0–3	0–3
Zenit Kazan (Russia)	6–0	(Netherlands) Orion Doetinchem	3–0	3–0
Montpellier HSC VB (France)	0–6	(Russia) Kuzbass Kemerovo	W.O.	W.O.
Neftochimic Burgas (Bulgaria)	1–5	(Poland) PGE Skra Bełchatów	2–3	1–3
United Volleys Frankfurt (Germany)	1–5	(Romania) CSM Arcada Galați	0–3	2–3
Tours VB (France)	4–2	(Italy) PerkinElmer Leo Shoes Modena	3–1	2–3
ČEZ Karlovarsko (Czech Republic)	6–0	(Turkey) Galatasaray HDI İstanbul	3–0	3–1

==== First leg ====
Date	Time		Score		Set 1	Set 2	Set 3	Set 4	Set 5	Total	Report
12 Jan	20:30	Volley Haasrode Leuven (Belgium)	0–3	(Spain) CDV Guaguas Las Palmas	16–25	22–25	21–25			59–75	Report
12 Jan	19:00	SK Ankara (Turkey)	0–3	(Italy) Vero Volley Monza	12–25	16–25	18–25			46–75	Report
12 Jan	19:00	Zenit Kazan (Russia)	3–0	(Netherlands) Orion Doetinchem	25–12	25–19	25–14			75–45	Report
11 Jan	19:00	Neftochimic Burgas (Bulgaria)	2–3	(Poland) PGE Skra Bełchatów	22–25	26–24	24–26	25–21	12–15	109–111	Report
18 Jan	18:00	United Volleys Frankfurt (Germany)	0–3	(Romania) CSM Arcada Galați	24–26	13–25	17–25			54–76	Report
12 Jan	20:00	Tours VB (France)	3–1	(Italy) PerkinElmer Leo Shoes Modena	22–25	25–23	27–25	25–19		99–92	Report
12 Jan	18:00	ČEZ Karlovarsko (Czech Republic)	3–0	(Turkey) Galatasaray HDI İstanbul	25–23	25–18	25–16			75–57	Report

==== Second leg ====
Date	Time		Score		Set 1	Set 2	Set 3	Set 4	Set 5	Total	Report
26 Jan	19:30	CDV Guaguas Las Palmas (Spain)	3–0	(Belgium) Volley Haasrode Leuven	27–25	25–21	25–20			77–66	Report
19 Jan	19:00	Vero Volley Monza (Italy)	3–0	(Turkey) SK Ankara	25–18	25–18	25–20			75–56	Report
20 Jan	20:00	Orion Doetinchem (Netherlands)	0–3	(Russia) Zenit Kazan	17–25	12–25	17–25			46–75	Report
18 Jan	18:00	PGE Skra Bełchatów (Poland)	3–1	(Bulgaria) Neftochimic Burgas	25–10	24–26	25–15	25–14		99–65	Report
20 Jan	18:00	CSM Arcada Galați (Romania)	3–2	(Germany) United Volleys Frankfurt	25–20	27–29	25–27	27–25	15–11	119–112	Report
19 Jan	20:30	PerkinElmer Leo Shoes Modena (Italy)	3–2	(France) Tours VB	25–17	24–26	33–35	25–19	15–13	122–110	Report
20 Jan	19:00	Galatasaray HDI İstanbul (Turkey)	1–3	(Czech Republic) ČEZ Karlovarsko	25–17	17–25	18–25	22–25		82–92	Report

=== 4th Finals ===
Team 1	Agg.	Team 2	1st leg	2nd leg
CDV Guaguas Las Palmas (Spain)	0–6	(Italy) Vero Volley Monza	0–3	1–3
Zenit Kazan (Russia)	6–0	(Russia) Kuzbass Kemerovo	3–0	3–1
PGE Skra Bełchatów (Poland)	5–1	(Romania) CSM Arcada Galați	3–2	3–1
Tours VB (France)	6–0	(Czech Republic) ČEZ Karlovarsko	3–0	3–1

==== First leg ====
Date	Time		Score		Set 1	Set 2	Set 3	Set 4	Set 5	Total	Report
2 Feb	19:30	CDV Guaguas Las Palmas (Spain)	0–3	(Italy) Vero Volley Monza	15–25	23–25	23–25			61–75	Report
9 Feb	19:00	Zenit Kazan (Russia)	3–0	(Russia) Kuzbass Kemerovo	26–24	25–17	25–17			76–58	Report
1 Feb	18:00	PGE Skra Bełchatów (Poland)	3–2	(Romania) CSM Arcada Galați	25–21	26–24	19–25	21–25	15–13	106–108	Report
2 Feb	20:00	Tours VB (France)	3–0	(Czech Republic) ČEZ Karlovarsko	25–22	27–25	25–22			77–69	Report

==== Second leg ====
Date	Time		Score		Set 1	Set 2	Set 3	Set 4	Set 5	Total	Report
9 Feb	19:00	Vero Volley Monza (Italy)	3–1	(Spain) CDV Guaguas Las Palmas	25–17	25–12	24–26	25–19		99–74	Report
10 Feb	19:00	Kuzbass Kemerovo (Russia)	1–3	(Russia) Zenit Kazan	18–25	13–25	25–22	14–25		70–97	Report
8 Feb	18:00	CSM Arcada Galați (Romania)	1–3	(Poland) PGE Skra Bełchatów	21–25	25–19	19–25	23–25		88–94	Report
10 Feb	17:00	ČEZ Karlovarsko (Czech Republic)	1–3	(France) Tours VB	28–30	23–25	25–21	26–28		102–104	Report

== Final phase ==
=== Semifinals ===
Team 1	Agg.	Team 2	1st leg	2nd leg
Vero Volley Monza (Italy)	(Note: Zenit Kazan was excluded from further competition due to the Russian invasion of Ukraine. The Italian team of Vero Volley Monza advanced to the finals.)	(Russia) Zenit Kazan	1–3	W.O.
PGE Skra Bełchatów (Poland)	2–4	(France) Tours VB	3–2	1–3

==== First leg ====
Date	Time		Score		Set 1	Set 2	Set 3	Set 4	Set 5	Total	Report
24 Feb	19:00	Vero Volley Monza (Italy)	1–3	(Russia) Zenit Kazan	14–25	20–25	25–19	19–25		78–94	Report
24 Feb	18:00	PGE Skra Bełchatów (Poland)	3–2	(France) Tours VB	24–26	25–22	25–20	22–25	15–13	111–106	Report

==== Second leg ====
Date	Time		Score		Set 1	Set 2	Set 3	Set 4	Set 5	Total	Report
2 Mar	20:00	Tours VB (France)	3–1	(Poland) PGE Skra Bełchatów	25–21	25–20	21–25	25–20		96–86	Report

=== Finals ===
Team 1	Agg.	Team 2	1st leg	2nd leg
Vero Volley Monza (Italy)	6–0	(France) Tours VB	3–0	3–0

==== First leg ====
Date	Time		Score		Set 1	Set 2	Set 3	Set 4	Set 5	Total	Report
16 Mar	20:00	Vero Volley Monza (Italy)	3–0	(France) Tours VB	25–19	25–19	25–22			75–60	Report

==== Second leg ====
Date	Time		Score		Set 1	Set 2	Set 3	Set 4	Set 5	Total	Report
23 Mar	20:00	Tours VB (France)	0–3	(Italy) Vero Volley Monza	24–26	18–25	18–25			60–76	Report

== Final standings ==
Rank	Team
1st place, gold medalist(s)	(Italy) Vero Volley Monza
2nd place, silver medalist(s)	(France) Tours VB
Semifinalists	(Poland) PGE Skra Bełchatów (Russia) Zenit Kazan

2021–22 CEV Cup winners
(Italy)
Vero Volley Monza
1st title
