= 2019–20 CEV Cup =

- League: CEV Cup
- Sport: Volleyball
- Duration: 10 December 2019 – 19 March 2020

Finals

CEV Cup seasons
- ← 2018–19 2020–21 →

The 2019–20 CEV Cup was the 48th edition of the European CEV Cup volleyball club tournament. The tournament has been cancelled due to the COVID-19 pandemic.

== Participating teams ==
The number of participants on the basis of ranking list for European Cup Competitions:

Rank	Country	Number of teams	Teams
1	Russia	2	Lokomotiv Novosibirsk, Zenit Saint Petersburg
2	Italy	1	Leo Shoes Modena
3	Turkey	2	Arkas Izmir, Galatasaray HDI Istanbul
4	France	2	Chaumont VB 52, GFC Ajaccio
5	Belgium	1	Lindemans Aalst
6	Czech Republic	2	Dukla Liberec, VK Ostrava
7	Switzerland	2	Lindaren Volley Amriswil, Lausanne UC
8	Greece	2	Olympiacos Piraeus, PAOK Thessaloniki
9	Romania	2	CS Arcada Galați, Dinamo București
10	Germany	2	Hypo Tirol Alpenvolleys Haching, United Volleys Frankfurt
11	Austria	1	SK Zadruga Aich
12	Netherlands	2	Active Living Orion Doetinchem, Draisma Dynamo Apeldoorn
14	Finland	2	Savo Volley Kuopio, Ford Store Levoranta Sastamala
15	Belarus	1	Shakhtior Soligorsk
18	Ukraine	1	Barkom-Kazhany
20	Croatia	1	Mladost Zagreb
21	Bulgaria	1	Neftohimic 2010 Burgas
25	Bosnia and Herzegovina	2	Mladost Brčko, OK Kakanj 78 Kakanj
30	Montenegro	1	Budvanska Rivijera
36	England	1	IBB Polonia London

== Main phase ==
=== 16th finals ===
Team 1	Agg.	Team 2	1st leg	2nd leg	Golden Set
Neftohimic 2010 Burgas (Bulgaria)	0–6	(Russia) Zenit Saint Petersburg	0–3	0–3	
OK Kakanj 78 Kakanj (Bosnia and Herzegovina)	0–6	(Montenegro) Budvanska Rivijera	1–3	0–3	
Hypo Tirol Alpenvolleys Haching (Germany)	5–1	(Finland) Ford Store Levoranta Sastamala	3–0	3–2	
Barkom-Kazhany (Ukraine)	3–3	(Greece) PAOK Thessaloniki	1–3	3–0	16–14
Active Living Orion Doetinchem (Netherlands)	0–6	(Belgium) Lindemans Aalst	0–3	0–3	
	Bye	(Croatia) Mladost Zagreb			
Draisma Dynamo Apeldoorn (Netherlands)	6–0	(England) IBB Polonia London	3–0	3–0	
Lokomotiv Novosibirsk (Russia)	3–3	(France) Chaumont VB 52	3–0	0–3	15–12
Dinamo București (Romania)	0–6	(Turkey) Arkas Izmir	0–3	1–3	
United Volleys Frankfurt (Germany)	4–2	(Belarus) Shakhtior Soligorsk	2–3	3–1	
Savo Volley Kuopio (Finland)	0–6	(Romania) CS Arcada Galați	0–3	0–3	
Galatasaray HDI Istanbul (Turkey)	3–3	(Czech Republic) Dukla Liberec	3–1	0–3	15–11
GFC Ajaccio (France)	5–1	(Switzerland) Lindaren Volley Amriswil	3–0	3–2	
Lausanne UC (Switzerland)	3–3	(Bosnia and Herzegovina) Mladost Brčko	1–3	3–0	13–15
VK Ostrava (Czech Republic)	4–2	(Austria) SK Zadruga Aich	2–3	3–0	
Olympiacos Piraeus (Greece)	1–5	(Italy) Leo Shoes Modena	2–3	0–3	

==== First leg ====
Date	Time		Score		Set 1	Set 2	Set 3	Set 4	Set 5	Total	Report
11 Dec	19:00	Neftohimic 2010 Burgas (Bulgaria)	0–3	(Russia) Zenit Saint Petersburg	22–25	20–25	22–25			64–75	Report
10 Dec	19:00	OK Kakanj 78 Kakanj (Bosnia and Herzegovina)	1–3	(Montenegro) Budvanska Rivijera	16–25	25–21	22–25	12–25		75–96	Report
11 Dec	19:00	Hypo Tirol Alpenvolleys Haching (Germany)	3–0	(Finland) Ford Store Levoranta Sastamala	25–20	26–24	25–22			76–66	Report
11 Dec	19:00	Barkom-Kazhany (Ukraine)	1–3	(Greece) PAOK Thessaloniki	16–25	21–25	25–22	19–25		81–97	Report
11 Dec	20:00	Active Living Orion Doetinchem (Netherlands)	0–3	(Belgium) Lindemans Aalst	23–25	20–25	20–25			63–75	Report
11 Dec	20:00	Draisma Dynamo Apeldoorn (Netherlands)	3–0	(England) IBB Polonia London	25–14	25–17	25–20			75–51	Report
11 Dec	19:00	Lokomotiv Novosibirsk (Russia)	3–0	(France) Chaumont VB 52	25–22	25–13	25–20			75–55	Report
11 Dec	17:00	Dinamo București (Romania)	0–3	(Turkey) Arkas Izmir	21–25	18–25	16–25			55–75	Report
11 Dec	19:30	United Volleys Frankfurt (Germany)	2–3	(Belarus) Shakhtior Soligorsk	25–20	22–25	25–17	17–25	15–17	104–104	Report
11 Dec	19:00	Savo Volley Kuopio (Finland)	0–3	(Romania) CS Arcada Galați	19–25	23–25	22–25			64–75	Report
11 Dec	19:00	Galatasaray HDI Istanbul (Turkey)	3–1	(Czech Republic) Dukla Liberec	25–20	20–25	25–17	25–19		95–81	Report
10 Dec	20:00	GFC Ajaccio (France)	3–0	(Switzerland) Lindaren Volley Amriswil	25–20	25–14	25–21			75–55	Report
11 Dec	19:30	Lausanne UC (Switzerland)	1–3	(Bosnia and Herzegovina) Mladost Brčko	23–25	25–23	18–25	20–25		86–98	Report
10 Dec	18:00	VK Ostrava (Czech Republic)	2–3	(Austria) SK Zadruga Aich	23–25	25–17	22–25	27–25	7–15	104–107	Report
12 Dec	18:00	Olympiacos Piraeus (Greece)	2–3	(Italy) Leo Shoes Modena	34–32	17–25	38–36	19–25	15–17	123–135	Report

==== Second leg ====
Date	Time		Score		Set 1	Set 2	Set 3	Set 4	Set 5	Total	Report
18 Dec	19:30	Zenit Saint Petersburg (Russia)	3–0	(Bulgaria) Neftohimic 2010 Burgas	25–21	25–22	25–19			75–62	Report
17 Dec	18:00	Budvanska Rivijera (Montenegro)	3–0	(Bosnia and Herzegovina) OK Kakanj 78 Kakanj	25–13	25–18	25–10			75–41	Report
17 Dec	18:30	Ford Store Levoranta Sastamala (Finland)	2–3	(Germany) Hypo Tirol Alpenvolleys Haching	20–25	25–23	17–25	25–23	8–15	95–111	Report
19 Dec	19:00	PAOK Thessaloniki (Greece)	0–3	(Ukraine) Barkom-Kazhany	22–25	21–25	23–25			66–75	Report
Golden set		PAOK Thessaloniki (Greece)	14–16	(Ukraine) Barkom-Kazhany							
18 Dec	20:30	Lindemans Aalst (Belgium)	3–0	(Netherlands) Active Living Orion Doetinchem	26–24	25–13	25–20			76–57	Report
19 Dec	19:00	IBB Polonia London (England)	0–3	(Netherlands) Draisma Dynamo Apeldoorn	14–25	20–25	20–25			54–75	Report
18 Dec	20:00	Chaumont VB 52 (France)	3–0	(Russia) Lokomotiv Novosibirsk	25–16	25–19	25–20			75–55	Report
Golden set		Chaumont VB 52 (France)	12–15	(Russia) Lokomotiv Novosibirsk							
19 Dec	19:00	Arkas Izmir (Turkey)	3–1	(Romania) Dinamo București	28–30	25–15	25–23	27–25		105–93	Report
17 Dec	19:00	Shakhtior Soligorsk (Belarus)	1–3	(Germany) United Volleys Frankfurt	20–25	21–25	25–21	21–25		87–96	Report
17 Dec	18:00	CS Arcada Galați (Romania)	3–0	(Finland) Savo Volley Kuopio	25–20	25–15	25–18			75–53	Report
19 Dec	18:00	Dukla Liberec (Czech Republic)	3–0	(Turkey) Galatasaray HDI Istanbul	27–25	25–19	25–16			77–60	Report
Golden set		Dukla Liberec (Czech Republic)	11–15	(Turkey) Galatasaray HDI Istanbul							
18 Dec	19:00	Lindaren Volley Amriswil (Switzerland)	2–3	(France) GFC Ajaccio	23–25	25–21	17–25	25–18	8–15	98–104	Report
17 Dec	19:00	Mladost Brčko (Bosnia and Herzegovina)	0–3	(Switzerland) Lausanne UC	21–25	23–25	16–25			60–75	Report
Golden set		Mladost Brčko (Bosnia and Herzegovina)	15–13	(Switzerland) Lausanne UC							
18 Dec	19:00	SK Zadruga Aich (Austria)	0–3	(Czech Republic) VK Ostrava	23–25	25–27	19–25			67–77	Report
19 Dec	20:30	Leo Shoes Modena (Italy)	3–0	(Greece) Olympiacos Piraeus	25–18	25–22	25–22			75–62	Report

=== 8th finals ===
Team 1	Agg.	Team 2	1st leg	2nd leg	Golden Set
Budvanska Rivijera (Montenegro)	0–6	(Russia) Zenit Saint Petersburg	0–3	0–3	
Barkom-Kazhany (Ukraine)	1–5	(Germany) Hypo Tirol Alpenvolleys Haching	0–3	2–3	
Mladost Zagreb (Croatia)	1–5	(Belgium) Lindemans Aalst	2–3	1–3	
Lokomotiv Novosibirsk (Russia)	6–0 (Note: Order of legs reversed after original draw.)	(Netherlands) Draisma Dynamo Apeldoorn	3–0	3–1	
United Volleys Frankfurt (Germany)	1–5	(Turkey) Arkas Izmir	2–3	0–3	
Galatasaray HDI Istanbul (Turkey)	4–2	(Romania) CS Arcada Galați	3–0	2–3	
GFC Ajaccio (France)	4–2	(Bosnia and Herzegovina) Mladost Brčko	3–1	2–3	
Leo Shoes Modena (Italy)	6–0	(Czech Republic) VK Ostrava	3–0	3–1	

==== First leg ====
Date	Time		Score		Set 1	Set 2	Set 3	Set 4	Set 5	Total	Report
30 Jan	18:00	Budvanska Rivijera (Montenegro)	0–3	(Russia) Zenit Saint Petersburg	13–25	14–25	13–25			40–75	Report
29 Jan	19:00	Barkom-Kazhany (Ukraine)	0–3	(Germany) Hypo Tirol Alpenvolleys Haching	25–27	20–25	18–25			63–77	Report
29 Jan	20:00	Mladost Zagreb (Croatia)	2–3	(Belgium) Lindemans Aalst	25–23	19–25	25–19	19–25	13–15	101–107	Report
28 Jan	19:00	Lokomotiv Novosibirsk (Russia)	3–0	(Netherlands) Draisma Dynamo Apeldoorn	25–23	27–25	25–18			77–66	Report
29 Jan	19:30	United Volleys Frankfurt (Germany)	2–3	(Turkey) Arkas Izmir	25–21	25–16	18–25	20–25	12–15	100–102	Report
29 Jan	19:00	Galatasaray HDI Istanbul (Turkey)	3–0	(Romania) CS Arcada Galați	26–24	25–21	25–20			76–65	Report
28 Jan	20:00	GFC Ajaccio (France)	3–1	(Bosnia and Herzegovina) Mladost Brčko	22–25	25–22	25–22	25–20		97–89	Report
29 Jan	20:30	Leo Shoes Modena (Italy)	3–0	(Czech Republic) VK Ostrava	25–13	25–17	25–16			75–46	Report

==== Second leg ====
Date	Time		Score		Set 1	Set 2	Set 3	Set 4	Set 5	Total	Report
11 Feb	19:30	Zenit Saint Petersburg (Russia)	3–0	(Montenegro) Budvanska Rivijera	25–17	25–18	25–21			75–56	Report
11 Feb	19:00	Hypo Tirol Alpenvolleys Haching (Germany)	3–2	(Ukraine) Barkom-Kazhany	25–23	24–26	25–14	21–25	15–11	110–99	Report
12 Feb	20:30	Lindemans Aalst (Belgium)	3–1	(Croatia) Mladost Zagreb	25–23	18–25	25–21	25–13		93–82	Report
13 Feb	20:00	Draisma Dynamo Apeldoorn (Netherlands)	1–3	(Russia) Lokomotiv Novosibirsk	21–25	17–25	25–22	20–25		83–97	Report
12 Feb	19:00	Arkas Izmir (Turkey)	3–0	(Germany) United Volleys Frankfurt	25–21	25–20	25–22			75–63	Report
12 Feb	18:00	CS Arcada Galați (Romania)	3–2	(Turkey) Galatasaray HDI Istanbul	25–17	25–15	18–25	23–25	15–8	106–90	Report
12 Feb	19:00	Mladost Brčko (Bosnia and Herzegovina)	3–2	(France) GFC Ajaccio	25–17	25–23	23–25	12–25	17–15	102–105	Report
12 Feb	18:00	VK Ostrava (Czech Republic)	1–3	(Italy) Leo Shoes Modena	19–25	20–25	25–23	9–25		73–98	Report

=== 4th finals ===
Team 1	Agg.	Team 2	1st leg	2nd leg	Golden Set
Hypo Tirol Alpenvolleys Haching (Germany)	1–5	(Russia) Zenit Saint Petersburg	2–3	1–3	
Lokomotiv Novosibirsk (Russia)	6–0	(Belgium) Lindemans Aalst	3–0	3–0	
Galatasaray HDI Istanbul (Turkey)	5–1	(Turkey) Arkas Izmir	3–1	3–2	
GFC Ajaccio (France)	0–3	(Italy) Leo Shoes Modena	0–3	n/a	

==== First leg ====
Date	Time		Score		Set 1	Set 2	Set 3	Set 4	Set 5	Total	Report
25 Feb	18:30	Hypo Tirol Alpenvolleys Haching (Germany)	2–3	(Russia) Zenit Saint Petersburg	20–25	22–25	25–23	25–23	11–15	103–111	Report
26 Feb	19:00	Lokomotiv Novosibirsk (Russia)	3–0	(Belgium) Lindemans Aalst	27–25	25–16	25–16			77–57	Report
26 Feb	19:00	Galatasaray HDI Istanbul (Turkey)	3–1	(Turkey) Arkas Izmir	24–26	25–23	25–22	25–19		99–90	Report
26 Feb	20:00	GFC Ajaccio (France)	0–3	(Italy) Leo Shoes Modena	26–28	21–25	22–25			69–78	Report

==== Second leg ====
Date	Time		Score		Set 1	Set 2	Set 3	Set 4	Set 5	Total	Report
3 Mar	19:30	Zenit Saint Petersburg (Russia)	3–1	(Germany) Hypo Tirol Alpenvolleys Haching	25–22	23–25	25–10	25–15		98–72	Report
4 Mar	20:30	Lindemans Aalst (Belgium)	0–3	(Russia) Lokomotiv Novosibirsk	12–25	19–25	23–25			54–75	Report
4 Mar	19:00	Arkas Izmir (Turkey)	2–3	(Turkey) Galatasaray HDI Istanbul	19–25	21–25	25–14	25–23	17–19	107–106	Report

== Final phase ==
=== Semifinals ===
Team 1	Agg.	Team 2	1st leg	2nd leg	Golden Set
Lokomotiv Novosibirsk (Russia)	3–0	(Russia) Zenit Saint Petersburg	3–1	–	
Galatasaray HDI Istanbul (Turkey)	–	(Italy) Leo Shoes Modena	–	–	

==== First leg ====
Date	Time		Score		Set 1	Set 2	Set 3	Set 4	Set 5	Total	Report
19 Mar	19:00	Lokomotiv Novosibirsk (Russia)	3–1	(Russia) Zenit Saint Petersburg	25–22	25–23	23–25	25–22		98–92	Report
–	–	Galatasaray HDI Istanbul (Turkey)	–	(Italy) Leo Shoes Modena	–	–	–			0–0	

==== Second leg ====
Date	Time		Score		Set 1	Set 2	Set 3	Set 4	Set 5	Total	Report
–	–	Zenit Saint Petersburg (Russia)	–	(Russia) Lokomotiv Novosibirsk	–	–	–			0–0	
–	–	Leo Shoes Modena (Italy)	–	(Turkey) Galatasaray HDI Istanbul	–	–	–			0–0	
