= Jay Blankenau =

Canadian volleyball player (born 1989)

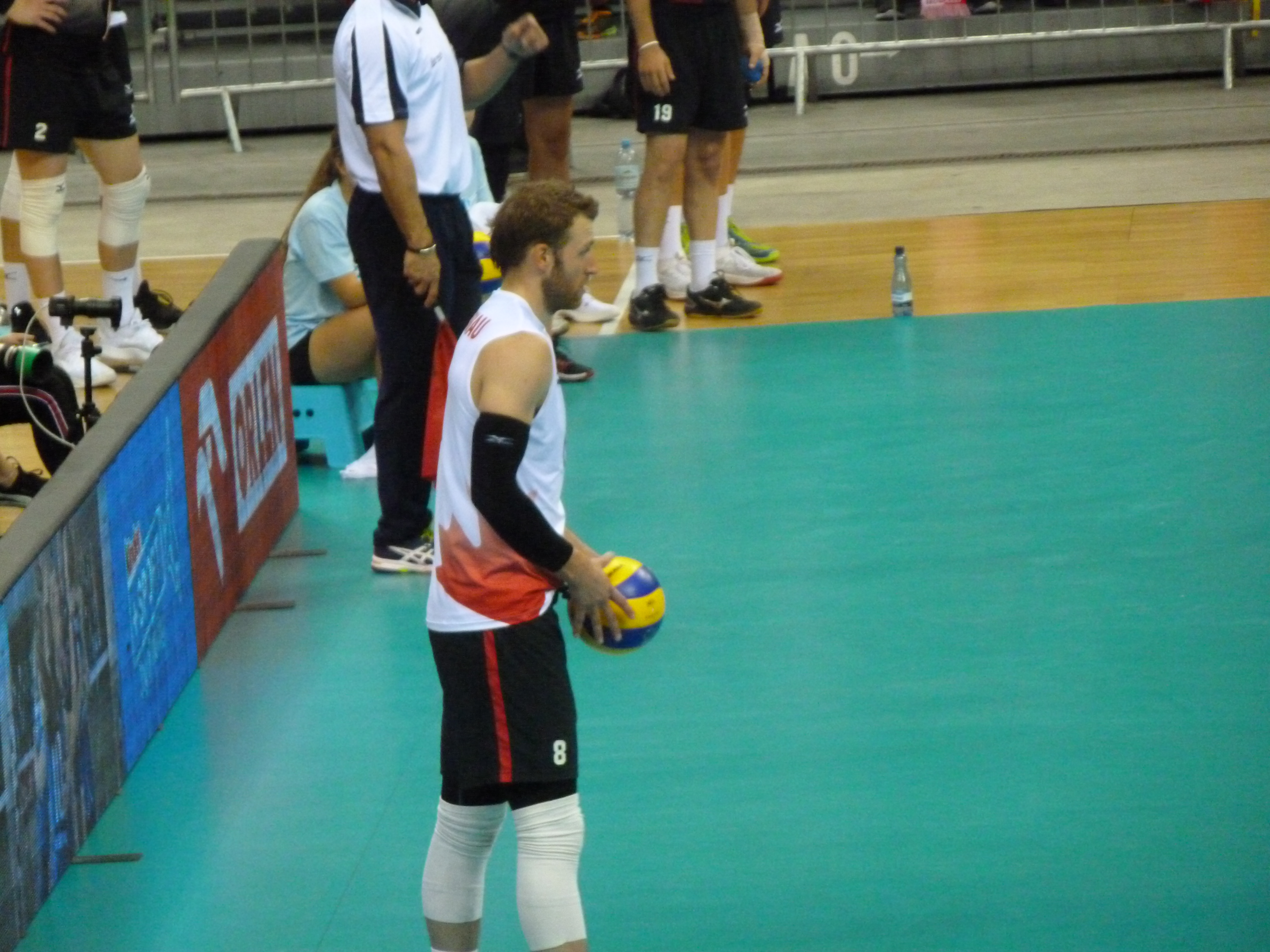
- Blankenau in 2018

Personal information
- Full name: Jay Michael Blankenau
- Born: 27 September 1989 (age 37); Edmonton, Alberta, Canada
- Height: 1.94 m (6 ft 4 in)
- Weight: 90 kg (198 lb)
- Spike: 340 cm (134 in)
- Block: 315 cm (124 in)
- Education: Mount Royal University; University of Calgary

Volleyball information
- Position: Setter
- Current club: Halkbank

Career
Years	Teams
2007–2009; 2009–2012; 2013–2014; 2015–2016; 2016–2017; 2017–2019; 2019–2021; 2021–2022; 2022–2023; 2023–2024; 2024–	Mount Royal Cougars; Calgary Dinos; MAS Niki Aiginio; Lycurgus Groningen; SWD Powervolleys Düren; Noliko Maaseik; Arkas İzmir; Projekt Warsaw; Tourcoing LM; PAOK Thessaloniki; Halkbank

National team
2014–	Canada

Jay Michael Blankenau (born 27 September 1989) is a Canadian professional volleyball player. A member of the Canada national team, and a participant at the Olympic Games (Rio 2016, Tokyo 2020).

== Personal life ==
Jay Blankenau was born in Edmonton to Shannon Schurman and Mike Blankenau. He attended both, Mount Royal University, and the University of Calgary, as well as played for both respective teams.

== Career ==
Blankenau began his post–school volleyball career training at the Team Canada Full Time Training Center in Gatineau. He spent the 2012/13 and 2014/15 season there, spending a season at Greek club MAS Niki Aiginio in between. In 2015, he signed a contract with Dutch club Abiant Lycurgus, helping them win the championship. For the 2016/17 season, he joined SWD Powervolleys Düren in Germany.

=== National team ===
Blankenau joined the senior national team in 2014. He was a member of the Canadian national team that finished 5th at the 2016 Summer Olympics. In June 2021, Blankenau was named to the Canada's 2020 Olympic team.

== Honours ==
=== Clubs ===
- National championships
  - 2015/2016 Dutch Supercup, with Abiant Lycurgus Groningen
  - 2015/2016 Dutch Cup, with Abiant Lycurgus Groningen
  - 2015/2016 Dutch Championship, with Abiant Lycurgus Groningen
  - 2017/2018 Belgian Championship, with Noliko Maaseik
  - 2018/2019 Belgian Championship, with Noliko Maaseik
