= Uladzislau Davyskiba =

Belarusian volleyball player (born 2001)

Personal information
- Full name: Uladzislau Sergeyevich Davyskiba
- Born: 31 March 2001 (age 25) Zhlobin, Belarus
- Height: 1.97 m (6 ft 6 in)

Volleyball information
- Position: Outside hitter
- Current club: Zenit-Kazan
- Number: 9

Career
- Years: Team
- 2017–2020 2020–2023 2023–2026 2026–: Stroitel Minsk; Vero Volley Monza; Modena Volley; Zenit-Kazan

National team
- Years: Team
- –: Belarus

Uladzislau Sergeyevich Davyskiba (Belarusian: Уладзіслаў Сяргеевіч Давыскіба; born 31 March 2001) is a Belarusian professional volleyball player who plays as an outside hitter for VC Zenit-Kazan and the Belarus national team.

== Personal life ==
Davyskiba was born in Zhlobin in eastern Belarus. His wife, Hanna is also a professional volleyball player.

== Career ==
=== Club ===
Davyskiba started his professional volleyball career in his native country, playing for Stroitel Minsk. For the 2020–21 season, he joined Vero Volley Monza in Italy.

In 2022, his team made it to the finals of the 2021–22 CEV Cup, and emerged victorious from the matches against Tours VB. Davyskiba earned the Most Valuable Player award for the second leg match held in Tours.

== Honours ==
=== Club ===
- CEV Cup
  - 2021–22 – with Vero Volley Monza
- Domestic
  - 2017–18 Belarusian SuperCup, with Stroitel Minsk
  - 2017–18 Belarusian Cup, with Stroitel Minsk

=== Individual awards ===
- 2022: CEV Cup – Most valuable player
