= Konstantin Bakun =

Russian volleyball player

Personal information
- Full name: Konstantin Anatoliyevich Bakun
- Nationality: (Ukraine) Ukrainian (Russia) Russian
- Born: 15 March 1985 (age 41); Donetsk, Soviet Union, Ukraine
- Height: 2.04 m (6 ft 8 in)
- Weight: 105 kg (231 lb)
- Spike: 348 cm (137 in)
- Block: 330 cm (130 in)

Volleyball information
- Position: Opposite
- Current club: Qatar SC
- Number: 1

Career
Years	Teams
2004–2007; 2007–2009; 2009–2010; 2010–2014; 2014–2016; 2016–2017; 2017–2018; 2018–2020; 2020–2021; 2021	(Ukraine) Azot Cherkasy (Ukraine) Lokomotiv Kiev (Russia) Dinamo Krasnodar (Russia) Fakel Novy Urengoy (Russia) Gazprom-Ugra Surgut (Russia) Dynamo Moscow (Russia) Belogorie Belgorod (Russia) Lokomotiv Novosibirsk; Al Rayyan; Qatar SC

National team
2008–2009	Ukraine
2016–2018	Russia

Konstantin Anatoliyevich Bakun (Russian: Константин Анатольевич Бакун) (born 15 March 1985) is a Ukrainian volleyball player of Russian citizenship (since 2011), member of the Russia men's national volleyball team, Ukrainian Champion (2006, 2008), Russian Champion (2020).

== Sporting achievements ==
=== Clubs ===
- CEV Cup
  - 2015/2016 – with Gazprom-Ugra Surgut
  - 2017/2018 – with Belogorie Belgorod
- National championships
  - 2005/2006 Ukrainian Championship, with Azot Cherkasy
  - 2007/2008 Ukrainian Championship, with Lokomotiv Kiev
  - 2019/2020 Russian Championship, with Lokomotiv Novosibirsk

=== Individual awards ===
- 2015/2016: Russian Championship – Best Scorer
- 2017/2018: CEV Cup – Most Valuable Player
