= SWD Powervolleys Düren =

German volleyball club

- Founded: 1965
- Ground: Arena Kreis Düren (Capacity: 2,878)
- Chairman: Rüdiger Hein
- Manager: Rafał Murczkiewicz
- League: Bundesliga
- 2021–22: 4th place
- Website: Club home page

Uniforms
Home	Away

SWD Powervolleys Düren is a German professional men's volleyball club which plays in the German Bundesliga. They play their home matches at the Arena Kreis in Düren.

== Former names ==
- 2001–2014: evivo Düren
- 1965–2001: Dürener TV
