= OK Mladost Brčko =

Volleyball club

- Founded: 2007; 18 years ago
- Manager: Branko Mišić
- League: Premier League
- 2020-21: 1st
- Website: Club home page

Uniforms
| Home | Away |

Odbojkaški Klub Mladost Brčko, commonly referred to as OK Mladost Brčko or simply Mladost is a volleyball club from Brčko, Bosnia and Herzegovina. It currently competes in the Premier League, the top tier volleyball league of Bosnia and Herzegovina. With seven national titles won it is one of the most successful volleyball teams in the country.

== History ==
OK Mladost Brčko was founded in 2007. In 2018 they reached 8th Finals of the CEV Cup losing to TV Amriswil Volleyball.

== Honours ==
- Bosnia and Herzegovina Championship:
  - Winners (7): 2014, 2015, 2016, 2017, 2018, 2019, 2021
  - Runner-up (1): 2012
- Volleyball Cup of Bosnia and Herzegovina:
  - Winners (8): 2014, 2015, 2016, 2017, 2018, 2019, 2021, 2022
  - Runner-up (1): 2011
- Republika Srpska Championship:
  - Winners (1): 2010
- Volleyball Cup of Republika Srpska:
  - Winners (10): 2011, 2012, 2013, 2014, 2015, 2016, 2017, 2018, 2019, 2020, 2021

== European record ==
| Season | Competition | Round | Club | Home | Away | Aggregate |
|---|---|---|---|---|---|---|
| 2021–22 | CEV Cup | | | | | |
| 2021–22 | CEV Cup | 1/32 | Skra Bełchatów | 0–3 | 0–3 | 0–6 |

== Recent seasons ==
The recent season-by-season performance of the club:

| Season | Division | Tier | Position |
|---|---|---|---|
| 2014-15 | Premier League | I | 1st |
| 2015-16 | Premier League | I | 1st |
| 2016-17 | Premier League | I | 1st |
| 2017-18 | Premier League | I | 1st |
| 2018-19 | Premier League | I | 1st |
| 2020–21 | Premier League | I | 1st |
| 2021–22 | Premier League | I | 1st |

== Coaching history ==
- Branko Mišić
