= Volley Aalst =

Belgian volleyball club

Volley Lindemans Aalst
- Short name: Lindemans Aalst
- Founded: 1967
- Ground: De Schotte; Aalst; Belgium (Capacity: 2000)
- Chairman: (Belgium) Jan Luppens
- Manager: (Belgium) Johan Devoghel
- Captain: Robbe Van De Velde
- League: Lotto Volley League
- Website: Club home page

Uniforms
Home	Away

Volley Lindemans Aalst (formerly known as Asse-Lennik and VC Lennik) is a volleyball club based in Aalst, Belgium.

The first squad currently plays in the Lotto Volley League, the highest level of Belgian men's volleyball. The club has won the league twice.

The team has played several times in the Challenge Cup, formerly known as CEV Cup. It reached the Challenge Cup finals in the 2025-26 season.

The club's colours are orange, often combined with white or black. Their current title sponsor Lindemans has been partnered with the club since 2015.

== Honours ==
- Belgian Championship

Winners (2): 1986–87, 1987–88

- Belgian Cup

Winners (4): 1984–85, 1991–92, 1992–93, 2014–15

- Belgian SuperCup

Winners (1): 2015–16

== Current squad ==
Coach: (Belgium) Frank Depestele

#	Nat.	Name
2	(Netherlands)	Beau Wortelboer
5	(Belgium)	Viktor Speltinckx
6	(Belgium)	Robbe Van de Velde
7	(United States)	Nicholas Slight
8	(Belgium)	Jasper Verhamme
9	(Portugal)	Nuno Marques
10	(Belgium)	Arwen Van Kerckhove
12	(Canada)	Henry Rempel
15	(United States)	Camden Gianni
16	(Belgium)	Ward Devoghel
20	(Belgium)	Simon Luka Vlahovic
21	(Belgium)	Matis Verwimp
24	(Belgium)	Warre Mertens
