= Lycurgus (volleyball) =

Dutch volleyball club

Lycurgus Groningen
- Founded: 1952
- Ground: MartiniPlaza (Capacity: 4,350)
- Chairman: Arie Wink
- Manager: Mark Lebedew
- League: Dutch Eredivisie
- 2022–23: 3rd place
- Website: Club home page

Lycurgus (Dutch pronunciation: [liˈkʏrɣʏs]) is a Dutch professional men's volleyball club based in Groningen. They currently compete in the top flight of Dutch volleyball, the Dutch Eredivisie.

== History ==
Abiant Lycurgus had relative success through the 1970s and 1980s, but the club never won any championships. It reached the national final in 2011/12 and 2014/15, but lost both matches, before finally winning the Dutch championship and Dutch cup in the 2015/16 season.

== Team ==
- Current Roster (2023/24 season)

No.	Name	Date of birth	Position
4	(United States) Cole Bogner	28 November 1999 (age 25)	setter
9	(Netherlands) Sam Gortzak	15 March 1995 (age 30)	setter
19	(United States) Cal Fisher	9 May 1999 (age 25)	opposite
1	(Netherlands) Thomas Sleurink	18 April 1998 (age 26)	outside hitter
5	(United States) Kyle McCauley	23 January 1999 (age 26)	outside hitter
8	(United States) Cole Gillis	7 September 2000 (age 24)	outside hitter
10	(Netherlands) Maarten Bartels	29 July 1998 (age 26)	outside hitter
11	(Netherlands) Guus Boer	2 April 2004 (age 20)	outside hitter
13	(Netherlands) Ramon Martinez-Gion	12 September 1990 (age 34)	outside hitter
2	(Netherlands) Arjan Westera	26 April 1994 (age 30)	middle blocker
6	(Netherlands) Luuk Hofhuis	28 September 2001 (age 23)	middle blocker
14	(Netherlands) Robin Boekhoudt	15 February 1998 (age 27)	middle blocker
14	(Netherlands) Gustavs Freimanis	13 March 2001 (age 24)	middle blocker
17	(Netherlands) Niels De Vries	4 July 1996 (age 28)	middle blocker
7	(Netherlands) Niels Kuijpens	14 May 1996 (age 28)	libero
20	(Netherlands) Jeffery Klok	29 October 1998 (age 26)	libero
Head coach:		(Netherlands) Arjan Taaij	

== Honours ==
- Dutch Championship

Winners (3): 2015–16, 2016–17, 2017–18

- Dutch Cup

Winners (5): 2015–16, 2019–20, 2020–21, 2021–22, 2022–23

- Dutch SuperCup

Winners (6): 2015–16, 2016–17, 2017–18, 2018–19, 2020–21, 2022–23
