= Vammalan Lentopallo =

Finnish volleyball club

Valepa
- Full name: Vammalan Lentopallo
- Founded: 1978
- Ground: VeXve Arena; Vammala, Finland
- Capacity: 1500
- Chairman: Arto Satonen
- League: Mestaruusliiga
- 2017-2018: Mestaruusliiga 1st place

Vammalan Lentopallo — Valepa is a volleyball team in southwest Finland founded in 1978. It is based in the Vammala district of the town of Sastamala, in the Pirkanmaa Region. Valepa plays in the highest level in Finland.

== History ==
Vammalan Lentopallo was founded 1978, with the club's first season in SM-liiga in 1980–1981.

VaLePa is a club where young players have reached a professional level. Several of the organization's junior players and other athletes have made their professional debuts with the team. These players include Olli-Pekka Ojansivu, Olli Kunnari, Mikko Oivanen, and Matti Oivanen.

The team's best result to date is the national champion title, which it won twice (in the 2011-2012 and 2013–2014 seasons). In 2012, it also won the Finnish Cup.

=== European competitions ===
Valepa played in the CEV Challenge Cup in the 2008–2009 season, where it lost both the home match (1–3) and the return match in Burgas (3–0) to the Bulgarian Neftehimik team. In 2012-2013 VaLePa played in the CEV Cup. The first round was against the Estonian team of Selver Tallinn. VaLePa won through golden set after both teams had won a match (Selver - VaLePa 3–2, VaLePa - Selver 3–0). In the second round, VaLePa faced the Italian Andreoli Latina, which was stronger in the golden set (VaLePa - Latina 3–1, Latina - VaLePa 3–0).

=== New Arena ===
Season 2012-2013 was a big change for the club. Old small homeground Sylvää was abandoned for new bigger VexVe Arena. The team sometimes still train in Sylvää and second team also plays there some of their games.

=== Achievements ===
- Finland league bronze 1992, 2008,2013 and 2014
- Finland league silver 2011
- Finland league champion 2012 and 2014
- Finnish Cup winner 2012
- Finnish Cup runners-up 2013 and 2014

== Team ==
=== Season 2018-2019 ===
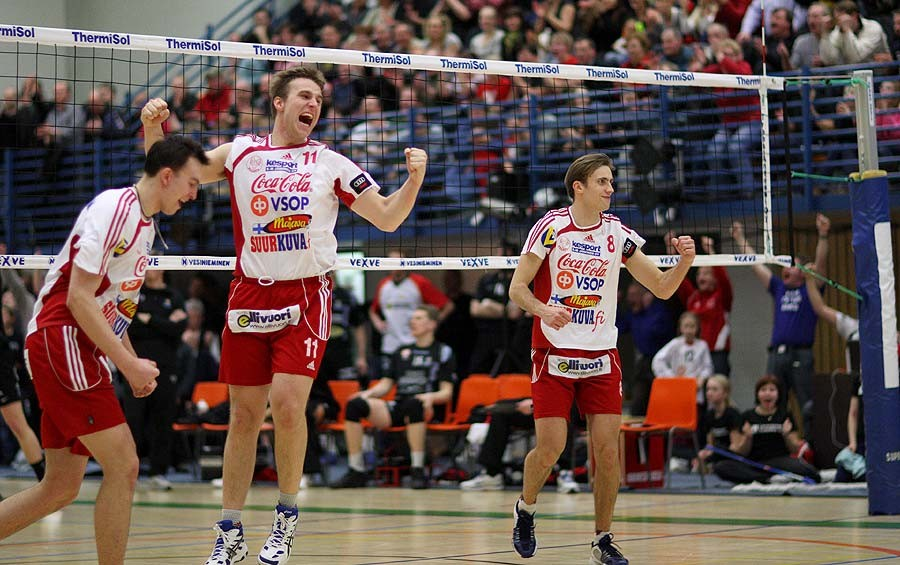
Season 2007-2008

Setters

- Mikko Esko
- Arttu Lehtimäki

Middle-blockers

- Daniel Jansen Van Doorn (CAN)
- Markus Kaurto
- Tommi Siirilä
- Mikko Karjarinta
- Rami Rekomaa

Wing-spikers

- Olli Kunnari
- Erik Sundberg
- Niko Suihkonen

Opposite

- Arvis Greene (USA)
- Urpo Sivula
- Aaro Nikula

Libero

- Alan Barbosa Domingos

Head coach

- Radovan Gacic

Assistant coach

- Janne Kangaskokko

Club chairman

- Arto Satonen — also a member of the Parliament of Finland.
