= Volley Amriswil =

Swiss volleyball club

Lindaren Volley Amriswil
- Founded: 1969
- Chairman: Martin Salvisberg
- Manager: Vincent Pichette
- League: Nationalliga A
- 2021–22: Champions
- Website: Club home page

Lindaren Volley Amriswil is a Swiss professional men's volleyball club based in Amriswil, Switzerland.

The A-grade men's team established itself as a top-tier Swiss team in the early 1990s and has continuously finished the Swiss championships in top ranks ever since.

The men's semi-professional tema club has qualified for and participated in European Cups several times since 1995. Several team members have played on the Swiss national team.

== Honours ==
- Swiss Championship

Winners (5): 2008–09, 2009–10, 2015–16, 2016–17, 2021–22

- Swiss Cup

Winners (7): 1998–99, 2008–09, 2011–12, 2016–17, 2017–18, 2018–19, 2021–22
