= 2025–26 CEV Champions League qualification =

Qualification for volleyball competition

This article shows the qualification phase for the 2025–26 CEV Champions League. 14 teams play in the qualification round. The two remaining teams will join the other 18 teams automatically qualified for the League round. All 12 eliminated teams will compete in the 2025–26 CEV Cup.

ACH Volley Ljubljana and Guaguas Las Palmas qualified for the group stage of the 2025–26 CEV Champions League.

== Participating teams ==
The drawing of lots was held on 15 July 2025 in Luxembourg City.

Rank	Country	Team(s)	Outcome (Qualified to)
10	Bulgaria	Levski Sofia	CEV Cup
11	Slovenia	ACH Volley Ljubljana	CEV Champions League
12	Serbia	Radnički Kragujevac	CEV Cup
13	Spain	Guaguas Las Palmas	CEV Champions League
14	Greece	Olympiacos Piraeus	CEV Cup
15	Finland	Akaa Volley	CEV Cup
16	Romania	Dinamo București	CEV Cup
17	Croatia	Mursa Osijek	CEV Cup
18	Austria	TSV Raiffeisen Hartberg	CEV Cup
20	Netherlands	Orion Stars Doetinchem	CEV Cup
22	Bosnia and Herzegovina	Napredak Odžak	CEV Cup
27	North Macedonia	OK Strumica	CEV Cup
28	Hungary	MÁV Foxconn Székesfehérvár	CEV Cup
32	Azerbaijan	Azerrail Baku	CEV Cup

== First round ==
- The winners of the ties qualify for the second round.
- Aggregate score is counted as follows: 3 points for 3–0 or 3–1 win, 2 points for 3–2 win, 1 point for 2–3 loss.
- In case the teams are tied after two legs, a Golden Set is played immediately at the completion of the second leg.
- All times are local.

Team 1	Agg.	Team 2	1st leg	2nd leg	Golden Set
TSV Raiffeisen Hartberg (Austria)	3–3	(Finland) Akaa Volley	3–1	0–3	15–13
Azerrail Baku (Azerbaijan)	0–6	(Serbia) Radnički Kragujevac	0–3	0–3	
OK Strumica (North Macedonia)	0–6	(Romania) Dinamo București	0–3	0–3	
Orion Stars Doetinchem (Netherlands)	0–6	(Slovenia) ACH Volley Ljubljana	1–3	0–3	
Napredak Odžak (Bosnia and Herzegovina)	0–6	(Greece) Olympiacos Piraeus	0–3	0–3	
MÁV Foxconn Székesfehérvár (Hungary)	0–6	(Spain) Guaguas Las Palmas	1–3	0–3	
	Bye	(Croatia) Mursa Osijek			
	Bye	(Bulgaria) Levski Sofia			

=== First leg ===
Date	Time		Score		Set 1	Set 2	Set 3	Set 4	Set 5	Total	Report
23 Oct	20:25	TSV Raiffeisen Hartberg (Austria)	3–1	(Finland) Akaa Volley	25–22	25–19	27–29	25–22		102–92	Report
23 Oct	19:00	Azerrail Baku (Azerbaijan)	0–3	(Serbia) Radnički Kragujevac	21–25	18–25	22–25			61–75	Report
22 Oct	17:00	OK Strumica (North Macedonia)	0–3	(Romania) Dinamo București	18–25	20–25	19–25			57–75	Report
22 Oct	20:00	Orion Stars Doetinchem (Netherlands)	1–3	(Slovenia) ACH Volley Ljubljana	20–25	25–14	24–26	26–28		95–93	Report
22 Oct	20:00	Napredak Odžak (Bosnia and Herzegovina)	0–3	(Greece) Olympiacos Piraeus	21–25	9–25	17–25			47–75	Report
21 Oct	18:00	MÁV Foxconn Székesfehérvár (Hungary)	1–3	(Spain) Guaguas Las Palmas	21–25	16–25	25–21	19–25		81–96	Report

=== Second leg ===
Date	Time		Score		Set 1	Set 2	Set 3	Set 4	Set 5	Total	Report
29 Oct	18:30	Akaa Volley (Finland)	3–0	(Austria) TSV Raiffeisen Hartberg	25–22	25–20	25–22			75–64	Report
Golden set		Akaa Volley (Finland)	13–15	(Austria) TSV Raiffeisen Hartberg							
29 Oct	18:00	Radnički Kragujevac (Serbia)	3–0	(Azerbaijan) Azerrail Baku	25–23	25–22	25–19			75–64	Report
28 Oct	19:00	Dinamo București (Romania)	3–0	(North Macedonia) OK Strumica	25–17	25–17	25–13			75–47	Report
30 Oct	18:00	ACH Volley Ljubljana (Slovenia)	3–0	(Netherlands) Orion Stars Doetinchem	25–15	25–19	25–20			75–54	Report
30 Oct	19:00	Olympiacos Piraeus (Greece)	3–0	(Bosnia and Herzegovina) Napredak Odžak	25–15	25–18	25–18			75–51	Report
30 Oct	19:00	Guaguas Las Palmas (Spain)	3–0	(Hungary) MÁV Foxconn Székesfehérvár	25–18	25–14	25–20			75–52	Report

== Second round ==
- The winners of the ties qualify for the third round.
- Aggregate score is counted as follows: 3 points for 3–0 or 3–1 win, 2 points for 3–2 win, 1 point for 2–3 loss.
- In case the teams are tied after two legs, a Golden Set is played immediately at the completion of the second leg.
- All times are local.

Team 1	Agg.	Team 2	1st leg	2nd leg	Golden Set
TSV Raiffeisen Hartberg (Austria)	1–5	(Serbia) Radnički Kragujevac	2–3	0–3	
Dinamo București (Romania)	3–3	(Slovenia) ACH Volley Ljubljana	3–1	1–3	10–15
Olympiacos Piraeus (Greece)	0–6	(Spain) Guaguas Las Palmas	1–3	0–3	
Mursa Osijek (Croatia)	1–5	(Bulgaria) Levski Sofia	2–3	0–3	

=== First leg ===
Date	Time		Score		Set 1	Set 2	Set 3	Set 4	Set 5	Total	Report
5 Nov	20:25	TSV Raiffeisen Hartberg (Austria)	2–3	(Serbia) Radnički Kragujevac	22–25	25–18	26–24	20–25	11–15	104–107	Report
4 Nov	19:00	Dinamo București (Romania)	3–1	(Slovenia) ACH Volley Ljubljana	21–25	25–18	25–22	25–20		96–85	Report
6 Nov	18:30	Olympiacos Piraeus (Greece)	1–3	(Spain) Guaguas Las Palmas	20–25	25–18	18–25	24–26		87–94	Report
4 Nov	18:00	Mursa Osijek (Croatia)	2–3	(Bulgaria) Levski Sofia	25–22	23–25	22–25	27–25	14–16	111–113	Report

=== Second leg ===
Date	Time		Score		Set 1	Set 2	Set 3	Set 4	Set 5	Total	Report
12 Nov	18:00	Radnički Kragujevac (Serbia)	3–0	(Austria) TSV Raiffeisen Hartberg	25–23	25–14	25–18			75–55	Report
13 Nov	20:00	ACH Volley Ljubljana (Slovenia)	3–1	(Romania) Dinamo București	25–13	19–25	25–19	25–19		94–76	Report
Golden set		ACH Volley Ljubljana (Slovenia)	15–10	(Romania) Dinamo București							
12 Nov	19:00	Guaguas Las Palmas (Spain)	3–0	(Greece) Olympiacos Piraeus	25–10	25–23	25–21			75–54	Report
12 Nov	20:00	Levski Sofia (Bulgaria)	3–0	(Croatia) Mursa Osijek	25–18	25–21	26–24			76–63	Report

== Third round ==
- The winners of the ties qualify for the league round.
- Aggregate score is counted as follows: 3 points for 3–0 or 3–1 win, 2 points for 3–2 win, 1 point for 2–3 loss.
- In case the teams are tied after two legs, a Golden Set is played immediately at the completion of the second leg.
- All times are local.

Team 1	Agg.	Team 2	1st leg	2nd leg
Radnički Kragujevac (Serbia)	0–6	(Slovenia) ACH Volley Ljubljana	0–3	0–3
Guaguas Las Palmas (Spain)	6–0	(Bulgaria) Levski Sofia	3–0	3–0

=== First leg ===
Date	Time		Score		Set 1	Set 2	Set 3	Set 4	Set 5	Total	Report
19 Nov	18:00	Radnički Kragujevac (Serbia)	0–3	(Slovenia) ACH Volley Ljubljana	13–25	20–25	23–25			56–75	Report
19 Nov	19:00	Guaguas Las Palmas (Spain)	3–0	(Bulgaria) Levski Sofia	25–17	25–23	25–18			75–58	Report

=== Second leg ===
Date	Time		Score		Set 1	Set 2	Set 3	Set 4	Set 5	Total	Report
27 Nov	20:00	ACH Volley Ljubljana (Slovenia)	3–0	(Serbia) Radnički Kragujevac	25–17	25–21	25–20			75–58	Report
26 Nov	20:00	Levski Sofia (Bulgaria)	0–3	(Spain) Guaguas Las Palmas	18–25	20–25	19–25			57–75	Report
