= 2025–26 CEV Cup =

European volleyball club competition

- League: CEV Cup
- Sport: Volleyball
- Duration: 12 November 2025 – 22 April 2026
- Teams: 36
- Finals champions: (Italy) Gas Sales Bluenergy Piacenza
- Finals MVP: (Cuba) Robertlandy Simón

CEV Cup seasons
- ← 2024–25 2026–27 →

The 2025–26 CEV Cup was the 54th edition of the second most important European volleyball club competition organised by the European Volleyball Confederation.

Gas Sales Bluenergy Piacenza won their first ever European title, beating SVG Lüneburg in the finals. Robertlandy Simón was named MVP of the final match.

== Participating teams ==
The drawing of lots was held on 15 July 2025 in Luxembourg City.

Rank	Country	Number of teams	Teams
1	Turkey	2	ON Hotels Alanya Bld, Fenerbahçe
2	Greece	3	AONS Milon, Olympiacos ONEX, Panathinaikos
3	France	2	Tourcoing Lille Métropole, Alterna SPVB Poitiers
4	Italy	1	Gas Sales Bluenergy Piacenza
5	Poland	1	Jastrzębski Węgiel
6	Czech Republic	2	Jihostroj České Budějovice, ČEZ Karlovarsko
7	Belgium	2	Greenyard Maaseik, Tectum Achel
8	Romania	3	SCM Craiova, CS Dinamo București, CSM Corona Brașov
10	Switzerland	2	Volley Amriswil, Volley Schönenwerd
11	Germany	2	Helios Grizzlys Giesen, VfB Friedrichshafen
12	Netherlands	2	Draisma Dynamo Apeldoorn, Orion Stars Doetinchem
13	Austria	2	TSV Raiffeisen Hartberg, SK Zadruga Aich/Dob
14	Spain	1	Río Duero Soria
15	Serbia	2	Vojvodina Novi Sad, Radnički Kragujevac
16	Bulgaria	2	Lokomotiv Avia Plovdiv, Levski Sofia
17	Slovenia	1	OK Alpacem Kanal
19	Finland	1	Akaa Volley
22	Croatia	1	MOK Mursa Osijek
23	Hungary	1	MÁV Foxconn Székesfehérvár
27	Bosnia and Herzegovina	1	Napredak Odžak
30	Azerbaijan	1	Azerrail Baku
33	North Macedonia	1	VC Strumica

== Format ==
Qualification round (Home and away matches):

- 32nd finals

Main phase (Home and away matches):

- 16th finals → 8th finals → Playoffs → 4th finals

Final phase (Home and away matches):

- Semifinals → Finals

Aggregate score is counted as follows: 3 points for 3–0 or 3–1 win, 2 points for 3–2 win, 1 point for 2–3 loss.
In case the teams are tied after two legs, a Golden Set is played immediately at the completion of the second leg.

== Qualification round ==
=== 32nd finals ===
Team 1	Agg.	Team 2	1st leg	2nd leg
Jihostroj České Budějovice (Czech Republic)	6–0	(North Macedonia) VC Strumica	3–0	3–0
Volley Schönenwerd (Switzerland)	6–0	(Bosnia and Herzegovina) Napredak Odžak	3–0	3–1
Greenyard Maaseik (Belgium)	4–2	(Romania) SCM Craiova	3–1	2–3
Azerrail Baku (Azerbaijan)	0–6	(Netherlands) Orion Stars Doetinchem	1–3	0–3
Helios Grizzlys Giesen (Germany)	2–4	(Hungary) MÁV Foxconn Székesfehérvár	3–2	1–3
	Bye	(Finland) Akaa Volley		

==== First leg ====
Date	Time		Score		Set 1	Set 2	Set 3	Set 4	Set 5	Total	Report
12 Nov	18:00	Jihostroj České Budějovice (Czech Republic)	3–0	(North Macedonia) VC Strumica	25–18	25–12	26–24			76–54	Report
12 Nov	19:30	Volley Schönenwerd (Switzerland)	3–0	(Bosnia and Herzegovina) Napredak Odžak	25–22	25–22	25–17			75–61	Report
12 Nov	20:30	Greenyard Maaseik (Belgium)	3–1	(Romania) SCM Craiova	25–12	23–25	25–21	26–24		99–82	Report
13 Nov	17:00	Azerrail Baku (Azerbaijan)	1–3	(Netherlands) Orion Stars Doetinchem	25–23	18–25	24–26	26–28		93–102	Report
13 Nov	19:00	Helios Grizzlys Giesen (Germany)	3–2	(Hungary) MÁV Foxconn Székesfehérvár	20–25	16–25	25–22	25–15	15–10	101–97	Report

==== Second leg ====
Date	Time		Score		Set 1	Set 2	Set 3	Set 4	Set 5	Total	Report
18 Nov	18:00	MÁV Foxconn Székesfehérvár (Hungary)	3–1	(Germany) Helios Grizzlys Giesen	25–21	24–26	25–23	25–20		99–90	Report
19 Nov	19:00	VC Strumica (North Macedonia)	0–3	(Czech Republic) Jihostroj České Budějovice	17–25	15–25	19–25			51–75	Report
19 Nov	19:00	SCM Craiova (Romania)	3–2	(Belgium) Greenyard Maaseik	22–25	20–25	25–17	25–15	17–15	109–97	Report
19 Nov	20:00	Orion Stars Doetinchem (Netherlands)	3–0	(Azerbaijan) Azerrail Baku	25–14	25–12	25–19			75–45	Report
19 Nov	20:00	Napredak Odžak (Bosnia and Herzegovina)	1–3	(Switzerland) Volley Schönenwerd	18–25	21–25	25–16	26–28		90–94	Report

== Main phase ==
=== 16th finals ===
Team 1	Agg.	Team 2	1st leg	2nd leg	Golden Set
Alterna SPVB Poitiers (France)	6–0	(Greece) Panathinaikos	3–0	3–1	
ON Hotels Alanya Bld (Turkey)	5–1	(Serbia) Vojvodina Novi Sad	3–2	3–1	
MÁV Foxconn Székesfehérvár (Hungary)	0–6	(Poland) Jastrzębski Węgiel	1–3	0–3	
MOK Mursa Osijek (Croatia)	2–4	(Slovenia) OK Alpacem Kanal	3–2	1–3	
Radnički Kragujevac (Serbia)	0–6	(Turkey) Fenerbahçe	0–3	0–3	
Olympiacos ONEX (Greece)	4–2	(Netherlands) Draisma Dynamo Apeldoorn	3–0	2–3	
TSV Raiffeisen Hartberg (Austria)	0–6	(Belgium) Tectum Achel	0–3	0–3	
CS Dinamo București (Romania)	6–0	(Bulgaria) Lokomotiv Avia Plovdiv	3–0	3–1	
Gas Sales Bluenergy Piacenza (Italy)	3–3	(Czech Republic) Jihostroj České Budějovice	3–1	1–3	19–17
Volley Schönenwerd (Switzerland)	3–3	(Romania) CSM Corona Brașov	3–1	0–3	12–15
AONS Milon (Greece)	0–6	(Czech Republic) ČEZ Karlovarsko	1–3	0–3	
Levski Sofia (Bulgaria)	6–6	(Germany) VfB Friedrichshafen	0–3	3–1	13–15
Orion Stars Doetinchem (Netherlands)	6–6	(Switzerland) Volley Amriswil	3–1	0–3	15–10
Greenyard Maaseik (Belgium)	4–2	(France) Tourcoing Lille Métropole	3–1	2–3	
Akaa Volley (Finland)	6–6	(Austria) SK Zadruga Aich/Dob	0–3	3–1	15–8
	Bye	(Spain) Río Duero Soria			

==== First leg ====
Date	Time		Score		Set 1	Set 2	Set 3	Set 4	Set 5	Total	Report
9 Dec	19:30	Alterna SPVB Poitiers (France)	3–0	(Greece) Panathinaikos	25–16	25–16	25–22			75–54	Report
10 Dec	18:00	ON Hotels Alanya Bld (Turkey)	3–2	(Serbia) Vojvodina Novi Sad	22–25	25–27	29–27	25–22	15–8	116–109	Report
10 Dec	18:00	MÁV Foxconn Székesfehérvár (Hungary)	1–3	(Poland) Jastrzębski Węgiel	24–26	25–17	12–25	18–25		79–93	Report
10 Dec	18:00	MOK Mursa Osijek (Croatia)	3–2	(Slovenia) OK Alpacem Kanal	22–25	25–19	21–25	25–14	15–10	108–93	Report
10 Dec	18:00	Radnički Kragujevac (Serbia)	0–3	(Turkey) Fenerbahçe	23–25	19–25	36–38			78–88	Report
10 Dec	19:00	Olympiacos ONEX (Greece)	3–0	(Netherlands) Draisma Dynamo Apeldoorn	25–17	25–23	25–18			75–58	Report
10 Dec	19:00	TSV Raiffeisen Hartberg (Austria)	0–3	(Belgium) Tectum Achel	22–25	14–25	18–25			54–75	Report
10 Dec	19:00	CS Dinamo București (Romania)	3–0	(Bulgaria) Lokomotiv Avia Plovdiv	25–21	25–22	25–16			75–59	Report
10 Dec	19:30	Gas Sales Bluenergy Piacenza (Italy)	3–1	(Czech Republic) Jihostroj České Budějovice	24–26	25–14	25–19	25–13		99–72	Report
10 Dec	19:30	Volley Schönenwerd (Switzerland)	3–1	(Romania) CSM Corona Brașov	25–22	21–25	25–23	27–25		98–95	Report
10 Dec	20:00	AONS Milon (Greece)	1–3	(Czech Republic) ČEZ Karlovarsko	25–22	22–25	17–25	27–29		91–101	Report
10 Dec	20:00	Levski Sofia (Bulgaria)	0–3	(Germany) VfB Friedrichshafen	25–27	21–25	21–25			67–77	Report
10 Dec	20:00	Orion Stars Doetinchem (Netherlands)	3–1	(Switzerland) Volley Amriswil	20–25	25–19	25–19	25–16		95–79	Report
10 Dec	20:30	Greenyard Maaseik (Belgium)	3–1	(France) Tourcoing Lille Métropole	23–25	25–23	25–22	25–15		98–85	Report
11 Dec	18:30	Akaa Volley (Finland)	0–3	(Austria) SK Zadruga Aich/Dob	18–25	21–25	20–25			59–75	Report

==== Second leg ====
Date	Time		Score		Set 1	Set 2	Set 3	Set 4	Set 5	Total	Report
6 Jan	18:00	Lokomotiv Avia Plovdiv (Bulgaria)	1–3	(Romania) CS Dinamo București	22–25	25–21	23–25	22–25		92–96	Report
6 Jan	20:00	Tourcoing Lille Métropole (France)	3–2	(Belgium) Greenyard Maaseik	25–14	25–21	23–25	22–25	15–11	110–96	Report
7 Jan	18:00	ČEZ Karlovarsko (Czech Republic)	3–0	(Greece) AONS Milon	25–22	25–18	25–20			75–60	Report
7 Jan	18:00	Panathinaikos (Greece)	1–3	(France) Alterna SPVB Poitiers	22–25	25–20	18–25	22–25		87–95	Report
7 Jan	18:00	Jastrzębski Węgiel (Poland)	3–0	(Hungary) MÁV Foxconn Székesfehérvár	25–12	25–18	25–12			75–42	Report
7 Jan	18:00	Jihostroj České Budějovice (Czech Republic)	3–1	(Italy) Gas Sales Bluenergy Piacenza	26–24	18–25	25–17	25–22		94–88	Report
Golden set		Jihostroj České Budějovice (Czech Republic)	17–19	(Italy) Gas Sales Bluenergy Piacenza							
7 Jan	18:00	CSM Corona Brașov (Romania)	3–0	(Switzerland) Volley Schönenwerd	25–20	25–19	25–21			75–60	Report
Golden set		CSM Corona Brașov (Romania)	15–12	(Switzerland) Volley Schönenwerd							
7 Jan	19:00	SK Zadruga Aich/Dob (Austria)	1–3	(Finland) Akaa Volley	26–28	23–25	25–16	20–25		94–94	Report
Golden set		SK Zadruga Aich/Dob (Austria)	8–15	(Finland) Akaa Volley							
7 Jan	19:00	Volley Amriswil (Switzerland)	3–0	(Netherlands) Orion Stars Doetinchem	27–25	28–26	25–23			80–74	Report
Golden set		Volley Amriswil (Switzerland)	10–15	(Netherlands) Orion Stars Doetinchem							
7 Jan	19:00	Fenerbahçe (Turkey)	3–0	(Serbia) Radnički Kragujevac	25–14	25–15	25–13			75–42	Report
7 Jan	19:30	Draisma Dynamo Apeldoorn (Netherlands)	3–2	(Greece) Olympiacos ONEX	16–25	24–26	26–24	25–12	16–14	107–101	Report
7 Jan	19:30	OK Alpacem Kanal (Slovenia)	3–1	(Croatia) MOK Mursa Osijek	26–24	22–25	25–21	25–14		98–84	Report
7 Jan	20:00	VfB Friedrichshafen (Germany)	1–3	(Bulgaria) Levski Sofia	17–25	22–25	25–21	23–25		87–96	Report
Golden set		VfB Friedrichshafen (Germany)	15–13	(Bulgaria) Levski Sofia							
7 Jan	20:30	Tectum Achel (Belgium)	3–0	(Austria) TSV Raiffeisen Hartberg	25–19	25–18	25–23			75–60	Report
8 Jan	19:00	Vojvodina Novi Sad (Serbia)	1–3	(Turkey) ON Hotels Alanya Bld	19–25	25–16	20–25	22–25		86–91	Report

=== 8th finals ===
Team 1	Agg.	Team 2	1st leg	2nd leg	Golden Set
CS Dinamo București (Romania)	3–3	(France) Alterna SPVB Poitiers	3–0	0–3	14–16
Olympiacos ONEX (Greece)	1–5	(Czech Republic) ČEZ Karlovarsko	1–3	2–3	
ON Hotels Alanya Bld (Turkey)	0–6	(Belgium) Greenyard Maaseik	1–3	0–3	
OK Alpacem Kanal (Slovenia)	0–6	(Turkey) Fenerbahçe	1–3	0–3	
Río Duero Soria (Spain)	0–6	(Italy) Gas Sales Bluenergy Piacenza	1–3	1–3	
VfB Friedrichshafen (Germany)	3–3	(Belgium) Tectum Achel	1–3	3–0	15–8
Orion Stars Doetinchem (Netherlands)	6–0	(Romania) CSM Corona Brașov	3–0	3–0	
Akaa Volley (Finland)	0–6	(Poland) Jastrzębski Węgiel	1–3	0–3	

==== First leg ====
Date	Time		Score		Set 1	Set 2	Set 3	Set 4	Set 5	Total	Report
20 Jan	18:30	CS Dinamo București (Romania)	3–0	(France) Alterna SPVB Poitiers	25–21	25–20	25–23			75–64	Report
21 Jan	19:00	Olympiacos ONEX (Greece)	1–3	(Czech Republic) ČEZ Karlovarsko	24–26	22–25	29–27	20–25		95–103	Report
21 Jan	19:00	ON Hotels Alanya Bld (Turkey)	1–3	(Belgium) Greenyard Maaseik	25–23	17–25	18–25	20–25		80–98	Report
21 Jan	19:00	OK Alpacem Kanal (Slovenia)	1–3	(Turkey) Fenerbahçe	25–22	19–25	23–25	19–25		86–97	Report
21 Jan	19:30	Río Duero Soria (Spain)	1–3	(Italy) Gas Sales Bluenergy Piacenza	20–25	20–25	25–23	17–25		82–98	Report
21 Jan	20:00	VfB Friedrichshafen (Germany)	1–3	(Belgium) Tectum Achel	21–25	25–20	22–25	23–25		91–95	Report
21 Jan	20:00	Orion Stars Doetinchem (Netherlands)	3–0	(Romania) CSM Corona Brașov	25–20	25–22	27–25			77–67	Report
22 Jan	18:30	Akaa Volley (Finland)	1–3	(Poland) Jastrzębski Węgiel	16–25	22–25	26–24	18–25		82–99	Report

==== Second leg ====
Date	Time		Score		Set 1	Set 2	Set 3	Set 4	Set 5	Total	Report
27 Jan	20:00	Alterna SPVB Poitiers (France)	3–0	(Romania) CS Dinamo București	25–22	25–16	25–12			75–50	Report
Golden set		Alterna SPVB Poitiers (France)	16–14	(Romania) CS Dinamo București							
27 Jan	20:30	Tectum Achel (Belgium)	0–3	(Germany) VfB Friedrichshafen	19–25	19–25	20–25			58–75	Report
Golden set		Tectum Achel (Belgium)	8–15	(Germany) VfB Friedrichshafen							
28 Jan	18:00	ČEZ Karlovarsko (Czech Republic)	3–2	(Greece) Olympiacos ONEX	17–25	25–21	24–26	25–17	15–9	106–98	Report
28 Jan	19:00	CSM Corona Brașov (Romania)	0–3	(Netherlands) Orion Stars Doetinchem	31–33	23–25	23–25			77–83	Report
28 Jan	19:00	Fenerbahçe (Turkey)	3–0	(Slovenia) OK Alpacem Kanal	25–19	25–21	25–18			75–58	Report
28 Jan	20:30	Greenyard Maaseik (Belgium)	3–0	(Turkey) ON Hotels Alanya Bld	25–18	26–24	25–20			76–62	Report
28 Jan	20:30	Gas Sales Bluenergy Piacenza (Italy)	3–1	(Spain) Río Duero Soria	25–20	25–20	27–29	25–19		102–88	Report
29 Jan	18:00	Jastrzębski Węgiel (Poland)	3–0	(Finland) Akaa Volley	25–22	25–16	25–21			75–59	Report

=== Playoffs ===
Team 1	Agg.	Team 2	1st leg	2nd leg	Golden Set
Jastrzębski Węgiel (Poland)	0–6	(Italy) Gas Sales Bluenergy Piacenza	1–3	1–3	
ČEZ Karlovarsko (Czech Republic)	2–4	(Belgium) Greenyard Maaseik	3–2	1–3	
VfB Friedrichshafen (Germany)	0–6	(France) Alterna SPVB Poitiers	1–3	0–3	
Orion Stars Doetinchem (Netherlands)	0–6	(Turkey) Fenerbahçe	1–3	0–3	

==== First leg ====
Date	Time		Score		Set 1	Set 2	Set 3	Set 4	Set 5	Total	Report
10 Feb	20:30	Jastrzębski Węgiel (Poland)	1–3	(Italy) Gas Sales Bluenergy Piacenza	25–23	21–25	23–25	14–25		83–98	Report
11 Feb	18:00	ČEZ Karlovarsko (Czech Republic)	3–2	(Belgium) Greenyard Maaseik	21–25	25–22	21–25	25–19	17–15	109–106	Report
11 Feb	19:00	VfB Friedrichshafen (Germany)	1–3	(France) Alterna SPVB Poitiers	23–25	17–25	25–21	18–25		83–96	Report
11 Feb	20:00	Orion Stars Doetinchem (Netherlands)	1–3	(Turkey) Fenerbahçe	25–18	21–25	13–25	24–26		83–94	Report

==== Second leg ====
Date	Time		Score		Set 1	Set 2	Set 3	Set 4	Set 5	Total	Report
18 Feb	20:00	Alterna SPVB Poitiers (France)	3–0	(Germany) VfB Friedrichshafen	25–14	25–18	25–21			75–53	Report
18 Feb	20:30	Greenyard Maaseik (Belgium)	3–1	(Czech Republic) ČEZ Karlovarsko	25–23	25–22	26–28	25–19		101–92	Report
18 Feb	20:30	Gas Sales Bluenergy Piacenza (Italy)	3–1	(Poland) Jastrzębski Węgiel	25–20	25–18	18–25	25–22		93–85	Report
19 Feb	19:00	Fenerbahçe (Turkey)	3–0	(Netherlands) Orion Stars Doetinchem	25–15	25–21	25–22			75–58	Report

=== 4th finals ===
Team 1	Agg.	Team 2	1st leg	2nd leg	Golden Set
Galatasaray HDI (Turkey)	1–5	(Belgium) Greenyard Maaseik	2–3	1–3	
SVG Lüneburg (Germany)	6–0	(France) Alterna SPVB Poitiers	3–1	3–1	
Berlin Recycling Volleys (Germany)	0–6	(Italy) Gas Sales Bluenergy Piacenza	0–3	0–3	
ACH Volley Ljubljana (Slovenia)	5–1	(Turkey) Fenerbahçe	3–2	3–1	

==== First leg ====
Date	Time		Score		Set 1	Set 2	Set 3	Set 4	Set 5	Total	Report
4 Mar	19:00	SVG Lüneburg (Germany)	3–1	(France) Alterna SPVB Poitiers	25–23	25–22	22–25	25–14		97–84	Report
4 Mar	19:30	Berlin Recycling Volleys (Germany)	0–3	(Italy) Gas Sales Bluenergy Piacenza	17–25	14–25	18–25			49–75	Report
5 Mar	20:00	Galatasaray HDI (Turkey)	2–3	(Belgium) Greenyard Maaseik	23–25	26–24	23–25	25–23	11–15	108–112	Report
5 Mar	20:00	ACH Volley Ljubljana (Slovenia)	3–2	(Turkey) Fenerbahçe	25–17	21–25	25–16	23–25	16–14	110–97	Report

==== Second leg ====
Date	Time		Score		Set 1	Set 2	Set 3	Set 4	Set 5	Total	Report
10 Mar	20:00	Alterna SPVB Poitiers (France)	1–3	(Germany) SVG Lüneburg	27–29	25–19	24–26	24–26		100–100	Report
11 Mar	19:30	Gas Sales Bluenergy Piacenza (Italy)	3–0	(Germany) Berlin Recycling Volleys	25–21	29–27	25–18			79–66	Report
11 Mar	20:30	Greenyard Maaseik (Belgium)	3–1	(Turkey) Galatasaray HDI	21–25	25–14	25–12	37–35		108–86	Report
12 Mar	19:00	Fenerbahçe (Turkey)	1–3	(Slovenia) ACH Volley Ljubljana	25–19	19–25	21–25	16–25		81–94	Report

== Final phase ==
=== Semifinals ===
Team 1	Agg.	Team 2	1st leg	2nd leg	Golden Set
Greenyard Maaseik (Belgium)	1–5	(Germany) SVG Lüneburg	1–3	2–3	
Gas Sales Bluenergy Piacenza (Italy)	5–1	(Slovenia) ACH Volley Ljubljana	3–2	3–1	

==== First leg ====
Date	Time		Score		Set 1	Set 2	Set 3	Set 4	Set 5	Total	Report
25 Mar	20:30	Greenyard Maaseik (Belgium)	1–3	(Germany) SVG Lüneburg	25–15	20–25	22–25	24–26		91–91	Report
25 Mar	20:30	Gas Sales Bluenergy Piacenza (Italy)	3–2	(Slovenia) ACH Volley Ljubljana	30–28	25–20	27–29	20–25	15–4	117–106	Report

==== Second leg ====
Date	Time		Score		Set 1	Set 2	Set 3	Set 4	Set 5	Total	Report
2 Apr	19:00	SVG Lüneburg (Germany)	3–2	(Belgium) Greenyard Maaseik	27–25	28–26	23–25	23–25	16–14	117–115	Report
2 Apr	20:00	ACH Volley Ljubljana (Slovenia)	1–3	(Italy) Gas Sales Bluenergy Piacenza	19–25	22–25	25–13	22–25		88–88	Report

=== Finals ===
Team 1	Agg.	Team 2	1st leg	2nd leg	Golden Set
SVG Lüneburg (Germany)	0–6	(Italy) Gas Sales Bluenergy Piacenza	0–3	0–3	

==== First leg ====
Date	Time		Score		Set 1	Set 2	Set 3	Set 4	Set 5	Total	Report
15 Apr	19:00	SVG Lüneburg (Germany)	0–3	(Italy) Gas Sales Bluenergy Piacenza	24–26	22–25	16–25			62–76	Report

==== Second leg ====
Date	Time		Score		Set 1	Set 2	Set 3	Set 4	Set 5	Total	Report
22 Apr	20:00	Gas Sales Bluenergy Piacenza (Italy)	3–0	(Germany) SVG Lüneburg	25–20	25–17	25–21			75–58	Report

== Final standings ==
Rank	Team
1st place, gold medalist(s)	(Italy) Gas Sales Bluenergy Piacenza
2nd place, silver medalist(s)	(Germany) SVG Lüneburg
Semifinalists	(Belgium) Greenyard Maaseik (Slovenia) ACH Volley Ljubljana

== See also ==
- 2025–26 CEV Champions League
- 2025–26 CEV Challenge Cup
- 2025–26 CEV Women's Champions League
- 2025–26 Women's CEV Cup
- 2025–26 CEV Women's Challenge Cup
