= 2024–25 CEV Challenge Cup =

Volleyball club tournament

CEV Challenge Cup
- 2024–25

Tournament information
- Sport: Volleyball
- Dates: 8 October 2024–19 March 2025
- Website: Challenge Cup

Final positions
- Champions: (Poland) Bogdanka LUK Lublin
- Runner-up: (Italy) Cucine Lube Civitanova

The 2024–25 CEV Challenge Cup was the 45th edition of the third tier European volleyball club competition organised by the European Volleyball Confederation.

== Format ==
Qualification round (Home and away matches):

- 32nd finals

Main phase (Home and away matches):

- 16th finals → 8th finals → Quarter-finals

Final phase (Home and away matches):

- Semi-finals → Finals

Aggregate score is counted as follows: 3 points for 3–0 or 3–1 win, 2 points for 3–2 win, 1 point for 2–3 loss.
In case the teams are tied after two legs, a Golden Set is played immediately at the completion of the second leg.

== Teams ==
Rankings	Country	Number of teams	Teams
1	Austria	1	UVC Holding Graz
2	Belgium	1	Decospan VT Menen
3	Bulgaria	2	Deya Volley Burgas
3	Bulgaria	2	CSKA Sofia
4	Croatia	3	MOK Mursa Osijek
4	Croatia	3	OK Međimurje Centrometal
4	Croatia	3	Ribola Kaštela
5	Czech Republic	2	VK Karlovarsko
5	Czech Republic	2	Kladno volejbal cz
6	Estonia	2	Pärnu VK
6	Estonia	2	Tartu Bigbank
7	Faroe Islands	1	Mjølnir Klaksvík
8	Finland	1	Akaa-Volley
9	France	1	Tourcoing Lille Métropole
10	Germany	1	WWK Volleys Herrsching
11	Greece	3	AOP Kifisias Athens
11	Greece	3	Panathinaikos
11	Greece	3	PAOK Thessaloniki
12	Hungary	1	MÁV Előre SC Székesfehérvár
13	Italy	1	Cucine Lube Civitanova
14	Iceland	1	Hamar Hveragerði
15	Israel	1	Maccabi Tel Aviv
16	Luxembourg	3	Volley Bartreng
16	Luxembourg	3	VC Stroossen
16	Luxembourg	3	VC Lorentzweiler
17	Netherlands	2	Numidia VC Limax Linne
17	Netherlands	2	Lycurgus Groningen
18	Norway	1	BK Tromsø
19	Poland	1	Bogdanka LUK Lublin
20	Portugal	2	Sporting CP
20	Portugal	2	Fonte Bastardo Azores
21	Romania	2	SCM Zalău
21	Romania	2	Dinamo București
22	Serbia	1	Karađorđe Topola
23	Slovakia	2	TJ Spartak Myjava
23	Slovakia	2	Rieker UJS Komárno
24	Slovenia	1	Panvita Pomgrad Murska Sobota
25	Spain	4	CV Melilla MSC
25	Spain	4	CV San Roque Las Palmas
25	Spain	4	Cisneros Alter Tenerife
25	Spain	4	Río Duero Soria
26	Switzerland	2	Chênois Geneve
26	Switzerland	2	Volley Näfels
27	Turkey	2	Ziraat Bankkart
27	Turkey	2	Spor Toto
28	Ukraine	3	VC Epicentr-Podolyany
28	Ukraine	3	VC Reshetylivka
28	Ukraine	3	VC Zhytychi-Polissya Zhytomyr
29	Balkan Cup Winner	1	(Turkey) Arkas Spor

== Draw ==
The draw was held on 16 July 2024 in Luxembourg.

== 32nd finals ==
Team 1	Agg.	Team 2	1st leg	2nd leg	Golden Set
CV Melilla MSC (Spain)	6–0	(Slovakia) TJ Spartak Myjava	3–0	3–0	
Volley Bartreng (Luxembourg)	1–3	(Israel) Maccabi Tel Aviv (Note: The tie was decided by one game only.)	1–3	–	
Numidia VC Limax Linne (Netherlands)	6–0	(Iceland) Hamar Hveragerði	3–0	3–1	
MOK Mursa Osijek (Croatia)	0–6	(Czech Republic) VK Karlovarsko	0–3	0–3	
Pärnu VK (Estonia)	0–6	(Ukraine) VC Epicentr-Podolyany	0–3	1–3	
Arkas Spor (Turkey)	0–6	(Finland) Akaa-Volley	1–3	0–3	
Rieker UJS Komárno (Slovakia)	5–1	(Luxembourg) VC Stroossen	3–1	3–2	
Neftochimik Burgas (Bulgaria)	6–0	(Greece) AOP Kifisias Athens	3–0	3–1	
Sporting CP (Portugal)	6–0	(Romania) SCM Zalău	3–1	3–1	
OK Međimurje Centrometal (Croatia)	1–5	(Hungary) MÁV Előre SC Székesfehérvár	2–3	0–3	
Panathinaikos (Greece)	6–0	(Switzerland) Chênois Geneve	3–0	3–0	
CV San Roque Las Palmas (Spain)	6–0	(Norway) BK Tromsø	3–0	3–0	
Cisneros Alter Tenerife (Spain)	3–3	(Spain) Río Duero Soria	3–1	0–3	18–16
VC Lorentzweiler (Luxembourg)	4–2	(Croatia) Ribola Kaštela	2–3	3–0	
VC Reshetylivka (Ukraine)	6–0	(Faroe Islands) Mjølnir Klaksvík	3–1	3–0	
Tartu Bigbank (Estonia)	6–0	(Ukraine) VC Zhytychi-Polissya Zhytomyr	3–0	3–1	

=== Matches ===
All times are local.

Date	Time		Score		Set 1	Set 2	Set 3	Set 4	Set 5	Total	Report
First leg
8 Oct	19:00	CV Melilla MSC (Spain)	3–0	(Slovakia) TJ Spartak Myjava	25–19	25–17	25–23			75–59	P2 Report
8 Oct	19:30	Volley Bartreng (Luxembourg)	1–3	(Israel) Maccabi Tel Aviv	26–24	16–25	14–25	15–25		71–99	P2 Report
8 Oct	20:00	Numidia VC Limax Linne (Netherlands)	3–0	(Iceland) Hamar Hveragerði	25–20	25–10	25–22			75–52	P2 Report
8 Oct	20:00	CV San Roque Las Palmas (Spain)	3–0	(Norway) BK Tromsø	25–23	25–23	25–17			75–63	P2 Report
9 Oct	18:00	MOK Mursa Osijek (Croatia)	0–3	(Czech Republic) VK Karlovarsko	15–25	18–25	22–25			55–75	P2 Report
9 Oct	19:00	Pärnu VK (Estonia)	0–3	(Ukraine) VC Epicentr-Podolyany	24–26	22–25	20–25			66–76	P2 Report
9 Oct	19:00	Arkas Spor (Turkey)	1–3	(Finland) Akaa-Volley	25–23	21–25	20–25	18–25		84–98	P2 Report
9 Oct	19:00	Neftochimik Burgas (Bulgaria)	3–0	(Greece) AOP Kifisias Athens	25–18	25–17	25–19			75–54	P2 Report
9 Oct	19:00	Rieker UJS Komárno (Slovakia)	3–1	(Luxembourg) VC Stroossen	25–21	25–22	27–29	25–20		102–92	P2 Report
9 Oct	20:30	Panathinaikos (Greece)	3–0	(Switzerland) Chênois Geneve	25–21	25–20	25–20			75–61	P2 Report
9 Oct	20:00	OK Međimurje Centrometal (Croatia)	2–3	(Hungary) MÁV Előre SC Székesfehérvár	25–16	22–25	23–25	25–22	11–15	106–103	P2 Report
9 Oct	19:30	Sporting CP (Portugal)	3–1	(Romania) SCM Zalău	22–25	25–22	25–19	25–22		97–88	P2 Report
10 Oct	19:30	VC Lorentzweiler (Luxembourg)	2–3	(Croatia) Ribola Kaštela	25–22	22–25	25–22	19–25	8–16	99–110	P2 Report
10 Oct	19:00	Cisneros Alter Tenerife (Spain)	3–1	(Spain) Río Duero Soria	17–25	25–21	25–22	25–16		92–84	P2 Report
16 Oct	19:00	Tartu Bigbank (Estonia)	3–0	(Ukraine) VC Zhytychi-Polissya Zhytomyr	29–27	25–23	25–15			79–65	P2 Report
16 Oct	19:00	VC Reshetylivka (Ukraine)	3–1	(Faroe Islands) Mjølnir Klaksvík	22–25	25–19	25–13	25–17		97–74	P2 Report
Second leg
9 Oct	20:00	BK Tromsø (Norway)	0–3	(Spain) CV San Roque Las Palmas	17–25	19–25	19–25			55–75	P2 Report
15 Oct	18:30	Akaa-Volley (Finland)	3–0	(Turkey) Arkas Spor	25–23	28–26	25–16			78–65	P2 Report
15 Oct	19:00	Ribola Kaštela (Croatia)	0–3	(Luxembourg) VC Lorentzweiler	21–25	16–25	28–30			65–80	P2 Report
16 Oct	18:00	SCM Zalău (Romania)	1–3	(Portugal) Sporting CP	27–25	20–25	23–25	22–25		92–100	P2 Report
16 Oct	17:30	MÁV Előre SC Székesfehérvár (Hungary)	3–0	(Croatia)	25–13	25–22	29–27			79–62	P2 Report
16 Oct	18:00	VC Epicentr-Podolyany (Ukraine)	3–1	(Estonia) Pärnu VK	22–25	25–15	25–22	25–21		97–83	P2 Report
16 Oct	18:00	VK Karlovarsko (Czech Republic)	3–0	(Croatia) MOK Mursa Osijek	25–20	25–21	27–25			77–66	P2 Report
16 Oct	19:00	AOP Kifisias Athens (Greece)	1–3	(Bulgaria) Neftochimik Burgas	23–25	25–21	21–25	20–25		89–96	P2 Report
16 Oct	19:30	TJ Spartak Myjava (Slovakia)	0–3	(Spain) CV Melilla MSC	22–25	21–25	20–25			63–75	P2 Report
16 Oct	19:30	Río Duero Soria (Spain)	3–0	(Spain) Cisneros Alter Tenerife	25–19	25–18	25–19			75–56	P2 Report
Golden set		Río Duero Soria (Spain)	16–18	(Spain) Cisneros Alter Tenerife							
16 Oct	19:30	VC Stroossen (Luxembourg)	2–3	(Slovakia) Rieker UJS Komárno	21–25	15–25	25–18	31–29	7–15	99–112	P2 Report
16 Oct	20:00	Chênois Geneve (Switzerland)	0–3	(Greece) Panathinaikos	18–25	21–25	12–25			51–75	P2 Report
16 Oct	19:00	Hamar Hveragerði (Iceland)	1–3	(Netherlands) Numidia VC Limax Linne	22–25	20–25	25–23	23–25		90–98	P2 Report
17 Oct	19:00	VC Zhytychi-Polissya Zhytomyr (Ukraine)	1–3	(Estonia) Tartu Bigbank	21–25	18–25	25–21	20–25		84–96	P2 Report
17 Oct	19:00	Mjølnir Klaksvík (Faroe Islands)	0–3	(Ukraine) VC Reshetylivka	13–25	20–25	21–25			54–75	P2 Report

== 16th finals ==
Team 1	Agg.	Team 2	1st leg	2nd leg	Golden Set
CV Melilla MSC (Spain)	5–1	(Portugal) Fonte Bastardo Azores	3–1	3–2	
Maccabi Tel Aviv (Israel)	0–6	(Poland) Bogdanka LUK Lublin	0–3	0–3	
Numidia VC Limax Linne (Netherlands)	1–5	(Romania) Dinamo București	2–3	1–3	
VK Karlovarsko (Czech Republic)	0–6	(Italy) Cucine Lube Civitanova	0–3	0–3	
VC Epicentr-Podolyany (Ukraine)	3–3	(Bulgaria) CSKA Sofia	1–3	3–1	15–17
Akaa-Volley (Finland)	6–0	(Slovenia) Panvita Pomgrad Murska Sobota	3–0	3–0	
Rieker UJS Komárno (Slovakia)	2–4	(Switzerland) Volley Näfels	2–3	2–3	
Neftochimik Burgas (Bulgaria)	0–6	(Turkey) Spor Toto	0–3	1–3	
Sporting CP (Portugal)	5–1	(Czech Republic) Kladno volejbal cz	3–0	3–2	
MÁV Előre SC Székesfehérvár (Hungary)	5–1	(Austria) UVC Holding Graz	3–2	3–0	
Panathinaikos (Greece)	2–4	(France) Tourcoing Lille Métropole	2–3	2–3	
CV San Roque Las Palmas (Spain)	1–5	(Greece) PAOK Thessaloniki	2–3	0–3	
Cisneros Alter Tenerife (Spain)	2–4	(Germany) WWK Volleys Herrsching	3–2	1–3	
VC Lorentzweiler (Luxembourg)	0–6	(Netherlands) Lycurgus Groningen	1–3	0–3	
VC Reshetylivka (Ukraine)	0–6	(Belgium) Decospan VT Menen	0–3	0–3	
Tartu Bigbank (Estonia)	3–3	(Serbia) Karađorđe Topola	3–0	1–3	15–17

=== Matches ===
All times are local.

Date	Time		Score		Set 1	Set 2	Set 3	Set 4	Set 5	Total	Report
First leg
12 Nov	16:00	MÁV Előre SC Székesfehérvár (Hungary)	3–2	(Austria) UVC Holding Graz	22–25	25–23	20–25	25–23	15–13	107–109	P2 Report
12 Nov	19:00	Tartu Bigbank (Estonia)	3–0	(Serbia) Karađorđe Topola	25–18	25–19	25–21			75–58	P2 Report
12 Nov	19:00	Neftochimik Burgas (Bulgaria)	0–3	(Turkey) Spor Toto	20–25	24–26	18–25			62–76	P2 Report
12 Nov	19:00	Rieker UJS Komárno (Slovakia)	2–3	(Switzerland) Volley Näfels	29–31	25–23	25–15	21–25	11–15	111–109	P2 Report
12 Nov	19:00	CV Melilla MSC (Spain)	3–1	(Portugal) Fonte Bastardo Azores	25–20	22–25	25–19	26–24		98–88	P2 Report
12 Nov	19:30	VC Lorentzweiler (Luxembourg)	1–3	(Netherlands) Lycurgus Groningen	19–25	25–22	27–29	22–25		93–101	P2 Report
12 Nov	19:00	Cisneros Alter Tenerife (Spain)	3–2	(Germany) WWK Volleys Herrsching	25–23	20–25	25–19	16–25	15–12	101–104	P2 Report
12 Nov	20:30	VC Reshetylivka (Ukraine)	0–3	(Belgium) Decospan VT Menen	27–29	17–25	21–25			65–79	P2
12 Nov	19:30	Sporting CP (Portugal)	3–0	(Czech Republic) Kladno volejbal cz	25–20	25–21	25–15			75–56	P2 Report
13 Nov	18:00	Panathinaikos (Greece)	2–3	(France) Tourcoing Lille Métropole	25–20	22–25	23–25	28–26	12–15	110–111	P2 Report
13 Nov	18:30	Akaa-Volley (Finland)	3–0	(Slovenia) Panvita Pomgrad Murska Sobota	25–19	25–16	25–20			75–55	P2 Report
13 Nov	19:00	CV San Roque Las Palmas (Spain)	2–3	(Greece) PAOK Thessaloniki	25–27	20–25	25–14	26–24	11–15	107–105	P2 Report
13 Nov	20:00	Numidia VC Limax Linne (Netherlands)	2–3	(Romania) Dinamo București	27–25	18–25	20–25	25–15	17–19	107–109	P2 Report
14 Nov	18:00	VK Karlovarsko (Czech Republic)	0–3	(Italy) Cucine Lube Civitanova	16–25	18–25	14–25			48–75	P2 Report
18 Nov	18:00	VC Epicentr-Podolyany (Ukraine)	1–3	(Bulgaria) CSKA Sofia	25–22	20–25	23–25	23–25		91–97	P2 Report
19 Nov	18:00	Bogdanka LUK Lublin (Poland)	3–0	(Israel) Maccabi Tel Aviv	25–16	25–11	25–20			75–47	P2 Report
Second leg
13 Nov	20:30	Decospan VT Menen (Belgium)	3–0	(Ukraine) VC Reshetylivka	25–20	25–20	25–22			75–62	P2 Report
19 Nov	18:00	CSKA Sofia (Bulgaria)	1–3	(Ukraine) VC Epicentr-Podolyany	22–25	25–23	20–25	18–25		85–98	P2 Report
Golden set		CSKA Sofia (Bulgaria)	17–15	(Ukraine) VC Epicentr-Podolyany							
19 Nov	19:00	Karađorđe Topola (Serbia)	3–1	(Estonia) Tartu Bigbank	26–24	20–25	25–15	25–23		96–87	P2 Report
Golden set		Karađorđe Topola (Serbia)	17–15	(Estonia) Tartu Bigbank							
19 Nov	19:30	Lycurgus Groningen (Netherlands)	3–0	(Luxembourg) VC Lorentzweiler	25–18	25–17	27–25			77–60	P2 Report
19 Nov	20:00	Tourcoing Lille Métropole (France)	3–2	(Greece) Panathinaikos	23–25	22–25	25–19	25–20	15–13	110–102	P2 Report
19 Nov	20:00	WWK Volleys Herrsching (Germany)	3–1	(Spain) Cisneros Alter Tenerife	25–23	25–15	24–26	25–23		99–87	P2 Report
19 Nov	20:30	Fonte Bastardo Azores (Portugal)	2–3	(Spain) CV Melilla MSC	24–26	25–27	25–18	25–21	13–15	112–107	P2 Report
20 Nov	18:00	Maccabi Tel Aviv (Israel)	0–3	(Poland) Bogdanka LUK Lublin	11–25	16–25	19–25			46–75	P2 Report
20 Nov	19:00	Dinamo București (Romania)	3–1	(Netherlands) Numidia VC Limax Linne	25–16	18–25	25–13	25–19		93–73	P2 Report
20 Nov	19:00	PAOK Thessaloniki (Greece)	3–0	(Spain) CV San Roque Las Palmas	25–17	25–22	25–22			75–61	P2 Report
20 Nov	19:00	Panvita Pomgrad Murska Sobota (Slovenia)	0–3	(Finland) Akaa-Volley	17–25	19–25	22–25			58–75	P2 Report
20 Nov	19:00	UVC Holding Graz (Austria)	0–3	(Hungary) MÁV Előre SC Székesfehérvár	22–25	23–25	20–25			65–75	P2 Report
20 Nov	20:30	Cucine Lube Civitanova (Italy)	3–0	(Czech Republic) VK Karlovarsko	25–19	25–9	25–17			75–45	P2 Report
21 Nov	17:00	Spor Toto (Turkey)	3–1	(Bulgaria) Neftochimik Burgas	25–19	25–23	20–25	25–17		95–84	P2 Report
21 Nov	18:00	Kladno volejbal cz (Czech Republic)	2–3	(Portugal) Sporting CP	21–25	25–18	18–25	28–26	9–15	101–109	P2 Report
21 Nov	19:00	Volley Näfels (Switzerland)	3–2	(Slovakia) Rieker UJS Komárno	21–25	25–19	20–25	27–25	15–13	108–107	P2 Report

== 8th finals ==
Team 1	Agg.	Team 2	1st leg	2nd leg
CV Melilla MSC (Spain)	6–0	(Switzerland) Volley Näfels	3–1	3–1
MÁV Előre SC Székesfehérvár (Hungary)	1–5	(Greece) PAOK Thessaloniki	2–3	1–3
CSKA Sofia (Bulgaria)	2–4	(Belgium) Decospan VT Menen	2–3	2–3
Bogdanka LUK Lublin (Poland)	6–0	(France) Tourcoing Lille Métropole	3–1	3–1
Karađorđe Topola (Serbia)	0–6	(Italy) Cucine Lube Civitanova	0–3	1–3
Lycurgus Groningen (Netherlands)	4–2	(Romania) Dinamo București	3–0	2–3
Akaa-Volley (Finland)	0–6	(Portugal) Sporting CP	1–3	0–3
WWK Volleys Herrsching (Germany)	1–5	(Turkey) Spor Toto	1–3	2–3

=== Matches ===
All times are local.

Date	Time		Score		Set 1	Set 2	Set 3	Set 4	Set 5	Total	Report
First leg
3 Dec	18:00	CV Melilla MSC (Spain)	3–1	(Switzerland) Volley Näfels	25–18	23–25	25–16	25–22		98–81	P2 Report
3 Dec	18:00	MÁV Előre SC Székesfehérvár (Hungary)	2–3	(Greece) PAOK Thessaloniki	25–22	17–25	25–15	21–25	13–15	101–102	P2 Report
3 Dec	19:30	CSKA Sofia (Bulgaria)	2–3	(Belgium) Decospan VT Menen	28–26	27–29	25–18	21–25	10–15	111–113	P2 Report
3 Dec	20:30	Bogdanka LUK Lublin (Poland)	3–1	(France) Tourcoing Lille Métropole	21–25	25–18	25–19	25–16		96–78	P2 Report
4 Dec	19:00	Karađorđe Topola (Serbia)	0–3	(Italy) Cucine Lube Civitanova	18–25	20–25	16–25			54–75	P2 Report
4 Dec	19:30	Lycurgus Groningen (Netherlands)	3–0	(Romania) Dinamo București	25–19	25–17	25–22			75–58	P2 Report
5 Dec	18:30	Akaa-Volley (Finland)	1–3	(Portugal) Sporting CP	25–21	22–25	23–25	21–25		91–96	P2 Report
5 Dec	19:30	WWK Volleys Herrsching (Germany)	1–3	(Turkey) Spor Toto	19–25	25–23	17–25	21–25		82–98	P2 Report
Second leg
17 Dec	19:00	PAOK Thessaloniki (Greece)	3–1	(Hungary) MÁV Előre SC Székesfehérvár	32–30	23–25	25–16	25–19		105–90	P2 Report
17 Dec	20:00	Dinamo București (Romania)	3–2	(Netherlands) Lycurgus Groningen	17–25	16–25	28–26	25–18	15–8	101–102	P2 Report
17 Dec	20:00	Decospan VT Menen (Belgium)	3–2	(Bulgaria) CSKA Sofia	25–20	25–10	28–30	19–25	22–20	119–105	P2 Report
17 Dec	20:00	Tourcoing Lille Métropole (France)	1–3	(Poland) Bogdanka LUK Lublin	16–25	25–22	21–25	19–25		81–97	P2 Report
18 Dec	14:00	Spor Toto (Turkey)	3–2	(Germany) WWK Volleys Herrsching	25–19	22–25	27–29	25–15	15–7	114–95	P2 Report
18 Dec	19:00	Volley Näfels (Switzerland)	1–3	(Spain) CV Melilla MSC	21–25	19–25	25–16	15–25		80–91	P2 Report
19 Dec	19:30	Sporting CP (Portugal)	3–0	(Finland) Akaa-Volley	25–22	25–16	25–21			75–59	P2 Report
19 Dec	20:30	Cucine Lube Civitanova (Italy)	3–1	(Serbia) Karađorđe Topola	25–22	25–18	21–25	15–9		86–74	P2 Report

== Quarter-finals ==
Team 1	Agg.	Team 2	1st leg	2nd leg
CV Melilla MSC (Spain)	0–6	(Poland) Bogdanka LUK Lublin	0–3	0–3
Lycurgus Groningen (Netherlands)	0–6	(Italy) Cucine Lube Civitanova	1–3	0–3
Decospan VT Menen (Belgium)	0–6	(Portugal) Sporting CP	0–3	1–3
PAOK Thessaloniki (Greece)	0–6	(Turkey) Spor Toto	1–3	0–3

=== Matches ===
All times are local.

Date	Time		Score		Set 1	Set 2	Set 3	Set 4	Set 5	Total	Report
First leg
15 Jan	18:30	CV Melilla MSC (Spain)	0–3	(Poland) Bogdanka LUK Lublin	19–25	23–25	21–25			63–75	P2 Report
15 Jan	19:30	Lycurgus Groningen (Netherlands)	1–3	(Italy) Cucine Lube Civitanova	21–25	25–23	18–25	27–29		91–102	P2 Report
15 Jan	20:00	Decospan VT Menen (Belgium)	0–3	(Portugal) Sporting CP	18–25	21–25	21–25			60–75	P2 Report
16 Jan	19:30	PAOK Thessaloniki (Greece)	1–3	(Turkey) Spor Toto	16–25	22–25	25–19	23–25		86–94	P2 Report
Second leg
28 Jan	18:00	Bogdanka LUK Lublin (Poland)	3–0	(Spain) CV Melilla MSC	25–19	25–15	25–20			75–54	P2 Report
29 Jan	16:00	Spor Toto (Turkey)	3–0	(Greece) PAOK Thessaloniki	25–19	25–14	25–23			75–56	P2 Report
29 Jan	18:00	Sporting CP (Portugal)	3–1	(Belgium) Decospan VT Menen	25–22	30–28	25–27	25–14		105–91	P2 Report
29 Jan	20:30	Cucine Lube Civitanova (Italy)	3–0	(Netherlands) Lycurgus Groningen	25–16	25–13	25–14			75–43	P2 Report

== Semi-finals ==
Team 1	Agg.	Team 2	1st leg	2nd leg
Sporting CP (Portugal)	0–6	(Poland) Bogdanka LUK Lublin	0–3	0–3
Cucine Lube Civitanova (Italy)	6–0	(Turkey) Spor Toto	3–0	3–0

=== Matches ===
All times are local.

Date	Time		Score		Set 1	Set 2	Set 3	Set 4	Set 5	Total	Report
First leg
12 Feb	19:30	Sporting CP (Portugal)	0–3	(Poland) Bogdanka LUK Lublin	18–25	21–25	18–25			57–75	P2 Report
13 Feb	20:30	Cucine Lube Civitanova (Italy)	3–0	(Turkey) Spor Toto	25–21	25–17	25–21			75–59	P2 Report
Second leg
25 Feb	16:00	Spor Toto (Turkey)	0–3	(Italy) Cucine Lube Civitanova	19–25	17–25	16–25			52–75	P2 Report
26 Feb	18:00	Bogdanka LUK Lublin (Poland)	3–0	(Portugal) Sporting CP	25–20	25–22	25–20			75–62	P2 Report

== Final ==
Team 1	Agg.	Team 2	1st leg	2nd leg
Bogdanka LUK Lublin (Poland)	4–2	(Italy) Cucine Lube Civitanova	3–1	2–3

=== Matches ===
All times are local.

Date	Time		Score		Set 1	Set 2	Set 3	Set 4	Set 5	Total	Report
First leg
12 Mar	20:30	Bogdanka LUK Lublin (Poland)	3–1	(Italy) Cucine Lube Civitanova	25–20	22–25	25–18	26–24		98–87	P2
Second leg
19 Mar	20:30	Cucine Lube Civitanova (Italy)	3–2	(Poland) Bogdanka LUK Lublin	27–25	25–21	36–38	20–25	15–7	123–116	P2

== See also ==
- 2024–25 CEV Champions League
- 2024–25 CEV Cup
- 2024–25 CEV Women's Champions League
- 2024–25 Women's CEV Cup
- 2024–25 CEV Women's Challenge Cup
