= 2024–25 CEV Champions League =

- League: CEV Champions League
- Sport: Volleyball
- Duration: Qualifying round: 17 September – 23 October 2024; Main tournament: 12 November 2024 – 18 May 2025
- Teams: 34 (16 qual. + 18 main tourn.)

Finals
- Venue: (Poland) Łódź
- Champions: (Italy) Sir Sicoma Monini Perugia
- Finals MVP: (Italy) Simone Giannelli

CEV Champions League seasons
- ← 2023–24 2025–26 →

The 2024–25 CEV Champions League was the 66th edition of the highest level European volleyball club competition organised by the European Volleyball Confederation.

== Qualification ==
Rank	Country	Number of teams			Qualified teams
Rank	Country	Vac	Qual	Total	Qualified teams
1	Italy	3	–	3	Sir Sicoma Monini Perugia
1	Italy	3	–	3	Mint Vero Volley Monza
1	Italy	3	–	3	Allianz Milano
2	Poland	3	–	3	Jastrzębski Węgiel
2	Poland	3	–	3	Aluron CMC Warta Zawiercie
2	Poland	3	–	3	PGE Projekt Warsaw
4	Germany	3	–	3	Berlin Recycling Volleys
4	Germany	3	–	3	SVG Lüneburg
4	Germany	3	–	3	Helios Grizzlys Giesen
5	Turkey	2	–	2	Halkbank Ankara
5	Turkey	2	–	2	Fenerbahçe Medicana İstanbul
6	Belgium	2	–	2	Knack Roeselare
6	Belgium	2	–	2	Greenyard Maaseik
7	France	2	–	2	Saint-Nazaire VB Atlantique
7	France	2	–	2	Chaumont VB 52
8	Bulgaria	1	–	1	Levski Sofia
9	Czech Republic	1	–	1	Jihostroj České Budějovice
10	Slovenia	1	–	1	ACH Volley Ljubljana
17	Austria	–	1	1	Hypo Tirol Innsbruck
20	Greece	–	1	1	Olympiacos ONEX

== Pools composition ==
The drawing of lots was held on 16 July 2024 in Luxembourg City.

Pool A	Pool B	Pool C
Berlin Recycling Volleys	Mint Vero Volley Monza	Aluron CMC Warta Zawiercie
PGE Projekt Warsaw	Helios Grizzlys Giesen	Allianz Milano
Greenyard Maaseik	Fenerbahçe Medicana İstanbul	Knack Roeselare
ACH Volley Ljubljana	(Greece) Olympiacos ONEX	(Austria) Hypo Tirol Innsbruck

Pool D	Pool E
Sir Sicoma Monini Perugia	Jastrzębski Węgiel
Halkbank Ankara	SVG Lüneburg
Saint-Nazaire VB Atlantique	Chaumont VB 52
Jihostroj České Budějovice	Levski Sofia

== League round ==
- The teams are split into 5 groups, each one featuring four teams.
- The top team in each pool automatically qualifies for the quarterfinals.
- All 2nd placed teams and the best 3rd placed team qualify for the playoffs.
- The remaining 3rd placed teams will compete in the quarterfinals of the 2024–25 CEV Cup.
- All times are local.

=== Pool standing procedure ===
1. Number of victories
2. Points
3. Set ratio
4. Setpoint ratio
5. H2H results

Result	Winners	Losers
3–0	3 points	0 points
3–1	3 points	0 points
3–2	2 points	1 point

=== Pool A ===
Pos	Team	Pld	W	L	Pts	SW	SL	SR	SPW	SPL	SPR	Qualification
1	(Poland) PGE Projekt Warsaw	6	6	0	18	18	2	9.000	497	393	1.265	Quarterfinals
2	(Germany) Berlin Recycling Volleys	6	4	2	12	13	8	1.625	499	467	1.069	Playoffs
3	(Slovenia) ACH Volley Ljubljana	6	1	5	4	7	15	0.467	477	531	0.898	2024–25 CEV Cup
4	(Belgium) Greenyard Maaseik	6	1	5	2	4	17	0.235	437	519	0.842	

Source: CEV

Date	Time		Score		Set 1	Set 2	Set 3	Set 4	Set 5	Total	Report
12 Nov	19:30	Berlin Recycling Volleys (Germany)	3–1	(Slovenia) ACH Volley Ljubljana	25–20	23–25	26–24	25–21		99–90	Report
12 Nov	20:30	PGE Projekt Warsaw (Poland)	3–0	(Belgium) Greenyard Maaseik	25–9	25–17	25–21			75–47	Report
20 Nov	20:30	Greenyard Maaseik (Belgium)	0–3	(Germany) Berlin Recycling Volleys	16–25	20–25	30–32			66–82	Report
21 Nov	18:00	ACH Volley Ljubljana (Slovenia)	1–3	(Poland) PGE Projekt Warsaw	21–25	19–25	26–24	17–25		83–99	Report
3 Dec	18:00	PGE Projekt Warsaw (Poland)	3–0	(Germany) Berlin Recycling Volleys	25–22	25–21	25–22			75–65	Report
4 Dec	18:00	ACH Volley Ljubljana (Slovenia)	2–3	(Belgium) Greenyard Maaseik	21–25	25–22	25–19	25–27	9–15	105–108	Report
17 Dec	20:30	PGE Projekt Warsaw (Poland)	3–0	(Slovenia) ACH Volley Ljubljana	25–23	25–13	25–17			75–53	Report
18 Dec	19:30	Berlin Recycling Volleys (Germany)	3–1	(Belgium) Greenyard Maaseik	25–12	21–25	25–22	25–19		96–78	Report
15 Jan	20:30	Greenyard Maaseik (Belgium)	0–3	(Poland) PGE Projekt Warsaw	19–25	22–25	23–25			64–75	Report
16 Jan	18:00	ACH Volley Ljubljana (Slovenia)	0–3	(Germany) Berlin Recycling Volleys	24–26	18–25	18–25			60–76	Report
29 Jan	20:00	Berlin Recycling Volleys (Germany)	1–3	(Poland) PGE Projekt Warsaw	25–23	17–25	18–25	21–25		81–98	Report
29 Jan	20:30	Greenyard Maaseik (Belgium)	0–3	(Slovenia) ACH Volley Ljubljana	17–25	32–34	25–27			74–86	Report

=== Pool B ===
Pos	Team	Pld	W	L	Pts	SW	SL	SR	SPW	SPL	SPR	Qualification
1	(Italy) Mint Vero Volley Monza	6	5	1	13	16	9	1.778	584	543	1.076	Quarterfinals
2	(Greece) Olympiacos ONEX	6	4	2	13	16	10	1.600	594	585	1.015	Playoffs
3	(Turkey) Fenerbahçe Medicana İstanbul	6	2	4	6	10	14	0.714	560	562	0.996	2024–25 CEV Cup
4	(Germany) Helios Grizzlys Giesen	6	1	5	4	7	16	0.438	507	555	0.914	

Source: CEV

Date	Time		Score		Set 1	Set 2	Set 3	Set 4	Set 5	Total	Report
13 Nov	20:00	Helios Grizzlys Giesen (Germany)	0–3	(Turkey) Fenerbahçe Medicana İstanbul	23–25	23–25	22–25			68–75	Report
14 Nov	20:00	Mint Vero Volley Monza (Italy)	3–2	(Greece) Olympiacos ONEX	20–25	25–20	26–28	25–23	15–8	111–104	Report
20 Nov	19:00	Fenerbahçe Medicana İstanbul (Turkey)	0–3	(Italy) Mint Vero Volley Monza	23–25	20–25	23–25			66–75	Report
20 Nov	19:30	Olympiacos ONEX (Greece)	3–1	(Germany) Helios Grizzlys Giesen	25–21	24–26	25–16	26–24		100–87	Report
3 Dec	18:30	Helios Grizzlys Giesen (Germany)	2–3	(Italy) Mint Vero Volley Monza	16–25	25–22	22–25	25–21	9–15	97–108	Report
5 Dec	19:00	Olympiacos ONEX (Greece)	2–3	(Turkey) Fenerbahçe Medicana İstanbul	25–16	14–25	19–25	37–35	8–15	103–116	Report
17 Dec	20:00	Mint Vero Volley Monza (Italy)	3–1	(Turkey) Fenerbahçe Medicana İstanbul	25–23	25–21	23–25	25–20		98–89	Report
18 Dec	20:00	Helios Grizzlys Giesen (Germany)	0–3	(Greece) Olympiacos ONEX	20–25	23–25	19–25			62–75	Report
15 Jan	19:00	Fenerbahçe Medicana İstanbul (Turkey)	1–3	(Germany) Helios Grizzlys Giesen	30–28	23–25	25–27	21–25		99–105	Report
16 Jan	19:00	Olympiacos ONEX (Greece)	3–1	(Italy) Mint Vero Volley Monza	26–24	26–24	22–25	25–21		99–94	Report
29 Jan	18:30	Mint Vero Volley Monza (Italy)	3–1	(Germany) Helios Grizzlys Giesen	23–25	25–22	25–19	25–22		98–88	Report
29 Jan	19:00	Fenerbahçe Medicana İstanbul (Turkey)	2–3	(Greece) Olympiacos ONEX	25–27	25–22	25–20	25–27	15–17	115–113	Report

=== Pool C ===
Pos	Team	Pld	W	L	Pts	SW	SL	SR	SPW	SPL	SPR	Qualification
1	(Poland) Aluron CMC Warta Zawiercie	6	6	0	17	18	2	9.000	484	401	1.207	Quarterfinals
2	(Italy) Allianz Milano	6	4	2	12	14	9	1.556	530	500	1.060	Playoffs
3	(Belgium) Knack Roeselare	6	2	4	6	8	14	0.571	474	496	0.956	2024–25 CEV Cup
4	(Austria) Hypo Tirol Innsbruck	6	0	6	1	3	18	0.167	435	526	0.827	

Source: CEV

Date	Time		Score		Set 1	Set 2	Set 3	Set 4	Set 5	Total	Report
13 Nov	18:00	Aluron CMC Warta Zawiercie (Poland)	3–0	(Austria) Hypo Tirol Innsbruck	25–21	25–19	25–16			75–56	Report
13 Nov	18:30	Allianz Milano (Italy)	3–2	(Belgium) Knack Roeselare	21–25	21–25	25–23	25–22	16–14	108–109	Report
20 Nov	18:00	Hypo Tirol Innsbruck (Austria)	1–3	(Italy) Allianz Milano	18–25	23–25	25–21	20–25		86–96	Report
21 Nov	20:30	Knack Roeselare (Belgium)	0–3	(Poland) Aluron CMC Warta Zawiercie	17–25	23–25	23–25			63–75	Report
3 Dec	20:45	Allianz Milano (Italy)	2–3	(Poland) Aluron CMC Warta Zawiercie	25–17	20–25	24–26	25–19	12–15	106–102	Report
4 Dec	18:00	Hypo Tirol Innsbruck (Austria)	2–3	(Belgium) Knack Roeselare	25–21	25–23	27–29	16–25	10–15	103–113	Report
18 Dec	18:00	Aluron CMC Warta Zawiercie (Poland)	3–0	(Belgium) Knack Roeselare	25–20	25–19	25–18			75–57	Report
18 Dec	19:30	Allianz Milano (Italy)	3–0	(Austria) Hypo Tirol Innsbruck	25–19	32–30	26–24			83–73	Report
14 Jan	18:00	Hypo Tirol Innsbruck (Austria)	0–3	(Poland) Aluron CMC Warta Zawiercie	30–32	13–25	14–25			57–82	Report
16 Jan	20:30	Knack Roeselare (Belgium)	0–3	(Italy) Allianz Milano	17–25	18–25	20–25			55–75	Report
29 Jan	18:00	Aluron CMC Warta Zawiercie (Poland)	3–0	(Italy) Allianz Milano	25–22	25–21	25–19			75–62	Report
29 Jan	20:30	Knack Roeselare (Belgium)	3–0	(Austria) Hypo Tirol Innsbruck	25–20	27–25	25–15			77–60	Report

=== Pool D ===
Pos	Team	Pld	W	L	Pts	SW	SL	SR	SPW	SPL	SPR	Qualification
1	(Italy) Sir Sicoma Monini Perugia	6	5	1	16	17	3	5.667	487	408	1.194	Quarterfinals
2	(Turkey) Halkbank Ankara	6	4	2	11	14	11	1.273	563	553	1.018	Playoffs
3	(France) Saint-Nazaire VB Atlantique	6	3	3	9	11	12	0.917	511	515	0.992	Playoffs
4	(Czech Republic) Jihostroj České Budějovice	6	0	6	0	2	18	0.111	407	492	0.827	

Source: CEV

Date	Time		Score		Set 1	Set 2	Set 3	Set 4	Set 5	Total	Report
13 Nov	18:00	Halkbank Ankara (Turkey)	2–3	(France) Saint-Nazaire VB Atlantique	22–25	30–28	25–18	20–25	24–26	121–122	Report
13 Nov	20:30	Sir Sicoma Monini Perugia (Italy)	3–0	(Czech Republic) Jihostroj České Budějovice	25–16	25–23	25–22			75–61	Report
19 Nov	20:00	Saint-Nazaire VB Atlantique (France)	0–3	(Italy) Sir Sicoma Monini Perugia	17–25	20–25	13–25			50–75	Report
20 Nov	18:00	Jihostroj České Budějovice (Czech Republic)	1–3	(Turkey) Halkbank Ankara	18–25	25–22	22–25	15–25		80–97	Report
4 Dec	18:00	Halkbank Ankara (Turkey)	0–3	(Italy) Sir Sicoma Monini Perugia	20–25	27–29	23–25			70–79	Report
4 Dec	18:00	Jihostroj České Budějovice (Czech Republic)	1–3	(France) Saint-Nazaire VB Atlantique	23–25	21–25	25–18	17–25		86–93	Report
18 Dec	18:00	Halkbank Ankara (Turkey)	3–0	(Czech Republic) Jihostroj České Budějovice	25–21	25–23	25–18			75–62	Report
19 Dec	20:00	Sir Sicoma Monini Perugia (Italy)	3–0	(France) Saint-Nazaire VB Atlantique	25–21	25–23	25–23			75–67	Report
15 Jan	19:00	Saint-Nazaire VB Atlantique (France)	2–3	(Turkey) Halkbank Ankara	20–25	25–18	25–20	23–25	11–15	104–103	Report
16 Jan	18:00	Jihostroj České Budějovice (Czech Republic)	0–3	(Italy) Sir Sicoma Monini Perugia	25–27	22–25	16–25			63–77	Report
29 Jan	19:00	Saint-Nazaire VB Atlantique (France)	3–0	(Czech Republic) Jihostroj České Budějovice	25–19	25–18	25–18			75–55	Report
29 Jan	20:45	Sir Sicoma Monini Perugia (Italy)	2–3	(Turkey) Halkbank Ankara	26–28	25–14	25–15	18–25	12–15	106–97	Report

=== Pool E ===
Pos	Team	Pld	W	L	Pts	SW	SL	SR	SPW	SPL	SPR	Qualification
1	(Poland) Jastrzębski Węgiel	6	6	0	17	18	4	4.500	544	464	1.172	Quarterfinals
2	(Germany) SVG Lüneburg	6	3	3	8	10	12	0.833	490	513	0.955	Playoffs
3	(France) Chaumont VB 52	6	2	4	8	11	12	0.917	524	522	1.004	2024–25 CEV Cup
4	(Bulgaria) Levski Sofia	6	1	5	3	6	17	0.353	493	552	0.893	

Source: CEV

Date	Time		Score		Set 1	Set 2	Set 3	Set 4	Set 5	Total	Report
13 Nov	19:00	SVG Lüneburg (Germany)	3–2	(France) Chaumont VB 52	17–25	23–25	26–24	25–19	15–13	106–106	Report
13 Nov	20:30	Jastrzębski Węgiel (Poland)	3–0	(Bulgaria) Levski Sofia	25–17	25–18	25–17			75–52	Report
20 Nov	20:00	Chaumont VB 52 (France)	0–3	(Poland) Jastrzębski Węgiel	23–25	18–25	20–25			61–75	Report
20 Nov	20:00	Levski Sofia (Bulgaria)	1–3	(Germany) SVG Lüneburg	28–26	15–25	24–26	21–25		88–102	Report
4 Dec	19:00	SVG Lüneburg (Germany)	1–3	(Poland) Jastrzębski Węgiel	26–24	19–25	19–25	23–25		87–99	Report
4 Dec	20:00	Levski Sofia (Bulgaria)	3–2	(France) Chaumont VB 52	22–25	21–25	26–24	25–19	15–12	109–105	Report
18 Dec	19:00	SVG Lüneburg (Germany)	3–0	(Bulgaria) Levski Sofia	25–22	28–26	25–22			78–70	Report
18 Dec	20:30	Jastrzębski Węgiel (Poland)	3–1	(France) Chaumont VB 52	25–20	24–26	25–23	32–30		106–99	Report
16 Jan	20:00	Levski Sofia (Bulgaria)	2–3	(Poland) Jastrzębski Węgiel	21–25	25–23	22–25	28–26	12–15	108–114	Report
16 Jan	20:00	Chaumont VB 52 (France)	3–0	(Germany) SVG Lüneburg	25–21	25–17	25–22			75–60	Report
29 Jan	20:00	Chaumont VB 52 (France)	3–0	(Bulgaria) Levski Sofia	27–25	25–17	26–24			78–66	Report
29 Jan	20:30	Jastrzębski Węgiel (Poland)	3–0	(Germany) SVG Lüneburg	25–16	25–20	25–21			75–57	Report

=== First place ranking ===
Pos	Pool	Team	Pld	W	L	Pts	SW	SL	SR	SPW	SPL	SPR	Qualification
1	A	(Poland) PGE Projekt Warsaw	6	6	0	18	18	2	9.000	497	393	1.265	Quarterfinals
2	C	(Poland) Aluron CMC Warta Zawiercie	6	6	0	17	18	2	9.000	484	401	1.207	Quarterfinals
3	E	(Poland) Jastrzębski Węgiel	6	6	0	17	18	4	4.500	544	464	1.172	Quarterfinals
4	D	(Italy) Sir Sicoma Monini Perugia	6	5	1	16	17	3	5.667	487	408	1.194	Quarterfinals
5	B	(Italy) Mint Vero Volley Monza	6	5	1	13	16	9	1.778	584	543	1.076	Quarterfinals

Source: CEV

=== Second place ranking ===
Pos	Pool	Team	Pld	W	L	Pts	SW	SL	SR	SPW	SPL	SPR	Qualification
1	B	(Greece) Olympiacos ONEX	6	4	2	13	16	10	1.600	594	585	1.015	Playoffs
2	A	(Germany) Berlin Recycling Volleys	6	4	2	12	13	8	1.625	499	467	1.069	Playoffs
3	C	(Italy) Allianz Milano	6	4	2	12	14	9	1.556	530	500	1.060	Playoffs
4	D	(Turkey) Halkbank Ankara	6	4	2	11	14	11	1.273	563	553	1.018	Playoffs
5	E	(Germany) SVG Lüneburg	6	3	3	8	10	12	0.833	490	513	0.955	Playoffs

Source: CEV

=== Third place ranking ===
Pos	Pool	Team	Pld	W	L	Pts	SW	SL	SR	SPW	SPL	SPR	Qualification
1	D	(France) Saint-Nazaire VB Atlantique	6	3	3	9	11	12	0.917	511	515	0.992	Playoffs
2	E	(France) Chaumont VB 52	6	2	4	8	11	12	0.917	524	522	1.004	2024–25 CEV Cup
3	B	(Turkey) Fenerbahçe Medicana İstanbul	6	2	4	6	10	14	0.714	560	562	0.996	2024–25 CEV Cup
4	C	(Belgium) Knack Roeselare	6	2	4	6	8	14	0.571	474	496	0.956	2024–25 CEV Cup
5	A	(Slovenia) ACH Volley Ljubljana	6	1	5	4	7	15	0.467	477	531	0.898	2024–25 CEV Cup

Source: CEV

== Bracket ==
Playoff 6
(France) Saint-Nazaire VB Atlantique	1	1
(Greece) Olympiacos ONEX	3	3
(Germany) SVG Lüneburg	3	2	15
(Germany) Berlin Recycling Volleys	2	3	13
(Turkey) Halkbank Ankara	3	1	15
(Italy) Allianz Milano	1	3	13

Quarterfinals
(Greece) Olympiacos ONEX	3	0
(Poland) Jastrzębski Węgiel	2	3
(Germany) SVG Lüneburg	0	1
(Poland) Warta Zawiercie	3	3
(Italy) Mint Vero Volley Monza	1	1
(Italy) Perugia	3	3
(Turkey) Halkbank Ankara	3	0	15
(Poland) PGE Projekt Warsaw	1	3	12

Semifinals
(Poland) Jastrzębski Węgiel	2
(Poland) Warta Zawiercie	3
(Italy) Perugia	3
(Turkey) Halkbank Ankara	0

Final
(Poland) Warta Zawiercie	2
(Italy) Perugia	3
Third place
(Poland) Jastrzębski Węgiel	3
(Turkey) Halkbank Ankara	1

== Playoff 6 ==
- The winners of the ties qualify for the quarterfinals.
- Aggregate score is counted as follows: 3 points for 3–0 or 3–1 win, 2 points for 3–2 win, 1 point for 2–3 loss.
- In case the teams are tied after two legs, a Golden Set is played immediately at the completion of the second leg.
- All times are local.

Team 1	Agg.	Team 2	1st leg	2nd leg	Golden Set
Saint-Nazaire VB Atlantique (France)	0–6	(Greece) Olympiacos ONEX	1–3	1–3	
SVG Lüneburg (Germany)	3–3	(Germany) Berlin Recycling Volleys	3–2	2–3	15–13
Halkbank Ankara (Turkey)	3–3	(Italy) Allianz Milano	3–1	1–3	15–13

=== First leg ===
Date	Time		Score		Set 1	Set 2	Set 3	Set 4	Set 5	Total	Report
12 Feb	20:00	Saint-Nazaire VB Atlantique (France)	1–3	(Greece) Olympiacos ONEX	25–20	20–25	21–25	23–25		89–95	Report
12 Feb	19:00	SVG Lüneburg (Germany)	3–2	(Germany) Berlin Recycling Volleys	25–19	23–25	25–23	24–26	27–25	124–118	Report
12 Feb	17:00	Halkbank Ankara (Turkey)	3–1	(Italy) Allianz Milano	25–27	25–16	25–21	33–31		108–95	Report

=== Second leg ===
Date	Time		Score		Set 1	Set 2	Set 3	Set 4	Set 5	Total	Report
27 Feb	19:00	Olympiacos ONEX (Greece)	3–1	(France) Saint-Nazaire VB Atlantique	25–19	18–25	25–23	25–21		93–88	Report
26 Feb	19:30	Berlin Recycling Volleys (Germany)	3–2	(Germany) SVG Lüneburg	25–13	23–25	23–25	27–25	17–15	115–103	Report
Golden set		Berlin Recycling Volleys (Germany)	13–15	(Germany) SVG Lüneburg							
25 Feb	20:45	Allianz Milano (Italy)	3–1	(Turkey) Halkbank Ankara	25–16	26–24	23–25	28–26		102–91	Report
Golden set		Allianz Milano (Italy)	13–15	(Turkey) Halkbank Ankara							

== Quarterfinals ==
- The winners of the ties qualify for the final four.
- Aggregate score is counted as follows: 3 points for 3–0 or 3–1 win, 2 points for 3–2 win, 1 point for 2–3 loss.
- In case the teams are tied after two legs, a Golden Set is played immediately at the completion of the second leg.
- All times are local.

Team 1	Agg.	Team 2	1st leg	2nd leg	Golden Set
Olympiacos ONEX (Greece)	2–4	(Poland) Jastrzębski Węgiel	3–2	0–3	
SVG Lüneburg (Germany)	0–6	(Poland) Aluron CMC Warta Zawiercie	0–3	1–3	
Mint Vero Volley Monza (Italy)	0–6	(Italy) Sir Sicoma Monini Perugia	1–3	1–3	
Halkbank Ankara (Turkey)	3–3	(Poland) PGE Projekt Warsaw	3–1	0–3	15–12

=== First leg ===
Date	Time		Score		Set 1	Set 2	Set 3	Set 4	Set 5	Total	Report
12 Mar	19:00	Olympiacos ONEX (Greece)	3–2	(Poland) Jastrzębski Węgiel	20–25	21–25	25–14	25–20	15–12	106–96	Report
11 Mar	19:00	SVG Lüneburg (Germany)	0–3	(Poland) Aluron CMC Warta Zawiercie	15–25	21–25	14–25			50–75	Report
11 Mar	20:30	Mint Vero Volley Monza (Italy)	1–3	(Italy) Sir Sicoma Monini Perugia	25–19	16–25	17–25	25–27		83–96	Report
12 Mar	18:00	Halkbank Ankara (Turkey)	3–1	(Poland) PGE Projekt Warsaw	25–20	22–25	25–15	25–18		97–78	Report

=== Second leg ===
Date	Time		Score		Set 1	Set 2	Set 3	Set 4	Set 5	Total	Report
19 Mar	20:30	Jastrzębski Węgiel (Poland)	3–0	(Greece) Olympiacos ONEX	25–21	25–21	25–19			75–61	Report
18 Mar	18:00	Aluron CMC Warta Zawiercie (Poland)	3–1	(Germany) SVG Lüneburg	25–19	25–19	23–25	25–20		98–83	Report
20 Mar	20:30	Sir Sicoma Monini Perugia (Italy)	3–1	(Italy) Mint Vero Volley Monza	25–18	23–25	25–14	31–29		104–86	Report
19 Mar	18:00	PGE Projekt Warsaw (Poland)	3–0	(Turkey) Halkbank Ankara	25–20	25–19	25–20			75–59	Report
Golden set		PGE Projekt Warsaw (Poland)	12–15	(Turkey) Halkbank Ankara							

== Final Four ==
- Place: Łódź
- Time: Central European Summer Time (UTC+02:00).

=== Semifinals ===
Date	Time		Score		Set 1	Set 2	Set 3	Set 4	Set 5	Total	Report
16 May	20:00	Sir Sicoma Monini Perugia (Italy)	3–0	(Turkey) Halkbank Ankara	25–23	25–23	25–22			75–68	Report
17 May	14:45	Jastrzębski Węgiel (Poland)	2–3	(Poland) Aluron CMC Warta Zawiercie	25–19	25–18	20–25	19–25	20–22	109–109	Report

=== 3rd place match ===
Date	Time		Score		Set 1	Set 2	Set 3	Set 4	Set 5	Total	Report
18 May	16:00	Jastrzębski Węgiel (Poland)	3–1	(Turkey) Halkbank Ankara	25–22	26–24	20–25	25–18		96–89	Report

=== Final ===
Date	Time		Score		Set 1	Set 2	Set 3	Set 4	Set 5	Total	Report
18 May	20:05	Aluron CMC Warta Zawiercie (Poland)	2–3	(Italy) Sir Sicoma Monini Perugia	22–25	22–25	25–20	25–22	10–15	104–107	Report

== Final standings ==
Qualified for the 2025 FIVB Club World Championship

Rank	Team
1st place, gold medalist(s)	(Italy) Sir Sicoma Monini Perugia
2nd place, silver medalist(s)	(Poland) Aluron CMC Warta Zawiercie
3rd place, bronze medalist(s)	(Poland) Jastrzębski Węgiel
4	Halkbank Ankara

2024–25 CEV Champions League winners

1st title

== See also ==
- 2024–25 CEV Cup
- 2024–25 CEV Challenge Cup
- 2024–25 CEV Women's Champions League
- 2024–25 Women's CEV Cup
- 2024–25 CEV Women's Challenge Cup
