= 2024–25 CEV Cup =

- League: CEV Cup
- Sport: Volleyball
- Duration: 8 October 2024 – 9 April 2025
- Teams: 44
- Finals champions: (Turkey) Ziraat Bank Ankara
- Finals MVP: (United States) Matt Anderson

CEV Cup seasons
- ← 2023–24 2025–26 →

The 2024–25 CEV Cup was the 53rd edition of the second most important European volleyball club competition organised by the European Volleyball Confederation.

This year's edition of the CEV Cup consisted of 43 teams, of which 25 teams qualified directly for the CEV Cup; 14 teams were the losers from the Champions League qualification phase; and the remaining 4 joined the rest in the quarterfinals, being transferred there from the Champions League group stage as the 3rd placed teams in their respective pools.

Ziraat Bank Ankara won their first ever European title, beating the reigning champions, Asseco Resovia in the finals. Matt Anderson was named MVP of the final match.

== Participating teams ==
The drawing of lots was held on 16 July 2024 in Luxembourg City.

Rank	Country	Number of teams	Teams
1	Turkey	3	Ziraat Bank Ankara, Galatasaray, Fenerbahçe
2	France	2	Tours VB, Chaumont VB 52
3	Czech Republic	2	Lvi Praha, Blue Volley Ostrava
4	Italy	1	Itas Trentino
6	Romania	3	CS Arcada Galați, CS Rapid București, CSM Corona Brașov
7	Belgium	3	Lindemans Aalst, Volley Haasrode Leuven, Knack Roeselare
8	Switzerland	3	Volley Amriswil, Lausanne UC, Volley Schönenwerd
9	Greece	1	AONS Milon
10	Austria	2	TSV Raiffeisen Hartberg, SK Zadruga Aich/Dob
11	Portugal	1	Sport Lisboa e Benfica
12	Bulgaria	1	Deya Volley Burgas
13	Netherlands	2	Draisma Dynamo Apeldoorn, Orion Stars Doetinchem
14	Serbia	2	Vojvodina Novi Sad, Crvena Zvezda Beograd
15	Slovenia	3	Calcit Kamnik, OK Maribor, ACH Volley Ljubljana
16	Poland	1	Asseco Resovia
17	Germany	1	VfB Friedrichshafen
18	Spain	1	Guaguas Las Palmas
20	Finland	1	Valepa Sastamala
21	Estonia	1	Selver x TalTech Tallinn
22	Croatia	1	Mladost Zagreb
26	Cyprus	2	Pafiakos Pafos, Omonia Nicosia
27	Hungary	1	Fino Kaposvár
28	Bosnia and Herzegovina	2	Napredak Odžak, Radnik Bijeljina
31	North Macedonia	1	Strumica Nikob
34	Montenegro	1	OK Budva
35	Latvia	1	SK Jēkabpils Lūši

== Format ==
Qualification round (Home and away matches):

- 32nd finals

Main phase (Home and away matches):

- 16th finals → 8th finals → Playoffs → 4th finals

Final phase (Home and away matches):

- Semifinals → Finals

Aggregate score is counted as follows: 3 points for 3–0 or 3–1 win, 2 points for 3–2 win, 1 point for 2–3 loss.
In case the teams are tied after two legs, a Golden Set is played immediately at the completion of the second leg.

== Qualification round ==
=== 32nd finals ===
Team 1	Agg.	Team 2	1st leg	2nd leg	Golden Set
SK Zadruga Aich/Dob (Austria)	2–4	(Switzerland) Lausanne UC	3–2	0–3	
Strumica Nikob (North Macedonia)	3–3	(Hungary) Fino Kaposvár	3–0	0–3	11–15
Napredak Odžak (Bosnia and Herzegovina)	1–5	(Cyprus) Pafiakos Pafos	2–3	0–3	
Volley Haasrode Leuven (Belgium)	2–4	(Portugal) Sport Lisboa e Benfica	0–3	3–2	
Selver x TalTech Tallinn (Estonia)	4–2	(Slovenia) OK Maribor	3–1	2–3	
Omonia Nicosia (Cyprus)	6–0	(Bosnia and Herzegovina) Radnik Bijeljina	3–0	3–1	
Valepa Sastamala (Finland)	6–0	(Montenegro) OK Budva	3–0	3–1	
	Bye	(Latvia) SK Jēkabpils Lūši			

==== First leg ====
Date	Time		Score		Set 1	Set 2	Set 3	Set 4	Set 5	Total	Report
9 Oct	19:00	SK Zadruga Aich/Dob (Austria)	3–2	(Switzerland) Lausanne UC	31–29	25–27	22–25	25–23	15–8	118–112	Report
8 Oct	19:00	Strumica Nikob (North Macedonia)	3–0	(Hungary) Fino Kaposvár	25–19	25–23	25–19			75–61	Report
9 Oct	20:00	Napredak Odžak (Bosnia and Herzegovina)	2–3	(Cyprus) Pafiakos Pafos	25–17	27–25	18–25	19–25	12–15	101–107	Report
9 Oct	20:30	Volley Haasrode Leuven (Belgium)	0–3	(Portugal) Sport Lisboa e Benfica	21–25	19–25	21–25			61–75	Report
8 Oct	20:00	Selver x TalTech Tallinn (Estonia)	3–1	(Slovenia) OK Maribor	22–25	25–21	27–25	25–23		99–94	Report
8 Oct	20:00	Omonia Nicosia (Cyprus)	3–0	(Bosnia and Herzegovina) Radnik Bijeljina	25–23	25–22	25–16			75–61	Report
8 Oct	18:30	Valepa Sastamala (Finland)	3–0	(Montenegro) OK Budva	25–22	25–11	25–12			75–45	Report

==== Second leg ====
Date	Time		Score		Set 1	Set 2	Set 3	Set 4	Set 5	Total	Report
16 Oct	19:00	Lausanne UC (Switzerland)	3–0	(Austria) SK Zadruga Aich/Dob	25–22	25–23	25–23			75–68	Report
16 Oct	18:00	Fino Kaposvár (Hungary)	3–0	(North Macedonia) Strumica Nikob	25–19	28–26	26–24			79–69	Report
Golden set		Fino Kaposvár (Hungary)	15–11	(North Macedonia) Strumica Nikob							
16 Oct	20:00	Pafiakos Pafos (Cyprus)	3–0	(Bosnia and Herzegovina) Napredak Odžak	25–18	25–22	25–16			75–56	Report
17 Oct	20:00	Sport Lisboa e Benfica (Portugal)	2–3	(Belgium) Volley Haasrode Leuven	27–25	27–29	20–25	25–21	11–15	110–115	Report
16 Oct	20:00	OK Maribor (Slovenia)	3–2	(Estonia) Selver x TalTech Tallinn	23–25	19–25	25–23	25–23	15–13	107–109	Report
15 Oct	19:00	Radnik Bijeljina (Bosnia and Herzegovina)	1–3	(Cyprus) Omonia Nicosia	17–25	33–35	26–24	17–25		93–109	Report
16 Oct	18:00	OK Budva (Montenegro)	1–3	(Finland) Valepa Sastamala	18–25	13–25	25–23	22–25		78–98	Report

== Main phase ==
=== 16th finals ===
Team 1	Agg.	Team 2	1st leg	2nd leg	Golden Set
Lausanne UC (Switzerland)	1–5	(Netherlands) Draisma Dynamo Apeldoorn	1–3	2–3	
Pafiakos Pafos (Cyprus)	3–3	(Belgium) Lindemans Aalst	3–1	0–3	15–10
Orion Stars Doetinchem (Netherlands)	0–6	(Poland) Asseco Resovia	0–3	0–3	
Lvi Praha (Czech Republic)	6–0	(Czech Republic) Blue Volley Ostrava	3–0	3–0	
Omonia Nicosia (Cyprus)	3–3	(Bulgaria) Deya Volley Burgas	3–1	0–3	15–12
Crvena Zvezda Beograd (Serbia)	2–4	(Switzerland) Volley Amriswil	0–3	3–2	
Mladost Zagreb (Croatia)	4–2	(Germany) VfB Friedrichshafen	3–1	2–3	
Volley Schönenwerd (Switzerland)	1–5	(France) Tours VB	2–3	1–3	
CSM Corona Brașov (Romania)	6–0	(Serbia) Vojvodina Novi Sad	3–1	3–0	
Selver x TalTech Tallinn (Estonia)	6–0	(Romania) CS Rapid București	3–1	3–1	
Sport Lisboa e Benfica (Portugal)	6–0	(Slovenia) Calcit Kamnik	3–0	3–0	
CS Arcada Galați (Romania)	0–6	(Italy) Itas Trentino	1–3	0–3	
Guaguas Las Palmas (Spain)	6–0	(Austria) TSV Raiffeisen Hartberg	3–0	3–0	
SK Jēkabpils Lūši (Latvia)	1–5	(Greece) AONS Milon	1–3	2–3	
Fino Kaposvár (Hungary)	1–5	(Turkey) Galatasaray	2–3	0–3	
Valepa Sastamala (Finland)	0–6	(Turkey) Ziraat Bank Ankara	1–3	0–3	

==== First leg ====
Date	Time		Score		Set 1	Set 2	Set 3	Set 4	Set 5	Total	Report
13 Nov	19:00	Lausanne UC (Switzerland)	1–3	(Netherlands) Draisma Dynamo Apeldoorn	25–18	18–25	22–25	24–26		89–94	Report
13 Nov	19:30	Pafiakos Pafos (Cyprus)	3–1	(Belgium) Lindemans Aalst	22–25	25–20	25–23	25–19		97–87	Report
13 Nov	20:00	Orion Stars Doetinchem (Netherlands)	0–3	(Poland) Asseco Resovia	22–25	22–25	15–25			59–75	Report
13 Nov	18:00	Lvi Praha (Czech Republic)	3–0	(Czech Republic) Blue Volley Ostrava	25–10	25–10	25–13			75–33	Report
12 Nov	20:00	Omonia Nicosia (Cyprus)	3–1	(Bulgaria) Deya Volley Burgas	20–25	25–19	25–19	25–15		95–78	Report
12 Nov	20:00	Crvena Zvezda Beograd (Serbia)	0–3	(Switzerland) Volley Amriswil	17–25	19–25	25–27			61–77	Report
14 Nov	16:30	Mladost Zagreb (Croatia)	3–1	(Germany) VfB Friedrichshafen	22–25	25–22	25–19	25–20		97–86	Report
13 Nov	19:30	Volley Schönenwerd (Switzerland)	2–3	(France) Tours VB	25–23	18–25	25–22	15–25	13–15	96–110	Report
13 Nov	18:00	CSM Corona Brașov (Romania)	3–1	(Serbia) Vojvodina Novi Sad	25–19	25–21	23–25	25–21		98–86	Report
13 Nov	18:00	Selver x TalTech Tallinn (Estonia)	3–1	(Romania) CS Rapid București	20–25	25–16	25–17	25–17		95–75	Report
12 Nov	20:00	Sport Lisboa e Benfica (Portugal)	3–0	(Slovenia) Calcit Kamnik	25–20	25–20	25–15			75–55	Report
13 Nov	18:00	CS Arcada Galați (Romania)	1–3	(Italy) Itas Trentino	18–25	25–22	16–25	22–25		81–97	Report
13 Nov	19:00	Guaguas Las Palmas (Spain)	3–0	(Austria) TSV Raiffeisen Hartberg	25–14	26–24	25–23			76–61	Report
13 Nov	19:30	SK Jēkabpils Lūši (Latvia)	1–3	(Greece) AONS Milon	28–26	18–25	17–25	19–25		82–101	Report
12 Nov	19:00	Fino Kaposvár (Hungary)	2–3	(Turkey) Galatasaray	25–21	25–22	14–25	18–25	8–15	90–108	Report
12 Nov	18:30	Valepa Sastamala (Finland)	1–3	(Turkey) Ziraat Bank Ankara	20–25	11–25	25–22	15–25		71–97	Report

==== Second leg ====
Date	Time		Score		Set 1	Set 2	Set 3	Set 4	Set 5	Total	Report
20 Nov	19:30	Draisma Dynamo Apeldoorn (Netherlands)	3–2	(Switzerland) Lausanne UC	25–22	23–25	19–25	25–21	15–11	107–104	Report
20 Nov	20:30	Lindemans Aalst (Belgium)	3–0	(Cyprus) Pafiakos Pafos	25–18	25–10	30–28			80–56	Report
Golden set		Lindemans Aalst (Belgium)	10–15	(Cyprus) Pafiakos Pafos							
20 Nov	18:00	Asseco Resovia (Poland)	3–0	(Netherlands) Orion Stars Doetinchem	25–15	25–11	25–17			75–43	Report
19 Nov	18:00	Blue Volley Ostrava (Czech Republic)	0–3	(Czech Republic) Lvi Praha	15–25	18–25	17–25			50–75	Report
20 Nov	19:00	Deya Volley Burgas (Bulgaria)	3–0	(Cyprus) Omonia Nicosia	25–15	25–18	25–19			75–52	Report
Golden set		Deya Volley Burgas (Bulgaria)	12–15	(Cyprus) Omonia Nicosia							
20 Nov	19:00	Volley Amriswil (Switzerland)	2–3	(Serbia) Crvena Zvezda Beograd	27–29	25–20	24–26	25–16	14–16	115–107	Report
20 Nov	20:00	VfB Friedrichshafen (Germany)	3–2	(Croatia) Mladost Zagreb	21–25	23–25	25–13	25–20	15–9	109–92	Report
20 Nov	20:00	Tours VB (France)	3–1	(Switzerland) Volley Schönenwerd	25–21	24–26	25–15	25–17		99–79	Report
20 Nov	19:00	Vojvodina Novi Sad (Serbia)	0–3	(Romania) CSM Corona Brașov	22–25	17–25	22–25			61–75	Report
19 Nov	18:00	CS Rapid București (Romania)	1–3	(Estonia) Selver x TalTech Tallinn	26–24	15–25	20–25	26–28		87–102	Report
19 Nov	20:00	Calcit Kamnik (Slovenia)	0–3	(Portugal) Sport Lisboa e Benfica	15–25	22–25	17–25			54–75	Report
20 Nov	20:30	Itas Trentino (Italy)	3–0	(Romania) CS Arcada Galați	25–17	25–20	25–16			75–53	Report
20 Nov	19:30	TSV Raiffeisen Hartberg (Austria)	0–3	(Spain) Guaguas Las Palmas	16–25	23–25	18–25			57–75	Report
20 Nov	20:00	AONS Milon (Greece)	3–2	(Latvia) SK Jēkabpils Lūši	25–22	25–27	25–20	19–25	16–14	110–108	Report
21 Nov	20:00	Galatasaray (Turkey)	3–0	(Hungary) Fino Kaposvár	25–19	25–14	25–17			75–50	Report
20 Nov	19:00	Ziraat Bank Ankara (Turkey)	3–0	(Finland) Valepa Sastamala	25–20	25–21	25–17			75–58	Report

=== 8th finals ===
Team 1	Agg.	Team 2	1st leg	2nd leg
Draisma Dynamo Apeldoorn (Netherlands)	2–4	(Cyprus) Pafiakos Pafos	3–2	1–3
Asseco Resovia (Poland)	6–0	(Czech Republic) Lvi Praha	3–0	3–0
Omonia Nicosia (Cyprus)	1–5	(Switzerland) Volley Amriswil	2–3	0–3
Mladost Zagreb (Croatia)	0–6	(France) Tours VB	1–3	0–3
CSM Corona Brașov (Romania)	6–0	(Estonia) Selver x TalTech Tallinn	3–0	3–0
Sport Lisboa e Benfica (Portugal)	2–4	(Italy) Itas Trentino	0–3	3–2
Guaguas Las Palmas (Spain)	6–0	(Greece) AONS Milon	3–0	3–1
Galatasaray (Turkey)	0–6	(Turkey) Ziraat Bank Ankara	1–3	0–3

==== First leg ====
Date	Time		Score		Set 1	Set 2	Set 3	Set 4	Set 5	Total	Report
4 Dec	19:30	Draisma Dynamo Apeldoorn (Netherlands)	3–2	(Cyprus) Pafiakos Pafos	22–25	24–26	25–23	25–18	15–11	111–103	Report
4 Dec	17:00	Asseco Resovia (Poland)	3–0	(Czech Republic) Lvi Praha	25–14	25–18	25–23			75–55	Report
3 Dec	20:00	Omonia Nicosia (Cyprus)	2–3	(Switzerland) Volley Amriswil	19–25	13–25	25–23	28–26	12–15	97–114	Report
5 Dec	19:30	Mladost Zagreb (Croatia)	1–3	(France) Tours VB	21–25	25–23	20–25	18–25		84–98	Report
4 Dec	18:00	CSM Corona Brașov (Romania)	3–0	(Estonia) Selver x TalTech Tallinn	25–23	28–26	25–14			78–63	Report
4 Dec	19:00	Sport Lisboa e Benfica (Portugal)	0–3	(Italy) Itas Trentino	20–25	23–25	19–25			62–75	Report
4 Dec	19:00	Guaguas Las Palmas (Spain)	3–0	(Greece) AONS Milon	25–23	25–23	25–15			75–61	Report
4 Dec	20:00	Galatasaray (Turkey)	1–3	(Turkey) Ziraat Bank Ankara	25–22	16–25	21–25	13–25		75–97	Report

==== Second leg ====
Date	Time		Score		Set 1	Set 2	Set 3	Set 4	Set 5	Total	Report
18 Dec	19:30	Pafiakos Pafos (Cyprus)	3–1	(Netherlands) Draisma Dynamo Apeldoorn	25–20	25–18	21–25	25–19		96–82	Report
18 Dec	18:00	Lvi Praha (Czech Republic)	0–3	(Poland) Asseco Resovia	24–26	18–25	19–25			61–76	Report
18 Dec	19:00	Volley Amriswil (Switzerland)	3–0	(Cyprus) Omonia Nicosia	25–16	25–12	25–16			75–44	Report
18 Dec	20:00	Tours VB (France)	3–0	(Croatia) Mladost Zagreb	25–17	25–20	25–20			75–57	Report
17 Dec	18:30	Selver x TalTech Tallinn (Estonia)	0–3	(Romania) CSM Corona Brașov	14–25	19–25	15–25			48–75	Report
19 Dec	19:00	Itas Trentino (Italy)	2–3	(Portugal) Sport Lisboa e Benfica	25–22	25–22	20–25	18–25	13–15	101–109	Report
18 Dec	20:00	AONS Milon (Greece)	1–3	(Spain) Guaguas Las Palmas	21–25	23–25	25–23	18–25		87–98	Report
19 Dec	19:00	Ziraat Bank Ankara (Turkey)	3–0	(Turkey) Galatasaray	25–21	25–19	25–18			75–58	Report

=== Playoffs ===
Team 1	Agg.	Team 2	1st leg	2nd leg
Pafiakos Pafos (Cyprus)	0–6	(Poland) Asseco Resovia	1–3	0–3
Volley Amriswil (Switzerland)	2–4	(France) Tours VB	1–3	3–2
CSM Corona Brașov (Romania)	0–6	(Italy) Itas Trentino	1–3	0–3
Guaguas Las Palmas (Spain)	1–5	(Turkey) Ziraat Bank Ankara	2–3	0–3

==== First leg ====
Date	Time		Score		Set 1	Set 2	Set 3	Set 4	Set 5	Total	Report
15 Jan	21:00	Pafiakos Pafos (Cyprus)	1–3	(Poland) Asseco Resovia	25–22	12–25	23–25	21–25		81–97	Report
15 Jan	19:00	Volley Amriswil (Switzerland)	1–3	(France) Tours VB	19–25	21–25	25–23	22–25		87–98	Report
15 Jan	17:30	CSM Corona Brașov (Romania)	1–3	(Italy) Itas Trentino	25–21	17–25	21–25	23–25		86–96	Report
16 Jan	19:00	Guaguas Las Palmas (Spain)	2–3	(Turkey) Ziraat Bank Ankara	26–24	27–29	15–25	25–19	9–15	102–112	Report

==== Second leg ====
Date	Time		Score		Set 1	Set 2	Set 3	Set 4	Set 5	Total	Report
28 Jan	20:30	Asseco Resovia (Poland)	3–0	(Cyprus) Pafiakos Pafos	25–23	27–25	25–16			77–64	Report
29 Jan	20:00	Tours VB (France)	2–3	(Switzerland) Volley Amriswil	25–19	20–25	25–21	22–25	12–15	104–105	Report
30 Jan	20:30	Itas Trentino (Italy)	3–0	(Romania) CSM Corona Brașov	25–17	25–18	25–17			75–52	Report
29 Jan	19:00	Ziraat Bank Ankara (Turkey)	3–0	(Spain) Guaguas Las Palmas	25–18	25–23	25–21			75–62	Report

=== 4th finals ===
Team 1	Agg.	Team 2	1st leg	2nd leg
Fenerbahçe (Turkey)	0–6	(Poland) Asseco Resovia	1–3	1–3
Knack Roeselare (Belgium)	1–5	(France) Tours VB	2–3	0–3
Chaumont VB 52 (France)	0–6	(Italy) Itas Trentino	1–3	0–3
ACH Volley Ljubljana (Slovenia)	1–5	(Turkey) Ziraat Bank Ankara	0–3	2–3

==== First leg ====
Date	Time		Score		Set 1	Set 2	Set 3	Set 4	Set 5	Total	Report
12 Feb	19:00	Fenerbahçe (Turkey)	1–3	(Poland) Asseco Resovia	25–22	18–25	15–25	23–25		81–97	Report
12 Feb	20:30	Knack Roeselare (Belgium)	2–3	(France) Tours VB	25–15	25–15	28–30	23–25	10–15	111–100	Report
11 Feb	20:00	Chaumont VB 52 (France)	1–3	(Italy) Itas Trentino	25–23	21–25	17–25	19–25		82–98	Report
12 Feb	18:00	ACH Volley Ljubljana (Slovenia)	0–3	(Turkey) Ziraat Bank Ankara	21–25	20–25	19–25			60–75	Report

==== Second leg ====
Date	Time		Score		Set 1	Set 2	Set 3	Set 4	Set 5	Total	Report
25 Feb	18:00	Asseco Resovia (Poland)	3–1	(Turkey) Fenerbahçe	17–25	25–19	25–21	25–19		92–84	Report
26 Feb	20:00	Tours VB (France)	3–0	(Belgium) Knack Roeselare	25–21	25–19	25–17			75–57	Report
26 Feb	20:30	Itas Trentino (Italy)	3–0	(France) Chaumont VB 52	25–21	25–16	25–18			75–55	Report
25 Feb	19:00	Ziraat Bank Ankara (Turkey)	3–2	(Slovenia) ACH Volley Ljubljana	25–20	25–18	20–25	23–25	15–13	108–101	Report

== Final phase ==
=== Semifinals ===
Team 1	Agg.	Team 2	1st leg	2nd leg
Asseco Resovia (Poland)	5–1	(France) Tours VB	3–2	3–0
Itas Trentino (Italy)	2–4	(Turkey) Ziraat Bank Ankara	3–2	1–3

==== First leg ====
Date	Time		Score		Set 1	Set 2	Set 3	Set 4	Set 5	Total	Report
11 Mar	17:30	Asseco Resovia (Poland)	3–2	(France) Tours VB	23–25	25–21	22–25	25–21	15–10	110–102	Report
12 Mar	20:30	Itas Trentino (Italy)	3–2	(Turkey) Ziraat Bank Ankara	26–28	27–29	25–21	25–23	15–8	118–109	Report

==== Second leg ====
Date	Time		Score		Set 1	Set 2	Set 3	Set 4	Set 5	Total	Report
19 Mar	20:00	Tours VB (France)	0–3	(Poland) Asseco Resovia	28–30	20–25	22–25			70–80	Report
19 Mar	19:00	Ziraat Bank Ankara (Turkey)	3–1	(Italy) Itas Trentino	25–17	25–23	17–25	25–20		92–85	Report

=== Finals ===
Team 1	Agg.	Team 2	1st leg	2nd leg
Asseco Resovia (Poland)	1–5	(Turkey) Ziraat Bank Ankara	2–3	1–3

==== First leg ====
Date	Time		Score		Set 1	Set 2	Set 3	Set 4	Set 5	Total	Report
2 April	18:00	Asseco Resovia (Poland)	2–3	(Turkey) Ziraat Bank Ankara	27–25	21–25	25–23	23–25	17–19	113–117	Report

==== Second leg ====
Date	Time		Score		Set 1	Set 2	Set 3	Set 4	Set 5	Total	Report
9 April	18:30	Ziraat Bank Ankara (Turkey)	3–1	(Poland) Asseco Resovia	20–25	25–17	28–26	25–14		98–82	Report

== Final standings ==
Rank	Team
1st place, gold medalist(s)	(Turkey) Ziraat Bank Ankara
2nd place, silver medalist(s)	(Poland) Asseco Resovia
Semifinalists	(Italy) Itas Trentino (France) Tours VB

== See also ==
- 2024–25 CEV Champions League
- 2024–25 CEV Challenge Cup
- 2024–25 CEV Women's Champions League
- 2024–25 Women's CEV Cup
- 2024–25 CEV Women's Challenge Cup
