= 2025–26 CEV Champions League =

- League: CEV Champions League
- Sport: Volleyball
- Duration: Qualifying round: 21 October – 27 November 2025; Main tournament: 9 December 2025 – 17 May 2026
- Teams: 32 (14 qual. + 18 main tourn.)

Finals
- Venue: (Italy) Turin
- Champions: (Italy) Sir Sicoma Monini Perugia
- Finals MVP: (Italy) Massimo Colaci

CEV Champions League seasons
- ← 2024–25 2026–27 →

The 2025–26 CEV Champions League was the 67th edition of the highest level European volleyball club competition organised by the European Volleyball Confederation.

== Qualification ==
Rank	Country	Number of teams			Qualified teams
Rank	Country	Vac	Qual	Total	Qualified teams
1	Italy	3	–	3	Itas Trentino
1	Italy	3	–	3	Cucine Lube Civitanova
1	Italy	3	–	3	Sir Sicoma Monini Perugia
2	Poland	3+1	–	4	Bogdanka LUK Lublin
2	Poland	3+1	–	4	Aluron CMC Warta Zawiercie
2	Poland	3+1	–	4	PGE Projekt Warsaw
2	Poland	3+1	–	4	Asseco Resovia (Wild card)
4	Germany	2	–	2	Berlin Recycling Volleys
4	Germany	2	–	2	SVG Lüneburg
5	Turkey	2+1	–	3	Ziraat Bankkart Ankara
5	Turkey	2+1	–	3	Galatasaray HDI
5	Turkey	2+1	–	3	Halkbank Ankara (Wild card)
6	Belgium	2	–	2	Knack Roeselare
6	Belgium	2	–	2	Volley Haasrode Leuven
7	France	1+1	–	2	Tours VB
7	France	1+1	–	2	Montpellier HSC VB (Wild card)
8	Czech Republic	1	–	1	Lvi Praha
9	Portugal	1	–	1	Sporting CP
11	Slovenia	–	1	1	ACH Volley Ljubljana
13	Spain	–	1	1	Guaguas Las Palmas

== Pools composition ==
The drawing of lots was held on 15 July 2025 in Luxembourg City.

Pool A	Pool B	Pool C
Itas Trentino	Bogdanka LUK Lublin	Berlin Recycling Volleys
Ziraat Bankkart Ankara	Galatasaray HDI	Sir Sicoma Monini Perugia
Tours VB	Knack Roeselare	Lvi Praha
ACH Volley Ljubljana	Halkbank Ankara	Guaguas Las Palmas

Pool D	Pool E
Aluron CMC Warta Zawiercie	Cucine Lube Civitanova
SVG Lüneburg	PGE Projekt Warsaw
Sporting CP	Volley Haasrode Leuven
Asseco Resovia	Montpellier HSC VB

== League round ==
- The teams are split into 5 groups, each one featuring four teams.
- The top team in each pool automatically qualifies for the quarterfinals.
- All 2nd placed teams and the best 3rd placed team qualify for the playoffs.
- The remaining 3rd placed teams will compete in the quarterfinals of the 2025–26 CEV Cup.
- All times are local.

=== Pool standing procedure ===
1. Number of victories
2. Points
3. Set ratio
4. Setpoint ratio
5. H2H results

Result	Winners	Losers
3–0	3 points	0 points
3–1	3 points	0 points
3–2	2 points	1 point

=== Pool A ===
Pos	Team	Pld	W	L	Pts	SW	SL	SR	SPW	SPL	SPR	Qualification
1	(Turkey) Ziraat Bankkart Ankara	6	6	0	18	18	3	6.000	521	449	1.160	Quarterfinals
2	(Italy) Itas Trentino	6	4	2	11	13	10	1.300	549	537	1.022	Playoffs
3	(Slovenia) ACH Volley Ljubljana	6	1	5	4	6	15	0.400	446	493	0.905	2025–26 CEV Cup
4	(France) Tours VB	6	1	5	3	8	17	0.471	551	588	0.937	

Source: CEV

Date	Time		Score		Set 1	Set 2	Set 3	Set 4	Set 5	Total	Report
10 Dec	19:00	Ziraat Bankkart Ankara (Turkey)	3–1	(France) Tours VB	25–21	21–25	25–19	25–21		96–86	Report
11 Dec	20:30	Itas Trentino (Italy)	3–0	(Slovenia) ACH Volley Ljubljana	25–23	25–23	25–21			75–67	Report
6 Jan	20:00	Tours VB (France)	1–3	(Italy) Itas Trentino	25–19	24–26	12–25	20–25		81–95	Report
8 Jan	20:00	ACH Volley Ljubljana (Slovenia)	0–3	(Turkey) Ziraat Bankkart Ankara	22–25	15–25	20–25			57–75	Report
21 Jan	20:00	Ziraat Bankkart Ankara (Turkey)	3–0	(Italy) Itas Trentino	25–15	33–31	25–22			83–68	Report
22 Jan	20:00	ACH Volley Ljubljana (Slovenia)	3–0	(France) Tours VB	26–24	25–19	25–22			76–65	Report
28 Jan	20:00	Ziraat Bankkart Ankara (Turkey)	3–0	(Slovenia) ACH Volley Ljubljana	25–21	25–21	25–20			75–62	Report
29 Jan	20:30	Itas Trentino (Italy)	3–2	(France) Tours VB	25–27	24–26	25–23	25–22	28–26	127–124	Report
11 Feb	20:00	Tours VB (France)	1–3	(Turkey) Ziraat Bankkart Ankara	23–25	25–21	20–25	21–25		89–96	Report
12 Feb	20:00	ACH Volley Ljubljana (Slovenia)	1–3	(Italy) Itas Trentino	21–25	17–25	25–22	23–25		86–97	Report
18 Feb	20:00	Tours VB (France)	3–2	(Slovenia) ACH Volley Ljubljana	25–19	23–25	18–25	25–16	15–13	106–98	Report
18 Feb	20:30	Itas Trentino (Italy)	1–3	(Turkey) Ziraat Bankkart Ankara	20–25	25–21	21–25	21–25		87–96	Report

=== Pool B ===
Pos	Team	Pld	W	L	Pts	SW	SL	SR	SPW	SPL	SPR	Qualification
1	(Poland) Bogdanka LUK Lublin	6	6	0	15	18	7	2.571	579	498	1.163	Quarterfinals
2	(Belgium) Knack Roeselare	6	3	3	10	15	14	1.071	628	607	1.035	Playoffs
3	(Turkey) Galatasaray HDI	6	2	4	7	11	15	0.733	567	596	0.951	2025–26 CEV Cup
4	(Turkey) Halkbank Ankara	6	1	5	4	9	17	0.529	538	611	0.881	

Source: CEV

Date	Time		Score		Set 1	Set 2	Set 3	Set 4	Set 5	Total	Report
9 Dec	18:00	Bogdanka LUK Lublin (Poland)	3–0	(Turkey) Halkbank Ankara	25–20	25–14	25–13			75–47	Report
10 Dec	20:00	Galatasaray HDI (Turkey)	3–2	(Belgium) Knack Roeselare	25–18	19–25	21–25	25–23	15–13	105–104	Report
7 Jan	20:00	Halkbank Ankara (Turkey)	3–2	(Turkey) Galatasaray HDI	25–18	25–19	18–25	35–37	18–16	121–115	Report
8 Jan	20:30	Knack Roeselare (Belgium)	2–3	(Poland) Bogdanka LUK Lublin	25–15	20–25	25–23	20–25	12–15	102–103	Report
21 Jan	17:00	Halkbank Ankara (Turkey)	2–3	(Belgium) Knack Roeselare	18–25	25–21	26–24	15–25	12–15	96–110	Report
22 Jan	20:00	Galatasaray HDI (Turkey)	1–3	(Poland) Bogdanka LUK Lublin	26–24	17–25	19–25	18–25		80–99	Report
27 Jan	20:30	Bogdanka LUK Lublin (Poland)	3–2	(Belgium) Knack Roeselare	22–25	23–25	27–25	25–16	15–13	112–104	Report
29 Jan	20:00	Galatasaray HDI (Turkey)	3–1	(Turkey) Halkbank Ankara	25–16	27–25	22–25	25–20		99–86	Report
10 Feb	20:30	Knack Roeselare (Belgium)	3–2	(Turkey) Galatasaray HDI	25–22	21–25	26–24	23–25	15–10	110–106	Report
12 Feb	19:30	Halkbank Ankara (Turkey)	2–3	(Poland) Bogdanka LUK Lublin	26–24	16–25	24–26	26–24	11–15	103–114	Report
18 Feb	20:30	Bogdanka LUK Lublin (Poland)	3–0	(Turkey) Galatasaray HDI	25–17	25–21	26–24			76–62	Report
18 Feb	20:30	Knack Roeselare (Belgium)	3–1	(Turkey) Halkbank Ankara	23–25	25–21	25–20	25–19		98–85	Report

=== Pool C ===
Pos	Team	Pld	W	L	Pts	SW	SL	SR	SPW	SPL	SPR	Qualification
1	(Italy) Sir Sicoma Monini Perugia	6	6	0	17	18	4	4.500	524	425	1.233	Quarterfinals
2	(Spain) Guaguas Las Palmas	6	3	3	8	12	14	0.857	573	582	0.985	Playoffs
3	(Germany) Berlin Recycling Volleys	6	3	3	8	10	12	0.833	493	509	0.969	2025–26 CEV Cup
4	(Czech Republic) Lvi Praha	6	0	6	3	8	18	0.444	526	600	0.877	

Source: CEV

Date	Time		Score		Set 1	Set 2	Set 3	Set 4	Set 5	Total	Report
10 Dec	20:30	Sir Sicoma Monini Perugia (Italy)	3–1	(Czech Republic) Lvi Praha	24–26	25–18	25–18	25–19		99–81	Report
11 Dec	19:30	Berlin Recycling Volleys (Germany)	3–0	(Spain) Guaguas Las Palmas	25–20	29–27	25–17			79–64	Report
7 Jan	18:30	Guaguas Las Palmas (Spain)	2–3	(Italy) Sir Sicoma Monini Perugia	23–25	20–25	25–22	25–16	10–15	103–103	Report
8 Jan	18:00	Lvi Praha (Czech Republic)	2–3	(Germany) Berlin Recycling Volleys	26–28	25–22	14–25	25–20	9–15	99–110	Report
21 Jan	20:30	Sir Sicoma Monini Perugia (Italy)	3–0	(Germany) Berlin Recycling Volleys	25–13	25–23	25–14			75–50	Report
22 Jan	19:00	Guaguas Las Palmas (Spain)	3–2	(Czech Republic) Lvi Praha	25–16	21–25	25–21	19–25	15–11	105–98	Report
27 Jan	19:30	Berlin Recycling Volleys (Germany)	3–1	(Czech Republic) Lvi Praha	25–19	23–25	27–25	26–24		101–93	Report
28 Jan	20:30	Sir Sicoma Monini Perugia (Italy)	3–1	(Spain) Guaguas Las Palmas	26–24	25–19	21–25	25–20		97–88	Report
12 Feb	18:00	Lvi Praha (Czech Republic)	0–3	(Italy) Sir Sicoma Monini Perugia	13–25	18–25	17–25			48–75	Report
12 Feb	19:00	Guaguas Las Palmas (Spain)	3–1	(Germany) Berlin Recycling Volleys	22–25	30–28	25–21	26–24		103–98	Report
18 Feb	18:00	Lvi Praha (Czech Republic)	2–3	(Spain) Guaguas Las Palmas	18–25	28–30	25–21	25–19	11–15	107–110	Report
18 Feb	19:30	Berlin Recycling Volleys (Germany)	0–3	(Italy) Sir Sicoma Monini Perugia	17–25	18–25	20–25			55–75	Report

=== Pool D ===
Pos	Team	Pld	W	L	Pts	SW	SL	SR	SPW	SPL	SPR	Qualification
1	(Poland) Aluron CMC Warta Zawiercie	6	5	1	15	15	4	3.750	474	418	1.134	Quarterfinals
2	(Poland) Asseco Resovia	6	3	3	9	12	9	1.333	498	466	1.069	Playoffs
3	(Germany) SVG Lüneburg	6	2	4	6	7	14	0.500	461	499	0.924	2025–26 CEV Cup
4	(Portugal) Sporting CP	6	2	4	6	7	14	0.500	457	507	0.901	

Source: CEV

Date	Time		Score		Set 1	Set 2	Set 3	Set 4	Set 5	Total	Report
10 Dec	18:00	Aluron CMC Warta Zawiercie (Poland)	3–1	(Poland) Asseco Resovia	32–34	25–22	25–16	25–20		107–92	Report
10 Dec	19:00	SVG Lüneburg (Germany)	3–1	(Portugal) Sporting CP	25–18	25–19	23–25	25–23		98–85	Report
6 Jan	18:00	Asseco Resovia (Poland)	3–0	(Germany) SVG Lüneburg	25–14	25–15	25–19			75–48	Report
6 Jan	19:30	Sporting CP (Portugal)	0–3	(Poland) Aluron CMC Warta Zawiercie	22–25	24–26	20–25			66–76	Report
20 Jan	19:00	SVG Lüneburg (Germany)	0–3	(Poland) Aluron CMC Warta Zawiercie	19–25	21–25	22–25			62–75	Report
21 Jan	18:00	Asseco Resovia (Poland)	3–0	(Portugal) Sporting CP	25–9	25–23	25–19			75–51	Report
27 Jan	18:00	SVG Lüneburg (Germany)	3–1	(Poland) Asseco Resovia	25–22	25–27	25–23	25–20		100–92	Report
28 Jan	18:00	Aluron CMC Warta Zawiercie (Poland)	3–0	(Portugal) Sporting CP	25–21	25–21	25–22			75–64	Report
10 Feb	19:30	Sporting CP (Portugal)	3–1	(Germany) SVG Lüneburg	25–21	25–19	16–25	31–29		97–94	Report
11 Feb	18:00	Asseco Resovia (Poland)	3–0	(Poland) Aluron CMC Warta Zawiercie	25–21	25–23	25–22			75–66	Report
18 Feb	18:00	Aluron CMC Warta Zawiercie (Poland)	3–0	(Germany) SVG Lüneburg	25–20	25–17	25–22			75–59	Report
18 Feb	19:30	Sporting CP (Portugal)	3–1	(Poland) Asseco Resovia	25–22	25–22	19–25	25–20		94–89	Report

=== Pool E ===
Pos	Team	Pld	W	L	Pts	SW	SL	SR	SPW	SPL	SPR	Qualification
1	(Italy) Cucine Lube Civitanova	6	5	1	15	17	5	3.400	525	420	1.250	Quarterfinals
2	(France) Montpellier HSC VB	6	4	2	10	12	10	1.200	487	498	0.978	Playoffs
3	(Poland) PGE Projekt Warsaw	6	3	3	10	13	11	1.182	539	515	1.047	Playoffs
4	(Belgium) Volley Haasrode Leuven	6	0	6	1	2	18	0.111	367	485	0.757	

Source: CEV

Date	Time		Score		Set 1	Set 2	Set 3	Set 4	Set 5	Total	Report
9 Dec	20:30	Cucine Lube Civitanova (Italy)	3–0	(France) Montpellier HSC VB	25–16	25–17	25–22			75–55	Report
10 Dec	20:30	PGE Projekt Warsaw (Poland)	3–0	(Belgium) Volley Haasrode Leuven	25–17	25–17	25–20			75–54	Report
7 Jan	20:30	Volley Haasrode Leuven (Belgium)	0–3	(Italy) Cucine Lube Civitanova	17–25	17–25	13–25			47–75	Report
7 Jan	20:30	Montpellier HSC VB (France)	3–2	(Poland) PGE Projekt Warsaw	25–21	22–25	27–25	22–25	15–12	111–108	Report
20 Jan	20:00	Montpellier HSC VB (France)	3–0	(Belgium) Volley Haasrode Leuven	25–22	25–18	25–20			75–60	Report
21 Jan	20:30	PGE Projekt Warsaw (Poland)	0–3	(Italy) Cucine Lube Civitanova	18–25	21–25	24–26			63–76	Report
27 Jan	20:30	Cucine Lube Civitanova (Italy)	3–0	(Belgium) Volley Haasrode Leuven	25–10	25–19	25–19			75–48	Report
28 Jan	20:30	PGE Projekt Warsaw (Poland)	3–0	(France) Montpellier HSC VB	28–26	25–23	25–20			78–69	Report
10 Feb	20:00	Montpellier HSC VB (France)	3–2	(Italy) Cucine Lube Civitanova	29–27	25–22	14–25	18–25	16–14	102–113	Report
11 Feb	20:30	Volley Haasrode Leuven (Belgium)	2–3	(Poland) PGE Projekt Warsaw	18–25	25–22	25–23	19–25	7–15	94–110	Report
18 Feb	18:30	Cucine Lube Civitanova (Italy)	3–2	(Poland) PGE Projekt Warsaw	25–23	24–26	25–19	22–25	15–12	111–105	Report
18 Feb	20:30	Volley Haasrode Leuven (Belgium)	0–3	(France) Montpellier HSC VB	21–25	21–25	22–25			64–75	Report

=== First place ranking ===
Pos	Pool	Team	Pld	W	L	Pts	SW	SL	SR	SPW	SPL	SPR	Qualification
1	A	(Turkey) Ziraat Bankkart Ankara	6	6	0	18	18	3	6.000	521	449	1.160	Quarterfinals
2	C	(Italy) Sir Sicoma Monini Perugia	6	6	0	17	18	4	4.500	524	425	1.233	Quarterfinals
3	B	(Poland) Bogdanka LUK Lublin	6	6	0	15	18	7	2.571	579	498	1.163	Quarterfinals
4	D	(Poland) Aluron CMC Warta Zawiercie	6	5	1	15	15	4	3.750	474	418	1.134	Quarterfinals
5	E	(Italy) Cucine Lube Civitanova	6	5	1	15	17	5	3.400	525	420	1.250	Quarterfinals

Source: CEV

=== Second place ranking ===
Pos	Pool	Team	Pld	W	L	Pts	SW	SL	SR	SPW	SPL	SPR	Qualification
1	A	(Italy) Itas Trentino	6	4	2	11	13	10	1.300	549	537	1.022	Playoffs
2	E	(France) Montpellier HSC VB	6	4	2	10	12	10	1.200	487	498	0.978	Playoffs
3	B	(Belgium) Knack Roeselare	6	3	3	10	15	14	1.071	628	607	1.035	Playoffs
4	D	(Poland) Asseco Resovia	6	3	3	9	12	9	1.333	498	466	1.069	Playoffs
5	C	(Spain) Guaguas Las Palmas	6	3	3	8	12	14	0.857	573	582	0.985	Playoffs

Source: CEV

=== Third place ranking ===
Pos	Pool	Team	Pld	W	L	Pts	SW	SL	SR	SPW	SPL	SPR	Qualification
1	E	(Poland) PGE Projekt Warsaw	6	3	3	10	13	11	1.182	539	515	1.047	Playoffs
2	C	(Germany) Berlin Recycling Volleys	6	3	3	8	10	12	0.833	493	509	0.969	2025–26 CEV Cup
3	B	(Turkey) Galatasaray HDI	6	2	4	7	11	15	0.733	567	596	0.951	2025–26 CEV Cup
4	D	(Germany) SVG Lüneburg	6	2	4	6	7	14	0.500	461	499	0.924	2025–26 CEV Cup
5	A	(Slovenia) ACH Volley Ljubljana	6	1	5	4	6	15	0.400	446	493	0.905	2025–26 CEV Cup

Source: CEV

== Bracket ==
Playoff 6
(Poland) PGE Projekt Warsaw	2	3	15
(Italy) Itas Trentino	3	2	11
(Spain) Guaguas Las Palmas	3	2
(France) Montpellier HSC VB	1	3
(Poland) Asseco Resovia	3	3
(Belgium) Knack Roeselare	0	1

Quarterfinals
(Poland) PGE Projekt Warsaw	3	2
(Poland) Bogdanka LUK Lublin	1	3
(Spain) Guaguas Las Palmas	2	0
(Italy) Sir Sicoma Monini Perugia	3	3
(Italy) Cucine Lube Civitanova	0	0
(Poland) Aluron CMC Warta Zawiercie	3	3
(Poland) Asseco Resovia	0	0
(Turkey) Ziraat Bankkart Ankara	3	3

Semifinals
(Poland) PGE Projekt Warsaw	0
(Italy) Sir Sicoma Monini Perugia	3
(Poland) Aluron CMC Warta Zawiercie	3
(Turkey) Ziraat Bankkart Ankara	1

Final
(Italy) Sir Sicoma Monini Perugia	3
(Poland) Aluron CMC Warta Zawiercie	0
Third place
(Poland) PGE Projekt Warsaw	2
(Turkey) Ziraat Bankkart Ankara	3

== Playoff 6 ==
- The winners of the ties qualify for the quarterfinals.
- Aggregate score is counted as follows: 3 points for 3–0 or 3–1 win, 2 points for 3–2 win, 1 point for 2–3 loss.
- In case the teams are tied after two legs, a Golden Set is played immediately at the completion of the second leg.
- All times are local.

Team 1	Agg.	Team 2	1st leg	2nd leg	Golden Set
PGE Projekt Warsaw (Poland)	3–3	(Italy) Itas Trentino	2–3	3–2	15–11
Guaguas Las Palmas (Spain)	4–2	(France) Montpellier HSC VB	3–1	2–3	
Asseco Resovia (Poland)	6–0	(Belgium) Knack Roeselare	3–0	3–1	

=== First leg ===
Date	Time		Score		Set 1	Set 2	Set 3	Set 4	Set 5	Total	Report
4 Mar	20:30	PGE Projekt Warsaw (Poland)	2–3	(Italy) Itas Trentino	11–25	25–17	25–27	25–19	8–15	94–103	Report
5 Mar	19:00	Guaguas Las Palmas (Spain)	3–1	(France) Montpellier HSC VB	25–15	23–25	25–17	25–22		98–79	Report
4 Mar	18:00	Asseco Resovia (Poland)	3–0	(Belgium) Knack Roeselare	25–16	25–20	25–18			75–54	Report

=== Second leg ===
Date	Time		Score		Set 1	Set 2	Set 3	Set 4	Set 5	Total	Report
11 Mar	20:30	Itas Trentino (Italy)	2–3	(Poland) PGE Projekt Warsaw	23–25	25–19	25–19	21–25	12–15	106–103	Report
Golden set		Itas Trentino (Italy)	11–15	(Poland) PGE Projekt Warsaw							
10 Mar	20:00	Montpellier HSC VB (France)	3–2	(Spain) Guaguas Las Palmas	25–22	20–25	25–19	22–25	15–11	107–102	Report
12 Mar	20:30	Knack Roeselare (Belgium)	1–3	(Poland) Asseco Resovia	23–25	25–22	17–25	21–25		86–97	Report

== Quarterfinals ==
- The winners of the ties qualify for the final four.
- Aggregate score is counted as follows: 3 points for 3–0 or 3–1 win, 2 points for 3–2 win, 1 point for 2–3 loss.
- In case the teams are tied after two legs, a Golden Set is played immediately at the completion of the second leg.
- All times are local.

Team 1	Agg.	Team 2	1st leg	2nd leg
PGE Projekt Warsaw (Poland)	4–2	(Poland) Bogdanka LUK Lublin	3–1	2–3
Guaguas Las Palmas (Spain)	1–5	(Italy) Sir Sicoma Monini Perugia	2–3	0–3
Cucine Lube Civitanova (Italy)	0–6	(Poland) Aluron CMC Warta Zawiercie	0–3	0–3
Asseco Resovia (Poland)	0–6	(Turkey) Ziraat Bankkart Ankara	0–3	0–3

=== First leg ===
Date	Time		Score		Set 1	Set 2	Set 3	Set 4	Set 5	Total	Report
24 Mar	18:00	PGE Projekt Warsaw (Poland)	3–1	(Poland) Bogdanka LUK Lublin	25–14	23–25	26–24	25–20		99–83	Report
24 Mar	19:00	Guaguas Las Palmas (Spain)	2–3	(Italy) Sir Sicoma Monini Perugia	23–25	19–25	25–21	25–23	13–15	105–109	Report
25 Mar	20:30	Cucine Lube Civitanova (Italy)	0–3	(Poland) Aluron CMC Warta Zawiercie	22–25	16–25	29–31			67–81	Report
25 Mar	18:00	Asseco Resovia (Poland)	0–3	(Turkey) Ziraat Bankkart Ankara	21–25	23–25	20–25			64–75	Report

=== Second leg ===
Date	Time		Score		Set 1	Set 2	Set 3	Set 4	Set 5	Total	Report
1 Apr	18:00	Bogdanka LUK Lublin (Poland)	3–2	(Poland) PGE Projekt Warsaw	21–25	18–25	25–22	32–30	15–12	111–114	Report
1 Apr	20:30	Sir Sicoma Monini Perugia (Italy)	3–0	(Spain) Guaguas Las Palmas	25–18	25–21	25–23			75–62	Report
2 Apr	18:00	Aluron CMC Warta Zawiercie (Poland)	3–0	(Italy) Cucine Lube Civitanova	25–22	25–18	26–24			76–64	Report
31 Mar	19:00	Ziraat Bankkart Ankara (Turkey)	3–0	(Poland) Asseco Resovia	25–22	25–19	25–21			75–62	Report

== Final Four ==
- Place: Turin
- Time: Central European Summer Time (UTC+02:00).

=== Semifinals ===
Date	Time		Score		Set 1	Set 2	Set 3	Set 4	Set 5	Total	Report
16 May	17:00	PGE Projekt Warsaw (Poland)	0–3	(Italy) Sir Sicoma Monini Perugia	19–25	20–25	24–26			63–76	Report
16 May	20:30	Aluron CMC Warta Zawiercie (Poland)	3–1	(Turkey) Ziraat Bankkart Ankara	25–19	24–26	25–19	25–19		99–83	Report

=== 3rd place match ===
Date	Time		Score		Set 1	Set 2	Set 3	Set 4	Set 5	Total	Report
17 May	17:00	PGE Projekt Warsaw (Poland)	2–3	(Turkey) Ziraat Bankkart Ankara	25–20	23–25	25–13	23–25	11–15	107–98	Report

=== Final ===
Date	Time		Score		Set 1	Set 2	Set 3	Set 4	Set 5	Total	Report
17 May	20:30	Sir Sicoma Monini Perugia (Italy)	3–0	(Poland) Aluron CMC Warta Zawiercie	29–27	25–18	25–15			79–60	Report

== Final standings ==
Qualified for the 2026 FIVB Club World Championship

Rank	Team
1st place, gold medalist(s)	(Italy) Sir Sicoma Monini Perugia
2nd place, silver medalist(s)	(Poland) Aluron CMC Warta Zawiercie
3rd place, bronze medalist(s)	Ziraat Bankkart Ankara
4	(Poland) PGE Projekt Warsaw

2025–26 CEV Champions League winners
(Italy)
Sir Sicoma Monini Perugia
2nd title
