= Tourcoing Lille Métropole Volley-Ball =

Tourcoing-Lille Métropole Volley-Ball
- Full name: Tourcoing-Lille Métropole Volley-Ball
- Short name: TLM
- Founded: 1965
- Ground: Complexe sportif Léo Lagrange, Lille (Capacity: 3,000)
- Chairman: Pascal Lahousse
- Manager: Dorian Rougeyron
- League: LNV Ligue A
- 2023–24: 3rd place
- Website: Club home page

Uniforms
Home	Away

Tourcoing Lille Métropole Volley-Ball is a sport association. The volley-ball section was created in 1912 in Tourcoing. The main team is playing in the French main league, called "LNV Ligue A".

== Honours & achievements ==
=== Domestic competitions ===
French League

- 2005: 2nd of the regular season, semi finals in playoffs
- 2004: 3rd of the regular season, semi finals in playoffs
- 2003: 2nd of the regular season, semi finals in playoffs
- 2002: 6th of the regular season, Vice-champion de France
- 2001: 3rd of the regular season, Vice-champion de France
- 2000: 2nd of the regular season, semi finals in playoffs

French Cup

- 2005: Finalist
- 2004: 3rd
- 2003: Finalist
- 2001: Finalist
- 1999: Finalist
- 1998: Finalist

=== European competitions ===
CEV Cup

- 2005: 3rd
- 2003: 4th

== Roster ==
=== Season 2023-2024 ===
No.	Name	Date of birth	Position
1	(France) Edouard Louchart	27 February 2003 (age 22)	setter
7	(Argentina) Matías Giraudo	13 March 1998 (age 27)	setter
6	(France) Tom Lavigne	9 May 2002 (age 22)	opposite
16	(Argentina) Pablo Kukartsev	25 March 1993 (age 32)	opposite
3	(Bulgaria) Petar Hristoskov	19 February 1998 (age 27)	opposite
4	(Brazil) Robson Rodrigues	14 October 1995 (age 29)	outside hitter
8	(France) Clément Le Moal	19 March 2001 (age 24)	outside hitter
17	(Canada) Ryley Barnes	11 October 1993 (age 31)	outside hitter
19	(Argentina) Gonzalo Quiroga	25 February 1993 (age 32)	outside hitter
9	(Norway) Rune Fasteland	17 May 1995 (age 29)	middle blocker
11	(France) Simon Roehrig	19 November 2000 (age 24)	middle blocker
13	(France) Tomasi Luaki	15 February 1998 (age 27)	middle blocker
14	(Latvia) Gustavs Freimanis	22 September 2002 (age 22)	middle blocker
2	(France) Thibaut Loubeyre	16 April 2001 (age 23)	libero
15	(France) Quentin Dalle	14 May 1999 (age 25)	libero
Head coach:		(France) Dorian Rougeyron	
