= MOK Mursa Osijek =

- Full name: Muški Odbojkaški Klub; Mursa Osijek
- Founded: 2002
- Ground: Gradski vrt Hall (Gradski vrt) (Capacity: 1,448 - small hall)
- Manager: Mario Teppert
- League: Croatian 1A Volleyball League

MOK Mursa Osijek is a Croatian men's volleyball club based in Osijek, Croatia. It was established in 2002.

It plays in the Croatian 1A Volleyball League.

MOK Mursa plays domestic matches at small hall of Gradski vrt Hall. Small hall has a capacity of 1,448 attendants.

== Honours ==
- Croatian Volleyball Cup: 1
  - 2011
