= OK Napredak Odžak =

- Short name: OK Napredak Odžak
- Founded: 1973
- Website: Club home page

Uniforms
Home	Away

OK Napredak Odžak (also known as HOK Napredak) is a volleyball club from Odžak, Bosnia and Herzegovina. It currently competes in the Superleague of the Federation of Bosnia and Herzegovina, the second tier volleyball league of Bosnia and Herzegovina.

== History ==
The modern club was reestablished by Bosnian Croats after the nation's war in 1997 and played in the Croatian Herzeg-Bosnia First League of Volleyball. By 2000, they became league champions.

In 2001, the club joined the Volleyball Federation of Bosnia and Herzegovina and began to play in the new national league. In its first season competing, 2001-02, Napredak was national champion and has been one of the top clubs since, as champions again in 2006-07 and finishing third in 2007-08 and second in 2008-09 and 2009-10.

Napredak's fans are known as Uragan. The team used play its matches near Modriča while an arena was being built in Odžak itself.

== Honours ==
- Bosnia and Herzegovina Championship:
  - Winners (2): 2002, 2007
  - Runner-up (2): 2009, 2010
- Herzeg-Bosnia Championship:
  - Winners (1): 2000

== Recent seasons ==
The recent season-by-season performance of the club:

Season	Division	Tier	Position
2017–18	Superleague (North)	II	3rd
2018-19	Superleague (North)	II	4th
2019–20	Superleague (North)	II	7th ↓

Key

↑ Promoted	↓ Relegated

== Notable players ==
- (Bosnia and Herzegovina) Almir Aganović
