= ACH Volley =

Slovenian professional men's volleyball club

- Nickname: Oranžni zmaji (The Orange Dragons)
- Founded: 1970; 56 years ago (as Odbojkarski klub Bled)
- Ground: Tivoli Hall (Capacity: 4,500)
- Chairman: Rasto Oderlap
- Manager: Igor Kolaković
- League: Slovenian League
- 2025–26: Regular season: 1st Playoffs: Champions
- Website: Club home page
- Championships: 2000, 2005, 2006, 2007, 2008, 2009, 2010, 2011, 2012, 2013, 2014, 2015, 2016, 2017, 2018, 2019, 2020, 2022, 2023, 2024, 2025, 2026

Uniforms
Home	Away

ACH Volley is a Slovenian professional men's volleyball club based in Ljubljana that competes in the Slovenian League. They play their home matches at Tivoli Hall. The club was founded in 1970 and was based in Bled until 2011, when the team relocated to Ljubljana.

ACH have won the Slovenian championship a record 22 times, including 16 consecutive titles between 2005 and 2020. The club also won the CEV Top Teams Cup in 2007 and reached the final four of the CEV Champions League in 2010.

== Honours ==
=== Domestic ===
- Slovenian League
  - Winners (22): 1999–2000, 2004–05, 2005–06, 2006–07, 2007–08, 2008–09, 2009–10, 2010–11, 2011–12, 2012–13, 2013–14, 2014–15, 2015–16, 2016–17, 2017–18, 2018–19, 2019–20, 2021–22, 2022–23, 2023–24, 2024–25, 2025–26
- Slovenian Volleyball Cup
  - Winners (16): 2004–05, 2006–07, 2007–08, 2008–09, 2009–10, 2010–11, 2011–12, 2012–13, 2014–15, 2017–18, 2018–19, 2019–20, 2021–22, 2022–23, 2024–25, 2025–26
- Slovenian Volleyball Supercup
  - Winners (1): 2026

=== Regional ===
- MEVZA League
  - Winners (14): 2006–07, 2007–08, 2009–10, 2010–11, 2012–13, 2013–14, 2015–16, 2016–17, 2018–19, 2019–20, 2020–21, 2021–22, 2022–23, 2024–25

=== European ===
- CEV Champions League
  - Final Four (1): 2009–10
- CEV Top Teams Cup
  - Winners (1): 2006–07
