= 2026–27 CEV Women's Challenge Cup =

European volleyball tournament

- League: CEV Women's Challenge Cup
- Sport: Volleyball
- Duration: 27 October 2026 – 17 March 2027
- Matches: 108
- Teams: 55

CEV Women's Challenge Cup seasons
- ← 2025–26 2027–28 →

The 2026–27 CEV Women's Challenge Cup is the 47th edition of the European CEV Challenge Cup volleyball club tournament organised by the European Volleyball Confederation.

== Format ==
The CEV Challenge Cup is played in a knockout format. Each team plays a home and an away match. The team that wins both matches advances to the next round. If the teams win one match each, a Golden Set is played immediately at the completion of the second leg. The Golden Set winner is the team that first obtains 15 points, provided that the points difference between the two teams is at least 2 points (thus, the Golden Set is similar to a tiebreak set in a regular match).

Qualification round (Home and away matches):

- 32nd finals

Main phase (Home and away matches):

- 16th finals → 8th finals → Quarterfinals

Final phase (Home and away matches):

- Semifinals → Finals

== Participating teams ==
55 teams participate in the 2026–27 edition of the tournament. 46 teams were allocated slots in the qualification round and 9 teams were allocated direct slots in the 16th finals.

Rank	Country	No. of teams	Teams
1	Italy	1	Megabox Group Vallefoglia (Note: Megabox Vallefoglia replaced Chieri '76, which received a wild card to the 2026–27 CEV Cup.)
2	Romania	2	CSM București, CSM Corona Brașov
3	France	1	Virtus Le Cannet
4	Turkey	1	Aras Kargo SK Izmir (Note: Aras Kargo SK replaced Galatasaray, which received a wild card to the 2026–27 CEV Champions League.)
5	Greece	5	AEK Athens, AO Thiras, Olympiacos Piraeus (Note: Olympiacos Piraeus qualified by winning the 2026 BVA Cup.), Panathinaikos Athens, Zaon Kifissia 1962
6	Germany	1	USC Münster
7	Poland	1	ŁKS Commercecon Łódź
8	Serbia	1	Železničar Lajkovac
9	Switzerland	4	Biwi VFM Franches-Montagnes, Sm'Aesch Pfeffingen, VC Kanti Schaffhausen, Volley Düdingen Power Cats
10	Spain	2	Avarca de Menorca, Tenerife Libby's La Laguna
11	Czech Republic	3	Šelmy Brno, VK Lvi Praha, VK Prostějov
12	Hungary	1	UTE Budapest
13	Belgium	3	Charleroi Volley, Darta Bevo Roeselare, SAB Diving Brabo Antwerp
14	Portugal	3	Sport Lisboa e Benfica, Sporting Clube de Braga, Sporting CP Lisboa
15	Croatia	2	OK Dinamo Zagreb, OK Marina Kaštela
18	Netherlands	4	Apollo 8 Borne, Draisma Dynamo Apeldoorn, Sliedrecht Sport, Sudosa Assen
19	Slovenia	1	GEN-I Volley Nova Gorica
20	Finland	1	Pfeifer Kuusamo
21	Bulgaria	1	Levski Sofia
21	Israel	2	Maccabi Ashdod, Maccabi XT Haifa
24	Bosnia and Herzegovina	2	OK ORT Novo Sarajevo, ŽOK Borac Banja Luka
25	Montenegro	1	Budućnost Podgorica
26	Slovakia	2	VA Uniza Žilina, VK Slovan Bratislava
27	Norway	2	Førde VBK, TIF Viking Bergen
28	Denmark	2	ASV Aarhus, Holte IF
29	Azerbaijan	1	DH Volley Baku
30	Cyprus	1	Olympiada Neapolis Nicosia
31	Lithuania	1	Kaunas VDU
33	North Macedonia	2	Janta Volej Kisela Voda, Rabotnicki Skopje
34	Luxembourg	1	CS GYM Volley Luxembourg

== Bracket ==
The drawing of lots was held on 15 July 2026 in Luxembourg City.

32nd finals
(Slovakia) VK Slovan	3	3
(Montenegro) Budućnost	0	2
(North Macedonia) Janta Volej	0	0
(Czech Republic) VK Lvi Praha	3	3
(Croatia) Dinamo Zagreb	3	3
(Cyprus) Olympiada	2	0
(Netherlands) Apollo 8 Borne	3	3
(Bulgaria) Levski Sofia	0	1
(Greece) Olympiacos	3	3
(Portugal) S.L. Benfica	2	2
(Netherlands) Sudosa Assen	3	3
(Luxembourg) CS GYM Volley	0	1
(Czech Republic) Šelmy Brno	3	3
(Slovakia) VA Uniza Žilina	1	2
(Israel) Maccabi XT Haifa	1	0
(Spain) T.L. La Laguna	3	3
(Denmark) Holte IF	1	0
(Azerbaijan) DH Volley	3	3
(Bosnia and Herzegovina) ŽOK Borac	0	0
(Finland) Pfeifer Kuusamo	3	3
(Switzerland) Sm'Aesch	3	3
(Croatia) Marina Kaštela	0	0
(Greece) Panathinaikos	3	3
(Romania) CSM București	0	1
(Switzerland) Biwi VFM	3	2	8
(Bosnia and Herzegovina) OK ORT NS	0	3	15
(Switzerland) VC Kanti	1	1
(Hungary) UTE Budapest	3	3
(Spain) Ava. de Menorca	3	3
(Lithuania) Kaunas VDU	1	0
(Portugal) Sporting CP	1	2
(Israel) Maccabi Ashdod	3	3
(Belgium) Charleroi Volley	3	2	11
(Belgium) Bevo Roeselare	1	3	15
(Greece) ZAON Kifissia	3	3
(North Macedonia) Rabotnicki	0	0
(Netherlands) Draisma Dynamo	3	3
(Norway) TIF Viking	1	0
(Portugal) SC Braga	3	3
(Denmark) ASV Aarhus	0	0
(Czech Republic) VK Prostějov	3	1	17
(Slovenia) GEN-I Volley	2	3	19
(Belgium) Brabo Antwerp	2	0
(Netherlands) Sliedrecht Sport	3	3
(Norway) Førde VBK	0	0
(Greece) AEK Athens	3	3

16th finals
(Slovakia) VK Slovan
(Czech Republic) VK Lvi Praha
(Croatia) Dinamo Zagreb
(Germany) USC Münster
(Netherlands) Apollo 8 Borne
(Greece) Olympiacos
(Netherlands) Sudosa Assen
(France) Virtus Le Cannet
(Czech Republic) Šelmy Brno
(Spain) T.L. La Laguna
(Azerbaijan) DH Volley
(Poland) ŁKS Łódź
(Finland) Pfeifer Kuusamo
(Switzerland) Sm'Aesch
(Greece) Panathinaikos
(Romania) Corona Brașov
(Bosnia and Herzegovina) OK ORT NS
(Hungary) UTE Budapest
(Spain) Ava. de Menorca
(Greece) AO Thiras
(Israel) Maccabi Ashdod
(Belgium) Bevo Roeselare
(Greece) ZAON Kifissia
(Turkey) Aras Kargo SK
(Netherlands) Draisma Dynamo
(Switzerland) Volley Düdingen
(Portugal) SC Braga
(Serbia) Železničar
(Slovenia) GEN-I Volley
(Netherlands) Sliedrecht Sport
(Greece) AEK Athens
(Italy) Megabox

8th finals

Quarterfinals

Semifinals

Finals

== Qualification round ==
=== 32nd finals ===
- The winners of the ties qualify for the 16th finals.
- In case the teams are tied after two legs, a Golden Set is played immediately at the completion of the second leg.
- All times are local.

Team 1	Agg.	Team 2	1st leg	2nd leg	Golden Set
VK Slovan Bratislava (Slovakia)	2–0	(Montenegro) Budućnost Podgorica	3–0	3–2	
Janta Volej Kisela Voda (North Macedonia)	0–2	(Czech Republic) VK Lvi Praha	0–3	0–3	
OK Dinamo Zagreb (Croatia)	2–0	(Cyprus) Olympiada Neapolis Nicosia	3–2	3–0	
Apollo 8 Borne (Netherlands)	2–0	(Bulgaria) Levski Sofia	3–0	3–1	
Olympiacos Piraeus (Greece)	2–0	(Portugal) Sport Lisboa e Benfica	3–2	3–2	
Sudosa Assen (Netherlands)	2–0	CS GYM Volley Luxembourg	3–0	3–1	
Šelmy Brno (Czech Republic)	2–0	(Slovakia) VA Uniza Žilina	3–1	3–2	
Maccabi XT Haifa (Israel)	0–2	(Spain) Tenerife Libby's La Laguna	1–3	0–3	
Holte IF (Denmark)	0–2	(Azerbaijan) DH Volley Baku	1–3	0–3	
ŽOK Borac Banja Luka (Bosnia and Herzegovina)	0–2	(Finland) Pfeifer Kuusamo	0–3	0–3	
Sm'Aesch Pfeffingen (Switzerland)	2–0	(Croatia) OK Marina Kaštela	3–0	3–0	
Panathinaikos Athens (Greece)	2–0	(Romania) CSM București	3–0	3–1	
Biwi VFM Franches-Montagnes (Switzerland)	1–1	(Bosnia and Herzegovina) OK ORT Novo Sarajevo	3–0	2–3	8–15
VC Kanti Schaffhausen (Switzerland)	0–2	(Hungary) UTE Budapest	1–3	1–3	
Avarca de Menorca (Spain)	2–0	(Lithuania) Kaunas VDU	3–1	3–0	
Sporting CP Lisboa (Portugal)	0–2	(Israel) Maccabi Ashdod	1–3	2–3	
Charleroi Volley (Belgium)	1–1	(Belgium) Darta Bevo Roeselare	3–1	2–3	11–15
Zaon Kifissia 1962 (Greece)	2–0	(North Macedonia) Rabotnicki Skopje	3–0	3–0	
Draisma Dynamo Apeldoorn (Netherlands)	2–0	(Norway) TIF Viking Bergen	3–1	3–0	
Sporting Clube de Braga (Portugal)	2–0	(Denmark) ASV Aarhus	3–0	3–0	
VK Prostějov (Czech Republic)	1–1	(Slovenia) GEN-I Volley Nova Gorica	3–2	1–3	17–19
SAB Diving Brabo Antwerp (Belgium)	0–2	(Netherlands) Sliedrecht Sport	2–3	0–3	
Førde VBK (Norway)	0–2	(Greece) AEK Athens	0–3	0–3	

==== First leg ====
Date	Time		Score		Set 1	Set 2	Set 3	Set 4	Set 5	Total	Report
28 Oct	19:00	VK Slovan Bratislava (Slovakia)	3–0	(Montenegro) Budućnost Podgorica	25–22	25–21	25–18			75–61	Report
27 Oct	19:30	Janta Volej Kisela Voda (North Macedonia)	0–3	(Czech Republic) VK Lvi Praha	17–25	6–25	15–25			38–75	Report
3 Nov	18:00	OK Dinamo Zagreb (Croatia)	3–2	(Cyprus) Olympiada Neapolis Nicosia	25–20	21–25	25–15	16–25	15–9	102–94	Report
28 Oct	20:00	Apollo 8 Borne (Netherlands)	3–0	(Bulgaria) Levski Sofia	25–18	25–17	25–8			75–43	Report
27 Oct	18:30	Olympiacos Piraeus (Greece)	3–2	(Portugal) Sport Lisboa e Benfica	16–25	23–25	25–15	25–22	15–10	104–97	Report
27 Oct	20:00	Sudosa Assen (Netherlands)	3–0	CS GYM Volley Luxembourg	25–18	25–14	25–13			75–45	Report
28 Oct	18:00	Šelmy Brno (Czech Republic)	3–1	(Slovakia) VA Uniza Žilina	25–22	25–21	23–25	25–12		98–80	Report
3 Nov	18:00	Maccabi XT Haifa (Israel)	1–3	(Spain) Tenerife Libby's La Laguna	12–25	17–25	26–24	17–25		72–99	Report
27 Oct	19:00	Holte IF (Denmark)	1–3	(Azerbaijan) DH Volley Baku	14–25	24–26	25–22	22–25		85–98	Report
28 Oct	19:00	ŽOK Borac Banja Luka (Bosnia and Herzegovina)	0–3	(Finland) Pfeifer Kuusamo	17–25	17–25	18–25			52–75	Report
27 Oct	19:30	Sm'Aesch Pfeffingen (Switzerland)	3–0	(Croatia) OK Marina Kaštela	25–14	25–19	25–18			75–51	Report
28 Oct	18:00	Panathinaikos Athens (Greece)	3–0	(Romania) CSM București	25–18	25–18	25–19			75–55	Report
29 Oct	20:00	Biwi VFM Franches-Montagnes (Switzerland)	3–0	(Bosnia and Herzegovina) OK ORT Novo Sarajevo	25–16	25–19	26–24			76–59	Report
28 Oct	19:30	VC Kanti Schaffhausen (Switzerland)	1–3	(Hungary) UTE Budapest	21–25	25–21	16–25	21–25		83–96	Report
28 Oct	20:00	Avarca de Menorca (Spain)	3–1	(Lithuania) Kaunas VDU	16–25	25–15	25–15	25–17		91–72	Report
3 Nov	19:30	Sporting CP Lisboa (Portugal)	1–3	(Israel) Maccabi Ashdod	23–25	14–25	26–24	23–25		86–99	Report
28 Oct	20:00	Charleroi Volley (Belgium)	3–1	(Belgium) Darta Bevo Roeselare	27–25	16–25	25–20	25–20		93–90	Report
27 Oct	18:00	Zaon Kifissia 1962 (Greece)	3–0	(North Macedonia) Rabotnicki Skopje	25–17	25–15	25–17			75–49	Report
28 Oct	19:00	TIF Viking Bergen (Norway)	1–3	(Netherlands) Draisma Dynamo Apeldoorn	25–22	20–25	14–25	26–28		85–100	Report
27 Oct	20:30	Sporting Clube de Braga (Portugal)	3–0	(Denmark) ASV Aarhus	25–14	25–14	27–25			77–53	Report
28 Oct	18:00	VK Prostějov (Czech Republic)	3–2	(Slovenia) GEN-I Volley Nova Gorica	22–25	25–21	25–21	21–25	15–13	108–105	Report
28 Oct	20:00	SAB Diving Brabo Antwerp (Belgium)	2–3	(Netherlands) Sliedrecht Sport	27–25	25–23	24–26	13–25	11–15	100–114	Report
27 Oct	19:30	Førde VBK (Norway)	0–3	(Greece) AEK Athens	10–25	14–25	13–25			37–75	Report

==== Second leg ====
Date	Time		Score		Set 1	Set 2	Set 3	Set 4	Set 5	Total	Report
3 Nov	18:00	Budućnost Podgorica (Montenegro)	2–3	(Slovakia) VK Slovan Bratislava	25–23	16–25	16–25	25–21	15–17	97–111	Report
4 Nov	18:00	VK Lvi Praha (Czech Republic)	3–0	(North Macedonia) Janta Volej Kisela Voda	25–11	25–12	25–14			75–37	Report
4 Nov	20:00	Olympiada Neapolis Nicosia (Cyprus)	0–3	(Croatia) OK Dinamo Zagreb	25–27	21–25	18–25			64–77	Report
4 Nov	18:00	Levski Sofia (Bulgaria)	1–3	(Netherlands) Apollo 8 Borne	19–25	25–20	14–25	10–25		68–95	Report
4 Nov	20:45	Sport Lisboa e Benfica (Portugal)	2–3	(Greece) Olympiacos Piraeus	25–22	23–25	25–22	26–28	16–18	115–115	Report
3 Nov	19:30	CS GYM Volley Luxembourg	1–3	(Netherlands) Sudosa Assen	25–22	20–25	16–25	18–25		79–97	Report
4 Nov	19:00	VA Uniza Žilina (Slovakia)	2–3	(Czech Republic) Šelmy Brno	23–25	25–19	25–16	17–25	10–15	100–100	Report
5 Nov	18:00	Tenerife Libby's La Laguna (Spain)	3–0	(Israel) Maccabi XT Haifa	25–15	25–17	25–16			75–48	Report
5 Nov	18:00	DH Volley Baku (Azerbaijan)	3–0	(Denmark) Holte IF	26–24	25–21	25–14			76–59	Report
4 Nov	18:30	Pfeifer Kuusamo (Finland)	3–0	(Bosnia and Herzegovina) ŽOK Borac Banja Luka	25–21	25–15	25–12			75–48	Report
3 Nov	18:00	OK Marina Kaštela (Croatia)	0–3	(Switzerland) Sm'Aesch Pfeffingen	18–25	19–25	16–25			53–75	Report
4 Nov	16:00	CSM București (Romania)	1–3	(Greece) Panathinaikos Athens	25–22	17–25	18–25	15–25		75–97	Report
4 Nov	20:00	OK ORT Novo Sarajevo (Bosnia and Herzegovina)	3–2	(Switzerland) Biwi VFM Franches-Montagnes	16–25	25–23	23–25	25–20	15–13	104–106	Report
Golden set		OK ORT Novo Sarajevo (Bosnia and Herzegovina)	15–8	(Switzerland) Biwi VFM Franches-Montagnes							
4 Nov	19:00	UTE Budapest (Hungary)	3–1	(Switzerland) VC Kanti Schaffhausen	25–17	25–12	23–25	25–20		98–74	Report
4 Nov	18:30	Kaunas VDU (Lithuania)	0–3	(Spain) Avarca de Menorca	23–25	21–25	20–25			64–75	Report
4 Nov	19:30	Maccabi Ashdod (Israel)	3–2	(Portugal) Sporting CP Lisboa	28–26	25–22	22–25	15–25	15–8	105–106	Report
5 Nov	20:00	Darta Bevo Roeselare (Belgium)	3–2	(Belgium) Charleroi Volley	25–11	19–25	22–25	25–17	16–14	107–92	Report
Golden set		Darta Bevo Roeselare (Belgium)	15–11	(Belgium) Charleroi Volley							
3 Nov	19:00	Rabotnicki Skopje (North Macedonia)	0–3	(Greece) Zaon Kifissia 1962	9–25	10–25	17–25			36–75	Report
5 Nov	19:30	Draisma Dynamo Apeldoorn (Netherlands)	3–0	(Norway) TIF Viking Bergen	25–14	25–8	25–10			75–32	Report
3 Nov	20:00	ASV Aarhus (Denmark)	0–3	(Portugal) Sporting Clube de Braga	20–25	22–25	18–25			60–75	Report
4 Nov	19:00	GEN-I Volley Nova Gorica (Slovenia)	3–1	(Czech Republic) VK Prostějov	23–25	25–20	25–18	25–19		98–82	Report
Golden set		GEN-I Volley Nova Gorica (Slovenia)	19–17	(Czech Republic) VK Prostějov							
4 Nov	20:00	Sliedrecht Sport (Netherlands)	3–0	(Belgium) SAB Diving Brabo Antwerp	25–11	25–21	25–9			75–41	Report
28 Oct	19:30	AEK Athens (Greece)	3–0	(Norway) Førde VBK	25–18	25–17	25–17			75–52	Report

== Main phase ==
=== 16th finals ===
- The winners of the ties qualify for the 8th finals.
- In case the teams are tied after two legs, a Golden Set is played immediately at the completion of the second leg.
- All times are local.

Team 1	Agg.	Team 2	1st leg	2nd leg
VK Slovan Bratislava (Slovakia)	–	(Czech Republic) VK Lvi Praha	–	–
OK Dinamo Zagreb (Croatia)	–	(Germany) USC Münster	–	–
Apollo 8 Borne (Netherlands)	–	(Greece) Olympiacos Piraeus	–	–
Sudosa Assen (Netherlands)	–	(France) Virtus Le Cannet	–	–
Šelmy Brno (Czech Republic)	–	(Spain) Tenerife Libby's La Laguna	–	–
DH Volley Baku (Azerbaijan)	–	(Poland) ŁKS Commercecon Łódź	–	–
Pfeifer Kuusamo (Finland)	–	(Switzerland) Sm'Aesch Pfeffingen	–	–
Panathinaikos Athens (Greece)	–	(Romania) CSM Corona Brașov	–	–
OK ORT Novo Sarajevo (Bosnia and Herzegovina)	–	(Hungary) UTE Budapest	–	–
Avarca de Menorca (Spain)	–	(Greece) AO Thiras	–	–
Maccabi Ashdod (Israel)	–	(Belgium) Darta Bevo Roeselare	–	–
Zaon Kifissia 1962 (Greece)	–	(Turkey) Aras Kargo SK Izmir	–	–
Draisma Dynamo Apeldoorn (Netherlands)	–	(Switzerland) Volley Düdingen Power Cats	–	–
Sporting Clube de Braga (Portugal)	–	(Serbia) Železničar Lajkovac	–	–
GEN-I Volley Nova Gorica (Slovenia)	–	(Netherlands) Sliedrecht Sport	–	–
AEK Athens (Greece)	–	(Italy) Megabox Group Vallefoglia	–	–

==== First leg ====
Date	Time		Score		Set 1	Set 2	Set 3	Set 4	Set 5	Total	Report
24 Nov	19:00	VK Slovan Bratislava (Slovakia)	–	(Czech Republic) VK Lvi Praha	–	–	–			0–0	Report
24 Nov	18:30	OK Dinamo Zagreb (Croatia)	–	(Germany) USC Münster	–	–	–			0–0	Report
26 Nov	19:00	Apollo 8 Borne (Netherlands)	–	(Greece) Olympiacos Piraeus	–	–	–			0–0	Report
24 Nov	20:00	Sudosa Assen (Netherlands)	–	(France) Virtus Le Cannet	–	–	–			0–0	Report
24 Nov	18:00	Šelmy Brno (Czech Republic)	–	(Spain) Tenerife Libby's La Laguna	–	–	–			0–0	Report
26 Nov	18:00	DH Volley Baku (Azerbaijan)	–	(Poland) ŁKS Commercecon Łódź	–	–	–			0–0	Report
25 Nov	18:30	Pfeifer Kuusamo (Finland)	–	(Switzerland) Sm'Aesch Pfeffingen	–	–	–			0–0	Report
25 Nov	18:00	Panathinaikos Athens (Greece)	–	(Romania) CSM Corona Brașov	–	–	–			0–0	Report
24 Nov	20:00	OK ORT Novo Sarajevo (Bosnia and Herzegovina)	–	(Hungary) UTE Budapest	–	–	–			0–0	Report
25 Nov	20:00	Avarca de Menorca (Spain)	–	(Greece) AO Thiras	–	–	–			0–0	Report
1 Dec	20:00	Maccabi Ashdod (Israel)	–	(Belgium) Darta Bevo Roeselare	–	–	–			0–0	Report
25 Nov	19:00	Zaon Kifissia 1962 (Greece)	–	(Turkey) Aras Kargo SK Izmir	–	–	–			0–0	Report
26 Nov	19:30	Draisma Dynamo Apeldoorn (Netherlands)	–	(Switzerland) Volley Düdingen Power Cats	–	–	–			0–0	Report
25 Nov	20:30	Sporting Clube de Braga (Portugal)	–	(Serbia) Železničar Lajkovac	–	–	–			0–0	Report
25 Nov	19:00	GEN-I Volley Nova Gorica (Slovenia)	–	(Netherlands) Sliedrecht Sport	–	–	–			0–0	Report
25 Nov	19:00	AEK Athens (Greece)	–	(Italy) Megabox Group Vallefoglia	–	–	–			0–0	Report

==== Second leg ====
Date	Time		Score		Set 1	Set 2	Set 3	Set 4	Set 5	Total	Report
1 Dec	18:00	VK Lvi Praha (Czech Republic)	–	(Slovakia) VK Slovan Bratislava	–	–	–			0–0	Report
2 Dec	19:00	USC Münster (Germany)	–	(Croatia) OK Dinamo Zagreb	–	–	–			0–0	Report
1 Dec	19:00	Olympiacos Piraeus (Greece)	–	(Netherlands) Apollo 8 Borne	–	–	–			0–0	Report
1 Dec	19:30	Virtus Le Cannet (France)	–	(Netherlands) Sudosa Assen	–	–	–			0–0	Report
2 Dec	18:00	Tenerife Libby's La Laguna (Spain)	–	(Czech Republic) Šelmy Brno	–	–	–			0–0	Report
2 Dec	18:00	ŁKS Commercecon Łódź (Poland)	–	(Azerbaijan) DH Volley Baku	–	–	–			0–0	Report
2 Dec	19:30	Sm'Aesch Pfeffingen (Switzerland)	–	(Finland) Pfeifer Kuusamo	–	–	–			0–0	Report
2 Dec	19:00	CSM Corona Brașov (Romania)	–	(Greece) Panathinaikos Athens	–	–	–			0–0	Report
2 Dec	18:00	UTE Budapest (Hungary)	–	(Bosnia and Herzegovina) OK ORT Novo Sarajevo	–	–	–			0–0	Report
3 Dec	19:00	AO Thiras (Greece)	–	(Spain) Avarca de Menorca	–	–	–			0–0	Report
2 Dec	20:00	Darta Bevo Roeselare (Belgium)	–	(Israel) Maccabi Ashdod	–	–	–			0–0	Report
2 Dec	18:00	Aras Kargo SK Izmir (Turkey)	–	(Greece) Zaon Kifissia 1962	–	–	–			0–0	Report
2 Dec	20:00	Volley Düdingen Power Cats (Switzerland)	–	(Netherlands) Draisma Dynamo Apeldoorn	–	–	–			0–0	Report
2 Dec	19:00	Železničar Lajkovac (Serbia)	–	(Portugal) Sporting Clube de Braga	–	–	–			0–0	Report
2 Dec	20:00	Sliedrecht Sport (Netherlands)	–	(Slovenia) GEN-I Volley Nova Gorica	–	–	–			0–0	Report
2 Dec	20:00	Megabox Group Vallefoglia (Italy)	–	(Greece) AEK Athens	–	–	–			0–0	Report

=== 8th finals ===
- The winners of the ties qualify for the quarterfinals.
- In case the teams are tied after two legs, a Golden Set is played immediately at the completion of the second leg.
- All times are local.

Team 1	Agg.	Team 2	1st leg	2nd leg
	–		–	–
	–		–	–
	–		–	–
	–		–	–
	–		–	–
	–		–	–
	–		–	–
	–		–	–

==== First leg ====
Date	Time	Score	Set 1	Set 2	Set 3	Set 4	Set 5	Total	Report
15–17 Dec		–	–	–	–			0–0	Report
15–17 Dec		–	–	–	–			0–0	Report
15–17 Dec		–	–	–	–			0–0	Report
15–17 Dec		–	–	–	–			0–0	Report
15–17 Dec		–	–	–	–			0–0	Report
15–17 Dec		–	–	–	–			0–0	Report
15–17 Dec		–	–	–	–			0–0	Report
15–17 Dec		–	–	–	–			0–0	Report

==== Second leg ====
Date	Time	Score	Set 1	Set 2	Set 3	Set 4	Set 5	Total	Report
12–14 Jan		–	–	–	–			0–0	Report
12–14 Jan		–	–	–	–			0–0	Report
12–14 Jan		–	–	–	–			0–0	Report
12–14 Jan		–	–	–	–			0–0	Report
12–14 Jan		–	–	–	–			0–0	Report
12–14 Jan		–	–	–	–			0–0	Report
12–14 Jan		–	–	–	–			0–0	Report
12–14 Jan		–	–	–	–			0–0	Report

=== Quarterfinals ===
- The winners of the ties qualify for the semifinals.
- In case the teams are tied after two legs, a Golden Set is played immediately at the completion of the second leg.
- All times are local.

Team 1	Agg.	Team 2	1st leg	2nd leg
	–		–	–
	–		–	–
	–		–	–
	–		–	–

==== First leg ====
Date	Time	Score	Set 1	Set 2	Set 3	Set 4	Set 5	Total	Report
26–28 Jan		–	–	–	–			0–0	Report
26–28 Jan		–	–	–	–			0–0	Report
26–28 Jan		–	–	–	–			0–0	Report
26–28 Jan		–	–	–	–			0–0	Report

==== Second leg ====
Date	Time	Score	Set 1	Set 2	Set 3	Set 4	Set 5	Total	Report
2–4 Feb		–	–	–	–			0–0	Report
2–4 Feb		–	–	–	–			0–0	Report
2–4 Feb		–	–	–	–			0–0	Report
2–4 Feb		–	–	–	–			0–0	Report

== Final phase ==
=== Semifinals ===
- The winners of the ties qualify for the finals.
- In case the teams are tied after two legs, a Golden Set is played immediately at the completion of the second leg.
- All times are local.

Team 1	Agg.	Team 2	1st leg	2nd leg
	–		–	–
	–		–	–

==== First leg ====
Date	Time	Score	Set 1	Set 2	Set 3	Set 4	Set 5	Total	Report
16–18 Feb		–	–	–	–			0–0	Report
16–18 Feb		–	–	–	–			0–0	Report

==== Second leg ====
Date	Time	Score	Set 1	Set 2	Set 3	Set 4	Set 5	Total	Report
23–25 Feb		–	–	–	–			0–0	Report
23–25 Feb		–	–	–	–			0–0	Report

=== Finals ===
- In case the teams are tied after two legs, a Golden Set is played immediately at the completion of the second leg.
- All times are local.

Team 1	Agg.	Team 2	1st leg	2nd leg
	–		–	–

==== First leg ====
Date	Time	Score	Set 1	Set 2	Set 3	Set 4	Set 5	Total	Report
10 Mar		–	–	–	–			0–0	Report

==== Second leg ====
Date	Time	Score	Set 1	Set 2	Set 3	Set 4	Set 5	Total	Report
17 Mar		–	–	–	–			0–0	Report

== Final standings ==
Rank	Team
1st place, gold medalist(s)	
2nd place, silver medalist(s)	
Semifinalists	
