= 2025–26 CEV Women's Champions League qualification =

The 2025–26 CEV Women's Champions League qualification was played between 22 October and 13 November 2025. Eleven teams registered for these qualification rounds of the 2025–26 CEV Women's Champions League. Four of the teams joined the sixteen teams already qualified for the league round. The seven eliminated teams competed in the 2025–26 CEV Cup.

== Teams ==
The participating teams in the qualification phase started in the second or third round, depending on the ranking of their national federation. The drawing of lots was held on 15 July 2025 in Luxembourg City.

Rank	Country	Points	Starts in	Qualified team
6	France (Note: One of France's two regular slots was changed to a qualification slot following the withdrawal by Neptunes Nantes, the second placed team in the 2024–25 season of the French volleyball league.)	210.34	3rd round	Volero Le Cannet
10	Hungary	87.33	3rd round	Vasas Óbuda Budapest
11	Bulgaria	77.00	3rd round	Maritza Plovdiv
12	Slovenia	73.00	3rd round	OTP Banka Branik Maribor
13	Spain	60.33	2nd round	CD Heidelberg Las Palmas
14	Croatia	57.00	2nd round	OK Dinamo Zagreb
15	Belgium	47.00	2nd round	Asterix Avo Beveren
18	Bosnia and Herzegovina	33.00	2nd round	ŽOK Gacko RD Swisslion
19	Greece	32.00	2nd round	Olympiacos Piraeus
N/A	North Macedonia	0.00	2nd round	Janta Volej Kisela Voda
N/A	Portugal	0.00	2nd round	Sport Lisboa e Benfica

== Second round ==
- The winners of the ties qualify for the third round.
- In case the teams are tied after two legs, a Golden Set is played immediately at the completion of the second leg.
- All times are local.

Team 1	Agg.	Team 2	1st leg	2nd leg	Golden Set
	Bye	(Croatia) OK Dinamo Zagreb	–	–	
Olympiacos Piraeus (Greece)	6–0	(Belgium) Asterix Avo Beveren	3–0	3–0	
Sport Lisboa e Benfica (Portugal)	3–3	(Spain) CD Heidelberg Las Palmas	3–1	0–3	15–10
Janta Volej Kisela Voda (North Macedonia)	4–2	(Bosnia and Herzegovina) ŽOK Gacko RD Swisslion	3–2	3–2	

=== First leg ===
Date	Time		Score		Set 1	Set 2	Set 3	Set 4	Set 5	Total	Report
22 Oct	19:00	Olympiacos Piraeus (Greece)	3–0	(Belgium) Asterix Avo Beveren	25–14	25–19	25–19			75–52	Report
23 Oct	19:30	Sport Lisboa e Benfica (Portugal)	3–1	(Spain) CD Heidelberg Las Palmas	21–25	25–15	25–15	25–22		96–77	Report
22 Oct	20:00	Janta Volej Kisela Voda (North Macedonia)	3–2	(Bosnia and Herzegovina) ŽOK Gacko RD Swisslion	25–21	21–25	25–22	20–25	18–16	109–109	Report

=== Second leg ===
Date	Time		Score		Set 1	Set 2	Set 3	Set 4	Set 5	Total	Report
30 Oct	19:30	Asterix Avo Beveren (Belgium)	0–3	(Greece) Olympiacos Piraeus	21–25	20–25	23–25			64–75	Report
29 Oct	19:00	CD Heidelberg Las Palmas (Spain)	3–0	(Portugal) Sport Lisboa e Benfica	25–18	25–19	25–17			75–54	Report
Golden set		CD Heidelberg Las Palmas (Spain)	10–15	(Portugal) Sport Lisboa e Benfica							
29 Oct	18:00	ŽOK Gacko RD Swisslion (Bosnia and Herzegovina)	2–3	(North Macedonia) Janta Volej Kisela Voda	24–26	25–21	25–19	18–25	13–15	105–106	Report

== Third round ==
- The winners of the ties qualify for the league round (fourth round).
- In case the teams are tied after two legs, a Golden Set is played immediately at the completion of the second leg.
- All times are local.

Team 1	Agg.	Team 2	1st leg	2nd leg
OK Dinamo Zagreb (Croatia)	0–6	(Bulgaria) Maritza Plovdiv	0–3	0–3
Olympiacos Piraeus (Greece)	4–2	(Hungary) Vasas Óbuda Budapest	3–0	2–3
Sport Lisboa e Benfica (Portugal)	6–0	(Slovenia) OTP Banka Branik Maribor	3–1	3–0
Janta Volej Kisela Voda (North Macedonia)	0–6	(France) Volero Le Cannet	1–3	0–3

=== First leg ===
Date	Time		Score		Set 1	Set 2	Set 3	Set 4	Set 5	Total	Report
5 Nov	20:00	OK Dinamo Zagreb (Croatia)	0–3	(Bulgaria) Maritza Plovdiv	21–25	9–25	18–25			48–75	Report
5 Nov	19:00	Olympiacos Piraeus (Greece)	3–0	(Hungary) Vasas Óbuda Budapest	25–21	26–24	25–23			76–68	Report
6 Nov	17:30	Sport Lisboa e Benfica (Portugal)	3–1	(Slovenia) OTP Banka Branik Maribor	23–25	25–18	28–26	25–18		101–87	Report
4 Nov	18:00	Janta Volej Kisela Voda (North Macedonia)	1–3	(France) Volero Le Cannet	15–25	10–25	25–20	9–25		59–95	Report

=== Second leg ===
Date	Time		Score		Set 1	Set 2	Set 3	Set 4	Set 5	Total	Report
12 Nov	18:30	Maritza Plovdiv (Bulgaria)	3–0	(Croatia) OK Dinamo Zagreb	25–13	25–10	25–20			75–43	Report
13 Nov	18:00	Vasas Óbuda Budapest (Hungary)	3–2	(Greece) Olympiacos Piraeus	18–25	22–25	25–17	25–22	15–8	105–97	Report
12 Nov	18:00	OTP Banka Branik Maribor (Slovenia)	0–3	(Portugal) Sport Lisboa e Benfica	18–25	23–25	21–25			62–75	Report
13 Nov	20:30	Volero Le Cannet (France)	3–0	(North Macedonia) Janta Volej Kisela Voda	25–6	25–13	25–13			75–32	Report

== Final standings ==
Winners of the 3rd round	Losers of the 3rd round	Losers of the 2nd round
(Bulgaria) Maritza Plovdiv	(Hungary) Vasas Óbuda Budapest	(Spain) CD Heidelberg Las Palmas
(France) Volero Le Cannet	(Slovenia) OTP Banka Branik Maribor	(Bosnia and Herzegovina) ŽOK Gacko RD Swisslion
(Portugal) Sport Lisboa e Benfica	(North Macedonia) Janta Volej Kisela Voda	(Belgium) Asterix Avo Beveren
(Greece) Olympiacos Piraeus	(Croatia) OK Dinamo Zagreb	

Qualified for 2025–26 CEV Champions League
Qualified for 2025–26 CEV Cup
