= 2025–26 CEV Women's Challenge Cup =

European volleyball tournament

- League: CEV Women's Challenge Cup
- Sport: Volleyball
- Duration: 28 October 2025 – 18 March 2026
- Matches: 94
- Teams: 48

Finals
- Champions: (Italy) Megabox Group Vallefoglia
- Runners-up: (Greece) Panathinaikos Athens
- Finals MVP: (Albania) Erblira Bici

CEV Women's Challenge Cup seasons
- ← 2024–25 2026–27 →

The 2025–26 CEV Women's Challenge Cup was the 46th edition of the European CEV Challenge Cup volleyball club tournament organised by the European Volleyball Confederation.

== Format ==
The CEV Challenge Cup is played in a knockout format. Each team plays a home and an away match with result points awarded for each leg (3 points for 3–0 or 3–1 wins, 2 points for 3–2 win, 1 point for 2–3 loss). After two legs, the team with the most result points advances to the next round. In case the teams are tied after two legs, a Golden Set is played immediately at the completion of the second leg. The Golden Set winner is the team that first obtains 15 points, provided that the points difference between the two teams is at least 2 points (thus, the Golden Set is similar to a tiebreak set in a regular match).

Qualification round (Home and away matches):

- 32nd finals

Main phase (Home and away matches):

- 16th finals → 8th finals → Quarterfinals

Final phase (Home and away matches):

- Semifinals → Finals

== Participating teams ==
49 teams registered for the 2025–26 edition of the tournament. 34 teams were allocated slots in the qualification round and 15 teams were allocated direct slots in the 16th finals. The number of participating teams was reduced to 48, due to the withdrawal of the German team SC Potsdam.

Rank	Country	No. of teams	Teams
1	Romania	2	CSM Corona Brașov, CSM Lugoj
2	Italy	1	Megabox Group Vallefoglia
4	Germany	~~1~~	~~SC Potsdam~~ (Note: SC Potsdam withdrew from the competition before the first match was played.)
6	Serbia	2	Crvena Zvezda Beograd, GŽOK Srem Sremska Mitrovica
7	Greece	4	AEK Athens (Note: AEK Athens qualified by winning the 2025 BVA Cup.), AO Thiras, GS Panionios Nea Smyrni, Panathinaikos Athens
8	Czech Republic	3	Olymp Praha, TJ Ostrava, VK Prostějov
9	Croatia	2	OK Brda Split, OK Nebo Zaprešić
11	Switzerland	3	VBC Cheseaux, VC Kanti Schaffhausen, Volley Düdingen
12	Belgium	2	Charleroi Volley, Tchalou Chapelle-lez-Herlaimont
13	Spain	3	Emalsa Gran Canaria, Fundación Cajasol Andalucía, Ocisa Haro Rioja
14	Hungary	2	Fatum Nyíregyháza, KHG Kaposvári NRC
15	Portugal	1	Sporting Clube de Braga
16	Austria	2	Erzbergm Trofaiach Eisenerz, UVC Holding Graz
18	Slovenia	1	GEN-I Volley Nova Gorica
20	Bosnia and Herzegovina	1	ŽOK Igman Ilidža
21	Netherlands	2	Friso Sneek, Draisma Dynamo Apeldoorn
23	Slovakia	3	VA Uniza Žilina, VK Pirane Brusno, VK Slovan Bratislava
24	Finland	1	LP Salo
25	Norway	2	Øksil Myre, TIF Viking Bergen
26	Denmark	1	Holte IF
28	Montenegro	1	Budućnost Podgorica
28	Lithuania	1	Kaunas VDU
30	Bulgaria	1	Levski Sofia
32	Cyprus	1	Olympiada Neapolis Nicosia
34	North Macedonia	2	Nakovski Volley Strumica, Rabotnicki Skopje
34	Ukraine	1	SC Balta
N/A	Estonia	1	Rae Spordikool Viaston Jüri
N/A	Faroe Islands	1	Fleyr Tórshavn
N/A	Kosovo	1	KV Fer Volley Ferizaj

== Bracket ==
The drawing of lots was held on 15 July 2025 in Luxembourg City.

32nd finals
(Norway) Øksil	3	3
(Lithuania) Kaunas VDU	1	2
(North Macedonia) Rabotnicki	0	3
(Estonia) Rae Spordikool	3	2
(Slovakia) VK Pirane	3	3
(Norway) TIF Viking	1	1
(Netherlands) Friso Sneek	0	1
(Romania) CSM Lugoj	3	3
(Switzerland) VBC Cheseaux	3	2
(Bulgaria) Levski Sofia	0	3
(Austria) Erzbergm	0	2
(Ukraine) SC Balta	3	3
(Hungary) Fatum	3	1	16
(Finland) LP Salo	0	3	14
(Greece) AEK Athens	3	3
(Serbia) GŽOK Srem	0	0
(Spain) Haro Rioja	3	3
(Montenegro) Budućnost	0	0
(Switzerland) Volley Düdingen	3	3
(Kosovo) KV Fer Volley	1	1
(Slovakia) VA Uniza Žilina	1	1
(Denmark) Holte IF	3	3
(Belgium) Tchalou	3	3
(Faroe Islands) Fleyr	0	0
(Croatia) OK Brda	0	0
(Cyprus) Olympiada	3	3
(Czech Republic) TJ Ostrava	3	3
(North Macedonia) Nakovski Volley	0	0
(Spain) Fund. Cajasol	3	3
(Slovakia) VK Slovan	2	2
(Czech Republic) VK Prostějov	3	0
(Netherlands) Draisma Dynamo	2	3
(Greece) AO Thiras	3	0
(Greece) GS Panionios	2	3

16th finals
(Norway) Øksil	0	0
(Hungary) Kaposvári NRC	3	3
(Estonia) Rae Spordikool	2	1
(Czech Republic) Olymp Praha	3	3
(Slovakia) VK Pirane	0	0
(Slovenia) GEN-I Volley	3	3
(Romania) CSM Lugoj	3	3
(Germany) ~~SC Potsdam~~	0	0
(Switzerland) VBC Cheseaux	0	0
(Spain) Emalsa GC	3	3
(Ukraine) SC Balta	0	3
(Croatia) OK Nebo	3	2
(Hungary) Fatum	3	3
(Bosnia and Herzegovina) ŽOK Igman	0	0
(Greece) AEK Athens	3	1	7
(Italy) Megabox	1	3	15
(Spain) Haro Rioja	1	0
(Portugal) SC Braga	3	3
(Switzerland) Volley Düdingen	0	0
(Greece) Panathinaikos	3	3
(Denmark) Holte IF	3	3
(Austria) UVC Graz	0	2
(Belgium) Tchalou	3	0
(Serbia) Crvena Zvezda	2	3
(Cyprus) Olympiada	3	3
(Belgium) Charleroi Volley	0	0
(Czech Republic) TJ Ostrava	3	1	15
(Switzerland) VC Kanti	0	3	12
(Spain) Fund. Cajasol	3	1	15
(Netherlands) Draisma Dynamo	1	3	11
(Greece) GS Panionios	3	3
(Romania) Corona Brașov	0	1

8th finals
(Hungary) Kaposvári NRC	3	3
(Czech Republic) Olymp Praha	0	1
(Slovenia) GEN-I Volley	3	2
(Romania) CSM Lugoj	0	3
(Spain) Emalsa GC	3	3
(Croatia) OK Nebo	1	0
(Hungary) Fatum	0	0
(Italy) Megabox	3	3
(Portugal) SC Braga	0	0
(Greece) Panathinaikos	3	3
(Denmark) Holte IF	1	0
(Serbia) Crvena Zvezda	3	3
(Cyprus) Olympiada	3	3
(Czech Republic) TJ Ostrava	0	2
(Spain) Fund. Cajasol	0	0
(Greece) GS Panionios	3	3

Quarterfinals
(Hungary) Kaposvári NRC	3	3
(Slovenia) GEN-I Volley	0	1
(Spain) Emalsa GC	0	1
(Italy) Megabox	3	3
(Greece) Panathinaikos	3	3
(Serbia) Crvena Zvezda	0	1
(Cyprus) Olympiada	1	2
(Greece) GS Panionios	3	3

Semifinals
(Hungary) Kaposvári NRC	2	0
(Italy) Megabox	3	3
(Greece) Panathinaikos	3	3
(Greece) GS Panionios	1	2

Finals
(Italy) Megabox	3	3
(Greece) Panathinaikos	2	0

== Qualification round ==
=== 32nd finals ===
- The winners of the ties qualify for the 16th finals.
- In case the teams are tied after two legs, a Golden Set is played immediately at the completion of the second leg.
- All times are local.

Team 1	Agg.	Team 2	1st leg	2nd leg	Golden Set
Øksil Myre (Norway)	5–1	(Lithuania) Kaunas VDU	3–1	3–2	
Rabotnicki Skopje (North Macedonia)	2–4	(Estonia) Rae Spordikool Viaston Jüri	0–3	3–2	
VK Pirane Brusno (Slovakia)	6–0	(Norway) TIF Viking Bergen	3–1	3–1	
Friso Sneek (Netherlands)	0–6	(Romania) CSM Lugoj	0–3	1–3	
VBC Cheseaux (Switzerland)	4–2	(Bulgaria) Levski Sofia	3–0	2–3	
Erzbergm Trofaiach Eisenerz (Austria)	1–5	(Ukraine) SC Balta	0–3	2–3	
Fatum Nyíregyháza (Hungary)	3–3	(Finland) LP Salo	3–0	1–3	16–14
AEK Athens (Greece)	6–0	(Serbia) GŽOK Srem Sremska Mitrovica	3–0	3–0	
Ocisa Haro Rioja (Spain)	6–0	(Montenegro) Budućnost Podgorica	3–0	3–0	
Volley Düdingen (Switzerland)	6–0	(Kosovo) KV Fer Volley Ferizaj	3–1	3–1	
VA Uniza Žilina (Slovakia)	0–6	(Denmark) Holte IF	1–3	1–3	
Tchalou Chapelle-lez-Herlaimont (Belgium)	6–0	(Faroe Islands) Fleyr Tórshavn	3–0	3–0	
OK Brda Split (Croatia)	0–6	(Cyprus) Olympiada Neapolis Nicosia	0–3	0–3	
TJ Ostrava (Czech Republic)	6–0	(North Macedonia) Nakovski Volley Strumica	3–0	3–0	
Fundación Cajasol Andalucía (Spain)	4–2	(Slovakia) VK Slovan Bratislava	3–2	3–2	
VK Prostějov (Czech Republic)	2–4	(Netherlands) Draisma Dynamo Apeldoorn	3–2	0–3	
AO Thiras (Greece)	2–4	(Greece) GS Panionios Nea Smyrni	3–2	0–3	

==== First leg ====
Date	Time		Score		Set 1	Set 2	Set 3	Set 4	Set 5	Total	Report
5 Nov	19:00	Øksil Myre (Norway)	3–1	(Lithuania) Kaunas VDU	25–19	26–24	12–25	26–24		89–92	Report
4 Nov	19:00	Rabotnicki Skopje (North Macedonia)	0–3	(Estonia) Rae Spordikool Viaston Jüri	15–25	24–26	18–25			57–76	Report
4 Nov	19:00	VK Pirane Brusno (Slovakia)	3–1	(Norway) TIF Viking Bergen	22–25	25–11	25–19	25–20		97–75	Report
29 Oct	20:00	Friso Sneek (Netherlands)	0–3	(Romania) CSM Lugoj	22–25	20–25	21–25			63–75	Report
29 Oct	20:00	VBC Cheseaux (Switzerland)	3–0	(Bulgaria) Levski Sofia	25–23	25–14	25–23			75–60	Report
5 Nov	19:00	Erzbergm Trofaiach Eisenerz (Austria)	0–3	(Ukraine) SC Balta	19–25	21–25	19–25			59–75	Report
30 Oct	18:00	Fatum Nyíregyháza (Hungary)	3–0	(Finland) LP Salo	26–24	25–14	27–25			78–63	Report
28 Oct	19:00	AEK Athens (Greece)	3–0	(Serbia) GŽOK Srem Sremska Mitrovica	25–19	25–21	25–16			75–56	Report
30 Oct	20:00	Ocisa Haro Rioja (Spain)	3–0	(Montenegro) Budućnost Podgorica	25–14	25–12	25–12			75–38	Report
29 Oct	20:00	Volley Düdingen (Switzerland)	3–1	(Kosovo) KV Fer Volley Ferizaj	25–15	22–25	25–18	25–15		97–73	Report
29 Oct	18:30	VA Uniza Žilina (Slovakia)	1–3	(Denmark) Holte IF	25–23	22–25	24–26	23–25		94–99	Report
29 Oct	20:00	Tchalou Chapelle-lez-Herlaimont (Belgium)	3–0	(Faroe Islands) Fleyr Tórshavn	25–8	25–7	25–9			75–24	Report
29 Oct	19:30	OK Brda Split (Croatia)	0–3	(Cyprus) Olympiada Neapolis Nicosia	17–25	17–25	15–25			49–75	Report
29 Oct	18:00	TJ Ostrava (Czech Republic)	3–0	(North Macedonia) Nakovski Volley Strumica	25–13	25–9	25–10			75–32	Report
29 Oct	19:00	Fundación Cajasol Andalucía (Spain)	3–2	(Slovakia) VK Slovan Bratislava	21–25	25–22	22–25	25–13	15–13	108–98	Report
29 Oct	18:00	VK Prostějov (Czech Republic)	3–2	(Netherlands) Draisma Dynamo Apeldoorn	25–18	23–25	20–25	25–14	16–14	109–96	Report
29 Oct	20:00	AO Thiras (Greece)	3–2	(Greece) GS Panionios Nea Smyrni	23–25	25–23	25–19	13–25	15–12	101–104	Report

==== Second leg ====
Date	Time		Score		Set 1	Set 2	Set 3	Set 4	Set 5	Total	Report
30 Oct	18:30	Kaunas VDU (Lithuania)	2–3	(Norway) Øksil Myre	25–21	17–25	21–25	25–22	9–15	97–108	Report
5 Nov	19:00	Rae Spordikool Viaston Jüri (Estonia)	2–3	(North Macedonia) Rabotnicki Skopje	19–25	25–20	25–14	22–25	5–15	96–99	Report
5 Nov	19:00	TIF Viking Bergen (Norway)	1–3	(Slovakia) VK Pirane Brusno	13–25	23–25	25–21	19–25		80–96	Report
5 Nov	18:30	CSM Lugoj (Romania)	3–1	(Netherlands) Friso Sneek	23–25	25–17	25–18	25–21		98–81	Report
5 Nov	19:00	Levski Sofia (Bulgaria)	3–2	(Switzerland) VBC Cheseaux	16–25	12–25	25–16	25–19	15–11	93–96	Report
6 Nov	19:00	SC Balta (Ukraine)	3–2	(Austria) Erzbergm Trofaiach Eisenerz	22–25	25–17	22–25	25–16	15–6	109–89	Report
6 Nov	18:30	LP Salo (Finland)	3–1	(Hungary) Fatum Nyíregyháza	25–21	25–22	15–25	32–30		97–98	Report
Golden set		LP Salo (Finland)	14–16	(Hungary) Fatum Nyíregyháza							
5 Nov	19:00	GŽOK Srem Sremska Mitrovica (Serbia)	0–3	(Greece) AEK Athens	11–25	17–25	21–25			49–75	Report
5 Nov	17:00	Budućnost Podgorica (Montenegro)	0–3	(Spain) Ocisa Haro Rioja	15–25	20–25	17–25			52–75	Report
5 Nov	20:00	KV Fer Volley Ferizaj (Kosovo)	1–3	(Switzerland) Volley Düdingen	17–25	16–25	25–19	21–25		79–94	Report
4 Nov	19:00	Holte IF (Denmark)	3–1	(Slovakia) VA Uniza Žilina	22–25	25–19	25–15	25–19		97–78	Report
6 Nov	19:00	Fleyr Tórshavn (Faroe Islands)	0–3	(Belgium) Tchalou Chapelle-lez-Herlaimont	11–25	13–25	11–25			35–75	Report
5 Nov	20:00	Olympiada Neapolis Nicosia (Cyprus)	3–0	(Croatia) OK Brda Split	25–11	25–11	25–12			75–34	Report
5 Nov	19:00	Nakovski Volley Strumica (North Macedonia)	0–3	(Czech Republic) TJ Ostrava	15–25	21–25	15–25			51–75	Report
5 Nov	19:30	VK Slovan Bratislava (Slovakia)	2–3	(Spain) Fundación Cajasol Andalucía	22–25	17–25	25–23	25–22	12–15	101–110	Report
6 Nov	19:30	Draisma Dynamo Apeldoorn (Netherlands)	3–0	(Czech Republic) VK Prostějov	25–20	25–22	25–22			75–64	Report
5 Nov	17:00	GS Panionios Nea Smyrni (Greece)	3–0	(Greece) AO Thiras	25–21	25–17	25–23			75–61	Report

== Main phase ==
=== 16th finals ===
- The winners of the ties qualify for the 8th finals.
- In case the teams are tied after two legs, a Golden Set is played immediately at the completion of the second leg.
- All times are local.

Team 1	Agg.	Team 2	1st leg	2nd leg	Golden Set
Øksil Myre (Norway)	0–6	(Hungary) KHG Kaposvári NRC	0–3	0–3	
Rae Spordikool Viaston Jüri (Estonia)	1–5	(Czech Republic) Olymp Praha	2–3	1–3	
VK Pirane Brusno (Slovakia)	0–6	(Slovenia) GEN-I Volley Nova Gorica	0–3	0–3	
CSM Lugoj (Romania)	6–0	(Germany) ~~SC Potsdam~~ (Note: SC Potsdam withdrew from the competition before the first match was played.)	3–0	3–0	
VBC Cheseaux (Switzerland)	0–6	(Spain) Emalsa Gran Canaria	0–3	0–3	
SC Balta (Ukraine)	2–4	(Croatia) OK Nebo Zaprešić	0–3	3–2	
Fatum Nyíregyháza (Hungary)	6–0	(Bosnia and Herzegovina) ŽOK Igman Ilidža	3–0	3–0	
AEK Athens (Greece)	3–3	(Italy) Megabox Group Vallefoglia	3–1	1–3	7–15
Ocisa Haro Rioja (Spain)	0–6	(Portugal) Sporting Clube de Braga	1–3	0–3	
Volley Düdingen (Switzerland)	0–6	(Greece) Panathinaikos Athens	0–3	0–3	
Holte IF (Denmark)	5–1	(Austria) UVC Holding Graz	3–0	3–2	
Tchalou Chapelle-lez-Herlaimont (Belgium)	2–4	(Serbia) Crvena Zvezda Beograd	3–2	0–3	
Olympiada Neapolis Nicosia (Cyprus)	6–0	(Belgium) Charleroi Volley	3–0	3–0	
TJ Ostrava (Czech Republic)	3–3	(Switzerland) VC Kanti Schaffhausen	3–0	1–3	15–12
Fundación Cajasol Andalucía (Spain)	3–3	(Netherlands) Draisma Dynamo Apeldoorn	3–1	1–3	15–11
GS Panionios Nea Smyrni (Greece)	6–0	(Romania) CSM Corona Brașov	3–0	3–1	

==== First leg ====
Date	Time		Score		Set 1	Set 2	Set 3	Set 4	Set 5	Total	Report
25 Nov	19:00	Øksil Myre (Norway)	0–3	(Hungary) KHG Kaposvári NRC	13–25	12–25	15–25			40–75	Report
25 Nov	19:00	Rae Spordikool Viaston Jüri (Estonia)	2–3	(Czech Republic) Olymp Praha	21–25	24–26	25–23	25–18	14–16	109–108	Report
26 Nov	20:30	VK Pirane Brusno (Slovakia)	0–3	(Slovenia) GEN-I Volley Nova Gorica	18–25	18–25	17–25			53–75	Report
26 Nov	20:00	VBC Cheseaux (Switzerland)	0–3	(Spain) Emalsa Gran Canaria	18–25	19–25	15–25			52–75	Report
2 Dec	20:00	SC Balta (Ukraine)	0–3	(Croatia) OK Nebo Zaprešić	15–25	22–25	22–25			59–75	Report
26 Nov	18:00	Fatum Nyíregyháza (Hungary)	3–0	(Bosnia and Herzegovina) ŽOK Igman Ilidža	25–19	25–11	25–16			75–46	Report
25 Nov	19:00	AEK Athens (Greece)	3–1	(Italy) Megabox Group Vallefoglia	25–15	25–17	16–25	25–22		91–79	Report
26 Nov	20:00	Ocisa Haro Rioja (Spain)	1–3	(Portugal) Sporting Clube de Braga	13–25	25–23	16–25	21–25		75–98	Report
26 Nov	19:30	Volley Düdingen (Switzerland)	0–3	(Greece) Panathinaikos Athens	20–25	19–25	21–25			60–75	Report
25 Nov	19:00	Holte IF (Denmark)	3–0	(Austria) UVC Holding Graz	25–17	25–16	27–25			77–58	Report
26 Nov	20:00	Tchalou Chapelle-lez-Herlaimont (Belgium)	3–2	(Serbia) Crvena Zvezda Beograd	19–25	25–22	21–25	25–23	15–7	105–102	Report
26 Nov	20:00	Olympiada Neapolis Nicosia (Cyprus)	3–0	(Belgium) Charleroi Volley	25–14	25–22	25–21			75–57	Report
26 Nov	18:00	TJ Ostrava (Czech Republic)	3–0	(Switzerland) VC Kanti Schaffhausen	25–18	25–19	28–26			78–63	Report
26 Nov	19:00	Fundación Cajasol Andalucía (Spain)	3–1	(Netherlands) Draisma Dynamo Apeldoorn	22–25	25–23	25–16	25–21		97–85	Report
25 Nov	19:30	GS Panionios Nea Smyrni (Greece)	3–0	(Romania) CSM Corona Brașov	27–25	25–16	25–18			77–59	Report

==== Second leg ====
Date	Time		Score		Set 1	Set 2	Set 3	Set 4	Set 5	Total	Report
26 Nov	17:30	KHG Kaposvári NRC (Hungary)	3–0	(Norway) Øksil Myre	25–7	25–13	25–21			75–41	Report
3 Dec	18:00	Olymp Praha (Czech Republic)	3–1	(Estonia) Rae Spordikool Viaston Jüri	25–22	25–21	23–25	26–24		99–92	Report
3 Dec	19:00	GEN-I Volley Nova Gorica (Slovenia)	3–0	(Slovakia) VK Pirane Brusno	25–23	25–18	25–22			75–63	Report
4 Dec	18:30	Emalsa Gran Canaria (Spain)	3–0	(Switzerland) VBC Cheseaux	30–28	25–23	25–17			80–68	Report
3 Dec	20:00	OK Nebo Zaprešić (Croatia)	2–3	(Ukraine) SC Balta	25–21	25–20	22–25	15–25	9–15	96–106	Report
2 Dec	19:00	ŽOK Igman Ilidža (Bosnia and Herzegovina)	0–3	(Hungary) Fatum Nyíregyháza	18–25	18–25	17–25			53–75	Report
3 Dec	20:00	Megabox Group Vallefoglia (Italy)	3–1	(Greece) AEK Athens	25–20	21–25	25–21	25–13		96–79	Report
Golden set		Megabox Group Vallefoglia (Italy)	15–7	(Greece) AEK Athens							
3 Dec	21:00	Sporting Clube de Braga (Portugal)	3–0	(Spain) Ocisa Haro Rioja	25–17	25–13	25–19			75–49	Report
3 Dec	18:00	Panathinaikos Athens (Greece)	3–0	(Switzerland) Volley Düdingen	25–16	25–13	25–14			75–43	Report
3 Dec	19:00	UVC Holding Graz (Austria)	2–3	(Denmark) Holte IF	18–25	26–24	25–19	15–25	12–15	96–108	Report
4 Dec	19:00	Crvena Zvezda Beograd (Serbia)	3–0	(Belgium) Tchalou Chapelle-lez-Herlaimont	25–18	25–23	25–16			75–57	Report
3 Dec	20:00	Charleroi Volley (Belgium)	0–3	(Cyprus) Olympiada Neapolis Nicosia	22–25	21–25	18–25			61–75	Report
3 Dec	20:00	VC Kanti Schaffhausen (Switzerland)	3–1	(Czech Republic) TJ Ostrava	25–16	25–18	23–25	25–15		98–74	Report
Golden set		VC Kanti Schaffhausen (Switzerland)	12–15	(Czech Republic) TJ Ostrava							
4 Dec	19:30	Draisma Dynamo Apeldoorn (Netherlands)	3–1	(Spain) Fundación Cajasol Andalucía	25–20	15–25	25–18	25–19		90–82	Report
Golden set		Draisma Dynamo Apeldoorn (Netherlands)	11–15	(Spain) Fundación Cajasol Andalucía							
2 Dec	18:00	CSM Corona Brașov (Romania)	1–3	(Greece) GS Panionios Nea Smyrni	11–25	22–25	25–21	20–25		78–96	Report

=== 8th finals ===
- The winners of the ties qualify for the quarterfinals.
- In case the teams are tied after two legs, a Golden Set is played immediately at the completion of the second leg.
- All times are local.

Team 1	Agg.	Team 2	1st leg	2nd leg
KHG Kaposvári NRC (Hungary)	6–0	(Czech Republic) Olymp Praha	3–0	3–1
GEN-I Volley Nova Gorica (Slovenia)	4–2	(Romania) CSM Lugoj	3–0	2–3
Emalsa Gran Canaria (Spain)	6–0	(Croatia) OK Nebo Zaprešić	3–1	3–0
Fatum Nyíregyháza (Hungary)	0–6	(Italy) Megabox Group Vallefoglia	0–3	0–3
Sporting Clube de Braga (Portugal)	0–6	(Greece) Panathinaikos Athens	0–3	0–3
Holte IF (Denmark)	0–6	(Serbia) Crvena Zvezda Beograd	1–3	0–3
Olympiada Neapolis Nicosia (Cyprus)	5–1	(Czech Republic) TJ Ostrava	3–0	3–2
Fundación Cajasol Andalucía (Spain)	0–6	(Greece) GS Panionios Nea Smyrni	0–3	0–3

==== First leg ====
Date	Time		Score		Set 1	Set 2	Set 3	Set 4	Set 5	Total	Report
7 Jan	18:00	KHG Kaposvári NRC (Hungary)	3–0	(Czech Republic) Olymp Praha	25–14	26–24	25–12			76–50	Report
7 Jan	19:00	GEN-I Volley Nova Gorica (Slovenia)	3–0	(Romania) CSM Lugoj	25–17	25–16	25–20			75–53	Report
8 Jan	18:00	Emalsa Gran Canaria (Spain)	3–1	(Croatia) OK Nebo Zaprešić	25–23	17–25	25–21	26–24		93–93	Report
8 Jan	18:00	Fatum Nyíregyháza (Hungary)	0–3	(Italy) Megabox Group Vallefoglia	19–25	22–25	15–25			56–75	Report
6 Jan	20:30	Sporting Clube de Braga (Portugal)	0–3	(Greece) Panathinaikos Athens	23–25	32–34	17–25			72–84	Report
8 Jan	19:00	Holte IF (Denmark)	1–3	(Serbia) Crvena Zvezda Beograd	17–25	26–24	15–25	23–25		81–99	Report
8 Jan	20:00	Olympiada Neapolis Nicosia (Cyprus)	3–0	(Czech Republic) TJ Ostrava	25–23	25–12	25–22			75–57	Report
8 Jan	19:00	Fundación Cajasol Andalucía (Spain)	0–3	(Greece) GS Panionios Nea Smyrni	18–25	23–25	12–25			53–75	Report

==== Second leg ====
Date	Time		Score		Set 1	Set 2	Set 3	Set 4	Set 5	Total	Report
13 Jan	17:00	Olymp Praha (Czech Republic)	1–3	(Hungary) KHG Kaposvári NRC	25–22	10–25	20–25	21–25		76–97	Report
14 Jan	18:30	CSM Lugoj (Romania)	3–2	(Slovenia) GEN-I Volley Nova Gorica	25–20	25–27	25–23	21–25	15–10	111–105	Report
14 Jan	20:00	OK Nebo Zaprešić (Croatia)	0–3	(Spain) Emalsa Gran Canaria	23–25	22–25	22–25			67–75	Report
14 Jan	20:00	Megabox Group Vallefoglia (Italy)	3–0	(Hungary) Fatum Nyíregyháza	25–17	25–13	25–19			75–49	Report
15 Jan	17:30	Panathinaikos Athens (Greece)	3–0	(Portugal) Sporting Clube de Braga	25–18	25–23	25–18			75–59	Report
15 Jan	17:00	Crvena Zvezda Beograd (Serbia)	3–0	(Denmark) Holte IF	25–11	25–20	25–19			75–50	Report
14 Jan	18:00	TJ Ostrava (Czech Republic)	2–3	(Cyprus) Olympiada Neapolis Nicosia	20–25	25–20	20–25	25–20	8–15	98–105	Report
15 Jan	18:00	GS Panionios Nea Smyrni (Greece)	3–0	(Spain) Fundación Cajasol Andalucía	26–24	25–17	25–16			76–57	Report

=== Quarterfinals ===
- The winners of the ties qualify for the semifinals.
- In case the teams are tied after two legs, a Golden Set is played immediately at the completion of the second leg.
- All times are local.

Team 1	Agg.	Team 2	1st leg	2nd leg
KHG Kaposvári NRC (Hungary)	6–0	(Slovenia) GEN-I Volley Nova Gorica	3–0	3–1
Emalsa Gran Canaria (Spain)	0–6	(Italy) Megabox Group Vallefoglia	0–3	1–3
Panathinaikos Athens (Greece)	6–0	(Serbia) Crvena Zvezda Beograd	3–0	3–1
Olympiada Neapolis Nicosia (Cyprus)	1–5	(Greece) GS Panionios Nea Smyrni	1–3	2–3

==== First leg ====
Date	Time		Score		Set 1	Set 2	Set 3	Set 4	Set 5	Total	Report
28 Jan	18:00	KHG Kaposvári NRC (Hungary)	3–0	(Slovenia) GEN-I Volley Nova Gorica	26–24	25–23	25–21			76–68	Report
28 Jan	19:00	Emalsa Gran Canaria (Spain)	0–3	(Italy) Megabox Group Vallefoglia	21–25	20–25	17–25			58–75	Report
29 Jan	17:30	Panathinaikos Athens (Greece)	3–0	(Serbia) Crvena Zvezda Beograd	25–19	25–16	25–21			75–56	Report
29 Jan	19:00	Olympiada Neapolis Nicosia (Cyprus)	1–3	(Greece) GS Panionios Nea Smyrni	25–21	17–25	19–25	14–25		75–96	Report

==== Second leg ====
Date	Time		Score		Set 1	Set 2	Set 3	Set 4	Set 5	Total	Report
4 Feb	19:00	GEN-I Volley Nova Gorica (Slovenia)	1–3	(Hungary) KHG Kaposvári NRC	20–25	13–25	25–16	14–25		72–91	Report
4 Feb	20:00	Megabox Group Vallefoglia (Italy)	3–1	(Spain) Emalsa Gran Canaria	25–20	25–17	14–25	30–28		94–90	Report
4 Feb	18:00	Crvena Zvezda Beograd (Serbia)	1–3	(Greece) Panathinaikos Athens	21–25	17–25	25–23	21–25		84–98	Report
5 Feb	19:00	GS Panionios Nea Smyrni (Greece)	3–2	(Cyprus) Olympiada Neapolis Nicosia	25–18	23–25	25–23	21–25	15–8	109–99	Report

== Final phase ==
=== Semifinals ===
- The winners of the ties qualify for the finals.
- In case the teams are tied after two legs, a Golden Set is played immediately at the completion of the second leg.
- All times are local.

Team 1	Agg.	Team 2	1st leg	2nd leg
KHG Kaposvári NRC (Hungary)	1–5	(Italy) Megabox Group Vallefoglia	2–3	0–3
Panathinaikos Athens (Greece)	5–1	(Greece) GS Panionios Nea Smyrni	3–1	3–2

==== First leg ====
Date	Time		Score		Set 1	Set 2	Set 3	Set 4	Set 5	Total	Report
18 Feb	18:00	KHG Kaposvári NRC (Hungary)	2–3	(Italy) Megabox Group Vallefoglia	22–25	20–25	25–23	25–18	11–15	103–106	Report
19 Feb	17:30	Panathinaikos Athens (Greece)	3–1	(Greece) GS Panionios Nea Smyrni	25–18	27–29	25–22	25–18		102–87	Report

==== Second leg ====
Date	Time		Score		Set 1	Set 2	Set 3	Set 4	Set 5	Total	Report
25 Feb	20:00	Megabox Group Vallefoglia (Italy)	3–0	(Hungary) KHG Kaposvári NRC	25–19	25–16	25–21			75–56	Report
25 Feb	19:00	GS Panionios Nea Smyrni (Greece)	2–3	(Greece) Panathinaikos Athens	17–25	18–25	25–14	25–19	8–15	93–98	Report

=== Finals ===
- In case the teams are tied after two legs, a Golden Set is played immediately at the completion of the second leg.
- All times are local.

Team 1	Agg.	Team 2	1st leg	2nd leg
Megabox Group Vallefoglia (Italy)	5–1	(Greece) Panathinaikos Athens	3–2	3–0

==== First leg ====
Date	Time		Score		Set 1	Set 2	Set 3	Set 4	Set 5	Total	Report
11 Mar	20:00	Megabox Group Vallefoglia (Italy)	3–2	(Greece) Panathinaikos Athens	25–20	20–25	25–12	22–25	15–12	107–94	Report

==== Second leg ====
Date	Time		Score		Set 1	Set 2	Set 3	Set 4	Set 5	Total	Report
18 Mar	19:00	Panathinaikos Athens (Greece)	0–3	(Italy) Megabox Group Vallefoglia	20–25	25–27	16–25			61–77	Report

== Final standings ==
Rank	Team
1st place, gold medalist(s)	(Italy) Megabox Group Vallefoglia
2nd place, silver medalist(s)	(Greece) Panathinaikos Athens
Semifinalists	(Hungary) KHG Kaposvári NRC (Greece) GS Panionios Nea Smyrni

2025–26 CEV Challenge Cup winners
(Italy)
Megabox Group Vallefoglia
1st title

== See also ==
- 2025–26 CEV Champions League
- 2025–26 CEV Cup
- 2025–26 CEV Challenge Cup
- 2025–26 CEV Women's Champions League
- 2025–26 Women's CEV Cup
