= 2025–26 Women's CEV Cup =

European volleyball tournament

- League: Women's CEV Cup
- Sport: Volleyball
- Duration: 25 November 2025 – 8 April 2026
- Matches: 68
- Teams: 35

Finals
- Champions: (Turkey) Galatasaray Daikin Istanbul
- Runners-up: (Italy) Reale Mutua Fenera Chieri '76
- Finals MVP: (Turkey) İlkin Aydın

Women's CEV Cup seasons
- ← 2024–25 2026–27 →

The 2025–26 Women's CEV Cup was the 54th edition of the European CEV Cup volleyball club tournament organised by the European Volleyball Confederation.

== Format ==
The CEV Cup is played in a knockout format. Each team plays a home and an away match with result points awarded for each leg (3 points for 3–0 or 3–1 wins, 2 points for 3–2 win, 1 point for 2–3 loss). After two legs, the team with the most result points advances to the next round. In case the teams are tied after two legs, a Golden Set is played immediately at the completion of the second leg. The Golden Set winner is the team that first obtains 15 points, provided that the points difference between the two teams is at least 2 points (thus, the Golden Set is similar to a tiebreak set in a regular match).

Main phase (Home and away matches):

- 16th finals → 8th finals → Playoffs → Quarterfinals

Final phase (Home and away matches):

- Semifinals → Finals

== Participating teams ==
35 teams participated in the 2025–26 edition of the tournament. 24 teams were allocated direct slots in the 16th finals and 7 teams joined via the 2025–26 CEV Champions League qualification. In the quarterfinals the 2nd to 5th ranked third placed teams from the league round of the 2025–26 CEV Champions League joined the competition (4 teams).

Rank	Country	No. of teams	Teams
1	Romania	3	C.S.O. Voluntari 2005, CS Volei Alba Blaj (Note: Relegated from the league round of the 2025–26 CEV Champions League.), Dinamo București
2	Italy	1	Reale Mutua Fenera Chieri '76 (Note: Chieri '76 replaced Igor Gorgonzola Novara, which received a wild card to the 2025–26 CEV Champions League.)
3	France	3	Levallois Paris Saint Cloud, Vandœuvre Nancy VB, Volley Mulhouse Alsace
4	Germany	3	Allianz MTV Stuttgart, Dresdner SC, VfB Suhl Thüringen
5	Turkey	2	Galatasaray Daikin Istanbul, THY Istanbul
6	Serbia	2	Tent Obrenovac, ŽOK Ub
7	Greece	1	AC PAOK Thessaloniki
8	Czech Republic	2	Dukla Liberec, VK UP Olomouc
9	Croatia	3	Mladost Zagreb, OK Dinamo Zagreb (Note: Relegated from the qualification rounds of the 2025–26 CEV Champions League.), ŽOK Ribola Kaštela
10	Poland	3	BKS Bostik Bielsko-Biała, MOYA Radomka Radom, PGE Budowlani Łódź
11	Switzerland	1	Viteos Neuchatel UC
12	Belgium	2	Asterix Avo Beveren, Darta Bevo Roeselare
13	Spain	2	Avarca de Menorca, CD Heidelberg Las Palmas
14	Hungary	2	MBH Békéscsaba, Vasas Óbuda Budapest
15	Portugal	2	FC Porto, Sporting CP Lisboa
18	Slovenia	1	OTP Banka Branik Maribor
20	Bosnia and Herzegovina	1	ŽOK Gacko RD Swisslion
34	North Macedonia	1	Janta Volej Kisela Voda

== Bracket ==
The drawing of lots was held on 15 July 2025 in Luxembourg City.

16th finals
(Bosnia and Herzegovina) ŽOK Gacko	0	0
(Switzerland) Neuchatel UC	3	3
(Belgium) Asterix Avo	3	3
(Serbia) Tent Obrenovac	0	1
(Croatia) ŽOK Ribola Kaštela	0	0
(Hungary) MBH Békéscsaba	3	3
(Serbia) ŽOK Ub	1	0
(France) Mulhouse Alsace	3	3
(Croatia) OK Dinamo Zagreb	0	1
(Poland) BKS Bielsko-Biała	3	3
(Slovenia) OTP Banka Branik	3	3
(Greece) AC PAOK	0	0
(France) Vandœuvre Nancy	3	2
(Portugal) Sporting CP Lisboa	1	3
(Hungary) Vasas Óbuda	0	2
(Italy) Chieri '76	3	3
(Czech Republic) Dukla Liberec	3	0
(Belgium) Bevo Roeselare	2	3
(Portugal) FC Porto	1	0
(Turkey) Galatasaray	3	3
(Turkey) THY Istanbul	3	2
(Spain) Avarca de Menorca	1	3
(N/A) Bye	–	–
(Germany) MTV Stuttgart	–	–
(North Macedonia) Janta Volej	0	0
(Croatia) Mladost Zagreb	3	3
(Poland) Radomka Radom	3	3
(Czech Republic) VK UP Olomouc	0	0
(Germany) VfB Suhl	3	2
(Romania) Dinamo București	1	3
(Spain) CD Heidelberg	1	1
(Romania) C.S.O. Voluntari	3	3

8th finals
(Switzerland) Neuchatel UC	3	0	15
(Belgium) Asterix Avo	1	3	12
(Hungary) MBH Békéscsaba	1	2
(France) Mulhouse Alsace	3	3
(Poland) BKS Bielsko-Biała	3	3
(Slovenia) OTP Banka Branik	0	2
(France) Vandœuvre Nancy	2	1
(Italy) Chieri '76	3	3
(Belgium) Bevo Roeselare	0	1
(Turkey) Galatasaray	3	3
(Turkey) THY Istanbul	3	0
(Germany) MTV Stuttgart	2	3
(Croatia) Mladost Zagreb	3	0	20
(Poland) Radomka Radom	1	3	22
(Germany) VfB Suhl	3	0	10
(Romania) C.S.O. Voluntari	1	3	15

Playoffs
(Switzerland) Neuchatel UC	3	0	15
(France) Mulhouse Alsace	0	3	17
(Poland) BKS Bielsko-Biała	0	0
(Italy) Chieri '76	3	3
(Turkey) Galatasaray	3	3
(Germany) MTV Stuttgart	1	2
(Poland) Radomka Radom	2	1
(Romania) C.S.O. Voluntari	3	3

Quarterfinals
(Germany) Dresdner SC	3	3
(France) Mulhouse Alsace	0	0
(Poland) Budowlani Łódź	1	0
(Italy) Chieri '76	3	3
(France) Levallois Paris SC	2	1
(Turkey) Galatasaray	3	3
(Romania) Volei Alba Blaj	1	1
(Romania) C.S.O. Voluntari	3	3

Semifinals
(Germany) Dresdner SC	2	2
(Italy) Chieri '76	3	3
(Turkey) Galatasaray	3	3
(Romania) C.S.O. Voluntari	0	0

Finals
(Italy) Chieri '76	2	1
(Turkey) Galatasaray	3	3

== Main phase ==
=== 16th finals ===
- The winners of the ties qualify for the 8th finals.
- In case the teams are tied after two legs, a Golden Set is played immediately at the completion of the second leg.
- All times are local.

Team 1	Agg.	Team 2	1st leg	2nd leg
ŽOK Gacko RD Swisslion (Bosnia and Herzegovina)	0–6	(Switzerland) Viteos Neuchatel UC	0–3	0–3
Asterix Avo Beveren (Belgium)	6–0	(Serbia) Tent Obrenovac	3–0	3–1
ŽOK Ribola Kaštela (Croatia)	0–6	(Hungary) MBH Békéscsaba	0–3	0–3
ŽOK Ub (Serbia)	0–6	(France) Volley Mulhouse Alsace	1–3	0–3
OK Dinamo Zagreb (Croatia)	0–6	(Poland) BKS Bostik Bielsko-Biała	0–3	1–3
OTP Banka Branik Maribor (Slovenia)	6–0	(Greece) AC PAOK Thessaloniki	3–0	3–0
Vandœuvre Nancy VB (France)	4–2	(Portugal) Sporting CP Lisboa	3–1	2–3
Vasas Óbuda Budapest (Hungary)	1–5	(Italy) Reale Mutua Fenera Chieri '76	0–3	2–3
Dukla Liberec (Czech Republic)	2–4	(Belgium) Darta Bevo Roeselare	3–2	0–3
FC Porto (Portugal)	0–6	(Turkey) Galatasaray Daikin Istanbul	1–3	0–3
THY Istanbul (Turkey)	4–2	(Spain) Avarca de Menorca	3–1	2–3
	Bye	(Germany) Allianz MTV Stuttgart	–	–
Janta Volej Kisela Voda (North Macedonia)	0–6	(Croatia) Mladost Zagreb	0–3	0–3
MOYA Radomka Radom (Poland)	6–0	(Czech Republic) VK UP Olomouc	3–0	3–0
VfB Suhl Thüringen (Germany)	4–2	(Romania) Dinamo București	3–1	2–3
CD Heidelberg Las Palmas (Spain)	0–6	(Romania) C.S.O. Voluntari 2005	1–3	1–3

==== First leg ====
Date	Time		Score		Set 1	Set 2	Set 3	Set 4	Set 5	Total	Report
26 Nov	18:00	ŽOK Gacko RD Swisslion (Bosnia and Herzegovina)	0–3	(Switzerland) Viteos Neuchatel UC	13–25	15–25	19–25			47–75	Report
26 Nov	19:30	Asterix Avo Beveren (Belgium)	3–0	(Serbia) Tent Obrenovac	25–21	25–20	25–17			75–58	Report
26 Nov	18:00	ŽOK Ribola Kaštela (Croatia)	0–3	(Hungary) MBH Békéscsaba	22–25	20–25	22–25			64–75	Report
26 Nov	19:00	ŽOK Ub (Serbia)	1–3	(France) Volley Mulhouse Alsace	20–25	19–25	26–24	20–25		85–99	Report
26 Nov	19:00	OK Dinamo Zagreb (Croatia)	0–3	(Poland) BKS Bostik Bielsko-Biała	6–25	8–25	21–25			35–75	Report
26 Nov	18:00	OTP Banka Branik Maribor (Slovenia)	3–0	(Greece) AC PAOK Thessaloniki	25–16	25–20	25–23			75–59	Report
26 Nov	19:30	Vandœuvre Nancy VB (France)	3–1	(Portugal) Sporting CP Lisboa	25–18	20–25	25–21	25–23		95–87	Report
27 Nov	18:30	Vasas Óbuda Budapest (Hungary)	0–3	(Italy) Reale Mutua Fenera Chieri '76	18–25	20–25	19–25			57–75	Report
26 Nov	18:00	Dukla Liberec (Czech Republic)	3–2	(Belgium) Darta Bevo Roeselare	20–25	25–15	11–25	25–20	21–19	102–104	Report
26 Nov	20:00	FC Porto (Portugal)	1–3	(Turkey) Galatasaray Daikin Istanbul	25–22	19–25	21–25	23–25		88–97	Report
27 Nov	18:00	THY Istanbul (Turkey)	3–1	(Spain) Avarca de Menorca	25–27	25–12	26–24	25–16		101–79	Report
26 Nov	20:00	Janta Volej Kisela Voda (North Macedonia)	0–3	(Croatia) Mladost Zagreb	6–25	12–25	19–25			37–75	Report
25 Nov	20:30	MOYA Radomka Radom (Poland)	3–0	(Czech Republic) VK UP Olomouc	25–19	25–19	25–22			75–60	Report
25 Nov	19:00	VfB Suhl Thüringen (Germany)	3–1	(Romania) Dinamo București	25–22	25–22	19–25	25–21		94–90	Report
25 Nov	19:00	CD Heidelberg Las Palmas (Spain)	1–3	(Romania) C.S.O. Voluntari 2005	21–25	25–23	21–25	25–27		92–100	Report

==== Second leg ====
Date	Time		Score		Set 1	Set 2	Set 3	Set 4	Set 5	Total	Report
3 Dec	20:00	Viteos Neuchatel UC (Switzerland)	3–0	(Bosnia and Herzegovina) ŽOK Gacko RD Swisslion	25–16	25–15	25–15			75–46	Report
3 Dec	19:00	Tent Obrenovac (Serbia)	1–3	(Belgium) Asterix Avo Beveren	25–19	20–25	21–25	20–25		86–94	Report
3 Dec	18:00	MBH Békéscsaba (Hungary)	3–0	(Croatia) ŽOK Ribola Kaštela	25–19	25–16	25–11			75–46	Report
2 Dec	19:00	Volley Mulhouse Alsace (France)	3–0	(Serbia) ŽOK Ub	25–10	25–13	25–19			75–42	Report
4 Dec	20:30	BKS Bostik Bielsko-Biała (Poland)	3–1	(Croatia) OK Dinamo Zagreb	25–21	22–25	25–16	25–18		97–80	Report
3 Dec	19:00	AC PAOK Thessaloniki (Greece)	0–3	(Slovenia) OTP Banka Branik Maribor	23–25	27–29	23–25			73–79	Report
3 Dec	19:30	Sporting CP Lisboa (Portugal)	3–2	(France) Vandœuvre Nancy VB	28–26	25–19	21–25	10–25	15–12	99–107	Report
3 Dec	20:00	Reale Mutua Fenera Chieri '76 (Italy)	3–2	(Hungary) Vasas Óbuda Budapest	25–16	26–28	25–22	20–25	15–12	111–103	Report
3 Dec	20:00	Darta Bevo Roeselare (Belgium)	3–0	(Czech Republic) Dukla Liberec	25–18	25–19	25–22			75–59	Report
3 Dec	19:30	Galatasaray Daikin Istanbul (Turkey)	3–0	(Portugal) FC Porto	25–17	25–17	25–17			75–51	Report
3 Dec	20:00	Avarca de Menorca (Spain)	3–2	(Turkey) THY Istanbul	25–20	25–20	18–25	18–25	15–11	101–101	Report
3 Dec	20:00	Mladost Zagreb (Croatia)	3–0	(North Macedonia) Janta Volej Kisela Voda	25–11	25–16	25–22			75–49	Report
3 Dec	18:00	VK UP Olomouc (Czech Republic)	0–3	(Poland) MOYA Radomka Radom	15–25	13–25	20–25			48–75	Report
2 Dec	17:00	Dinamo București (Romania)	3–2	(Germany) VfB Suhl Thüringen	25–22	24–26	25–18	23–25	15–13	112–104	Report
2 Dec	19:00	C.S.O. Voluntari 2005 (Romania)	3–1	(Spain) CD Heidelberg Las Palmas	26–24	25–21	22–25	25–21		98–91	Report

=== 8th finals ===
- The winners of the ties qualify for the playoffs.
- In case the teams are tied after two legs, a Golden Set is played immediately at the completion of the second leg.
- All times are local.

Team 1	Agg.	Team 2	1st leg	2nd leg	Golden Set
Viteos Neuchatel UC (Switzerland)	3–3	(Belgium) Asterix Avo Beveren	3–1	0–3	15–12
MBH Békéscsaba (Hungary)	1–5	(France) Volley Mulhouse Alsace	1–3	2–3	
BKS Bostik Bielsko-Biała (Poland)	5–1	(Slovenia) OTP Banka Branik Maribor	3–0	3–2	
Vandœuvre Nancy VB (France)	1–5	(Italy) Reale Mutua Fenera Chieri '76	2–3	1–3	
Darta Bevo Roeselare (Belgium)	0–6	(Turkey) Galatasaray Daikin Istanbul	0–3	1–3	
THY Istanbul (Turkey)	2–4	(Germany) Allianz MTV Stuttgart	3–2	0–3	
Mladost Zagreb (Croatia)	3–3	(Poland) MOYA Radomka Radom	3–1	0–3	20–22
VfB Suhl Thüringen (Germany)	3–3	(Romania) C.S.O. Voluntari 2005	3–1	0–3	10–15

==== First leg ====
Date	Time		Score		Set 1	Set 2	Set 3	Set 4	Set 5	Total	Report
7 Jan	20:00	Viteos Neuchatel UC (Switzerland)	3–1	(Belgium) Asterix Avo Beveren	25–20	22–25	25–23	25–19		97–87	Report
8 Jan	18:00	MBH Békéscsaba (Hungary)	1–3	(France) Volley Mulhouse Alsace	28–26	15–25	11–25	15–25		69–101	Report
7 Jan	20:30	BKS Bostik Bielsko-Biała (Poland)	3–0	(Slovenia) OTP Banka Branik Maribor	25–21	25–17	25–21			75–59	Report
7 Jan	20:00	Vandœuvre Nancy VB (France)	2–3	(Italy) Reale Mutua Fenera Chieri '76	16–25	25–18	28–26	11–25	11–15	91–109	Report
7 Jan	20:00	Darta Bevo Roeselare (Belgium)	0–3	(Turkey) Galatasaray Daikin Istanbul	15–25	22–25	14–25			51–75	Report
6 Jan	17:00	THY Istanbul (Turkey)	3–2	(Germany) Allianz MTV Stuttgart	25–20	25–21	25–27	19–25	15–9	109–102	Report
8 Jan	20:00	Mladost Zagreb (Croatia)	3–1	(Poland) MOYA Radomka Radom	25–14	18–25	25–19	25–13		93–71	Report
7 Jan	19:00	VfB Suhl Thüringen (Germany)	3–1	(Romania) C.S.O. Voluntari 2005	23–25	25–18	25–18	25–20		98–81	Report

==== Second leg ====
Date	Time		Score		Set 1	Set 2	Set 3	Set 4	Set 5	Total	Report
14 Jan	19:30	Asterix Avo Beveren (Belgium)	3–0	(Switzerland) Viteos Neuchatel UC	25–20	25–18	25–22			75–60	Report
Golden set		Asterix Avo Beveren (Belgium)	12–15	(Switzerland) Viteos Neuchatel UC							
14 Jan	19:00	Volley Mulhouse Alsace (France)	3–2	(Hungary) MBH Békéscsaba	25–13	20–25	21–25	25–15	16–14	107–92	Report
14 Jan	18:00	OTP Banka Branik Maribor (Slovenia)	2–3	(Poland) BKS Bostik Bielsko-Biała	25–20	25–18	17–25	13–25	14–16	94–104	Report
14 Jan	20:00	Reale Mutua Fenera Chieri '76 (Italy)	3–1	(France) Vandœuvre Nancy VB	22–25	25–17	25–22	25–18		97–82	Report
14 Jan	19:30	Galatasaray Daikin Istanbul (Turkey)	3–1	(Belgium) Darta Bevo Roeselare	25–16	24–26	25–21	25–17		99–80	Report
14 Jan	19:30	Allianz MTV Stuttgart (Germany)	3–0	(Turkey) THY Istanbul	25–20	25–21	25–21			75–62	Report
13 Jan	20:30	MOYA Radomka Radom (Poland)	3–0	(Croatia) Mladost Zagreb	26–24	31–29	25–21			82–74	Report
Golden set		MOYA Radomka Radom (Poland)	22–20	(Croatia) Mladost Zagreb							
15 Jan	19:00	C.S.O. Voluntari 2005 (Romania)	3–0	(Germany) VfB Suhl Thüringen	25–23	30–28	25–23			80–74	Report
Golden set		C.S.O. Voluntari 2005 (Romania)	15–10	(Germany) VfB Suhl Thüringen							

=== Playoffs ===
- The winners of the ties qualify for the quarterfinals.
- In case the teams are tied after two legs, a Golden Set is played immediately at the completion of the second leg.
- All times are local.

Team 1	Agg.	Team 2	1st leg	2nd leg	Golden Set
Viteos Neuchatel UC (Switzerland)	3–3	(France) Volley Mulhouse Alsace	3–0	0–3	15–17
BKS Bostik Bielsko-Biała (Poland)	0–6	(Italy) Reale Mutua Fenera Chieri '76	0–3	0–3	
Galatasaray Daikin Istanbul (Turkey)	5–1	(Germany) Allianz MTV Stuttgart	3–1	3–2	
MOYA Radomka Radom (Poland)	1–5	(Romania) C.S.O. Voluntari 2005	2–3	1–3	

==== First leg ====
Date	Time		Score		Set 1	Set 2	Set 3	Set 4	Set 5	Total	Report
28 Jan	20:00	Viteos Neuchatel UC (Switzerland)	3–0	(France) Volley Mulhouse Alsace	26–24	26–24	25–12			77–60	Report
28 Jan	18:00	BKS Bostik Bielsko-Biała (Poland)	0–3	(Italy) Reale Mutua Fenera Chieri '76	13–25	21–25	22–25			56–75	Report
27 Jan	19:30	Galatasaray Daikin Istanbul (Turkey)	3–1	(Germany) Allianz MTV Stuttgart	25–12	21–25	25–16	25–10		96–63	Report
27 Jan	18:30	MOYA Radomka Radom (Poland)	2–3	(Romania) C.S.O. Voluntari 2005	25–23	19–25	16–25	25–17	10–15	95–105	Report

==== Second leg ====
Date	Time		Score		Set 1	Set 2	Set 3	Set 4	Set 5	Total	Report
4 Feb	19:00	Volley Mulhouse Alsace (France)	3–0	(Switzerland) Viteos Neuchatel UC	25–20	25–15	25–15			75–50	Report
Golden set		Volley Mulhouse Alsace (France)	17–15	(Switzerland) Viteos Neuchatel UC							
4 Feb	20:00	Reale Mutua Fenera Chieri '76 (Italy)	3–0	(Poland) BKS Bostik Bielsko-Biała	25–13	25–20	25–21			75–54	Report
4 Feb	19:30	Allianz MTV Stuttgart (Germany)	2–3	(Turkey) Galatasaray Daikin Istanbul	25–23	25–23	21–25	23–25	11–15	105–111	Report
4 Feb	19:00	C.S.O. Voluntari 2005 (Romania)	3–1	(Poland) MOYA Radomka Radom	25–23	25–19	27–29	25–18		102–89	Report

=== Quarterfinals ===
- The four winners of the playoffs face the 2nd to 5th ranked third placed teams from the league round of the 2025–26 CEV Champions League.
- The winners of the ties qualify for the semifinals.
- In case the teams are tied after two legs, a Golden Set is played immediately at the completion of the second leg.
- All times are local.

Team 1	Agg.	Team 2	1st leg	2nd leg
Dresdner SC (Germany)	6–0	(France) Volley Mulhouse Alsace	3–0	3–0
PGE Budowlani Łódź (Poland)	0–6	(Italy) Reale Mutua Fenera Chieri '76	1–3	0–3
Levallois Paris Saint Cloud (France)	1–5	(Turkey) Galatasaray Daikin Istanbul	2–3	1–3
CS Volei Alba Blaj (Romania)	0–6	(Romania) C.S.O. Voluntari 2005	1–3	1–3

==== First leg ====
Date	Time		Score		Set 1	Set 2	Set 3	Set 4	Set 5	Total	Report
19 Feb	19:00	Dresdner SC (Germany)	3–0	(France) Volley Mulhouse Alsace	25–19	25–22	25–17			75–58	Report
19 Feb	17:30	PGE Budowlani Łódź (Poland)	1–3	(Italy) Reale Mutua Fenera Chieri '76	25–27	25–16	21–25	24–26		95–94	Report
17 Feb	20:00	Levallois Paris Saint Cloud (France)	2–3	(Turkey) Galatasaray Daikin Istanbul	26–24	19–25	25–13	18–25	9–15	97–102	Report
19 Feb	18:00	CS Volei Alba Blaj (Romania)	1–3	(Romania) C.S.O. Voluntari 2005	20–25	24–26	25–19	23–25		92–95	Report

==== Second leg ====
Date	Time		Score		Set 1	Set 2	Set 3	Set 4	Set 5	Total	Report
25 Feb	19:00	Volley Mulhouse Alsace (France)	0–3	(Germany) Dresdner SC	22–25	22–25	19–25			63–75	Report
25 Feb	20:00	Reale Mutua Fenera Chieri '76 (Italy)	3–0	(Poland) PGE Budowlani Łódź	25–18	25–19	25–21			75–58	Report
25 Feb	20:00	Galatasaray Daikin Istanbul (Turkey)	3–1	(France) Levallois Paris Saint Cloud	22–25	25–21	25–22	25–17		97–85	Report
25 Feb	19:00	C.S.O. Voluntari 2005 (Romania)	3–1	(Romania) CS Volei Alba Blaj	25–23	25–17	22–25	25–20		97–85	Report

== Final phase ==
=== Semifinals ===
- The winners of the ties qualify for the finals.
- In case the teams are tied after two legs, a Golden Set is played immediately at the completion of the second leg.
- All times are local.

Team 1	Agg.	Team 2	1st leg	2nd leg
Dresdner SC (Germany)	2–4	(Italy) Reale Mutua Fenera Chieri '76	2–3	2–3
Galatasaray Daikin Istanbul (Turkey)	6–0	(Romania) C.S.O. Voluntari 2005	3–0	3–0

==== First leg ====
Date	Time		Score		Set 1	Set 2	Set 3	Set 4	Set 5	Total	Report
12 Mar	19:00	Dresdner SC (Germany)	2–3	(Italy) Reale Mutua Fenera Chieri '76	25–23	26–24	14–25	14–25	10–15	89–112	Report
11 Mar	20:30	Galatasaray Daikin Istanbul (Turkey)	3–0	(Romania) C.S.O. Voluntari 2005	25–14	25–15	25–19			75–48	Report

==== Second leg ====
Date	Time		Score		Set 1	Set 2	Set 3	Set 4	Set 5	Total	Report
18 Mar	20:00	Reale Mutua Fenera Chieri '76 (Italy)	3–2	(Germany) Dresdner SC	25–13	17–25	28–26	23–25	15–12	108–101	Report
18 Mar	19:00	C.S.O. Voluntari 2005 (Romania)	0–3	(Turkey) Galatasaray Daikin Istanbul	13–25	10–25	8–25			31–75	Report

=== Finals ===
- In case the teams are tied after two legs, a Golden Set is played immediately at the completion of the second leg.
- All times are local.

Team 1	Agg.	Team 2	1st leg	2nd leg
Reale Mutua Fenera Chieri '76 (Italy)	1–5	(Turkey) Galatasaray Daikin Istanbul	2–3	1–3

==== First leg ====
Date	Time		Score		Set 1	Set 2	Set 3	Set 4	Set 5	Total	Report
1 Apr	20:00	Reale Mutua Fenera Chieri '76 (Italy)	2–3	(Turkey) Galatasaray Daikin Istanbul	18–25	25–20	18–25	25–18	18–20	104–108	Report

==== Second leg ====
Date	Time		Score		Set 1	Set 2	Set 3	Set 4	Set 5	Total	Report
8 Apr	20:00	Galatasaray Daikin Istanbul (Turkey)	3–1	(Italy) Reale Mutua Fenera Chieri '76	25–27	25–22	25–18	25–18		100–85	Report

== Final standings ==
Rank	Team
1st place, gold medalist(s)	(Turkey) Galatasaray Daikin Istanbul
2nd place, silver medalist(s)	(Italy) Reale Mutua Fenera Chieri '76
Semifinalists	(Germany) Dresdner SC (Romania) C.S.O. Voluntari 2005

2025–26 CEV Cup winners
(Turkey)
Galatasaray Daikin Istanbul
1st title

== See also ==
- 2025–26 CEV Champions League
- 2025–26 CEV Cup
- 2025–26 CEV Challenge Cup
- 2025–26 CEV Women's Champions League
- 2025–26 CEV Women's Challenge Cup
