= 2025–26 CEV Women's Champions League =

2025–26 CEV Zeren Group Women's Champions League
- League: CEV Champions League
- Sport: Volleyball
- Duration: Qualifying round: 22 Oct – 13 Nov 2025; Main tournament: 25 Nov 2025 – 3 May 2026
- Matches: 78 (main tournament)
- Teams: Main tournament: 20; Total: 27

Finals
- Venue: (Turkey) Ülker Sports Arena, Istanbul
- Champions: (Turkey) VakifBank Istanbul
- Runners-up: (Turkey) Eczacıbaşı Istanbul
- Finals MVP: (Serbia) Tijana Bošković

CEV Women's Champions League seasons
- ← 2024–25 2026–27 →

The 2025–26 CEV Zeren Group Women's Champions League was the 66th edition of the highest level European volleyball club competition organised by the European Volleyball Confederation.

== Qualification ==
Of the 20 participating teams in the league round, 14 teams qualified directly, 2 teams were given wild cards and 4 teams qualified from the third round.

| Rank | Country | Points | No. of teams | | | Qualified teams |
| Rank | Country | Points | League | WC | Qual | Qualified teams |
|---|---|---|---|---|---|---|
| 1 | Italy | 536.66 | 3 | 1 | – | A. Carraro Prosecco Doc Conegliano |
| 1 | Italy | 536.66 | 3 | 1 | – | Numia Vero Volley Milano |
| 1 | Italy | 536.66 | 3 | 1 | – | Savino Del Bene Scandicci |
| 1 | Italy | 536.66 | 3 | 1 | – | Igor Gorgonzola Novara (wild card) |
| 2 | Turkey | 531.72 | 3 | 1 | – | VakifBank Istanbul |
| 2 | Turkey | 531.72 | 3 | 1 | – | Fenerbahçe Medicana Istanbul |
| 2 | Turkey | 531.72 | 3 | 1 | – | Eczacıbaşı Istanbul |
| 2 | Turkey | 531.72 | 3 | 1 | – | Zeren Ankara (wild card) |
| 3 | Poland | 355.33 | 3 | – | – | Developres Rzeszów |
| 3 | Poland | 355.33 | 3 | – | – | ŁKS Commercecon Łódź |
| 3 | Poland | 355.33 | 3 | – | – | PGE Budowlani Łódź |
| 5 | Germany | 221.33 | 2 | – | – | SSC Palmberg Schwerin |
| 5 | Germany | 221.33 | 2 | – | – | Dresdner SC |
| 6 | France (Note: One of France's two regular slots was changed to a qualification slot following the withdrawal by Neptunes Nantes, the second placed team in the 2024–25 season of the French volleyball league.) | 210.34 | 1 | – | 1 | Levallois Paris Saint Cloud |
| 6 | France | 210.34 | 1 | – | 1 | Volero Le Cannet |
| 8 | Serbia | 113.00 | 1 | – | – | OK Železničar Lajkovac |
| 9 | Romania | 106.33 | 1 | – | – | CS Volei Alba Blaj |
| 11 | Bulgaria | 77.00 | – | – | 1 | Maritza Plovdiv |
| 19 | Greece | 32.00 | – | – | 1 | Olympiacos Piraeus |
| N/A | Portugal | 0.00 | – | – | 1 | Sport Lisboa e Benfica |

== Pools composition ==
The drawing of lots was held on 15 July 2025 in Luxembourg City.

| Pool A | Pool B | Pool C |
|---|---|---|
| VakifBank Istanbul | Fenerbahçe Medicana Istanbul | Numia Vero Volley Milano |
| Savino Del Bene Scandicci | PGE Budowlani Łódź | Eczacıbaşı Istanbul |
| CS Volei Alba Blaj | Igor Gorgonzola Novara | OK Železničar Lajkovac |
| Volero Le Cannet | Sport Lisboa e Benfica | Olympiacos Piraeus |

| Pool D | Pool E |
|---|---|
| A. Carraro P. Doc Conegliano | Developres Rzeszów |
| ŁKS Commercecon Łódź | SSC Palmberg Schwerin |
| Dresdner SC | Levallois Paris Saint Cloud |
| Zeren Ankara | Maritza Plovdiv |

== League round ==
- The teams are split into 5 groups, each one featuring four teams.
- The top team in each pool automatically qualifies for the quarterfinals.
- All 2nd placed teams and the best 3rd placed team qualify for the playoffs.
- The remaining 3rd placed teams will compete in the quarterfinals of the 2025–26 CEV Cup.
- All times are local.

=== Pool standing procedure ===
The ranking of teams in the league round will be determined as follows:

1. Number of victories
2. Result points (3 points for 3–0 or 3–1 wins, 2 points for 3–2 win, 1 point for 2–3 loss, 0 points for 0–3 or 1–3 losses)
3. Set ratio (total sets won divided by total sets lost)
4. Points ratio (total points scored divided by total points conceded)
5. Head-to-Head results

=== Pool A ===
| Pos | Team | Pld | W | L | Pts | SW | SL | SR | SPW | SPL | SPR | Qualification |
|---|---|---|---|---|---|---|---|---|---|---|---|---|
| 1 | (Turkey) VakifBank Istanbul | 6 | 6 | 0 | 17 | 18 | 4 | 4.500 | 529 | 440 | 1.202 | Quarterfinals |
| 2 | (Italy) Savino Del Bene Scandicci | 6 | 4 | 2 | 13 | 15 | 7 | 2.143 | 521 | 445 | 1.171 | Playoffs |
| 3 | (Romania) CS Volei Alba Blaj | 6 | 1 | 5 | 3 | 5 | 16 | 0.313 | 427 | 498 | 0.857 | 2025–26 CEV Cup |
| 4 | (France) Volero Le Cannet | 6 | 1 | 5 | 3 | 5 | 16 | 0.313 | 411 | 505 | 0.814 | |

Source: CEV

| Date | Time | | Score | | Set 1 | Set 2 | Set 3 | Set 4 | Set 5 | Total | Report |
|---|---|---|---|---|---|---|---|---|---|---|---|
| 27 Nov | 19:00 | VakifBank Istanbul (Turkey) | 3–0 | (France) Volero Le Cannet | 25–19 | 25–16 | 25–19 | | | 75–54 | Report |
| 27 Nov | 20:00 | Savino Del Bene Scandicci (Italy) | 3–0 | (Romania) CS Volei Alba Blaj | 25–13 | 25–21 | 25–14 | | | 75–48 | Report |
| 2 Dec | 18:00 | CS Volei Alba Blaj (Romania) | 1–3 | (Turkey) VakifBank Istanbul | 25–21 | 23–25 | 14–25 | 21–25 | | 83–96 | Report |
| 3 Dec | 20:00 | Volero Le Cannet (France) | 1–3 | (Italy) Savino Del Bene Scandicci | 11–25 | 25–20 | 23–25 | 17–25 | | 76–95 | Report |
| 8 Jan | 20:00 | Savino Del Bene Scandicci (Italy) | 1–3 | (Turkey) VakifBank Istanbul | 24–26 | 22–25 | 25–17 | 21–25 | | 92–93 | Report |
| 8 Jan | 20:00 | Volero Le Cannet (France) | 3–1 | (Romania) CS Volei Alba Blaj | 25–23 | 21–25 | 25–22 | 25–22 | | 96–92 | Report |
| 14 Jan | 18:00 | Savino Del Bene Scandicci (Italy) | 3–0 | (France) Volero Le Cannet | 25–18 | 25–13 | 25–23 | | | 75–54 | Report |
| 14 Jan | 19:00 | VakifBank Istanbul (Turkey) | 3–0 | (Romania) CS Volei Alba Blaj | 25–19 | 25–13 | 25–20 | | | 75–52 | Report |
| 28 Jan | 18:00 | CS Volei Alba Blaj (Romania) | 0–3 | (Italy) Savino Del Bene Scandicci | 19–25 | 19–25 | 21–25 | | | 59–75 | Report |
| 28 Jan | 20:30 | Volero Le Cannet (France) | 0–3 | (Turkey) VakifBank Istanbul | 15–25 | 17–25 | 18–25 | | | 50–75 | Report |
| 4 Feb | 18:00 | CS Volei Alba Blaj (Romania) | 3–1 | (France) Volero Le Cannet | 25–17 | 18–25 | 25–20 | 25–19 | | 93–81 | Report |
| 4 Feb | 19:30 | VakifBank Istanbul (Turkey) | 3–2 | (Italy) Savino Del Bene Scandicci | 24–26 | 23–25 | 25–20 | 28–26 | 15–12 | 115–109 | Report |

=== Pool B ===
| Pos | Team | Pld | W | L | Pts | SW | SL | SR | SPW | SPL | SPR | Qualification |
|---|---|---|---|---|---|---|---|---|---|---|---|---|
| 1 | (Turkey) Fenerbahçe Medicana Istanbul | 6 | 6 | 0 | 17 | 18 | 2 | 9.000 | 487 | 368 | 1.323 | Quarterfinals |
| 2 | (Italy) Igor Gorgonzola Novara | 6 | 4 | 2 | 13 | 14 | 8 | 1.750 | 503 | 454 | 1.108 | Playoffs |
| 3 | (Poland) PGE Budowlani Łódź | 6 | 1 | 5 | 4 | 7 | 15 | 0.467 | 433 | 500 | 0.866 | 2025–26 CEV Cup |
| 4 | (Portugal) Sport Lisboa e Benfica | 6 | 1 | 5 | 2 | 3 | 17 | 0.176 | 390 | 491 | 0.794 | |

Source: CEV

| Date | Time | | Score | | Set 1 | Set 2 | Set 3 | Set 4 | Set 5 | Total | Report |
|---|---|---|---|---|---|---|---|---|---|---|---|
| 25 Nov | 18:00 | PGE Budowlani Łódź (Poland) | 1–3 | (Italy) Igor Gorgonzola Novara | 25–20 | 19–25 | 23–25 | 17–25 | | 84–95 | Report |
| 25 Nov | 19:00 | Fenerbahçe Medicana Istanbul (Turkey) | 3–0 | (Portugal) Sport Lisboa e Benfica | 25–18 | 25–19 | 25–12 | | | 75–49 | Report |
| 3 Dec | 19:00 | Sport Lisboa e Benfica (Portugal) | 3–2 | (Poland) PGE Budowlani Łódź | 14–25 | 25–19 | 26–28 | 25–20 | 15–9 | 105–101 | Report |
| 4 Dec | 18:00 | Igor Gorgonzola Novara (Italy) | 0–3 | (Turkey) Fenerbahçe Medicana Istanbul | 23–25 | 21–25 | 19–25 | | | 63–75 | Report |
| 6 Jan | 18:00 | PGE Budowlani Łódź (Poland) | 0–3 | (Turkey) Fenerbahçe Medicana Istanbul | 16–25 | 20–25 | 11–25 | | | 47–75 | Report |
| 8 Jan | 20:00 | Sport Lisboa e Benfica (Portugal) | 0–3 | (Italy) Igor Gorgonzola Novara | 20–25 | 15–25 | 29–31 | | | 64–81 | Report |
| 13 Jan | 18:00 | PGE Budowlani Łódź (Poland) | 3–0 | (Portugal) Sport Lisboa e Benfica | 28–26 | 25–13 | 25–15 | | | 78–54 | Report |
| 13 Jan | 19:00 | Fenerbahçe Medicana Istanbul (Turkey) | 3–2 | (Italy) Igor Gorgonzola Novara | 20–25 | 25–22 | 25–12 | 20–25 | 15–10 | 105–94 | Report |
| 29 Jan | 18:00 | Igor Gorgonzola Novara (Italy) | 3–1 | (Poland) PGE Budowlani Łódź | 20–25 | 25–17 | 25–22 | 25–10 | | 95–74 | Report |
| 29 Jan | 20:00 | Sport Lisboa e Benfica (Portugal) | 0–3 | (Turkey) Fenerbahçe Medicana Istanbul | 20–25 | 29–31 | 17–25 | | | 66–81 | Report |
| 4 Feb | 18:00 | Igor Gorgonzola Novara (Italy) | 3–0 | (Portugal) Sport Lisboa e Benfica | 25–20 | 25–17 | 25–15 | | | 75–52 | Report |
| 4 Feb | 19:00 | Fenerbahçe Medicana Istanbul (Turkey) | 3–0 | (Poland) PGE Budowlani Łódź | 25–8 | 25–17 | 26–24 | | | 76–49 | Report |

=== Pool C ===
| Pos | Team | Pld | W | L | Pts | SW | SL | SR | SPW | SPL | SPR | Qualification |
|---|---|---|---|---|---|---|---|---|---|---|---|---|
| 1 | (Turkey) Eczacıbaşı Istanbul | 6 | 5 | 1 | 14 | 17 | 7 | 2.429 | 544 | 457 | 1.190 | Quarterfinals |
| 2 | (Italy) Numia Vero Volley Milano | 6 | 4 | 2 | 14 | 16 | 7 | 2.286 | 534 | 463 | 1.153 | Playoffs |
| 3 | (Greece) Olympiacos Piraeus | 6 | 3 | 3 | 8 | 10 | 13 | 0.769 | 483 | 531 | 0.910 | Playoffs |
| 4 | (Serbia) OK Železničar Lajkovac | 6 | 0 | 6 | 0 | 2 | 18 | 0.111 | 382 | 492 | 0.776 | |

Source: CEV

| Date | Time | | Score | | Set 1 | Set 2 | Set 3 | Set 4 | Set 5 | Total | Report |
|---|---|---|---|---|---|---|---|---|---|---|---|
| 26 Nov | 19:30 | Eczacıbaşı Istanbul (Turkey) | 3–0 | (Serbia) OK Železničar Lajkovac | 25–12 | 25–16 | 25–17 | | | 75–45 | Report |
| 26 Nov | 20:00 | Numia Vero Volley Milano (Italy) | 3–0 | (Greece) Olympiacos Piraeus | 25–18 | 27–25 | 25–16 | | | 77–59 | Report |
| 2 Dec | 20:00 | Olympiacos Piraeus (Greece) | 3–2 | (Turkey) Eczacıbaşı Istanbul | 21–25 | 25–16 | 19–25 | 26–24 | 18–16 | 109–106 | Report |
| 3 Dec | 19:00 | OK Železničar Lajkovac (Serbia) | 0–3 | (Italy) Numia Vero Volley Milano | 20–25 | 15–25 | 22–25 | | | 57–75 | Report |
| 7 Jan | 19:30 | Eczacıbaşı Istanbul (Turkey) | 3–2 | (Italy) Numia Vero Volley Milano | 25–21 | 20–25 | 22–25 | 25–22 | 15–13 | 107–106 | Report |
| 8 Jan | 19:00 | Olympiacos Piraeus (Greece) | 3–1 | (Serbia) OK Železničar Lajkovac | 20–25 | 25–18 | 25–23 | 25–17 | | 95–83 | Report |
| 14 Jan | 20:00 | Numia Vero Volley Milano (Italy) | 3–0 | (Serbia) OK Železničar Lajkovac | 25–16 | 25–16 | 29–27 | | | 79–59 | Report |
| 15 Jan | 19:00 | Eczacıbaşı Istanbul (Turkey) | 3–0 | (Greece) Olympiacos Piraeus | 25–18 | 25–15 | 25–19 | | | 75–52 | Report |
| 27 Jan | 19:00 | Olympiacos Piraeus (Greece) | 1–3 | (Italy) Numia Vero Volley Milano | 27–25 | 17–25 | 17–25 | 14–25 | | 75–100 | Report |
| 28 Jan | 19:00 | OK Železničar Lajkovac (Serbia) | 0–3 | (Turkey) Eczacıbaşı Istanbul | 15–25 | 16–25 | 17–25 | | | 48–75 | Report |
| 4 Feb | 19:00 | OK Železničar Lajkovac (Serbia) | 1–3 | (Greece) Olympiacos Piraeus | 25–15 | 17–25 | 22–25 | 26–28 | | 90–93 | Report |
| 4 Feb | 20:00 | Numia Vero Volley Milano (Italy) | 2–3 | (Turkey) Eczacıbaşı Istanbul | 25–20 | 18–25 | 16–25 | 25–21 | 13–15 | 97–106 | Report |

=== Pool D ===
| Pos | Team | Pld | W | L | Pts | SW | SL | SR | SPW | SPL | SPR | Qualification |
|---|---|---|---|---|---|---|---|---|---|---|---|---|
| 1 | (Italy) A. Carraro P. Doc Conegliano | 6 | 6 | 0 | 17 | 18 | 2 | 9.000 | 492 | 378 | 1.302 | Quarterfinals |
| 2 | (Turkey) Zeren Ankara | 6 | 4 | 2 | 13 | 14 | 6 | 2.333 | 477 | 425 | 1.122 | Playoffs |
| 3 | (Germany) Dresdner SC | 6 | 2 | 4 | 6 | 6 | 13 | 0.462 | 389 | 454 | 0.857 | 2025–26 CEV Cup |
| 4 | (Poland) ŁKS Commercecon Łódź | 6 | 0 | 6 | 0 | 1 | 18 | 0.056 | 370 | 471 | 0.786 | |

Source: CEV

| Date | Time | | Score | | Set 1 | Set 2 | Set 3 | Set 4 | Set 5 | Total | Report |
|---|---|---|---|---|---|---|---|---|---|---|---|
| 25 Nov | 20:30 | A. Carraro P. Doc Conegliano (Italy) | 3–2 | (Turkey) Zeren Ankara | 23–25 | 26–24 | 23–25 | 25–22 | 20–18 | 117–114 | Report |
| 26 Nov | 20:30 | ŁKS Commercecon Łódź (Poland) | 1–3 | (Germany) Dresdner SC | 24–26 | 20–25 | 25–17 | 23–25 | | 92–93 | Report |
| 2 Dec | 19:00 | Dresdner SC (Germany) | 0–3 | (Italy) A. Carraro P. Doc Conegliano | 12–25 | 17–25 | 17–25 | | | 46–75 | Report |
| 3 Dec | 18:00 | Zeren Ankara (Turkey) | 3–0 | (Poland) ŁKS Commercecon Łódź | 25–19 | 27–25 | 25–20 | | | 77–64 | Report |
| 7 Jan | 17:00 | Zeren Ankara (Turkey) | 3–0 | (Germany) Dresdner SC | 26–24 | 25–18 | 25–16 | | | 76–58 | Report |
| 7 Jan | 18:00 | ŁKS Commercecon Łódź (Poland) | 0–3 | (Italy) A. Carraro P. Doc Conegliano | 14–25 | 23–25 | 13–25 | | | 50–75 | Report |
| 14 Jan | 20:30 | ŁKS Commercecon Łódź (Poland) | 0–3 | (Turkey) Zeren Ankara | 21–25 | 18–25 | 17–25 | | | 56–75 | Report |
| 15 Jan | 20:30 | A. Carraro P. Doc Conegliano (Italy) | 3–0 | (Germany) Dresdner SC | 25–19 | 25–23 | 25–19 | | | 75–61 | Report |
| 27 Jan | 18:00 | Zeren Ankara (Turkey) | 0–3 | (Italy) A. Carraro P. Doc Conegliano | 21–25 | 18–25 | 21–25 | | | 60–75 | Report |
| 28 Jan | 19:00 | Dresdner SC (Germany) | 3–0 | (Poland) ŁKS Commercecon Łódź | 25–18 | 25–19 | 26–24 | | | 76–61 | Report |
| 4 Feb | 19:00 | Dresdner SC (Germany) | 0–3 | (Turkey) Zeren Ankara | 17–25 | 22–25 | 16–25 | | | 55–75 | Report |
| 4 Feb | 20:30 | A. Carraro P. Doc Conegliano (Italy) | 3–0 | (Poland) ŁKS Commercecon Łódź | 25–17 | 25–18 | 25–12 | | | 75–47 | Report |

=== Pool E ===
| Pos | Team | Pld | W | L | Pts | SW | SL | SR | SPW | SPL | SPR | Qualification |
|---|---|---|---|---|---|---|---|---|---|---|---|---|
| 1 | (Poland) Developres Rzeszów | 6 | 5 | 1 | 15 | 17 | 7 | 2.429 | 568 | 487 | 1.166 | Quarterfinals |
| 2 | (Germany) SSC Palmberg Schwerin | 6 | 3 | 3 | 10 | 13 | 12 | 1.083 | 545 | 538 | 1.013 | Playoffs |
| 3 | (France) Levallois Paris Saint Cloud | 6 | 3 | 3 | 6 | 12 | 15 | 0.800 | 568 | 605 | 0.939 | 2025–26 CEV Cup |
| 4 | (Bulgaria) Maritza Plovdiv | 6 | 1 | 5 | 5 | 8 | 16 | 0.500 | 497 | 548 | 0.907 | |

Source: CEV

| Date | Time | | Score | | Set 1 | Set 2 | Set 3 | Set 4 | Set 5 | Total | Report |
|---|---|---|---|---|---|---|---|---|---|---|---|
| 26 Nov | 18:00 | Developres Rzeszów (Poland) | 3–1 | (Bulgaria) Maritza Plovdiv | 25–19 | 25–27 | 25–18 | 25–16 | | 100–80 | Report |
| 27 Nov | 18:00 | SSC Palmberg Schwerin (Germany) | 3–1 | (France) Levallois Paris Saint Cloud | 25–22 | 17–25 | 25–15 | 25–20 | | 92–82 | Report |
| 2 Dec | 18:30 | Maritza Plovdiv (Bulgaria) | 2–3 | (Germany) SSC Palmberg Schwerin | 21–25 | 25–22 | 25–22 | 20–25 | 12–15 | 103–109 | Report |
| 4 Dec | 20:00 | Levallois Paris Saint Cloud (France) | 3–2 | (Poland) Developres Rzeszów | 25–22 | 25–19 | 17–25 | 13–25 | 15–13 | 95–104 | Report |
| 7 Jan | 18:30 | Maritza Plovdiv (Bulgaria) | 3–1 | (France) Levallois Paris Saint Cloud | 25–22 | 18–25 | 25–22 | 25–15 | | 93–84 | Report |
| 8 Jan | 18:00 | SSC Palmberg Schwerin (Germany) | 2–3 | (Poland) Developres Rzeszów | 19–25 | 25–22 | 20–25 | 25–22 | 12–15 | 101–109 | Report |
| 14 Jan | 18:00 | Developres Rzeszów (Poland) | 3–1 | (France) Levallois Paris Saint Cloud | 25–27 | 28–26 | 25–13 | 27–25 | | 105–91 | Report |
| 15 Jan | 18:00 | SSC Palmberg Schwerin (Germany) | 3–0 | (Bulgaria) Maritza Plovdiv | 25–20 | 25–21 | 25–17 | | | 75–58 | Report |
| 27 Jan | 18:30 | Maritza Plovdiv (Bulgaria) | 0–3 | (Poland) Developres Rzeszów | 20–25 | 16–25 | 21–25 | | | 57–75 | Report |
| 28 Jan | 20:00 | Levallois Paris Saint Cloud (France) | 3–2 | (Germany) SSC Palmberg Schwerin | 21–25 | 25–27 | 25–23 | 25–21 | 15–9 | 111–105 | Report |
| 4 Feb | 18:00 | Developres Rzeszów (Poland) | 3–0 | (Germany) SSC Palmberg Schwerin | 25–23 | 25–21 | 25–19 | | | 75–63 | Report |
| 4 Feb | 20:00 | Levallois Paris Saint Cloud (France) | 3–2 | (Bulgaria) Maritza Plovdiv | 26–24 | 22–25 | 17–25 | 25–22 | 15–10 | 105–106 | Report |

=== First place ranking ===
| Pos | Team | Pld | W | L | Pts | SW | SL | SR | SPW | SPL | SPR | Qualification |
|---|---|---|---|---|---|---|---|---|---|---|---|---|
| 1 | (Turkey) Fenerbahçe Medicana Istanbul | 6 | 6 | 0 | 17 | 18 | 2 | 9.000 | 487 | 368 | 1.323 | Quarterfinals |
| 2 | (Italy) A. Carraro P. Doc Conegliano | 6 | 6 | 0 | 17 | 18 | 2 | 9.000 | 492 | 378 | 1.302 | Quarterfinals |
| 3 | (Turkey) VakifBank Istanbul | 6 | 6 | 0 | 17 | 18 | 4 | 4.500 | 529 | 440 | 1.202 | Quarterfinals |
| 4 | (Poland) Developres Rzeszów | 6 | 5 | 1 | 15 | 17 | 7 | 2.429 | 568 | 487 | 1.166 | Quarterfinals |
| 5 | (Turkey) Eczacıbaşı Istanbul | 6 | 5 | 1 | 14 | 17 | 7 | 2.429 | 544 | 457 | 1.190 | Quarterfinals |

Source: CEV

=== Second place ranking ===
| Pos | Team | Pld | W | L | Pts | SW | SL | SR | SPW | SPL | SPR | Qualification |
|---|---|---|---|---|---|---|---|---|---|---|---|---|
| 1 | (Italy) Numia Vero Volley Milano | 6 | 4 | 2 | 14 | 16 | 7 | 2.286 | 534 | 463 | 1.153 | Playoffs |
| 2 | (Turkey) Zeren Ankara | 6 | 4 | 2 | 13 | 14 | 6 | 2.333 | 477 | 425 | 1.122 | Playoffs |
| 3 | (Italy) Savino Del Bene Scandicci | 6 | 4 | 2 | 13 | 15 | 7 | 2.143 | 521 | 445 | 1.171 | Playoffs |
| 4 | (Italy) Igor Gorgonzola Novara | 6 | 4 | 2 | 13 | 14 | 8 | 1.750 | 503 | 454 | 1.108 | Playoffs |
| 5 | (Germany) SSC Palmberg Schwerin | 6 | 3 | 3 | 10 | 13 | 12 | 1.083 | 545 | 538 | 1.013 | Playoffs |

Source: CEV

=== Third place ranking ===
| Pos | Team | Pld | W | L | Pts | SW | SL | SR | SPW | SPL | SPR | Qualification |
|---|---|---|---|---|---|---|---|---|---|---|---|---|
| 1 | (Greece) Olympiacos Piraeus | 6 | 3 | 3 | 8 | 10 | 13 | 0.769 | 483 | 531 | 0.910 | Playoffs |
| 2 | (France) Levallois Paris Saint Cloud | 6 | 3 | 3 | 6 | 12 | 15 | 0.800 | 568 | 605 | 0.939 | 2025–26 CEV Cup |
| 3 | (Germany) Dresdner SC | 6 | 2 | 4 | 6 | 6 | 13 | 0.462 | 389 | 454 | 0.857 | 2025–26 CEV Cup |
| 4 | (Poland) PGE Budowlani Łódź | 6 | 1 | 5 | 4 | 7 | 15 | 0.467 | 433 | 500 | 0.866 | 2025–26 CEV Cup |
| 5 | (Romania) CS Volei Alba Blaj | 6 | 1 | 5 | 3 | 5 | 16 | 0.313 | 427 | 498 | 0.857 | 2025–26 CEV Cup |

Source: CEV

== Bracket ==
Playoff 6
(Greece) Olympiacos Piraeus | 0 | 0
(Italy) Numia Vero Volley Milano | 3 | 3
(Germany) SSC Palmberg Schwerin | 1 | 0
(Turkey) Zeren Ankara | 3 | 3
(Italy) Igor Gorgonzola Novara | 3 | 1 | 7
(Italy) Savino Del Bene Scandicci | 1 | 3 | 15

Quarterfinals
(Italy) Numia Vero Volley Milano | 2 | 2
(Turkey) VakifBank Istanbul | 3 | 3
(Turkey) Zeren Ankara | 0 | 3
(Italy) A. Carraro P. Doc Conegliano | 3 | 2
(Turkey) Eczacıbaşı Istanbul | 3 | 2
(Poland) Developres Rzeszów | 1 | 3
(Italy) Savino Del Bene Scandicci | 3 | 1 | 15
(Turkey) Fenerbahçe Medicana Istanbul | 0 | 3 | 13

Semifinals
(Turkey) VakifBank Istanbul | 3
(Italy) A. Carraro P. Doc Conegliano | 2
(Turkey) Eczacıbaşı Istanbul | 3
(Italy) Savino Del Bene Scandicci | 2

Final
(Turkey) VakifBank Istanbul | 3
(Turkey) Eczacıbaşı Istanbul | 1
Third place
(Italy) A. Carraro P. Doc Conegliano | 3
(Italy) Savino Del Bene Scandicci | 0

== Playoff 6 ==
- The winners of the ties qualify for the quarterfinals.
- In case the teams are tied after two legs, a Golden Set is played immediately at the completion of the second leg.
- All times are local.

| Team 1 | Agg. | Team 2 | 1st leg | 2nd leg | Golden Set |
|---|---|---|---|---|---|
| Olympiacos Piraeus (Greece) | 0–6 | (Italy) Numia Vero Volley Milano | 0–3 | 0–3 | |
| SSC Palmberg Schwerin (Germany) | 0–6 | (Turkey) Zeren Ankara | 1–3 | 0–3 | |
| Igor Gorgonzola Novara (Italy) | 3–3 | (Italy) Savino Del Bene Scandicci | 3–1 | 1–3 | 7–15 |

=== First leg ===
| Date | Time | | Score | | Set 1 | Set 2 | Set 3 | Set 4 | Set 5 | Total | Report |
|---|---|---|---|---|---|---|---|---|---|---|---|
| 17 Feb | 19:00 | Olympiacos Piraeus (Greece) | 0–3 | (Italy) Numia Vero Volley Milano | 20–25 | 21–25 | 17–25 | | | 58–75 | Report |
| 17 Feb | 18:00 | SSC Palmberg Schwerin (Germany) | 1–3 | (Turkey) Zeren Ankara | 21–25 | 21–25 | 25–21 | 14–25 | | 81–96 | Report |
| 18 Feb | 18:00 | Igor Gorgonzola Novara (Italy) | 3–1 | (Italy) Savino Del Bene Scandicci | 25–22 | 25–21 | 22–25 | 25–23 | | 97–91 | Report |

=== Second leg ===
| Date | Time | | Score | | Set 1 | Set 2 | Set 3 | Set 4 | Set 5 | Total | Report |
|---|---|---|---|---|---|---|---|---|---|---|---|
| 25 Feb | 20:30 | Numia Vero Volley Milano (Italy) | 3–0 | (Greece) Olympiacos Piraeus | 25–12 | 25–18 | 25–11 | | | 75–41 | Report |
| 24 Feb | 20:00 | Zeren Ankara (Turkey) | 3–0 | (Germany) SSC Palmberg Schwerin | 25–16 | 25–18 | 25–14 | | | 75–48 | Report |
| 25 Feb | 18:00 | Savino Del Bene Scandicci (Italy) | 3–1 | (Italy) Igor Gorgonzola Novara | 24–26 | 25–17 | 25–15 | 25–21 | | 99–79 | Report |
| Golden set | | Savino Del Bene Scandicci (Italy) | 15–7 | (Italy) Igor Gorgonzola Novara | | | | | | | |

== Quarterfinals ==
- The winners of the ties qualify for the final four.
- In case the teams are tied after two legs, a Golden Set is played immediately at the completion of the second leg.
- All times are local.

| Team 1 | Agg. | Team 2 | 1st leg | 2nd leg | Golden Set |
|---|---|---|---|---|---|
| Numia Vero Volley Milano (Italy) | 2–4 | (Turkey) VakifBank Istanbul | 2–3 | 2–3 | |
| Zeren Ankara (Turkey) | 2–4 | (Italy) A. Carraro P. Doc Conegliano | 0–3 | 3–2 | |
| Eczacıbaşı Istanbul (Turkey) | 4–2 | (Poland) Developres Rzeszów | 3–1 | 2–3 | |
| Savino Del Bene Scandicci (Italy) | 3–3 | (Turkey) Fenerbahçe Medicana Istanbul | 3–0 | 1–3 | 15–13 |

=== First leg ===
| Date | Time | | Score | | Set 1 | Set 2 | Set 3 | Set 4 | Set 5 | Total | Report |
|---|---|---|---|---|---|---|---|---|---|---|---|
| 10 Mar | 20:00 | Numia Vero Volley Milano (Italy) | 2–3 | (Turkey) VakifBank Istanbul | 26–24 | 25–22 | 22–25 | 22–25 | 11–15 | 106–111 | Report |
| 11 Mar | 20:00 | Zeren Ankara (Turkey) | 0–3 | (Italy) A. Carraro P. Doc Conegliano | 21–25 | 18–25 | 17–25 | | | 56–75 | Report |
| 11 Mar | 19:00 | Eczacıbaşı Istanbul (Turkey) | 3–1 | (Poland) Developres Rzeszów | 22–25 | 25–12 | 25–20 | 25–23 | | 97–80 | Report |
| 11 Mar | 19:00 | Savino Del Bene Scandicci (Italy) | 3–0 | (Turkey) Fenerbahçe Medicana Istanbul | 25–23 | 31–29 | 25–19 | | | 81–71 | Report |

=== Second leg ===
| Date | Time | | Score | | Set 1 | Set 2 | Set 3 | Set 4 | Set 5 | Total | Report |
|---|---|---|---|---|---|---|---|---|---|---|---|
| 19 Mar | 20:00 | VakifBank Istanbul (Turkey) | 3–2 | (Italy) Numia Vero Volley Milano | 25–22 | 16–25 | 25–16 | 23–25 | 15–12 | 104–100 | Report |
| 18 Mar | 20:30 | A. Carraro P. Doc Conegliano (Italy) | 2–3 | (Turkey) Zeren Ankara | 25–21 | 25–17 | 19–25 | 30–32 | 13–15 | 112–110 | Report |
| 18 Mar | 20:30 | Developres Rzeszów (Poland) | 3–2 | (Turkey) Eczacıbaşı Istanbul | 17–25 | 17–25 | 25–23 | 25–15 | 15–12 | 99–100 | Report |
| 19 Mar | 17:00 | Fenerbahçe Medicana Istanbul (Turkey) | 3–1 | (Italy) Savino Del Bene Scandicci | 32–30 | 19–25 | 25–13 | 27–25 | | 103–93 | Report |
| Golden set | | Fenerbahçe Medicana Istanbul (Turkey) | 13–15 | (Italy) Savino Del Bene Scandicci | | | | | | | |

== Final four ==
- Place: Ülker Sports Arena, Istanbul.
- Time: Turkey Time (UTC+03:00).

=== Semifinals ===
| Date | Time | | Score | | Set 1 | Set 2 | Set 3 | Set 4 | Set 5 | Total | Report |
|---|---|---|---|---|---|---|---|---|---|---|---|
| 2 May | 17:00 | VakifBank Istanbul (Turkey) | 3–2 | (Italy) A. Carraro P. Doc Conegliano | 22–25 | 18–25 | 29–27 | 25–23 | 15–11 | 109–111 | Report |
| 2 May | 20:00 | Eczacıbaşı Istanbul (Turkey) | 3–2 | (Italy) Savino Del Bene Scandicci | 20–25 | 25–20 | 25–17 | 21–25 | 15–8 | 106–95 | Report |

=== 3rd place match ===
| Date | Time | | Score | | Set 1 | Set 2 | Set 3 | Set 4 | Set 5 | Total | Report |
|---|---|---|---|---|---|---|---|---|---|---|---|
| 3 May | 17:00 | A. Carraro P. Doc Conegliano (Italy) | 3–0 | (Italy) Savino Del Bene Scandicci | 25–16 | 26–24 | 27–25 | | | 78–65 | Report |

=== Final ===
| Date | Time | | Score | | Set 1 | Set 2 | Set 3 | Set 4 | Set 5 | Total | Report |
|---|---|---|---|---|---|---|---|---|---|---|---|
| 3 May | 20:00 | VakifBank Istanbul (Turkey) | 3–1 | (Turkey) Eczacıbaşı Istanbul | 25–20 | 25–21 | 21–25 | 25–18 | | 96–84 | Report |

== Final standings ==
| Rank | Team |
|---|---|
| 1st place, gold medalist(s) | (Turkey) VakifBank Istanbul |
| 2nd place, silver medalist(s) | (Turkey) Eczacıbaşı Istanbul |
| 3rd place, bronze medalist(s) | (Italy) A. Carraro P. Doc Conegliano |
| 4 | (Italy) Savino Del Bene Scandicci |

2025–26 CEV Champions League winners
(Turkey)
VakifBank Istanbul
7th title

== Awards ==
- Most Valuable Player: (Serbia) Tijana Bošković (Vakıfbank)

Dream Team
| S | (Poland) Joanna Wołosz | (Imoco Volley) |
| OP | (Serbia) Tijana Bošković | (Vakıfbank) |
| OH | (Russia) Marina Markova | (Vakıfbank) |
| OH | (Turkey) Ebrar Karakurt | (Eczacıbaşı) |
| MB | (Trinidad and Tobago) (Turkey) Sinead Jack Kısal | (Eczacıbaşı) |
| MB | (Turkey) Zehra Güneş | (Vakıfbank) |
| L | (Turkey) Simge Aköz | (Eczacıbaşı) |

== See also ==
- 2025–26 CEV Champions League
- 2025–26 CEV Cup
- 2025–26 CEV Challenge Cup
- 2025–26 Women's CEV Cup
- 2025–26 CEV Women's Challenge Cup
