= Macedonian Women's Volleyball League =

Women's volleyball competition

Macedonian Volleyball League
- Current season, competition or edition: 2020–21 Macedonian Volleyball Women's League
- Sport: Volleyball
- Founded: 1992
- First season: 1993
- Administrator: ОФК
- No. of teams: 14 (2020–21)
- Country: North Macedonia
- Continent: Europe
- Most recent champion: ŽOK Vardar Skopje (1st title)
- Most titles: Rabotnicki Skopje(11 titles)
- Level on pyramid: 1 Level
- Relegation to: 2nd League
- Domestic cups: North Macedonia Cup; North Macedonia Super Cup
- International cup: CEV Women's Champions League Qualifications

The Macedonian Women's Volleyball League is an annual competition for women's volleyball clubs in North Macedonia. It has been held since the 1992/93 season.

== History ==
14 teams has participated in the 2020/21 championship in the 1st league: Vardar (Skopje), Kisela Voda [1] (Skopje), Strumica, Rabotnichki (Skopje), Nakovski Volley (Strumica), "Universitet" (Tetovo), "Fit-Fan" (Skopje), "Pelister" (Bitola), "Yanta-Forza" (Skopje), "Macedonia-Max" (Strumica), "UGD-Student" (Shtip), "Uskana" (Kichevo), "Victory Will" (Strumitsa), "Bami Kor" (Tetovo). The title was won by "Kisela Voda", which won the final series beating "Vardar" 3-1 (3: 0, 3: 1, 2: 3, 3: 2). 3rd place was taken by "Strumitsa".

=== List of champions ===
Years	Champions	Runners up	Third place
1993	Rabotnički Skopje		
1994	Makedoniâ Strumica		
1995	Makedoniâ Strumica		
1996	Rabotnički Skopje		
1997	Rabotnički-Feršped Skopje		
1998	Rabotnički-Feršped Skopje		
1999	Rabotnički-Feršped Skopje		
2000	Rabotnički-Feršped Skopje		
2001	Kometal-Student Strumica	Rabotnički-Feršped Skopje	
2002	Student-Kometal Strumica	Rabotnički-Feršped Skopje	
2003	Student-Kometal Strumica		
2004	Rabotnički-Feršped Skopje		
2005	Student-Kometal Strumica		
2006	Rabotnički-Feršped Skopje	Student-Kometal Strumica	
2007	Rabotnički-Feršped Skopje		
2008	Forca Volej Skopje	Rabotnički-Feršped Skopje	
2009	Forca Volej Skopje	Rabotnički Skopje	
2010	Forca Volej Skopje	Rabotnički Skopje	
2011	Forca Volej Skopje		
2012	Forca Volej Skopje	Foršped Veles	
2013	Forca Volej Skopje	Makedoniâ Maks	
2014	Forca Volej Skopje	Janta Volej	
2015	ŽOK Rabotnički	Janta Volej	
2016	Janta Volej	ŽOK Rabotnički	
2017	SVSK Koumanovo	Janta Volej	
2018	Janta Volej	SVSK Koumanovo	
2019	ŽOK Rabotnički	OK Rabotnički Ženi	
2020	ŽOK Janta Volej Kisela Voda	VC Janta Volej Kisela VodaStopped Due Covid 19	
2021	ŽOK Janta Volej Kisela Voda	VC Janta Volej Kisela Voda	
2022	ŽOK Rabotnički	OK Rabotnički Ženi	
2023	ŽOK Rabotnički	OK Rabotnički Ženi	
