= Janta Volej =

Macedonian women's volleyball club

- Full name: Janta Volej Kisela Voda
- Founded: 2005
- Ground: ES "Nevena Gjeorgjieva - Dunja", Skopje
- Chairman: (North Macedonia) Goran Janevikj
- Head coach: (North Macedonia) Nikola Janevikj
- Captain: (North Macedonia) Tamara Tasevska
- League: (North Macedonia) Women's Volleyball First League
- 2024–25: (gold) 1st

Uniforms
| Home | Away |

Janta Volej is a Macedonian women's volleyball club based in Kisela Voda (Skopje). The team was founded in 2005. They finished first in the Macedonian Women's Volleyball League in 2016, 2018, 2021, and 2025. They participated in the CEV Women's Champions League in 2025. The team captain is Tamara Tasevska.

== Players ==
=== 2025−26 team ===
As of 22 November 2025

| Number | Name | Birthyear | Height (cm) | Position |
|---|---|---|---|---|
| 1 | (North Macedonia) Ana Gjorgjievska | 2007 | 179 | Opposite |
| 2 | (North Macedonia) Meri Boshkovska | 2005 | 186 | Outside spiker |
| 4 | (North Macedonia) Evangelina Vasileva | 2006 | 178 | Middle blocker |
| 6 | (North Macedonia) Bojana Marojevikj | 2002 | 180 | Outside spiker |
| 7 | (North Macedonia) Eva Hristoska | 2007 | 177 | Middle blocker |
| 8 | (North Macedonia) Iva Simonovska | 2006 | 181 | Opposite |
| 9 | (North Macedonia) Tamara Tasevska | 1999 | 175 | Middle blocker |
| 10 | (Argentina) Jazmín Ledesma | 2006 | 184 | Middle blocker |
| 11 | (Ukraine) Tetyana Yanevik | 1998 | 184 | Middle blocker |
| 12 | (North Macedonia) Simona Nakovska | 2008 | 179 | Opposite |
| 13 | (North Macedonia) Ana Starčević | 2004 | 187 | Setter |
| 15 | (North Macedonia) Iva Ilieva | 2007 | 169 | Setter |
| 17 | (North Macedonia) Tea Zareva | 2003 | 170 | Setter |
| 20 | (North Macedonia) Tijana Spasovska | 2006 | 165 | Libero |
| 22 | (North Macedonia) Nadica Anteska | 2004 | 170 | Libero |
| 0 | (North Macedonia) Biljana Jakovlevska | 2007 | 182 | Setter |

Head coach: Nikola Janevikj
Assistant coach: Djenis Martinovic
Assistant coach: Hristian Nedelkovski

Source: European Volleyball Confederation

=== European Qualifiers ===
| 22 Oct | 20:00 | Janta Volej Kisela Voda (North Macedonia) | 3–2 | (Bosnia and Herzegovina) ŽOK Gacko RD Swisslion | 25–21 | 21–25 | 25–22 | 20–25 | 18–16 | 109–109 | Report |
| 29 Oct | 18:00 | ŽOK Gacko RD Swisslion (Bosnia and Herzegovina) | 2–3 | (North Macedonia) Janta Volej Kisela Voda | 24–26 | 25–21 | 25–19 | 18–25 | 13–15 | 105–106 | Report |
| 4 Nov | 18:00 | Janta Volej Kisela Voda (North Macedonia) | 1–3 | (France) Volero Le Cannet | 15–25 | 10–25 | 25–20 | 9–25 | | 59–95 | Report |
| 13 Nov | 20:30 | Volero Le Cannet (France) | 3–0 | (North Macedonia) Janta Volej Kisela Voda | 25–6 | 25–13 | 25–13 | | | 75–32 | Report |
CEV Champions League |
