= CSM Corona Brașov =

Romanian sports club

Corona Brașov
- Full name: Clubul Sportiv Municipal Corona Brașov
- Nickname: Corona (The Crown); galben-albaștrii (The yellow and Blues)
- Short name: Corona
- Founded: 29 March 2019; 7 years ago martie
- Location: Sala „Dumitru Popescu Colibași” Patinoarul Olimpic Brasov; Bazinul Olimpic Brașov
- Colours: Yellow, Blue
- President: Radu Miclăuș
- Website: coronabrasov.ro/%20Pagina%20oficială

CSM Corona Brașov is a municipal sports club in Brașov, Romania, established in 2019. As of 2025, 12 different sports are represented within the club. The club includes sections for handball, ice hockey, speed skating and figure skating, alpine skiing, swimming, water polo, and fencing.

CSM Corona Brașov is the successor to Asociația Sport Club Corona 2010 Brașov (ASC Corona 2010 Brașov)—a private sports club established in 2010—which operated nine sections: handball, ice hockey, skiing and biathlon, figure skating, speed skating, water polo, swimming, fencing, and football; all of these sections have been fully taken over by CSM Corona Brașov.

Teams include:

- Corona Brașov (women's handball)
- CSM Corona Brașov (football)
- CSM Corona Brașov (ice hockey)
- Corona Brașov (men's volleyball)
