= Volero Le Cannet =

Volero Le Cannet is a French professional volleyball club based in Le Cannet. It was formed by the elite team of Volero Zürich joining Entente sportive Le Cannet-Rocheville.

== Team ==
As of December 2018. The following is the roster of the club in the 2018 FIVB Volleyball Women's Club World Championship.

- Head coach: (Netherlands) Avital Selinger

No.	Name	Date of birth	Height	Weight	Spike	Block
1	(Russia) Angelina Lazarenko	13 April 1998	1.93 m (6 ft 4 in)	80 kg (180 lb)	320 cm (130 in)	305 cm (120 in)
3	(Cuba) Heidy Casanova	6 November 1998	1.84 m (6 ft 0 in)	78 kg (172 lb)	244 cm (96 in)	240 cm (94 in)
5	(Bulgaria) Gergana Dimitrova	28 February 1996	1.84 m (6 ft 0 in)	71 kg (157 lb)	305 cm (120 in)	288 cm (113 in)
6	(France) Déborah Ortschitt	10 June 1987	1.65 m (5 ft 5 in)	55 kg (121 lb)	292 cm (115 in)	280 cm (110 in)
7	(Azerbaijan) Olena Hasanova	25 November 1995	1.87 m (6 ft 2 in)	72 kg (159 lb)	305 cm (120 in)	300 cm (120 in)
8	(Bulgaria) Mira Todorova	12 April 1994	1.87 m (6 ft 2 in)	70 kg (150 lb)	312 cm (123 in)	300 cm (120 in)
9	(Cuba) Liset Herrera	6 December 1998	1.92 m (6 ft 4 in)	70 kg (150 lb)	311 cm (122 in)	300 cm (120 in)
10	(Serbia) Ana Bjelica	3 April 1992	1.90 m (6 ft 3 in)	78 kg (172 lb)	310 cm (120 in)	305 cm (120 in)
11	(Slovenia) Eva Mori	13 March 1996	1.86 m (6 ft 1 in)	67 kg (148 lb)	305 cm (120 in)	275 cm (108 in)
12	(Russia) Rosir Calderón	28 December 1984	1.91 m (6 ft 3 in)	76 kg (168 lb)	330 cm (130 in)	325 cm (128 in)
13	(Russia) Anastasia Kornienko	9 September 1992	1.83 m (6 ft 0 in)	68 kg (150 lb)	295 cm (116 in)	290 cm (110 in)
15	(France) Joyce Agbolossou	15 January 2002	1.83 m (6 ft 0 in)	68 kg (150 lb)	300 cm (120 in)	290 cm (110 in)
16	(France) Amandine Giardino (L)	30 March 1995	1.72 m (5 ft 8 in)	65 kg (143 lb)	275 cm (108 in)	260 cm (100 in)
17	(Switzerland) Laura Unternährer (C)	11 July 1993	1.79 m (5 ft 10 in)	70 kg (150 lb)	303 cm (119 in)	283 cm (111 in)
