= 2010 Men's European Volleyball League =

Tournament details
- Host country: Spain
- Dates: June 4 – July 11 (qualification); July 16 – 17 (final four)
- Teams: 8
- Venue: 1 (in 1 host city)

Final positions
- Champions: Portugal (1st title)

Tournament awards
- MVP: (Portugal) Valdir Sequeira

The 2010 Men's European Volleyball League was the seventh edition of the annual Men's European Volleyball League, which featured men's national volleyball teams from eight European countries: Austria, Great Britain, Greece, Portugal, Romania, Slovakia, Spain, and Turkey.^{[1]} A preliminary league round was played from June 4 to July 11, and the final four tournament was held at the Polideportivo Aguas Vivas hall, in Guadalajara, Spain, on July 16 and 17.^{[2]}

During the league round, competing nations were drawn into two pools of four teams, and played each other in a double round-robin system, with two matches per leg in a total of six legs.^{[1]} Pool winners and the best runner-up would qualify for the final four round, joining the host team. If the final four host team finished first in its league round pool, both pool runners-up would qualify for the final four.^{[1]} Spain and Portugal won pool A and B, respectively, and Romania and Turkey qualified as runners-up.

In the final four tournament, the semi-final matches featured Portugal and Spain defeating Romania (3–2) and Turkey (3–0), respectively, to produce a rematch of the 2007 final. Portugal overturned a 1–0 Spanish lead to win 3–1 and secure its first European League title. As winner of the 2010 European League, Portugal will compete in the FIVB World League 2011 Qualification tournament.

== Teams ==
- Austria
- Great Britain
- Greece
- Portugal
- Romania
- Slovakia
- Spain
- Turkey

== League round ==
=== Pool A ===
Pos	Team	Pld	W	L	Pts	SW	SL	SR	SPW	SPL	SPR	Qualification
1	Spain (Note: Qualified as hosts) (H)	12	9	3	21	30	17	1.765	1082	997	1.085	Final Four
2	Romania	12	7	5	19	26	23	1.130	1069	1075	0.994	Final Four
3	Slovakia	12	5	7	17	21	24	0.875	1000	1009	0.991	
4	Great Britain	12	3	9	15	15	28	0.536	929	999	0.930	

(H) Host

==== Leg 1 ====
Date	Time		Score		Set 1	Set 2	Set 3	Set 4	Set 5	Total	Report
4 Jun	19:30	Spain	1–3	Romania	18–25	25–21	21–25	27–29		91–100	Report
5 Jun	18:00	Spain	2–3	Romania	22–25	23–25	25–18	26–24	10–15	106–107	Report
5 Jun	15:00	Great Britain	1–3	Slovakia	23–25	25–19	23–25	23–25		94–94	Report
6 Jun	15:00	Great Britain	3–0	Slovakia	25–23	25–21	25–22			75–66	Report

==== Leg 2 ====
Date	Time		Score		Set 1	Set 2	Set 3	Set 4	Set 5	Total	Report
11 Jun	20:30	Spain	3–1	Great Britain	25–15	18–25	25–23	28–26		96–89	Report
12 Jun	20:30	Spain	0–3	Great Britain	22–25	24–26	22–25			68–76	Report
11 Jun	18:00	Romania	3–0	Slovakia	25–21	25–23	25–18			75–62	Report
12 Jun	18:00	Romania	2–3	Slovakia	27–25	25–18	22–25	15–25	13–15	102–108	Report

==== Leg 3 ====
Date	Time		Score		Set 1	Set 2	Set 3	Set 4	Set 5	Total	Report
19 Jun	18:00	Slovakia	2–3	Spain	25–22	19–25	22–25	25–20	12–15	103–107	Report
20 Jun	18:00	Slovakia	0–3	Spain	24–26	23–25	24–26			71–77	Report
19 Jun	15:00	Great Britain	3–1	Romania	21–25	25–18	25–18	25–16		96–77	Report
20 Jun	15:00	Great Britain	2–3	Romania	25–23	15–25	21–25	25–22	10–15	96–110	Report

==== Leg 4 ====
Date	Time		Score		Set 1	Set 2	Set 3	Set 4	Set 5	Total	Report
26 Jun	20:00	Spain	3–1	Slovakia	25–16	23–25	25–22	25–18		98–81	Report
27 Jun	20:00	Spain	3–2	Slovakia	25–27	22–25	25–21	25–22	15–9	112–104	Report
25 Jun	18:00	Romania	3–0	Great Britain	25–22	25–20	26–24			76–66	Report
26 Jun	18:00	Romania	3–2	Great Britain	22–25	25–21	20–25	30–28	15–13	112–112	Report

==== Leg 5 ====
Date	Time		Score		Set 1	Set 2	Set 3	Set 4	Set 5	Total	Report
3 Jul	18:00	Slovakia	1–3	Romania	21–25	26–24	21–25	18–25		86–99	Report
4 Jul	18:00	Slovakia	3–0	Romania	25–16	25–22	25–18			75–56	Report
3 Jul	15:00	Great Britain	0–3	Spain	23–25	20–25	17–25			60–75	Report
4 Jul	15:00	Great Britain	0–3	Spain	12–25	17–25	22–25			51–75	Report

==== Leg 6 ====
Date	Time		Score		Set 1	Set 2	Set 3	Set 4	Set 5	Total	Report
9 Jul	18:00	Slovakia	3–0	Great Britain	25–15	25–19	25–21			75–55	Report
10 Jul	18:00	Slovakia	3–0	Great Britain	25–15	25–23	25–21			75–59	Report
9 Jul	18:00	Romania	2–3	Spain	25–16	25–21	23–25	19–25	12–15	104–102	Report
10 Jul	18:00	Romania	0–3	Spain	20–25	15–25	16–25			51–75	Report

=== Pool B ===
Pos	Team	Pld	W	L	Pts	SW	SL	SR	SPW	SPL	SPR	Qualification
1	Portugal	12	11	1	23	34	12	2.833	1111	993	1.119	Final Four
2	Turkey	12	6	6	18	21	21	1.000	1001	1019	0.982	Final Four
3	Greece	12	5	7	17	24	23	1.043	1072	1047	1.024	
4	Austria	12	2	10	14	10	33	0.303	926	1051	0.881	

==== Leg 1 ====
Date	Time		Score		Set 1	Set 2	Set 3	Set 4	Set 5	Total	Report
5 Jun	18:00	Turkey	1–3	Portugal	34–32	21–25	23–25	26–28		104–110	Report
6 Jun	18:00	Turkey	0–3	Portugal	27–29	21–25	20–25			68–79	Report
4 Jun	19:30	Austria	3–2	Greece	18–25	26–24	22–25	25–17	15–11	106–102	Report
5 Jun	20:15	Austria	0–3	Greece	19–25	23–25	17–25			59–75	Report

==== Leg 2 ====
Date	Time		Score		Set 1	Set 2	Set 3	Set 4	Set 5	Total	Report
12 Jun	17:00	Portugal	3–2	Greece	24–26	27–25	25–15	21–25	15–11	112–102	Report
13 Jun	17:00	Portugal	3–2	Greece	25–19	25–21	15–25	19–25	15–9	99–99	Report
12 Jun	18:00	Turkey	3–0	Austria	25–22	25–19	25–17			75–58	Report
13 Jun	18:00	Turkey	3–1	Austria	25–18	23–25	25–18	26–24		99–85	Report

==== Leg 3 ====
Date	Time		Score		Set 1	Set 2	Set 3	Set 4	Set 5	Total	Report
18 Jun	20:15	Austria	0–3	Portugal	21–25	19–25	14–25			54–75	Report
19 Jun	19:00	Austria	1–3	Portugal	22–25	25–20	15–25	17–25		79–95	Report
18 Jun	20:00	Greece	0–3	Turkey	23–25	23–25	22–25			68–75	Report
19 Jun	20:00	Greece	3–0	Turkey	25–22	25–19	25–23			75–64	Report

==== Leg 4 ====
Date	Time		Score		Set 1	Set 2	Set 3	Set 4	Set 5	Total	Report
26 Jun	17:00	Portugal	3–0	Austria	25–23	28–26	25–16			78–65	Report
27 Jun	17:00	Portugal	3–1	Austria	25–20	25–23	20–25	25–22		95–90	Report
26 Jun	17:00	Turkey	3–1	Greece	25–19	22–25	25–22	25–23		97–89	Report
27 Jun	15:00	Turkey	3–1	Greece	27–25	25–22	20–25	25–23		97–95	Report

==== Leg 5 ====
Date	Time		Score		Set 1	Set 2	Set 3	Set 4	Set 5	Total	Report
3 Jul	20:30	Greece	1–3	Portugal	13–25	25–18	19–25	29–31		86–99	Report
4 Jul	20:30	Greece	3–1	Portugal	25–16	25–15	23–25	30–28		103–84	Report
2 Jul	20:15	Austria	0–3	Turkey	20–25	29–31	26–28			75–84	Report
3 Jul	18:00	Austria	3–1	Turkey	26–24	23–25	26–24	25–22		100–95	Report

==== Leg 6 ====
Date	Time		Score		Set 1	Set 2	Set 3	Set 4	Set 5	Total	Report
10 Jul	16:00	Portugal	3–0	Turkey	25–17	25–23	25–9			75–49	Report
11 Jul	16:00	Portugal	3–1	Turkey	25–19	22–25	25–14	38–36		110–94	Report
9 Jul	20:00	Greece	3–1	Austria	28–26	25–18	23–25	25–19		101–88	Report
10 Jul	20:00	Greece	3–0	Austria	25–23	25–19	27–25			77–67	Report

== Final four ==
The final four tournament was held at the Polideportivo Aguas Vivas sports hall in Guadalajara, Spain, on July 16 and July 17, 2010.

Semi-finals
July 16 – Guadalajara
Romania	2
Portugal	3
July 16 – Guadalajara
Spain	3
Turkey	0

Final
July 17 – Guadalajara
Portugal	3
Spain	1
3rd place
July 17 – Guadalajara
Romania	2
Turkey	3

=== Semifinals ===
Date	Time		Score		Set 1	Set 2	Set 3	Set 4	Set 5	Total	Report
16 Jul	17:00	Romania	2–3	Portugal	15–25	15–25	25–23	25–19	8–15	88–107	Report
16 Jul	20:00	Spain	3–0	Turkey	25–21	25–20	25–22			75–63	Report

=== Bronze medal match ===
Date	Time		Score		Set 1	Set 2	Set 3	Set 4	Set 5	Total	Report
17 Jul	17:00	Romania	2–3	Turkey	19–25	25–22	25–17	16–25	13–15	98–104	Report

=== Final ===
Date	Time		Score		Set 1	Set 2	Set 3	Set 4	Set 5	Total	Report
17 Jul	20:00	Portugal	3–1	Spain	23–25	25–23	25–18	25–21		98–87	Report

== Final standing ==
Rank	Team
1st place, gold medalist(s)	Portugal
2nd place, silver medalist(s)	Spain
3rd place, bronze medalist(s)	Turkey
4	Romania
5	Greece
6	Slovakia
7	Great Britain
8	Austria

2010 European League champions

Portugal
1st title

14-man Roster for Final Round
Carlos Teixeira, Manuel Silva, João Malveiro, Marco Ferreira, Tiago Violas, Carlos Fidalgo, Frederico Siqueira, João José, Valdir Sequeira, Flávio Cruz, Rui Antonio Santos, João Fidalgo, André Lopes, Alexandre Ferreira
Head coach
Juan Díaz

== Awards ==
- Most valuable player
  (Portugal) Valdir Sequeira
- Best scorer
  (Turkey) Serhat Coskun
- Best spiker
  (Portugal) João José
- Best blocker
  (Portugal) João Malveiro
- Best server
  (Spain) Jose Subiela
- Best setter
  (Spain) Guillermo Hérnan
- Best receiver
  (Portugal) André Lopes
- Best libero
  (Spain) Francesc Llenas
