= Roberto Reis =

Portuguese volleyball player (born 1980)

Personal information
- Full name: Roberto Mauro Silva Reis
- Nationality: Portuguese
- Born: 2 March 1980 (age 46); Esmoriz, Portugal
- Height: 1.90 m (6 ft 3 in)
- Weight: 82 kg (181 lb)
- Spike: 335 cm (132 in)
- Block: 325 cm (128 in)

Volleyball information
- Position: Outside hitter
- Current club: Sporting

Career
Years	Teams
1998–2005; 2005; 2005–2010; 2010–2011; 2011–2017; 2017–2018; 2018-2019; 2019-	Esmoriz GC; Crema Volley; Espinho; Vitória Guimarães; Benfica; Espinho; Sporting; Esmoriz GC

National team
2000–2004; 2006–2008	Portugal

Roberto Mauro Silva Reis (born 2 March 1980) is a Portuguese volleyball player who plays for Sporting and the Portugal national team.

Reis also competes in Beach Volleyball, together with Kibinho, winning the national championship in 2010, 2011, 2012 and 2014.

== Career ==
Born in Esmoriz, Reis started his professional career as an 18-year-old in his hometown club, Esmoriz Ginásio Clube, which led him to his debut for the national team against Czech Republic in 2000.

After a brief spell in the Italian Volleyball League, he moved to Sporting de Espinho, taking part in the conquest of four national titles and one cup. In 2009, he signed with Vitória de Guimarães, but stayed just one year, as he joined Benfica, helping them win an historic three-peat, plus two cups. In 2017, he was released by Benfica and returned to Sporting de Espinho. A year later, he went back to Lisbon to play for Sporting.

In international level, Reis competed at 2008 Olympic Qualification Tournament in Espinho, where Portugal ended up in second place and missed qualification for the 2008 Summer Olympics in Beijing, China.

== Honours ==
Sporting Espinho

- Portuguese First Division: 2005–06, 2006–07, 2008–09, 2009–10
- Portuguese Volleyball Cup: 2007–08

Benfica

- Portuguese First Division: 2012–13, 2013–14, 2014–15, 2016–17
- Portuguese Volleyball Cup: 2011–12, 2014–15
- Portuguese Volleyball Super Cup (6): 2011, 2012, 2013, 2014, 2015, 2016

Portugal

- 2002 World Championship – 8th place
- 2008 Olympic Qualification Tournament – 2nd place (did not qualify)
