= Nuno Pinheiro =

Portuguese volleyball player (born 1984)

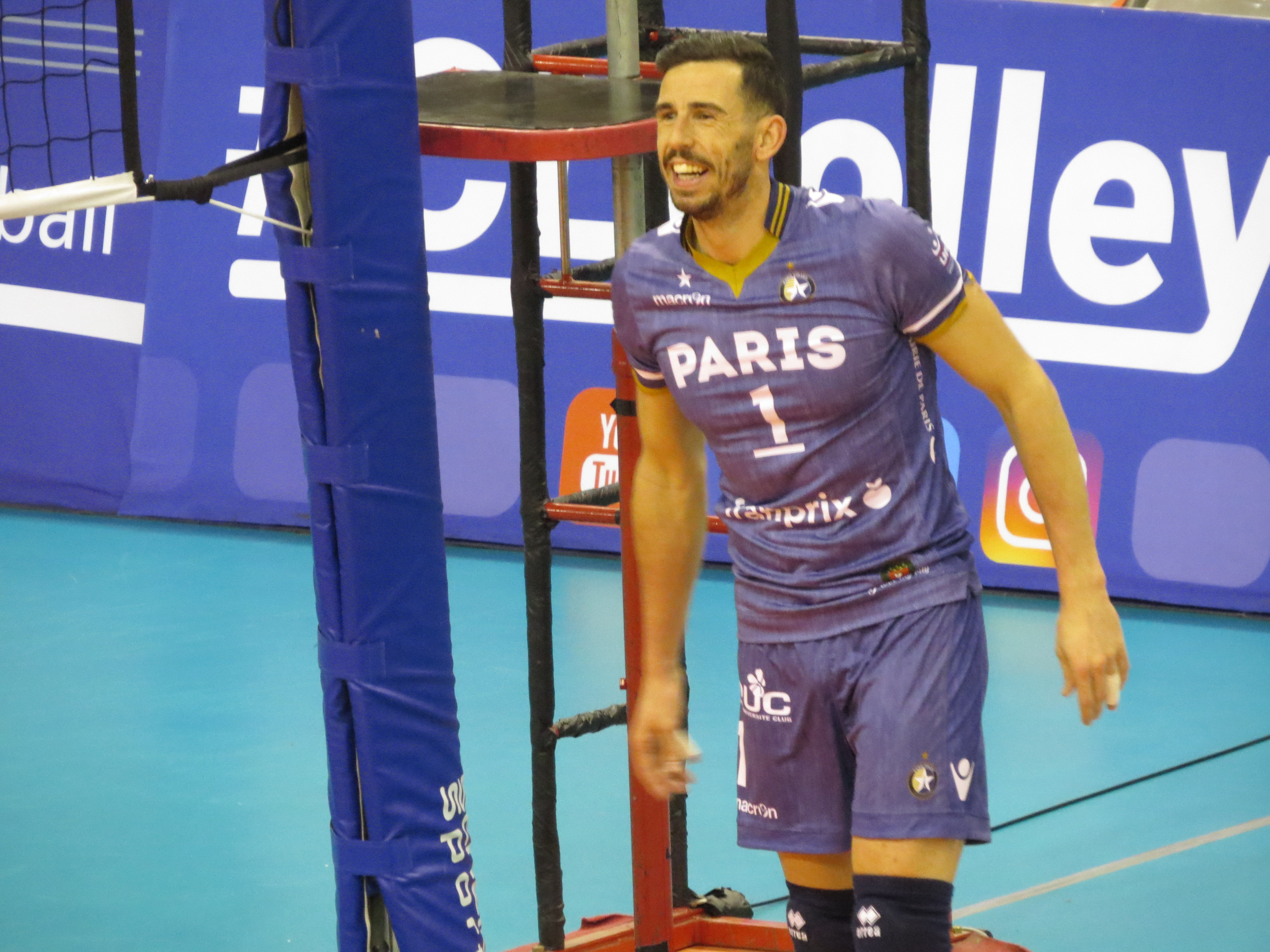
- Pinheiro with Paris Volley in 2017

Personal information
- Full name: Nuno Miguel Araújo Pinheiro
- Nationality: Portuguese
- Born: 31 December 1984 (age 41); Espinho, Portugal
- Height: 193 cm (6 ft 4 in)
- Weight: 89 kg (196 lb)
- Spike: 337 cm (133 in)
- Block: 325 cm (128 in)

Volleyball information
- Position: Setter
- Current club: Benfica
- Number: 9 (national team)

Career
Years	Teams
–2004	Vitória Guimarães
2004–2005	Prisma Volley
2005–2009	Noliko Maaseik
2009–	Beauvais Oise UC
–	Stade Poitevin Poitiers
–	Tours VB
–2018	Paris Volley
2018–	Benfica

National team
2002–2015	Portugal

Nuno Miguel Araújo Pinheiro (born 31 December 1984 in Espinho) is a professional volleyballer who plays for S.L. Benfica as a setter.

Pinheiro was recruited to the Portugal men's national team in May 2002 and represented the country until 2015. In 2005, he played for Portugal at the World Cup qualifying tournament in Varna and in the European Championships in Italy.

Between 2005 and July 2009, Pinheiro played for Noliko Maaseik in Belgium, with whom he won two championships, one Cup and two Super Cups.

Pinheiro became Best Setter at the second 2008 Olympic Qualification Tournament in Espinho, where Portugal ended up in second place and missed qualification for the 2008 Summer Olympics in Beijing, China.

== Honours ==
Benfica

- Portuguese First Division: 2018–19
- Portuguese Cup: 2018–19
- Portuguese Super Cup: 2018, 2019
