= Hugo Gaspar =

Portuguese volleyball player (born 1982)

Personal information
- Full name: Hugo Fernando Lucas Gaspar
- Nationality: Portuguese
- Born: 2 September 1982 (age 44) Marinha Grande, Portugal
- Height: 2.01 m (6 ft 7 in)
- Weight: 83 kg (183 lb)
- Spike: 354 cm (139 in)
- Block: 343 cm (135 in)

Volleyball information
- Position: Outside hitter
- Current club: Benfica
- Number: 8

Career
- Years: Team
- 1998–2000 2000–2004 2004–2005 2005–2009 2009–2010 2010–2024: Sport Operário Marinhense; Esmoriz GC; Sisley Treviso; Vitória Guimarães; Castelo da Maia; Benfica

National team
- Years: Team
- 2002–2021: Portugal

Hugo Fernando Lucas Gaspar (born 2 September 1982) is a former Portuguese volleyball player who played for Benfica and the Portugal national team. He became the Best Scorer at the second 2008 Olympic Qualification Tournament in Espinho, where Portugal ended up in second place and missed qualification for the 2008 Summer Olympics in Beijing, China.

== Honours ==
Sisley Treviso

- Italian Volleyball League: 2004–05

Vitória Guimarães

- Portuguese First Division: 2007–08
- Portuguese Cup: 2008–09

Castelo da Maia

- Portuguese Cup: 2009–10

Benfica

- Portuguese First Division (9): 2012–13, 2013–14, 2014–15, 2016–17, 2018–19, 2020–21, 2021–22, 2022–23, 2023–24
- Portuguese Cup (8): 2010–11, 2011–12, 2014–15, 2015–16, 2017–18, 2018–19, 2021–22, 2022–23
- Portuguese Super Cup (11): 2011, 2012, 2013, 2014, 2015, 2016, 2018, 2019, 2020, 2021, 2023

Portugal

- 2002 World Championship – 8th place
- 2008 Olympic Qualification Tournament – 2nd place (did not qualify)
