= Afonso Guerreiro =

Portuguese volleyball player (born 1994)

Personal information
- Nationality: Portuguese
- Born: 28 December 1994 (age 31)
- Height: 197 cm (6 ft 6 in)
- Weight: 70 kg (154 lb)
- Spike: 319 cm (126 in)
- Block: 300 cm (118 in)

Volleyball information
- Position: Outside hitter
- Current club: Benfica
- Number: 25 (national team)

Career
Years	Teams
2015	CV Oeiras

National team
2015	Portugal

Afonso Guerreiro (born 28 December 1994) is a Portuguese male volleyball player for S.L. Benfica and the Portugal men's national volleyball team.

== Honours ==
Benfica

- Portuguese First Division: 2012–13
- Portuguese Super Cup: 2019
