= 2014–15 CEV Challenge Cup =

- League: CEV Challenge Cup
- Sport: Volleyball
- Duration: 4 November 2014 – 12 April 2015

Finals
- Champions: (Serbia) Vojvodina NS Seme Novi Sad
- Runners-up: (Portugal) S.L. Benfica
- Finals MVP: (Brazil) Flávio Soares (LIS)

CEV Challenge Cup seasons
- ← 2013–14 2015–16 →

The 2014–15 CEV Challenge Cup was the 35th edition of the CEV Challenge Cup tournament, the former CEV Cup.

Serbian club Vojvodina NS Seme Novi Sad beat Portuguese S.L. Benfica in the finale and achieved first CEV Challenge Cup trophy. Brazilian player Flávio Soares from runner-up club was the Most Valuable Player of the final tournament.

== Participating teams ==
| Country | Number of teams | Teams |
|---|---|---|
| Austria | 3 | TSV Volksbank Hartberg, Union Raiffeisen Waldviertel, UVC Holding Graz |
| Cyprus | 2 | Anorthosis Famagusta, Omonoia Nicosia |
| Netherlands | 2 | Abiant Lycurgus, Rivo Rijssen |
| Portugal | 2 | S.L. Benfica, Fonte Bastardo |
| Slovakia | 2 | Chemes Humenné, Spartak Myjava |
| Switzerland | 2 | Lausanne UC, TV Schönenwerd |
| Turkey | 2 | Galatasaray FXTCR Istanbul, Maliye Milli Piyango Ankara |
| Albania | 1 | Studenti Tirana |
| Andorra | 1 | CV Andorra |
| Belarus | 1 | Stroitel Minsk |
| Bulgaria | 1 | CSKA Sofia |
| Estonia | 1 | TTÜ VK Tallinn |
| Finland | 1 | Hurrikaani Loimaa |
| France | 1 | Chaumont VB 52 |
| Greece | 1 | Ethnikos Alexandroupolis |
| Hungary | 1 | Fino Kaposvár SE |
| Israel | 1 | Hapoel Mate-Asher Akko |
| Italy | 1 | CMC Ravenna |
| Latvia | 1 | VK Biolars Jelgava |
| Luxembourg | 1 | VC Strassen |
| Romania | 1 | Unirea DEJ |
| Russia | 1 | Guberniya Nizhniy Novgorod |
| Serbia | 1 | Crvena Zvezda Beograd |

== Qualification phase ==
=== 2nd round ===
- 1st leg 4–6 November 2014
- 2nd leg 18–20 November 2014

| Team 1 | Agg. | Team 2 | 1st leg | 2nd leg |
|---|---|---|---|---|
| CMC Ravenna (Italy) | – | Bye | – | – |
| Anorthosis Famagusta (Cyprus) | 1–6 | (Cyprus) Omonoia Nicosia | 1–3 | 0–3 |
| Fino Kaposvár SE (Hungary) | 6–1 | (Albania) Studenti Tirana | 3–0 | 3–1 |
| Crvena Zvezda Beograd (Serbia) | 5–3 | (Israel) Hapoel Mate-Asher Akko | 3–0 | 2–3 |
| TV Schönenwerd (Switzerland) | 3–4 | (Greece) Ethnikos Alexandroupolis | 3–1 | 0–3 |
| Rivo Rijssen (Netherlands) | 0–6 | (Netherlands) Abiant Lycurgus | 0–3 | 0–3 |
| CV Andorra | 0–6 | (Portugal) S.L. Benfica | w/o | w/o |
| Fonte Bastardo (Portugal) | 5–4 | (France) Chaumont VB 52 | 3–1 | 2–3 |
| Hurrikaani Loimaa (Finland) | 2–6 | (Turkey) Galatasaray FXTCR Istanbul | 2–3 | 0–3 |
| Chemes Humenné (Slovakia) | 5–4 | (Switzerland) Lausanne UC | 2–3 | 3–1 |
| TSV Volksbank Hartberg (Austria) | 3–6 | (Luxembourg) VC Strassen | 2–3 | 1–3 |
| Union Raiffeisen Waldviertel (Austria) | 6–2 | (Austria) UVC Holding Graz | 3–0 | 3–2 |
| Unirea DEJ (Romania) | 6–2 | (Estonia) TTÜ VK Tallinn | 3–1 | 3–1 |
| Spartak Myjava (Slovakia) | 1–6 | (Turkey) Maliye Milli Piyango Ankara | 1–3 | 0–3 |
| Stroitel Minsk (Belarus) | 6–1 | (Bulgaria) CSKA Sofia | 3–0 | 3–1 |
| Guberniya Nizhniy Novgorod (Russia) | 6–0 | (Latvia) VK Biolars Jelgava | 3–0 | 3–0 |

Notes

1. CV Andorra withdrew from the competition.

== Main phase ==
=== 16th finals ===
- 1st leg 2–4 December 2014
- 2nd leg 16–18 December 2014

| Team 1 | Agg. | Team 2 | 1st leg | 2nd leg | Golden Set |
|---|---|---|---|---|---|
| Fino Kaposvár SE (Hungary) | – | Bye | – | – | |
| Bigbank Tartu (Estonia) | 0–6 | (Italy) CMC Ravenna | 0–3 | 0–3 | |
| Omonia Nicosia (Cyprus) | 2–6 | (Czech Republic) VK Dukla Liberec | 1–3 | 1–3 | |
| Loimu Raisio (Finland) | 3–6 | (Serbia) Crvena Zvezda Beograd | 2–3 | 1–3 | |
| Selver Tallinn (Estonia) | 0–6 | (Greece) Ethnikos Alexandroupolis | 0–3 | 0–3 | |
| Fatra Zlín (Czech Republic) | 6–4 | (Netherlands) Abiant Lycurgus | 3–2 | 3–2 | |
| Partizan Vizura Beograd (Serbia) | 2–6 | (Portugal) S.L. Benfica | 1–3 | 1–3 | |
| Volejbal Brno (Czech Republic) | 0–6 | (Portugal) Fonte Bastardo | 0–3 | 0–3 | |
| Galatasaray FXTCR Istanbul (Turkey) | 6–0 | (Bosnia and Herzegovina) MOK Jedinstvo Brčko | 3–0 | 3–0 | |
| MOK Rovinj (Croatia) | 0–6 | (Slovakia) Chemes Humenné | 0–3 | 0–3 | |
| OK Mladost Brčko (Bosnia and Herzegovina) | 6–1 | (Luxembourg) VC Strassen | 3–0 | 3–1 | |
| Vojvodina NS Seme Novi Sad (Serbia) | 6–1 | (Austria) Union Raiffeisen Waldviertel | 3–0 | 3–1 | |
| Dinamo București (Romania) | 3–3 | (Romania) Unirea DEJ | 3–0 | 0–3 | 15–9 |
| Maliye Milli Piyango Ankara (Turkey) | 6–0 | (Switzerland) Biogas Volley Näfels | 3–0 | 3–0 | |
| Tiikerit Kokkola (Finland) | 4–5 | (Belarus) Stroitel Minsk | 3–2 | 1–3 | |
| Guberniya Nizhniy Novgorod (Russia) | 6–0 | (Bulgaria) CVC Gabrovo | w/o | w/o | |

Notes

1. CVC Gabrovo withdrew from the competition.

=== 8th finals ===
- 1st leg 13–15 January 2015
- 2nd leg 20–21 January 2015

| Team 1 | Agg. | Team 2 | 1st leg | 2nd leg |
|---|---|---|---|---|
| VK Dukla Liberec (Czech Republic) | 2–6 | (Italy) CMC Ravenna | 2–3 | 0–3 |
| Fino Kaposvár SE (Hungary) | 3–6 | (Serbia) Crvena Zvezda Beograd | 1–3 | 2–3 |
| Fatra Zlín (Czech Republic) | 0–6 | (Greece) Ethnikos Alexandroupolis | 0–3 | 0–3 |
| S.L. Benfica (Portugal) | 6–2 | (Portugal) Fonte Bastardo | 3–2 | 3–0 |
| Galatasaray FXTCR Istanbul (Turkey) | 6–2 | (Slovakia) Chemes Humenné | 3–0 | 3–2 |
| OK Mladost Brčko (Bosnia and Herzegovina) | 3–5 | (Serbia) Vojvodina NS Seme Novi Sad | 3–2 | 0–3 |
| Dinamo București (Romania) | 2–6 | (Turkey) Maliye Milli Piyango Ankara | 2–3 | 0–3 |
| Stroitel Minsk (Belarus) | 5–4 | (Russia) Guberniya Nizhniy Novgorod | 3–1 | 2–3 |

=== 4th finals ===
- 1st leg 3–5 March 2015
- 2nd leg 10–12 March 2015

| Team 1 | Agg. | Team 2 | 1st leg | 2nd leg | Golden Set |
|---|---|---|---|---|---|
| Crvena Zvezda Beograd (Serbia) | 3–5 | (Italy) CMC Ravenna | 3–2 | 0–3 | |
| S.L. Benfica (Portugal) | 6–2 | (Greece) Ethnikos Alexandroupolis | 3–0 | 3–2 | |
| Galatasaray FXTCR Istanbul (Turkey) | 3–4 | (Serbia) Vojvodina NS Seme Novi Sad | 3–1 | 0–3 | 11–15 |
| Maliye Milli Piyango Ankara (Turkey) | 4–3 | (Belarus) Stroitel Minsk | 3–0 | 1–3 | 11–15 |

== Final phase ==
=== Semi-finals ===
| Team 1 | Agg. | Team 2 | 1st leg | 2nd leg |
|---|---|---|---|---|
| S.L. Benfica (Portugal) | 6–2 | (Italy) CMC Ravenna | 3–0 | 3–2 |
| Stroitel Minsk (Belarus) | 3–6 | (Serbia) Vojvodina NS Seme Novi Sad | 1–3 | 2–3 |

==== First leg ====
| Date | Time | | Score | | Set 1 | Set 2 | Set 3 | Set 4 | Set 5 | Total | Report |
|---|---|---|---|---|---|---|---|---|---|---|---|
| 25 Mar | 20:30 | S.L. Benfica (Portugal) | 3–0 | (Italy) CMC Ravenna | 25–20 | 26–24 | 25–19 | | | 76–63 | Report |
| 25 Mar | 19:00 | Stroitel Minsk (Belarus) | 1–3 | (Serbia) Vojvodina NS Seme Novi Sad | 22–25 | 25–22 | 20–25 | 18–25 | | 85–97 | Report |

==== Second leg ====
| Date | Time | | Score | | Set 1 | Set 2 | Set 3 | Set 4 | Set 5 | Total | Report |
|---|---|---|---|---|---|---|---|---|---|---|---|
| 29 Mar | 18:00 | CMC Ravenna (Italy) | 2–3 | (Portugal) S.L. Benfica | 25–23 | 27–25 | 20–25 | 18–25 | 10–15 | 100–113 | Report |
| 29 Mar | 18:00 | Vojvodina NS Seme Novi Sad (Serbia) | 3–2 | (Belarus) Stroitel Minsk | 23–25 | 24–26 | 25–22 | 25–15 | 15–10 | 112–98 | Report |

=== Final ===
==== First leg ====
| Date | Time | | Score | | Set 1 | Set 2 | Set 3 | Set 4 | Set 5 | Total | Report |
|---|---|---|---|---|---|---|---|---|---|---|---|
| 8 Apr | 18:00 | Vojvodina NS Seme Novi Sad (Serbia) | 3–1 | (Portugal) S.L. Benfica | 25–19 | 25–23 | 22–25 | 25–22 | | 97–89 | Report |

==== Second leg ====
| Date | Time | | Score | | Set 1 | Set 2 | Set 3 | Set 4 | Set 5 | Total | Report |
|---|---|---|---|---|---|---|---|---|---|---|---|
| 12 Apr | 17:00 | S.L. Benfica (Portugal) | 3–2 | (Serbia) Vojvodina NS Seme Novi Sad | 24–26 | 21–25 | 25–16 | 25–23 | 15–10 | 110–100 | Report |

== Final standing ==
| Rank | Team |
|---|---|
| 1st place, gold medalist(s) | (Serbia) Vojvodina NS Seme Novi Sad |
| 2nd place, silver medalist(s) | (Portugal) S.L. Benfica |
| Semifinalists | (Belarus) Stroitel Minsk |
| Semifinalists | (Italy) CMC Ravenna |

2015 Men's CEV Challenge Cup winner
(Serbia)
Vojvodina NS Seme Novi Sad
1st title

Stevan Simić, Lazar Kolarić, Cedomir Stanković, Borislav Petrović, Miloš Nadazdin, Milan Katić, Igor Jovanović, Nikola Peković, Veljko Petković, Dražen Luburić, Mihajlo Stanković, Miodrag Milutinov
Head coach
Strahinja Kozić
