= Ivo Casas =

Portuguese volleyball player (born 1992)

Personal information
- Full name: Ivo Manuel Correia Casas
- Nationality: Portuguese
- Born: 21 September 1992 (age 34)
- Height: 180 cm (5 ft 11 in)
- Weight: 76 kg (168 lb)
- Spike: 290 cm (114 in)
- Block: 278 cm (109 in)

Volleyball information
- Current club: S.L. Benfica
- Number: 7

Career
- Years: Team
- 2014–: S.L. Benfica

National team
- Years: Team
- 2015: Portugal

Ivo Manuel Correia Casas (born 21 September 1992) is a Portuguese volleyball player who plays for S.L. Benfica and the Portugal men's national team.

== Honours ==
Benfica

- Portuguese First Division (7): 2014–15, 2016–17, 2018–19, 2020–21, 2021–22, 2022–23, 2023–24
- Portuguese Cup (7): 2014–15, 2015–16, 2017–18, 2018–19, 2021–22, 2022–23, 2024–25
- Portuguese Super Cup (8): 2014, 2015, 2016, 2018, 2019, 2020, 2021, 2023
