= André Lopes (volleyball) =

Portuguese volleyball player (born 1982)

Personal information
- Full name: André Reis Lopes
- Nationality: Portuguese
- Born: 12 September 1982 (age 44); Seia, Portugal
- Height: 1.93 m (6 ft 4 in)
- Weight: 86 kg (190 lb)
- Spike: 342 cm (135 in)
- Block: 332 cm (131 in)

Volleyball information
- Position: Middle hitter
- Current club: Benfica
- Number: 3

Career
Years	Teams
2002–2003; 2004-2008; 2008-2010; 2010-2012; 2012-2013; 2013-2014; 2014-	Ass. Academica de Coimbra; Benfica; Noliko Maaseik; Stade Poitevin Poitiers; Chaumont Volley-Ball 52; AS Cannes; Benfica

National team
2014–	Portugal

André Reis Lopes (born 12 September 1982) is a Portuguese volleyball player who plays for S.L. Benfica and the Portugal national team.

== Honours ==
Benfica

- Portuguese First Division: 2004–05, 2014–15, 2016–17, 2018–19
- Portuguese Cup: 2004–05, 2005–06, 2006–07, 2014–15, 2015–16, 2017–18, 2018–19
- Portuguese Super Cup: 2014, 2015, 2016, 2018, 2019
