= Miguel Tavares (volleyball) =

Portuguese volleyball player (born 1993)

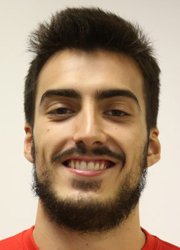

Personal information
- Full name: Miguel Tavares Rodrigues
- Born: 2 March 1993 (age 33); Amadora, Portugal
- Height: 1.92 m (6 ft 4 in)
- Weight: 68 kg (150 lb)
- Spike: 334 cm (131 in)

Volleyball information
- Position: Setter
- Current club: Warta Zawiercie
- Number: 15

Career
Years	Teams
2010–2014; 2014–2016; 2016–2018; 2018–2019; 2019–2021; 2021–	Benfica; Volley Piacenza; Tourcoing LM; Rennes Volley 35; Cuprum Lubin; Warta Zawiercie

National team
Portugal
Honours
Men's volleyball
Representing Portugal
FIVB Challenger Cup
Gold medal – first place	2018 Matosinhos

Miguel Tavares Rodrigues (born 2 March 1993) is a Portuguese professional volleyball player who plays as a setter for Aluron CMC Warta Zawiercie and the Portugal national team.

== Honours ==
=== Club ===
- CEV Champions League
  - 2024–25 – with Aluron CMC Warta Zawiercie
  - 2025–26 – with Aluron CMC Warta Zawiercie
- Domestic
  - 2010–11 Portuguese Cup, with Benfica
  - 2011–12 Portuguese SuperCup, with Benfica
  - 2011–12 Portuguese Cup, with Benfica
  - 2012–13 Portuguese SuperCup, with Benfica
  - 2012–13 Portuguese Championship, with Benfica
  - 2013–14 Portuguese SuperCup, with Benfica
  - 2013–14 Portuguese Championship, with Benfica
  - 2017–18 French Cup, with Tourcoing LM
  - 2023–24 Polish Cup, with Aluron CMC Warta Zawiercie
  - 2024–25 Polish SuperCup, with Aluron CMC Warta Zawiercie
  - 2025–26 Polish Championship, with Aluron CMC Warta Zawiercie

=== Individual awards ===
- 2018: French Championship – Best setter
- 2019: French Championship – Best setter
