= Daniel McDonnell =

American volleyball player (born 1988)

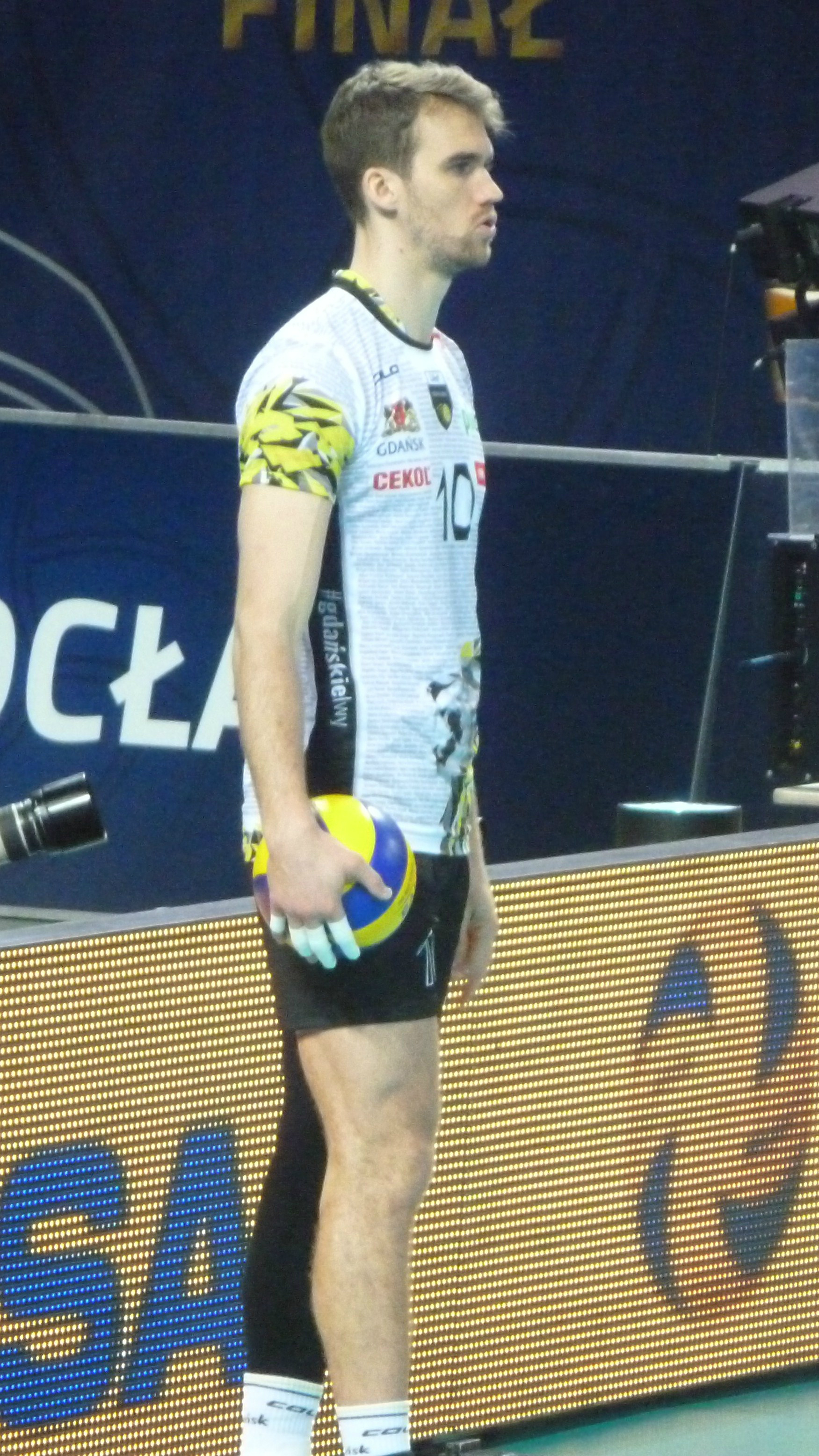

Personal information
- Full name: Daniel James McDonnell
- Nickname: Dan
- Born: September 15, 1988 (age 38); Glendale, Arizona, U.S.
- Height: 6 ft 7 in (2.00 m)
- Weight: 198 lb (90 kg)
- Spike: 140 in (355 cm)
- Block: 126 in (320 cm)
- Education: University of California

Volleyball information
- Position: Middle blocker
- Current club: Arkas İzmir
- Number: 10

Career
Years	Teams
2008–2012; 2012–2013; 2013–2014; 2014–2015; 2016–2017; 2017–2018; 2018–2019; 2020–2021; 2021–2023; 2023-	UC Irvine Anteaters; Raision Loimu; Vôlei Taubaté; Tours VB; Chaumont VB 52; Trefl Gdańsk; Tourcoing LM; Chaumont VB 52; Arkas İzmir; Chaumont Volley-Ball 52

National team
2009–	United States
Medal record
Men's volleyball
Representing United States
FIVB World Championship
Bronze medal – third place	2018 Italy/Bulgaria
FIVB Nations League
Bronze medal – third place	2018 Lille
Pan American Cup
Gold medal – first place	2012 Santo Domingo
NORCECA Championship
Gold medal – first place	2017 United States

Daniel James McDonnell (born September 15, 1988) is an American professional volleyball player. A bronze medalist at the 2018 World Championship. At the professional club level, he plays for Arkas İzmir.

== Honors ==
=== Clubs ===
- CEV Challenge Cup
  - 2016/2017 – with Chaumont VB 52
- National championships
  - 2014/2015 French SuperCup, with Tours VB
  - 2014/2015 French Cup, with Tours VB
  - 2014/2015 French Championship, with Tours VB
  - 2016/2017 French Championship, with Chaumont VB 52
  - 2017/2018 Polish Cup, with Trefl Gdańsk
  - 2021/2022 Turkish Cup, with Arkas İzmir
