= 2017–18 CEV Challenge Cup =

- League: CEV Challenge Cup
- Sport: Volleyball
- Duration: 21 November 2017 – 11 April 2018

Finals
- Champions: (Italy) Bunge Ravenna
- Runners-up: (Greece) Olympiacos Piraeus
- Finals MVP: (Austria) Paul Buchegger (RAV)

CEV Challenge Cup seasons
- ← 2016–17 2018–19 →

The 2017–18 CEV Challenge Cup was the 38th edition of the CEV Challenge Cup tournament, the former CEV Cup.

== Participating teams ==
Rank	Country	Number of teams	Teams
1	Russia	1	Gazprom-Ugra Surgut
2	Italy	1	Bunge Ravenna
3	Turkey	2	Maliye Piyango SK Ankara, İnegöl Belediye Bursa
5	France	1	Tours VB
6	Belgium	1	PAR-KY Menen
8	Greece	2	Foinikas Syros, Olympiacos Piraeus
9	Romania	3	CSA Steaua București, Tricolorul LMV Ploiești, ACS Volei Municipal Zalău
10	Switzerland	3	Biogas Volley Näfels, Lausanne UC, Volley Schönenwerd
11	Czech Republic	2	ČEZ Karlovarsko, Volejbal Brno
13	Austria	2	Union Raiffeisen Waldviertel, UVC Holding Graz
14	Bulgaria	2	Levski Sofia, Montana Volley
19	Estonia	1	Pärnu VK
20	Portugal	2	Fonte Bastardo Açores, S.L. Benfica
21	Belarus	1	Stroitel Minsk
22	Ukraine	1	Lokomotyv Kharkiv
23	Netherlands	1	Orion Doetinchem
24	Slovakia	3	VK KDS ŠPORT Košice, VK Bystrina SPU Nitra, Spartak Myjava
25	Croatia	2	Mladost Zagreb, OK Mladost Ribola Kaštela
26	Hungary	2	Pénzügyőr Budapest, Fino Kaposvár
27	Cyprus	3	Pafiakos Pafos, Nea Salamina Famagusta, APOEL Nicosia
29	Israel	1	Hapoel Kfar Saba
30	Luxembourg	1	VC Strassen
31	Denmark	1	Gentofte Volley
34	Norway	3	TIF Viking Bergen, BK Tromsø, Førde VBK
39	Azerbaijan	1	Lokomotiv Baku

== Qualification phase ==
=== 2nd round ===
- 1st leg 21–23 November 2017
- 2nd leg 28–30 November 2017

Team 1	Agg.	Team 2	1st leg	2nd leg	Golden Set
İnegöl Belediye Bursa (Turkey)	3–3	(Greece) Olympiacos Piraeus	0–3	3–1	13–15
Lausanne UC (Switzerland)	4–2	(Romania) Tricolorul LMV Ploiești	3–0	2–3	
S.L. Benfica (Portugal)	5–1	(Romania) ACS Volei Municipal Zalău	3–1	3–2	
VC Strassen (Luxembourg)	0–6	(Bulgaria) Levski Sofia	1–3	0–3	
Hapoel Kfar Saba (Israel)	6–0	(Cyprus) Nea Salamina Famagusta	3–0	3–1	
Lokomotiv Baku (Azerbaijan)	3–3	(Cyprus) APOEL Nicosia	3–0	1–3	15–11
OK Mladost Ribola Kaštela (Croatia)	0–6	(Czech Republic) Volejbal Brno	0–3	1–3	
Spartak Myjava (Slovakia)	3–3	(Austria) Union Raiffeisen Waldviertel	3–1	0–3	13–15
Fino Kaposvár (Hungary)	1–5	(Slovakia) VK Bystrina SPU Nitra	2–3	0–3	
BK Tromsø (Norway)	0–6	(Denmark) Gentofte Volley	0–3	0–3	
TIF Viking Bergen (Norway)	4–2	(Norway) Førde VBK	2–3	3–1	

== Main phase ==
=== 16th finals ===
- 1st leg 5–7 December 2017
- 2nd leg 19–21 December 2017

Team 1	Agg.	Team 2	1st leg	2nd leg	Golden Set
Pénzügyőr Budapest (Hungary)	0–6	(Russia) Gazprom-Ugra Surgut	0–3	0–3	
Levski Sofia (Bulgaria)	3–3	(Netherlands) Orion Doetinchem	3–1	0–3	13–15
Mladost Zagreb (Croatia)	1–5	(Czech Republic) ČEZ Karlovarsko	2–3	0–3	
Union Raiffeisen Waldviertel (Austria)	0–6	(Switzerland) Biogas Volley Näfels	1–3	1–3	
Volley Schönenwerd (Switzerland)	0–6	(Belgium) PAR-KY Menen	0–3	1–3	
Pafiakos Pafos (Cyprus)	0–6	(Estonia) Pärnu VK	1–3	0–3	
Lokomotiv Baku (Azerbaijan)	3–3	(Portugal) Fonte Bastardo Açores	3–1	0–3	25–23
Olympiacos Piraeus (Greece)	3–3	(France) Tours VB	3–0	0–3	15–11
VK Bystrina SPU Nitra (Slovakia)	0–6	(Turkey) Maliye Piyango SK Ankara	1–3	0–3	
Lausanne UC (Switzerland)	2–4	(Belarus) Stroitel Minsk	3–2	0–3	
Hapoel Kfar Saba (Israel)	1–5	(Bulgaria) Montana Volley	1–3	2–3	
TIF Viking Bergen (Norway)	1–5	(Greece) Foinikas Syros	0–3	2–3	
VK KDS ŠPORT Košice (Slovakia)	0–6	(Romania) CSA Steaua București	0–3	0–3	
S.L. Benfica (Portugal)	6–0	(Austria) UVC Holding Graz	3–0	3–0	
Volejbal Brno (Czech Republic)	3–3	(Ukraine) Lokomotyv Kharkiv	3–0	1–3	15–12
Gentofte Volley (Denmark)	1–5	(Italy) Bunge Ravenna	0–3	2–3	

=== 8th finals ===
- 1st leg 16–18 January 2018
- 2nd leg 30 January – 1 February 2018

Team 1	Agg.	Team 2	1st leg	2nd leg
Gazprom-Ugra Surgut (Russia)	6–0	(Netherlands) Orion Doetinchem	3–1	3–0
ČEZ Karlovarsko (Czech Republic)	1–5	(Switzerland) Biogas Volley Näfels	1–3	2–3
Pärnu VK (Estonia)	0–6	(Belgium) PAR-KY Menen	1–3	0–3
Olympiacos Piraeus (Greece)	6–0	(Azerbaijan) Lokomotiv Baku	3–0	3–0
Maliye Piyango SK Ankara (Turkey)	5–1	(Belarus) Stroitel Minsk	3–0	3–2
Montana Volley (Bulgaria)	4–2	(Greece) Foinikas Syros	3–1	2–3
CSA Steaua București (Romania)	1–5	(Portugal) S.L. Benfica	2–3	1–3
Bunge Ravenna (Italy)	6–0	(Czech Republic) Volejbal Brno	3–0	3–0

=== 4th finals ===
- 1st leg 13–15 February 2018
- 2nd leg 27 February – 1 March 2018

Team 1	Agg.	Team 2	1st leg	2nd leg
Biogas Volley Näfels (Switzerland)	1–5	(Russia) Gazprom-Ugra Surgut	1–3	2–3
PAR-KY Menen (Belgium)	0–6	(Greece) Olympiacos Piraeus	1–3	0–3
Maliye Piyango SK Ankara (Turkey)	6–0	(Bulgaria) Montana Volley	3–0	3–0
Bunge Ravenna (Italy)	5–1	(Portugal) S.L. Benfica	3–1	3–2

== Final phase ==
=== Semi finals ===
Team 1	Agg.	Team 2	1st leg	2nd leg	Golden Set
Gazprom-Ugra Surgut (Russia)	0–6	(Greece) Olympiacos Piraeus	0–3	0–3	
Bunge Ravenna (Italy)	3–3	(Turkey) Maliye Piyango SK Ankara	0–3	3–1	16–14

==== First leg ====
Date	Time		Score		Set 1	Set 2	Set 3	Set 4	Set 5	Total	Report
14 Mar	19:00	Gazprom-Ugra Surgut (Russia)	0–3	(Greece) Olympiacos Piraeus	21–25	21–25	19–25			61–75	Report
14 Mar	20:00	Bunge Ravenna (Italy)	0–3	(Turkey) Maliye Piyango SK Ankara	21–25	19–25	23–25			63–75	Report

==== Second leg ====
Date	Time		Score		Set 1	Set 2	Set 3	Set 4	Set 5	Total	Report
21 Mar	19:00	Olympiacos Piraeus (Greece)	3–0	(Russia) Gazprom-Ugra Surgut	25–22	25–17	25–21			75–60	Report
21 Mar	18:30	Maliye Piyango SK Ankara (Turkey)	1–3	(Italy) Bunge Ravenna	22–25	25–22	19–25	19–25		85–97	Report
Golden set		Maliye Piyango SK Ankara (Turkey)	14–16	(Italy) Bunge Ravenna							

=== Final ===
==== First leg ====
Date	Time		Score		Set 1	Set 2	Set 3	Set 4	Set 5	Total	Report
4 Apr	00:00	Bunge Ravenna (Italy)	3–1	(Greece) Olympiacos Piraeus	26–24	23–25	25–20	25–23		99–92	Report

==== Second leg ====
Date	Time		Score		Set 1	Set 2	Set 3	Set 4	Set 5	Total	Report
11 Apr	20:30	Olympiacos Piraeus (Greece)	1–3	(Italy) Bunge Ravenna	26–28	25–23	20–25	18–25		89–101	Report

== Final standing ==
Rank	Team
1st place, gold medalist(s)	(Italy) Bunge Ravenna
2nd place, silver medalist(s)	(Greece) Olympiacos Piraeus
Semifinalists	(Russia) Gazprom-Ugra Surgut
Semifinalists	(Turkey) Maliye Piyango SK Ankara

2018 Men's CEV Challenge Cup winner
(Italy)
Bunge Ravenna
2nd title

Tiziano Mazzone, Marco Vitelli, Santiago Orduna, Cristian Poglajen, Giacomo Raffaelli, Matteo Pistolesi, Miguel Gutiérrez, Riccardo Goi, Krasimir Georgiev, Enrico Diamantini, Stefano Marchini, Nicolas Maréchal, Paul Buchegger
Head coach
Fabio Soli
