= Tiago Violas =

Portuguese volleyball player (born 1989)

Personal information
- Full name: Tiago Jorge da Silva Violas
- Nationality: Portuguese
- Born: 27 March 1989 (age 37)
- Home town: Ovar, Portugal
- Height: 194 cm (6 ft 4 in)
- Weight: 82 kg (181 lb)
- Spike: 326 cm (128 in)
- Block: 303 cm (119 in)

Volleyball information
- Current club: S.L. Benfica
- Number: 17

Career
- Years: Team
- 2014–2015: AJ Fonte Bastardo
- 2016–: S.L. Benfica

National team
- Years: Team
- 2011–: Portugal

Tiago Jorge da Silva Violas (born 27 March 1989) is a Portuguese volleyball player who plays for S.L. Benfica and the Portugal national team.

== Honours ==
Benfica

- Portuguese First Division (6): 2015–16, 2016–17, 2018–19, 2021–22, 2022–23, 2023–24
- Portuguese Cup (5): 2017–18, 2018–19, 2021–22, 2022–23, 2024–25
- Portuguese Super Cup (6) : 2016, 2018, 2019, 2020, 2021, 2023
