= Pedro Rangel (volleyball) =

Mexican volleyball player (born 1988)

Personal information
- Nationality: Mexican
- Born: 16 September 1988 (age 38)
- Height: 1.94 m (6 ft 4 in)
- Weight: 78 kg (172 lb)
- Spike: 340 cm (134 in)
- Block: 324 cm (128 in)

Volleyball information
- Number: 10

Career
Years	Teams
2009–2010; 2010–2011; 2012–2013; 2012–2013; 2013–2014; 2014–2015; 2016–2017; 2017–2019; 2019–2020; 2020–2021; 2021–	(Mexico) Tigres UANL (Spain) Palma Voley (France) ASUL Lyon Volley (France) Orange Nassau (Germany) Moerser SC (Mexico) Tigres UANL (Portugal) Fonte do Bastardo (Spain) CAI Teruel (France) Tourcoing Lille Métropole (Cyprus) Omonia Nicosia (Romania) CS Municipal Arcada Galați

National team
2014	Mexico

Pedro Rangel (born 16 September 1988) is a Mexican male volleyball player. He was part of the Mexico men's national volleyball team at the 2014 FIVB Volleyball Men's World Championship in Poland. He played for Moerser SC.

== Clubs ==
- Tigres UANL (2009)
- Palma Voley (2010)
- ASUL Lyon Volley (2012)
- Orange Nassau (2012)
- Moerser SC (2013)
- Tigres UANL (2014)
- Fonte do Bastardo (2016)
- CAI Teruel (2017)
- Tourcoing Lille Métropole (2019)
- Omonia Nicosia (2020)
- CS Municipal Arcada Galați (2021)
