= João Oliveira (volleyball) =

Portuguese volleyball player (born 1995)

Personal information
- Nationality: Portuguese
- Born: 31 July 1995 (age 31)
- Height: 198 cm (6 ft 6 in)
- Weight: 76 kg (168 lb)
- Spike: 330 cm (130 in)
- Block: 318 cm (125 in)

Volleyball information
- Number: 10

Career
Years	Teams
2013–2017	S.L. Benfica

National team
2015	Portugal

João Oliveira (born 31 July 1995) is a Portuguese male volleyball player. He is part of the Portugal men's national volleyball team.
