= Stéphen Boyer =

French volleyball player (born 1996)

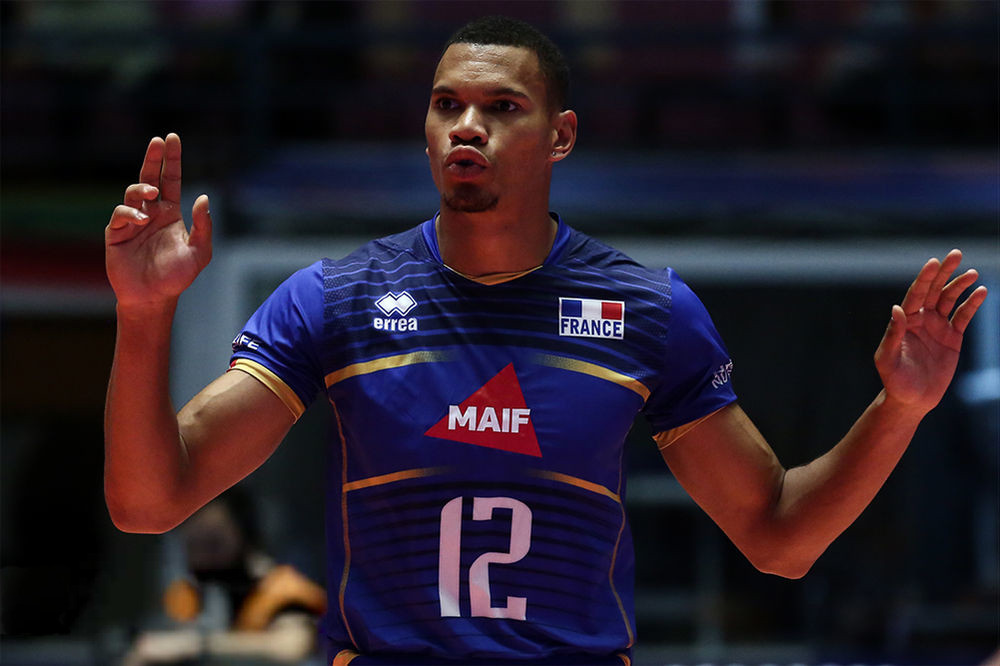
- Boyer in 2019

Personal information
- Full name: Pierre Jean Stéphen Boyer
- Born: 10 April 1996 (age 30); Saint-Denis, Réunion, France
- Height: 1.96 m (6 ft 5 in)
- Weight: 90 kg (198 lb)
- Spike: 355 cm (140 in)
- Block: 334 cm (131 in)

Volleyball information
- Position: Opposite

Career
Years	Teams
2014–2015; 2015–2018; 2018–2020; 2020–2021; 2021; 2021–2023; 2023–2025	GFC Ajaccio VB; Chaumont VB 52; Verona Volley; Al Arabi Doha; Al Rayyan; Jastrzębski Węgiel; Asseco Resovia

National team
2016–	France
Honours
Men's volleyball
Representing (France) France
Olympic Games
Gold medal – first place	2020 Tokyo	Team
FIVB World League
Gold medal – first place	2017 Curitiba
FIVB Nations League
Gold medal – first place	2022 Bologna
Silver medal – second place	2018 Lille
Bronze medal – third place	2021 Rimini
CEV European Championship
Silver medal – second place	2026 Bulgaria/Finland/Italy/Romania

Pierre Jean Stéphen Boyer (born 10 April 1996) is a French professional volleyball player who plays as an opposite for SV.League club JTEKT Stings and the France national team. Boyer won a gold medal in the men's tournament at the Olympic Games Tokyo 2020.

== Career ==
Boyer took part in the 2017 World League and won a gold medal after France beat Brazil in the final.

== Honours ==
=== Club ===
- CEV Champions League
  - 2022–23 – with Jastrzębski Węgiel
- CEV Cup
  - 2023–24 – with Asseco Resovia
  - 2024–25 – with Asseco Resovia
- CEV Challenge Cup
  - 2016–17 – with Chaumont VB 52
- Domestic
  - 2016–17 French Championship, with Chaumont VB 52
  - 2017–18 French SuperCup, with Chaumont VB 52
  - 2020–21 Emir Cup, with Al Rayyan
  - 2021–22 Polish SuperCup, with Jastrzębski Węgiel
  - 2022–23 Polish SuperCup, with Jastrzębski Węgiel
  - 2022–23 Polish Championship, with Jastrzębski Węgiel

=== Individual awards ===
- 2016: French Championship – Best opposite
- 2017: French SuperCup – Most valuable player
- 2018: French Championship – Most valuable player
- 2018: French Championship – Best opposite
- 2024: CEV Cup – Most valuable player

=== Statistics ===
- 2022–23 PlusLiga – Best server (77 aces)
