= Flávio Cruz =

Portuguese volleyball player (born 1982)

Personal information
- Full name: Flávio Rodolfo Gonçalves Cruz
- Nationality: Portuguese
- Born: 28 August 1982 (age 44); Portugal
- Hometown: Senhora da Hora, Portugal
- Height: 195 cm (6 ft 5 in)
- Weight: 86 kg (190 lb)
- Spike: 348 cm (137 in)
- Block: 341 cm (134 in)

Volleyball information
- Current club: Castêlo da Maia

Career
Years	Teams
2010–2015	Benfica

National team
2002–2014	Portugal

Flávio Rodolfo Gonçalves Cruz (born 28 August 1982) is a Portuguese volleyball player who plays for Castêlo da Maia and the Portugal national team. He earn honours as Best Spiker at the second 2008 Olympic Qualification Tournament in Espinho, where Portugal ended up in second place and missed qualification for the 2008 Summer Olympics.

== Honours ==
- 2008 Olympic Qualification Tournament – 2nd place (did not qualify)
