= 2016–17 CEV Challenge Cup =

- League: CEV Challenge Cup
- Sport: Volleyball
- Duration: 8 November 2016 – 16 April 2017

Finals
- Champions: (Russia) Fakel Novy Urengoy
- Runners-up: (France) Chaumont VB 52

CEV Challenge Cup seasons
- ← 2015–16 2017–18 →

The 2016–17 CEV Challenge Cup was the 37th edition of the CEV Challenge Cup tournament, the former CEV Cup.

Russian club Fakel Novy Urengoy beat French team Chaumont VB 52 in both final meetings and achieved first CEV Challenge Cup.

== Participating teams ==
Rank	Country	Number of teams	Teams
1	Russia	1	Fakel Novy Urengoy
3	Turkey	2	Galatasaray HDI Istanbul, Ziraat Bankası Ankara
5	France	1	Chaumont VB 52
9	Romania	2	Tricolorul LMV Ploiești, Volei Municipal Zalău
10	Switzerland	2	Biogas Volley Näfels, Lausanne UC
11	Czech Republic	1	Jihostroj České Budějovice
13	Austria	2	VCA Amstetten Niederösterreich, Union Raiffeisen Waldviertel
17	Slovenia	1	OK SIP Šempeter
20	Portugal	2	S.L. Benfica, Fonte Bastardo Açores
21	Belarus	3	Bate-Bgufk Borisov, Legion Obuhovo, Shakhtyor Soligorsk
23	Netherlands	1	Draisma Dynamo Apeldoorn
24	Slovakia	1	Spartak Myjava
25	Croatia	2	Međimurje Centrometal, Mladost Zagreb
26	Hungary	2	Fino Kaposvár, Vegyész RC Kazincbarcika
27	Cyprus	3	Anorthosis Famagusta, Pokka AE Karava, Pafiakos Pafos
28	Bosnia and Herzegovina	1	MOK Jedinstvo Brcko
29	Israel	1	Maccabi Tel Aviv
30	Luxembourg	1	RSR Walfer Volleyball
32	Albania	1	Studenti Tirana
34	Norway	2	Førde VBK, Viking TIF Bergen
35	Kosovo	1	Kv Luboteni Ferizaj
40	England	1	IBB Polonia London
54	Scotland	1	City of Edinburgh

== Qualification phase ==
=== 2nd round ===
- 1st leg 8–9 November 2016
- 2nd leg 22–24 November 2016

Team 1	Agg.	Team 2	1st leg	2nd leg
Pokka AE Karava (Cyprus)	1–6	(Hungary) Fino Kaposvár	1–3	0–3
Anorthosis Famagusta (Cyprus)	1–6	(Belarus) Legion Obuhovo	1–3	0–3
Førde VBK (Norway)	1–6	(Portugal) Fonte Bastardo Azores	1–3	0–3

== Main phase ==
=== 16th finals ===
- 1st leg 6–14 December 2016
- 2nd leg 20–22 December 2016

Team 1	Agg.	Team 2	1st leg	2nd leg	Golden Set
Shakhtyor Soligorsk (Belarus)	1–6	(Russia) Fakel Novy Urengoy	1–3	0–3	
Legion Obuhovo (Belarus)	3–5	(Belarus) Bate-Bgufk Borisov	0–3	3–2	
Viking TIF Bergen (Norway)	6–0	(Scotland) City of Edinburgh	3–0	3–0	
Međimurje Centrometal (Croatia)	3–5	(Slovenia) OK SIP Šempeter	3–2	0–3	
Vegyész RC Kazincbarcika (Hungary)	0–6	(Czech Republic) Jihostroj České Budějovice	0–3	0–3	
Maccabi Tel Aviv (Israel)	6–0	(Kosovo) Kv Luboteni Ferizaj	3–0	3–0	
Pafiakos Pafos (Cyprus)	1–6	(Turkey) Galatasaray HDI Istanbul	1–3	0–3	
Fonte Bastardo Açores (Portugal)	4–4	(Romania) Tricolorul LMV Ploiești	3–1	1–3	15–12
RSR Walfer Volleyball (Luxembourg)	0–6	(France) Chaumont VB 52	0–3	0–3	
S.L. Benfica (Portugal)	6–4	(Switzerland) Biogas Volley Näfels	3–2	3–2	
Spartaka Myjava (Slovakia)	6–0	(Austria) VCA Amstetten Niederösterreich	3–0	3–0	
Mladost Zagreb (Croatia)	5–4	(Austria) Union Raiffeisen Waldviertel	3–1	2–3	
Draisma Dynamo Apeldoorn (Netherlands)	6–0	(Switzerland) Lausanne UC	3–0	3–0	
Fino Kaposvár (Hungary)	4–3	(England) IBB Polonia London	3–0	1–3	10–15
Volei Municipal Zalău (Romania)	3–3	(Bosnia and Herzegovina) MOK Jedinstvo Brcko	3–0	0–3	8–15
Studenti Tirana (Albania)	0–6	(Turkey) Ziraat Bankası Ankara	0–3	0–3	

=== 8th finals ===
- 1st leg 17–19 January 2017
- 2nd leg 31 January – 2 February 2017

Team 1	Agg.	Team 2	1st leg	2nd leg	Golden Set
Bate-Bgufk Borisov (Belarus)	0–6	(Russia) Fakel Novy Urengoy	0–3	0–3	
Viking TIF Bergen (Norway)	6–2	(Slovenia) OK SIP Šempeter	3–1	3–1	
Jihostroj České Budějovice (Czech Republic)	0–6	(Israel) Maccabi Tel Aviv	0–3	0–3	
Fonte Bastardo Azores (Portugal)	0–6	(Turkey) Galatasaray HDI Istanbul	0–3	0–3	
S.L. Benfica (Portugal)	3–5	(France) Chaumont VB 52	0–3	3–2	
Spartaka Myjava (Slovakia)	3–3	(Croatia) Mladost Zagreb	3–0	0–3	22–20
Draisma Dynamo Apeldoorn (Netherlands)	5–4	(England) IBB Polonia London	3–1	2–3	
MOK Jedinstvo Brcko (Bosnia and Herzegovina)	0–6	(Turkey) Ziraat Bankası Ankara	0–3	0–3	

=== 4th finals ===
- 1st leg 14–16 February 2017
- 2nd leg 28 February – 1 March 2017

Team 1	Agg.	Team 2	1st leg	2nd leg
Fakel Novy Urengoy (Russia)	6–0	(Norway) Viking TIF Bergen	3–0	3–0
Maccabi Tel Aviv (Israel)	0–6	(Turkey) Galatasaray HDI Istanbul	0–3	0–3
Spartaka Myjava (Slovakia)	1–6	(France) Chaumont VB 52	0–3	1–3
Draisma Dynamo Apeldoorn (Netherlands)	1–6	(Turkey) Ziraat Bankası Ankara	1–3	0–3

== Final phase ==
=== Semi-finals ===
Team 1	Agg.	Team 2	1st leg	2nd leg
Fakel Novy Urengoy (Russia)	6–0	(Turkey) Galatasaray HDI Istanbul	3–0	3–0
Chaumont VB 52 (France)	5–4	(Turkey) Ziraat Bankası Ankara	3–1	2–3

==== First leg ====
Date	Time		Score		Set 1	Set 2	Set 3	Set 4	Set 5	Total	Report
29 Mar	19:00	Fakel Novy Urengoy (Russia)	3–0	(Turkey) Galatasaray HDI Istanbul	25–12	25–18	25–19			75–49	Report
29 Mar	20:00	Chaumont VB 52 (France)	3–1	(Turkey) Ziraat Bankası Ankara	25–21	25–19	28–30	25–18		103–88	Report

==== Second leg ====
Date	Time		Score		Set 1	Set 2	Set 3	Set 4	Set 5	Total	Report
2 Apr	19:00	Galatasaray HDI Istanbul (Turkey)	0–3	(Russia) Fakel Novy Urengoy	16–25	19–25	21–25			56–75	Report
2 Apr	14:00	Ziraat Bankası Ankara (Turkey)	3–2	(France) Chaumont VB 52	26–24	23–25	15–25	25–18	15–9	104–101	Report

=== Final ===
==== First leg ====
Date	Time		Score		Set 1	Set 2	Set 3	Set 4	Set 5	Total	Report
12 Apr	20:30	Chaumont VB 52 (France)	1–3	(Russia) Fakel Novy Urengoy	12–25	25–15	24–26	28–30		89–96	Report

==== Second leg ====
Date	Time		Score		Set 1	Set 2	Set 3	Set 4	Set 5	Total	Report
16 Apr	17:00	Fakel Novy Urengoy (Russia)	3–1	(France) Chaumont VB 52	21–25	25–20	25–19	25–18		96–82	Report

== Final standing ==
Rank	Team
1st place, gold medalist(s)	(Russia) Fakel Novy Urengoy
2nd place, silver medalist(s)	(France) Chaumont VB 52
Semifinalists	(Turkey) Galatasaray HDI Istanbul
Semifinalists	(Turkey) Ziraat Bankası Ankara

2017 Men's CEV Challenge Cup winner
(Russia)
Fakel Novy Urengoy
1st title

Ilia Vlasov, Sergei Pirainen, Vadym Likhosherstov, Andrey Alekseev, Igor Kolodinsky, Ivan Iakovlev, Denis Bogdan, Artem Tokhtash, Vladimir Shishkin, Alexander Kimerov, Dmitry Volkov, Valentin Bezrukov, Egor Kliuka, Mikhail Bondarenko
Head coach
Camillo Placi
