= Paul Buchegger =

Austrian volleyball player (born 1996)

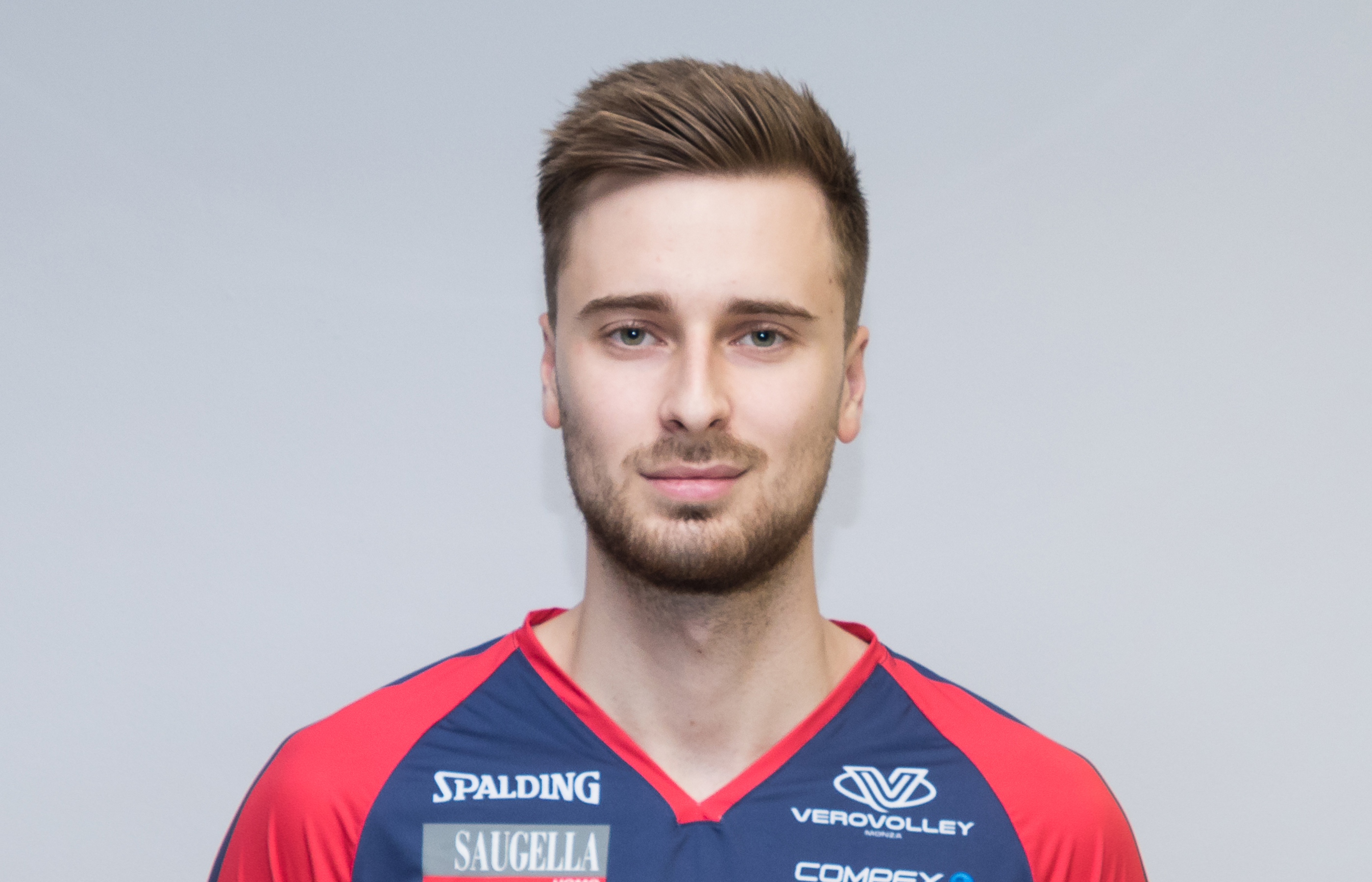

Personal information
- Nationality: (Austria) Austrian
- Born: 4 March 1996 (age 30); Linz, Austria
- Height: 2.04 m (6 ft 8 in)
- Weight: 98 kg (216 lb)
- Spike: 347 cm (137 in)
- Block: 330 cm (130 in)

Volleyball information
- Position: Opposite
- Current club: (Italy) Tonno Callipo Calabria Vibo Valentia
- Number: 17

Career
Years	Teams
2013–2015; 2015–2016; 2016–2017; 2017–2018; 2018–2020; 2020–2021; 2021–2022; 2022–2023	(Austria) UVC Graz (Germany) Volleyball Bisons Bühl (Italy) Sieco Service Ortona (Italy) Bunge Ravenna (Italy) Vero Volley Monza (Italy) Leo Shoes Modena (Turkey) Spor Toto Spor Kulübü (Italy) Tonno Callipo Calabria Vibo Valentia

National team
Austria
Honours
Men's volleyball
Representing Austria
European League
Bronze medal – third place	2016 Bulgaria

Paul Buchegger (born 4 March 1996) is an Austrian volleyball player, member of the Austria men's national volleyball team and Italian club Tonno Callipo Calabria Vibo Valentia.

== Sporting achievements ==
=== Clubs ===
- CEV Challenge Cup
  - 2017/2018 – with Bunge Ravenna
  - 2018/2019 – with Vero Volley Monza
- National championships
  - 2014/2015 Austrian Cup, with UVC Graz

=== Individual awards ===
- 2018: CEV Challenge Cup – Most Valuable Player
