= Associação Académica de Espinho =

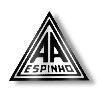
- Short name: AA Espinho
- Ground: Espinho, Portugal
- League: A1 - Portugal
- 2011-12 season: 6th
- Website: Club home page

Uniforms
Home	Away

Associação Académica de Espinho is a sports club based in Espinho, Portugal. It has a volleyball team playing in Portuguese Volleyball League A1, a roller hockey team (in Second Division), and a women's handball team.

== History ==
Founded by a group of 25 young students on 22 January 1938, it is considered to be of Public Utility by order of the prime minister of 15 September 1978.

== Achievements ==
- Portuguese Volleyball League A1: 1

1989/90
