= Carlos Teixeira =

Portuguese volleyball player (born 1976)

Personal information
- Full name: Carlos Miguel Jesus Teixeira
- Nationality: Portuguese
- Born: March 11, 1976 (age 50); Matosinhos, Portugal

Volleyball information
- Position: Libero

Carlos Miguel Jesus Teixeira (born March 11, 1976) is a volleyball player from Portugal, who plays as a libero for the Men's National Team. He became Best Digger at the second 2008 Olympic Qualification Tournament in Espinho, where Portugal ended up in second place and missed qualification for the 2008 Summer Olympics in Beijing, PR China.

== Honours ==
- 2002 World Championship — 8th place
- 2008 Olympic Qualification Tournament — 2nd place (did not qualify)
