= Bruno Cunha =

Portuguese volleyball player (born 1997)

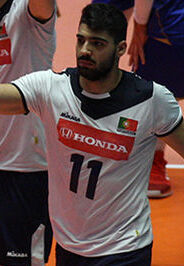
- Cunha in 2019

Personal information
- Nationality: Portuguese
- Born: 18 August 1997 (age 29)
- Height: 199 cm (6 ft 6 in)
- Weight: 90 kg (198 lb)
- Spike: 320 cm (126 in)
- Block: 308 cm (121 in)

Volleyball information
- Number: 24 (national team)

Career
Years	Teams
2015	VC Viana

National team
2015	Portugal

Bruno Cunha (born 18 August 1997) is a Portuguese male volleyball player. He is part of the Portugal men's national volleyball team. On club level he plays for VC Viana.
