= S.L. Benfica (volleyball) =

Portuguese professional volleyball team

Benfica
- Full name: Sport Lisboa e Benfica
- Nickname: As Águias (The Eagles); Os Encarnados (The Reds)
- Founded: 31 May 1939 (87 years ago)
- Ground: Pavilhão da Luz Nº 2 (Capacity: 1,800)
- Manager: Marcel Matz
- League: League A1
- 2025-26: Runners-up
- Website: Club home page
- Championships: 12

Uniforms
Home	Away

Sport Lisboa e Benfica (Portuguese pronunciation: [sɨˈpɔɾ liʒˈβoɐ i βɐ̃jˈfikɐ]), commonly known as Benfica, is a professional volleyball team based in Lisbon, Portugal, that plays in the Portuguese First Division.

Founded in 1939, Benfica have won 12 Portuguese league titles, a record 21 Portuguese Cup and a record 12 Portuguese Super Cup. As of October 2025, Benfica is ranked 30th in the men's European clubs ranking.

== History ==
=== Beginning ===
Founded on 31 May 1939, Benfica is one of the oldest Portuguese volleyball teams. Not having the success and notability of other club sections such as basketball and roller hockey, Benfica's volleyball team won their first title 27 years after being founded.

=== Road to the first title ===
From 1965–66 to 1979–80, Benfica played ten Portuguese Cup finals, winning seven. In 1980–81, led by coach Fernando Luís, Benfica finally achieved their first league title, with players such as Luís Quelhas, Manuel Silva, Jorge Infante, José Barros, João Abelho, Pedro Barros, Ilídio Ramos, and already with a young José Jardim appearing in some matches.

=== Second title and disbandment ===
In a vibrating match against local rivals Sporting CP, trailing 2–0 at Nave de Alvalade, Benfica, now led by captain José Jardim, alongside teammates Nuno Brites, Luís Quelhas, Nilson Júnior, Eduardo Gallina, Miguel Silva, Márcio Karas, Davidkov, and Radoslav Peytchev, managed to recover the disadvantage and win the match 3–2, claiming their second title.

In the 1993–94 season, then club president Jorge de Brito decided to disband the volleyball team. The following president, João Vale e Azevedo, restarted it in 1996–97 but in the Third Division. Former player José Jardim led Benfica back to the first tier in 2000 with the help of players such as André Cabacinha, Nuno Brites, António Silva, and captain José Fernandez.

=== Third title ===
In 2004–05, with coach José Jardim and players such as Brazilians Adriano Lamb, Renato Júnior, André França, Roberto Purificação, André Lukianetz, as well as Portuguese players André Lopes, Carlos Teixeira, António Silva, Rui Guedes, António Seco, José Simões, Bruno Feteira, and Pedro Fiúza, Benfica won the third title for the section, plus their 11th Portuguese Cup.

=== Between championships ===
The next season, important players, such as Adriano Lamb, Renato Junior and André França, left, and Benfica only managed to win the Portuguese Cup and reach the quarter-finals of CEV Top Teams Cup.

In the 2006–07 season, Benfica won their third Portuguese Cup in a row and 12th overall.

Three years later, in 2010–11, Benfica signed Hugo Gaspar and Flávio Cruz, who were later joined by Roberto Reis in 2011–12, all players from the Portugal national team. In spite of these investments, the team failed to win the league, coming runners-up to Fonte Bastardo in the first season, and then to Sporting de Espinho in the second one. Nevertheless, Benfica managed to win the Portuguese Cup and Super Cup in 2010–11, and another Portuguese Cup in 2011–12.

=== Back-to-back titles ===
In 2012–13, Portuguese international Flávio Cruz left for Espinho and was replaced by Brazilian Willian Reffati. A new setter, Brazilian Rafael "Vinhedo", was also contracted to replace Ronaldo "Royal" and Robert Koch. Benfica started the season by winning their third Super Cup, defeating Espinho 3–0.

On 4 May 2013, Benfica defeated league title holders Espinho 3–2 and conquered their fourth championship, after a seven-year wait and three consecutive second places. After SC Espinho protested at the Portuguese Volleyball Federation on a basis of a technical error, the final match was annulled and scheduled to be replayed on 12 May. Still, Benfica won the replay match 3–1. In the following season, on 4 May 2014, Benfica successfully defended their league title by defeating Fonte Bastardo 3–1; consequently, they secured their first back-to-back titles ever.

On 9 May 2015, Benfica won a third consecutive league title for the first time in their history, winning away 3–0 away to Fonte Bastardo in the fifth and final match (3–2). Moreover, Benfica also won the Portuguese Cup and Super Cup, thus winning all domestic competitions. On 3 October 2015, Benfica won a fifth consecutive Super Cup and became the club with most trophies in that competition (6).

=== Mixed Success ===
In the following four seasons, Benfica won two league titles (2016–17 and 2018–19) and finished runners-up in the other two (2015–16 and 2017–18). The team also claimed three Portuguese Cups (2015–16, 2017–18, and 2018–19) and three Super Cups (2015–16, 2016–17, and 2018–19).

=== Dominance under Marcel Matz ===
After winning the 2018–19 league title, Benfica, under the guidance of coach Marcel Matz, established itself as the dominant force in Portuguese volleyball, securing four consecutive league titles (2020–21, '21–22, '22–23, and '23–24), two Portuguese Cups (2021–22 and 2022–23), and three Super Cups (2019, '20, '21).

In 2024–25, Benfica won both the Portuguese Cup and the Super Cup, but after five consecutive league titles the team lost the championship to Sporting CP, finishing as runners-up for the first time in six years.

== Seasons ==
As of 4 June 2026

Season	Pos	Playoffs	Cup	Super Cup	European competitions		Other competitions	
Season	League		Cup	Super Cup	Competition	Result	Competition	Result
1938–39	—	—	—	—	—	—	—	—
1939–40	—	—	—	—	—	—	—	—
1940–41	—	—	—	—	—	—	—	—
1941–42	—	—	—	—	—	—	—	—
1942–43	—	—	—	—	—	—	—	—
1943–44	—	—	—	—	—	—	—	—
1944–45	—	—	—	—	—	—	—	—
1945–46	—	—	—	—	—	—	—	—
1946–47	—	—	—	—	—	—	—	—
1947–48	—	—	—	—	—	—	—	—
1948–49	—	—	—	—	—	—	—	—
1949–50	—	—	—	—	—	—	—	—
1950–51	—	—	—	—	—	—	—	—
1951–52	—	—	—	—	—	—	—	—
1952–53	1st	—	—	—	—	—	—	—
1953–54	—	—	—	—	—	—	—	—
1954–55	—	—	—	—	—	—	—	—
1955–56	—	—	—	—	—	—	—	—
1956–57	—	—	—	—	—	—	—	—
1957–58	—	—	—	—	—	—	Campeonato Regional de Lisboa Taça de Encerramento da AVL	W W
1958–59	—	—	—	—	—	—	Campeonato Regional de Lisboa Taça de Encerramento da AVL	W W
1959–60	—	—	—	—	—	—	Campeonato Regional de Lisboa Taça de Encerramento da AVL	W W
1960–61	—	—	—	—	—	—	Campeonato Regional de Lisboa Taça de Encerramento da AVL	W W
1961–62	—	—	—	—	—	—	—	—
1962–63	—	—	—	—	—	—	Taça de Encerramento da AVL	W
1963–64	—	—	—	—	—	—	—	—
1964–65	—	—	—	—	—	—	—	—
1965–66	—	—	W	—	—	—	—	—
1966–67	—	—	RU	—	—	—	—	—
1967–68	—	—	—	—	—	—	Taça de Abertura da AVL	W
1968–69	—	—	RU	—	—	—	—	—
1969–70	—	—	RU	—	—	—	—	—
1970–71	—	—	—	—	—	—	Campeonato Regional de Lisboa	W
1971–72	—	—	RU	—	—	—	Campeonato Regional de Lisboa	W
1972–73	—	—	—	—	—	—	Campeonato Regional de Lisboa	W
1973–74	—	—	W	—	—	—	—	—
1974–75	—	—	W	—	Cup Winner's Cup	1R	Campeonato Regional de Lisboa	W
1975–76	—	—	W	—	—	—	Campeonato Regional de Lisboa	W
1976–77	—	—	—	—	Cup Winner's Cup	1R	Campeonato Regional de Lisboa	W
1977–78	—	—	W	—	—	—	Campeonato Regional de Lisboa	W
1978–79	—	—	W	—	—	—	Campeonato Regional de Lisboa	W
1979–80	—	—	W	—	—	—	Campeonato Regional de Lisboa	W
1980–81	1st	—	—	—	—	—	Campeonato Regional de Lisboa	W
1981–82	—	—	—	—	European Cup	PR	Campeonato Regional de Lisboa	W
1982–83	—	—	—	—	—	—	Taça de Encerramento da AVL	W
1983–84	—	—	SF	—	—	—	Campeonato Regional de Lisboa	W
1984–85	—	—	—	—	—	—	Campeonato Regional de Lisboa	W
1985–86	—	—	—	—	—	—	—	—
1986–87	—	—	—	—	—	—	—	—
1987–88	—	—	—	—	—	—	Taça de Abertura da AVL	W
1988–89	—	—	—	—	Cup Winner's Cup	1R	—	—
1989–90	—	—	W	W	—	—	Taça da Federação	W
1990–91	W	—	1R	RU	Cup Winner's Cup	GS	—	—
1991–92	—	—	W	RU	European Cup	R16	—	—
1992–93	—	—	RU	—	Cup Winner's Cup	R16	Taça de Honra da AVL	W
1993–94	—	—	—	—	Challenge Cup	1R	—	—
1994–95
1995–96
1996–97
1997–98	1st	—	1R	—	—	—	Campeonato Regional de Lisboa Taça de Honra da AVL	W W
1998–99	—	—	QF	—	—	—	—	—
1999–00	—	—	—	—	—	—	Taça de Honra da AVL	W
2000–01	—	—	—	—	—	—	Taça de Honra da AVL	W
2001–02	7th	—	QF	—	—	—	—	—
2002–03	5th	—	R16	—	—	—	Taça de Honra da AVL	W
2003–04	7th	—	R16	—	—	—	—	—
2004–05	1st	—	W	—	—	—	—	—
2005–06	4th	—	W	—	CEV Top Teams Cup	QF	Taça de Honra da AVL	W
2006–07	4th	—	W	—	—	—	Taça de Honra da AVL	W
2007–08	4th	—	1R	—	—	—	Taça de Honra da AVL	W
2008–09	3rd	—	SF	—	—	—	—	—
2009–10	2nd	RU	RU	—	—	—	—	—
2010–11	1st	RU	W	—	—	—	—	—
2011–12	2nd	RU	W	W	—	—	—	—
2012–13	1st	W	R16	W	—	—	—	—
2013–14	1st	W	SF	W	—	—	Taça de Honra da AVL	W
2014–15	2nd	W	W	W	CEV Challenge Cup	RU	Taça AVL	W
2015–16	1st	RU	W	W	CEV Challenge Cup	SF	—	—
2016–17	1st	W	RU	W	CEV Challenge Cup	R16	—	—
2017–18	2nd	RU	W	RU	CEV Challenge Cup	QF	—	—
2018–19	1st	W	W	W	CEV Challenge Cup	R16	—	—
2019–20	1st	N/A	N/A	W	CEV Champions League	GS	—	—
2020–21	1st	W	RU	W	CEV Challenge Cup	R16	—	—
2021–22	1st	W	W	W	CEV Champions League	GS	—	—
2022–23	1st	W	W	RU	CEV Champions League	GS	—	—
2023–24	1st	W	SF	W	CEV Champions League	GS	Iberian Cup	RU
2024–25	1st	RU	W	W	CEV Champions League CEV Cup	1R R16	Iberian Cup	RU
2025–26	2nd	RU	RU	RU	CEV Challenge Cup	Round of 16	—	—

== International competition results ==
Note: Benfica score is always listed first.

Season	Competition	Round	Opposition	Score	Aggregate
1974–75	Cup Winner's Cup	Qualification round	(Belgium) ASUB Bruxelles	1–3 (H); 1–3 (A)	2–6
1976–77	Cup Winner's Cup	Qualification round	(Austria) Sokol Wien	3–2 (H); 1–3 (A)	4–5
1981–82	CEV Champions Cup	Qualification round	(Greece) Olympiacos S.C.	0–3 (H); 0–3 (A)	0–6
1988–89	Cup Winner's Cup	Qualification round	(Spain) CV Guaguas	0–3 (H); 1–3 (A)	1–6
1990–91	CEV Cup Winners' Cup	Group Stage	(Belgium) Knack Roeselare	1–3 (H)	—
1990–91	CEV Cup Winners' Cup	Group Stage	(Greece) Panathinaikos V.C.	1–3 (H)	—
1990–91	CEV Cup Winners' Cup	Group Stage	(France) Frejus	3–0 (A)	—
1990–91	CEV Cup Winners' Cup	Group Stage	(Greece) Panathinaikos V.C.	3–0 (A)	—
1990–91	CEV Cup Winners' Cup	Group Stage	(France) Frejus	1–3 (H)	—
1990–91	CEV Cup Winners' Cup	Group Stage	(Belgium) Knack Roeselare	3–0 (A)	—
1991–92	CEV Champions Cup	First qualification round	(Switzerland) Lausanne UC	1–3 (A); 3–0 (H)	4–3
1991–92	CEV Champions Cup	Second qualification round	(Serbia) OK Partizan	1–3 (A); 3–2 (H)	4–5
1992–93	CEV Cup Winners' Cup	R16	(Spain) CD San José	3–2 (H); 0–3 (A)	3–5
1993–94	CEV Cup Winners' Cup	First qualification round	(Spain) Grupo Duero Soria	2–3 (H); 0–3 (A)	2–6
2005–06	CEV Top Teams Cup	Group C	(Serbia) OK Vojvodina	2–3 (H); 1–3 (A)	—
2005–06	CEV Top Teams Cup	Group C	(Hungary) Vegyész RC-Kazincbarcika	3–1 (H); 3–2 (A)	—
2005–06	CEV Top Teams Cup	Group C	(Romania) C.V.M. Tomis Constanța	0–3 (A); 3–0 (H)	—
2005–06	CEV Top Teams Cup	Quarter-final	(Spain) CV Palma	0–3 (A); 1–3 (H)	1–6
2014–15	CEV Challenge Cup	Round of 32	(Serbia) OK Partizan	3–1 (A); 3–1 (H)	—
2014–15	CEV Challenge Cup	Round of 16	(Portugal) Fonte Bastardo	3–2 (H); 3–0 (A)	6–2
2014–15	CEV Challenge Cup	Quarter-final	(Greece) Ethnikos Alexandroupolis	3–0 (H); 3–2 (A)	6–2
2014–15	CEV Challenge Cup	Semi-final	(Italy) CMC Ravenna	3–0 (H); 2–3 (A)	5–3
2014–15	CEV Challenge Cup	Final	(Serbia) Vojvodina NS Seme Novi Sad	1–3 (A); 3–2 (H)	4–5
2015–16	CEV Challenge Cup	Second qualification round	(Switzerland) Biogas Volley Näfels	3–0 (A); 3–1 (H)	6–1
2015–16	CEV Challenge Cup	Round of 32	(Belgium) Topvolley Antwerpen	3–1 (H); 2–3 (A)	5–4
2015–16	CEV Challenge Cup	Round of 16	(Turkey) Istanbul BBSK	1–3 (A); 3–0 (H)	4–3
2015–16	CEV Challenge Cup	Quarter-final	(Greece) Ethnikos Alexandroupolis	3–1 (H); 3–2 (A)	6–3
2015–16	CEV Challenge Cup	Semi-final	(Italy) Calzedonia Verona	3–2 (A); 1–3 (H)	4–5
2016–17	CEV Challenge Cup	Round of 32	(Switzerland) Biogas Volley Näfels	3–2 (H); 3–2 (A)	6–4
2016–17	CEV Challenge Cup	Round of 16	(France) Chaumont VB 52	0–3 (H); 3–2 (A)	3–5
2017–18	CEV Challenge Cup	Second qualification round	(Romania) C.S. Remat Zalău	3–1 (H); 3–2 (A)	6–3
2017–18	CEV Challenge Cup	Round of 32	(Austria) UVC Holding Graz	3–0 (H); 3–0 (A)	6–0
2017–18	CEV Challenge Cup	Round of 16	(Romania) Steaua București	3–2 (A); 3–1 (H)	6–3
2017–18	CEV Challenge Cup	Quarter-final	(Italy) Bunge Ravenna	1–3 (A); 2–3 (H)	3–6
2018–19	CEV Challenge Cup	Second qualification round	(Cyprus) Pafiakos Pafos	3–0 (H); 3–0 (A)	6–0
2018–19	CEV Challenge Cup	Round of 32	(Greece) Iraklis V.C.	3–0 (H); 3–0 (A)	6–0
2018–19	CEV Challenge Cup	Round of 16	(Romania) VM Zalău	3–0 (H); 3–1 (A)	6–1
2018–19	CEV Challenge Cup	Quarter-final	(Russia) Belgorie Belgorod	0–3 (A); 3–1 (H)	3–4
2019–20	CEV Champions League	First qualification round	(Bosnia and Herzegovina) Mladost Brcko	3–0 (A); 3–0 (H)	6–0
2019–20	CEV Champions League	Second qualification round	(Montenegro) OK Budva	3–0 (H); 3–1 (A)	6–1
2019–20	CEV Champions League	Third qualification round	(Croatia) Mladost Zagreb	3–0 (H); 3–1 (A)	6–1
2019–20	CEV Champions League	Group Stage	(Italy) Umbria Volley Perugia	1–3 (A)	—
2019–20	CEV Champions League	Group Stage	(Poland) Projekt Warsaw	3–1 (H)	—
2019–20	CEV Champions League	Group Stage	(France) Tours VB	1–3 (H)	—
2019–20	CEV Champions League	Group Stage	(Poland) Projekt Warsaw	1–3 (A)	
2019–20	CEV Champions League	Group Stage	(Italy) Umbria Volley Perugia	1–3 (H)	—
2019–20	CEV Champions League	Group Stage	(France) Tours VB	1–3 (A)	—
2020–21	CEV Challenge Cup	R32	(Hungary) Vegyész Kazincbarcika	3–0 (A); 3–0 (H)	6–1
2020–21	CEV Challenge Cup	R16	(Turkey) Halkbank Ankara	1–3 (A)	1–3
2021–22	CEV Champions League	First qualification round	(Estonia) Tartu Volleyball	1–3 (A); 3–1 (H)	4–4
2021–22	CEV Champions League	Second qualification round	(Finland) VaLePa Sastamala	3–0 (H); 3–1 (A)	6–1
2021–22	CEV Champions League	Third qualification round	(Czech Republic) VK ČEZ Karlovarsko	2–3 (H); 3–1 (A)	5–4
2021–22	CEV Champions League	Group Stage	(Russia) VC Zenit Saint Petersburg	0–3 (A)	—
2021–22	CEV Champions League	Group Stage	(Germany) BR Volleys	1–3 (H)	—
2021–22	CEV Champions League	Group Stage	(Germany) BR Volleys	0–3 (A)	—
2021–22	CEV Champions League	Group Stage	(Russia) VC Zenit Saint Petersburg	0–3 (H)	—
2021–22	CEV Champions League	Group Stage	(Serbia) OK Vojvodina	1–3 (A)	—
2021–22	CEV Champions League	Group Stage	(Serbia) OK Vojvodina	3–2 (H)	—
2022–23	CEV Champions League	Second qualification round	(Netherlands) Dynamo Apeldoorn	3–1 (A); 3–0 (H)	6–1
2022–23	CEV Champions League	Third qualification round	(Finland) VaLePa Sastamala	1–3 (A); 3–1 (H)	4–4
2022–23	CEV Champions League	Group Stage	(Italy) Volley Lube	3–2 (A)	—
2022–23	CEV Champions League	Group Stage	(Belgium) K.S.V. Roeselare	2–3 (H)	—
2022–23	CEV Champions League	Group Stage	(Belgium) K.S.V. Roeselare	0–3 (A)	—
2022–23	CEV Champions League	Group Stage	(Italy) Volley Lube	0–3 (H)	—
2022–23	CEV Champions League	Group Stage	(France) Tours VB	0–3 (A)	—
2022–23	CEV Champions League	Group Stage	(France) Tours VB	1–3 (H)	—
2023–24	Iberian Cup	Semi-Final	(Spain) CDV Río Duero	3–0 (N)	3–0
2023–24	Iberian Cup	Final	(Spain) CV Guaguas	1–3 (N)	1–3
2023–24	CEV Champions League	Group Stage	(Germany) BR Volleys	0–3 (A)	—
2023–24	CEV Champions League	Group Stage	(Italy) Volley Piacenza	1–3 (H)	—
2023–24	CEV Champions League	Group Stage	(Turkey) Halkbank Ankara	0–3 (A)	—
2023–24	CEV Champions League	Group Stage	(Italy) Volley Piacenza	0–3 (A)	—
2023–24	CEV Champions League	Group Stage	(Germany) BR Volleys	1–3 (H)	—
2023–24	CEV Champions League	Group Stage	(Turkey) Halkbank Ankara	2–3 (H)	—
2024–25	Iberian Cup	Semi-Final	(Spain) CDV Río Duero	3–0 (N)	3–0
2024–25	Iberian Cup	Final	(Portugal) Sporting	1–3 (N)	1–3
2024–25	CEV Champions League	1R	(Spain) CV Guaguas	1–3 (A); 3–2 (H)	4–5
2024–25	CEV Cup	1R	(Belgium) Haasrode Leuven	3–0 (A); 2–3 (H)	5–3
2024–25	CEV Cup	2R	(Slovenia) Calcit Volley	3–0 (A); 3–0 (H)	6–0
2024–25	CEV Cup	R16	(Italy) Trentino Volley	0–3 (H); 3–2 (A)	2–5
2025–26	CEV Challenge Cup	1R	(Croatia) OK Medjimurje	3–0 (A); 3–0 (H)	6–0
2025–26	CEV Challenge Cup	R32	(Romania) Arcada Galati	1–3 (A); 4–1 (H)	5–4
2025–26	CEV Challenge Cup	R16	(Turkey) Altekma SK	3–2 (H); 2–4 (A)	4–5

== Players ==
=== Men's Current squad ===
As of 2 November 2026

No.	Nationality	Player	Birthdate	Height	Position
2	Portugal	Bernardo Silva	27 September 1996 (age 30)	182	Libero
3	Portugal	Vasco Lopes	4 December 2008 (age 17)	195	Outside hitter
4	Austria	Peter Wohlfahrtstätter	10 March 1989 (age 37)	204	Middle blocker
5	Portugal	Tiago Abecasis	19 August 2010 (age 16)	190	Setter
7	Portugal	Ivo Casas	21 September 1992 (age 34)	180	Libero
9	United States	Zach Solomon	4 July 2003 (age 23)	193	Setter
10	Brazil	Abouba Dramé	16 February 1994 (age 32)	204	Opposite hitter
11	Netherlands	Twan Wiltenburg	20 January 1997 (age 29)	204	Middle blocker
15	Brazil	Kelvi Giovani	15 June 2001 (age 25)	204	Middle blocker
17	Portugal	Tiago Violas	27 March 1989 (age 37)	192	Setter
19	Portugal	Guilherme Menezes	20 December 2000 (age 25)	197	Middle blocker
14	Puerto Rico	Pelegrín Vargas	31 July 1998 (age 28)	193	Outside hitter
16	Portugal	Tomás Teixeira	16 June 2006 (age 20)	192	Outside hitter
18	Brazil	Japa	21 December 1990 (age 35)	195	Outside hitter
22	Portugal	Alexandre Ferreira	13 November 1991 (age 34)	202	Outside hitter

Coach: (Greece) Sakis Psarras

=== Women's current squad ===
As of 2 November 2026

No.	Nationality	Player	Birthdate	Height	Position
1	Brazil	Mara Leão	26 July 1991 (age 35)	192	Middle blocker
2	Argentina	Martina Bednarek	21 July 2006 (age 20)	187	Opposite hitter
3	Brazil	Mayara Barcelos	26 April 2001 (age 25)	181	Outside hitter
5	Portugal	Mariana Garcez	24 October 2005 (age 21)	186	Setter
6	Belgium	Jutta van de Vyver	11 June 1996 (age 30)	175	Setter
8	Portugal	Marta Aleixo	24 August 2007 (age 19)	173	Libero
11	Argentina	Tatiana Rizzo	30 December 1986 (age 39)	178	Libero
12	Brazil	Gabiru	14 December 1993 (age 32)	175	Outside hitter
13	Cuba	Claudia Tarín	26 January 2003 (age 23)	187	Outside hitter
15	Portugal	Joana Garcez	24 October 2005 (age 21)	185	Middle blocker
17	Portugal	Marlene Pereira	26 January 2002 (age 24)	181	Middle blocker
19	Cape Verde	Beatriz Santos	16 August 1995 (age 31)	195	Opposite hitter
22	Argentina	Cami Giraudo	3 April 2002 (age 24)	174	Outside hitter
27	Bulgaria	Aleksandra Saykova	22 July 2003 (age 23)	187	Middle blocker

Coach: (Brazil) Henrique Furtado

== Honours ==
According to Benfica's official website

=== Men's ===
Type	Competition	Titles	Seasons
Domestic	Portuguese Championship	12	1980–81, 1990–91, 2004–05, 2012–13, 2013–14, 2014–15, 2016–17, 2018–19, 2020–21, 2021–22, 2022–23, 2023–24
Domestic	Portuguese Cup	21	1965–66, 1973–74, 1974–75, 1975–76, 1977–78, 1978–79, 1979–80, 1989–90, 1991–92, 2004–05, 2005–06, 2006–07, 2010–11, 2011–12, 2014–15, 2015–16, 2017–18, 2018–19, 2021–22, 2022–23, 2024–25
Domestic	Portuguese Super Cup	12	1990, 2011, 2012, 2013, 2014, 2015, 2016, 2018, 2019, 2020, 2021, 2023

- record
- ^{s} shared record

=== Women's ===
Type	Competition	Titles	Seasons
Domestic	Portuguese League	10	1966–67, 1967–68, 1968–69, 1969–70, 1970–71, 1971–72, 1972–73, 1973–74, 1974–75, 2024–25
Domestic	Portuguese Cup	3	1972–73, 1973–74, 2023–24
Domestic	Super Cup	2	2024, 2025

- record
- ^{s} shared record
