= João Fidalgo =

Portuguese volleyball player (born 1986)

Personal information
- Nationality: Portuguese
- Born: 2 November 1986 (age 39)
- Height: 172 cm (5 ft 8 in)
- Weight: 67 kg (148 lb)
- Spike: 307 cm (121 in)
- Block: 285 cm (112 in)

Volleyball information
- Current club: Sporting CP
- Number: 17

Career
Years	Teams
2012-2016; 2016-2017; 2017-	AJ Fonte Bastardo; AA São Mamede; Sporting CP

National team
2015	Portugal

João Fidalgo (born 2 November 1986) is a Portuguese male volleyball player. He is part of the Portugal men's national volleyball team. On club level he plays for Sporting CP.
