= João José =

Portuguese volleyball player (born 1978)

Personal information
- Full name: João Miguel Sequeira José
- Nickname: João José
- Nationality: Portuguese
- Born: 7 June 1978 (age 48); Portimão, Portugal

João Miguel Sequeira José (born 7 June 1978 in Portimão) is a male volleyball player from Portugal. He finished in 8th place with the Men's National Team at the 2002 FIVB Men's World Championship, where he was named Best Blocker of the tournament.

== Awards ==
=== Individuals ===
- 2002 FIVB World Championship "Best Spiker"
