= Fonte do Bastardo =

- Civil parish
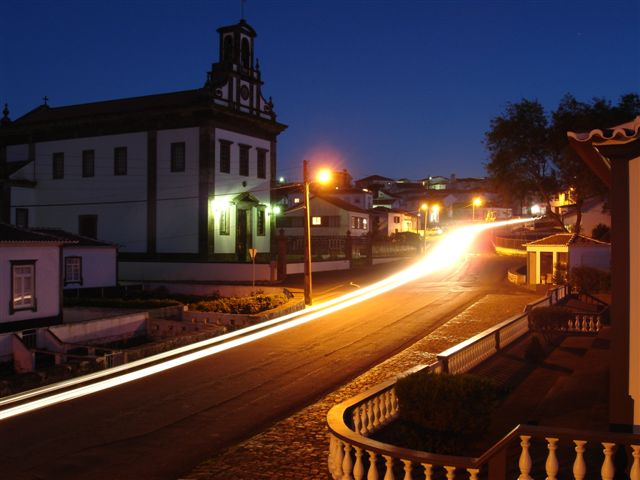
- Twilight in the village of Fonte do Bastardo, with the parochial church

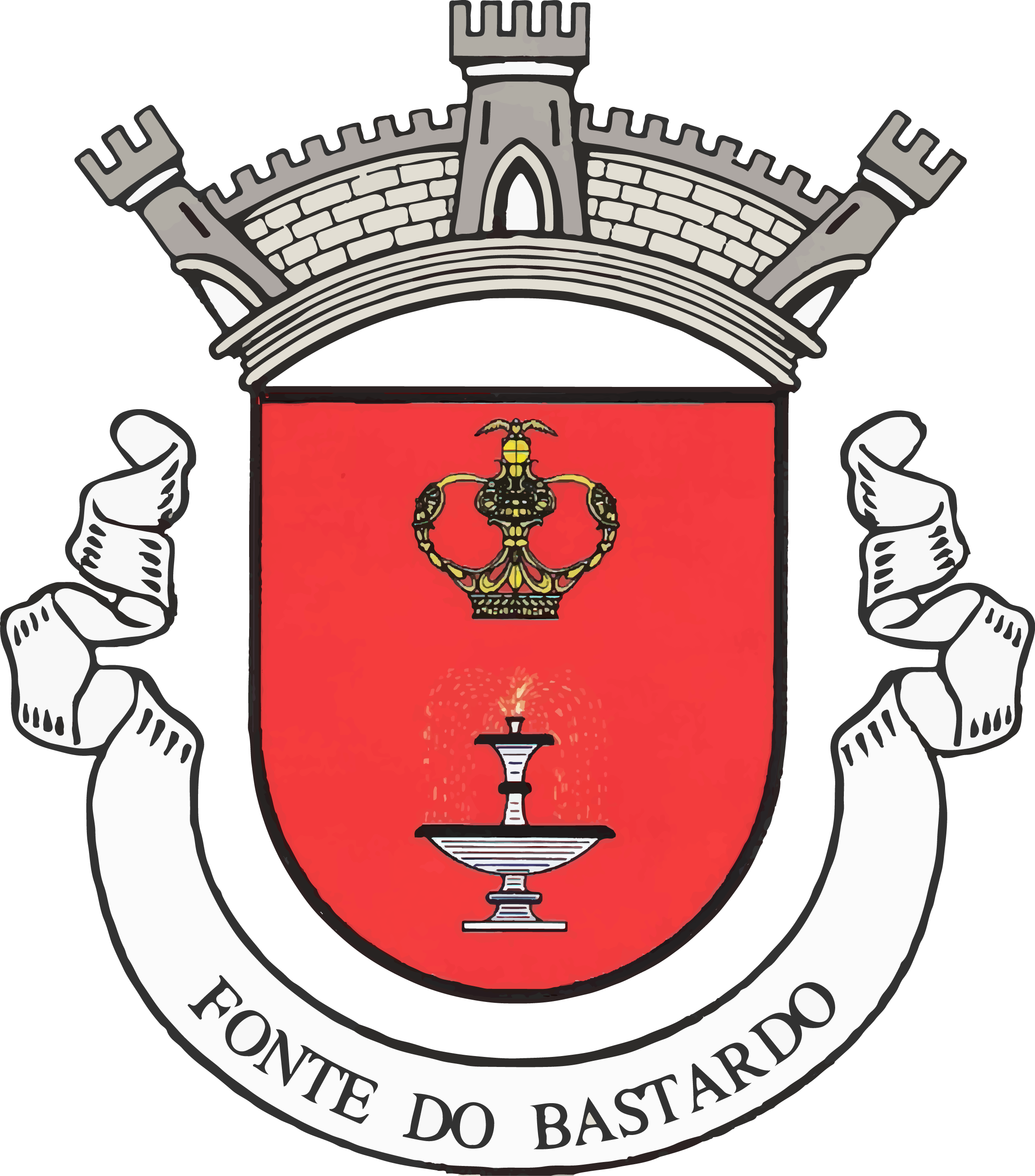
- Coat of arms

- Location in the Azores Fonte do Bastardo (Terceira)
- Coordinates: 38°41′33″N 27°4′56″W
- Country: Portugal
- Auton. region: Azores
- Island: Terceira
- Municipality: Praia da Vitória

Area
  - Total: 8.85 km^{2} (3.42 sq mi)
- Elevation: 128 m (420 ft)

Population (2011)
  - Total: 1,278
  - Density: 144/km^{2} (374/sq mi)
- Time zone: UTC−01:00 (AZOT)
  - Summer (DST): UTC+00:00 (AZOST)
- Postal code: 9760-180
- Area code: 292
- Patron: Santa Bárbara
- Website: www.freguesiafontebastardo.com

Fonte do Bastardo is a parish in the municipality of Praia da Vitória on the island of Terceira in the Portuguese Azores. The population in 2011 was 1,278, in an area of 8.85 km^{2} (3.42 sq mi). It contains the localities Canada dos Picos, Fonte do Bastardo, Lajedo, Nogueira, Recanto, Regêlo, Ribeira Seca de Baixo, Ribeira Seca de Cima and São José.

History

Fonte do Bastardo, located on the southern slopes of Serra do Cume on Terceira Island in the Azores, was established in the early 16th century. The village grew around freshwater springs in Ribeira dos Lagos, which became a vital resource for early settlers and a site of pilgrimage for people from nearby towns. By the mid-16th century, the village housed about seventy families.

The community's first church, dedicated to Santa Bárbara, was built on a promontory near Pico da Bagacina but was largely destroyed by an earthquake, leaving only its chapel and cemetery. Masses were temporarily held at the Chapel of São José until it too was destroyed by a quake in 1801. For over a century, villagers used the ruins of the original church for religious services until a new church was completed in 1904 with the support of a wealthy expatriate, Francisco Soares de Oliveira.

Fonte do Bastardo is known for its innovative spirit, introducing the island's first windmill, public bus service, bullfighting arena, and a cooperative established in 1975. The village also achieved recognition through its championship volleyball team.

The origin of the name "Fonte do Bastardo" remains a mystery. Theories suggest it may refer to an illegitimate child of a prominent settler or noble, a figure exiled to the island, or perhaps a legendary or heroic individual associated with the area's development. This unresolved history adds an air of mystique to the village, intertwining factual accounts with local lore.
