= Valdir Sequeira =

Portuguese volleyball player

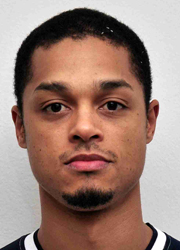
- Sequeira in 2011

Personal information
- Full name: Valdir Sousa Sequeira
- Nationality: Portuguese
- Born: 22 November 1981 (age 44)
- Height: 196 cm (6 ft 5 in)
- Weight: 90 kg (198 lb)
- Spike: 360 cm (142 in)
- Block: 348 cm (137 in)

Volleyball information
- Position: Opposite/Outside Hitter
- Current club: Hapoel Hammapil
- Number: 13 (national team)

Career
- Years: Team
- 2001 2007 2015 2017–: S.L. Benfica; Vitória SC; SC Espinho; Sporting CP

National team
- Years: Team
- 2001–2019: Portugal

Valdir Sousa Sequeira (born 22 November 1981) is a Portuguese male volleyball player of Angolan descent. He is part of the Portugal men's national volleyball team. On club level he plays for Sporting CP since october 2017. Firstly he joined S.L. Benfica in 2001, followed by Académica de Coimbra where he played two seasons, after which he had his first experience outside of Portugal playing two seasons in Italy at Prisma Volley, where He Won the Italian A2 championship, going next to Germany where it makes an era in the General Haching. In 2007 Valdir returns to Portugal to represent Vitória SC Where they Won the Portuguese Championship, returning to Italy the following year where he plays for Monini Marconi Spoleto (07/08), Stamplast Martina Franca (08/09), Copra Volley Piacenza (09/10) where He Won the Italian SuperCoppa, Eurogroup Gela (10/11) and LB Casa Rurale Cantu (11/12). After Italy follows Austria to play in the SK Posojilnica Aich / Dob where he wins the championship on (12/13) and being announce as MVP player of the championship following one more season (13/14) on Sk Posojilnica Aich / Dob where he left a remarkable Champions League games Against world best teams, and secure Silver Medal in the Austria league and once more being announced as MVP player of the championship. In 2014 he will return to Portugal to play for SC Espinho and in 2015 he go to Israel where he represent Maccabi Tel Aviv and being announced MVP player from Israel League, from where he went to VK Prievidza of Slovakia where he secure a Silver Medal. Currently he just started playing for Sporting CP.
