= Chaumont Volley-Ball 52 =

French volleyball club

Chaumont VB 52
- Full name: Chaumont Volley-Ball 52 Haute-Marne
- Nickname: CVB52HM / CVB52
- Founded: 1996
- Ground: Palestra (Capacity: 3287)
- Chairman: Bruno Soirfeck
- Manager: Silvano Prandi
- League: LNV Ligue A
- 2023–24: 4th
- Website: Club home page

Uniforms
| Home | Away |

Chaumont Volley-Ball 52 is a French volleyball club, founded in 1996 and based in Chaumont (Haute-Marne) and have played in Ligue A since the 2012–2013 season. It won the 2017 LNV Ligue A and the French Supercup in 2017 and 2021. The club finished second in the same year of the CEV Cup. It also participates in other major European competitions such as CEV Champions League and CEV Top Teams Cup.

== History ==
=== Origins ===
CVB52 was formed in 1963 under the name of 'ASPTT Chaumont' , when a volleyball section was started by director Robert Jeanmougin. The first team was made up of postal and telecom workers who competed during the first years in the spring Chaumontais corporate championship.

In 1976, the team reached National 3 after winning the Coupe de France of ASPTT clubs.

In 1984, the team again entered local corporate competitions, achieving numerous successes both in the championship and in the Haute-Marne Cup. Shortly afterwards, ASPTT General President, Mr Hirtzlin obtained access to a field with changing rooms at Les Lavières in Brottes.

From 1987, at the initiative of Jean-Michel Lesprit, a female section was created, which was the only female team in the department. They became of DH champion, failing little to rise in 3rd division.

In 1990, President Bernard Huguenel was replaced by Martial Guillaume. The team reached the Nationale 2 and turned professional in 1993. Three years later, in 1996, the team competes in Pro B, when it becomes Chaumont Volley-Ball 52 Haute-Marne.

=== Second division ===
Since 1998 the CVB52 has received support from the inhabitants of the town of Chaumont and the department of Haute Marne. The same year Christian Marcenac replaces Martial Guillaume as the president of the CVB52HM.

In 2001 Chantal Thévenot replaced Bernard Huguenel as President and many changes take place at the level of training. During the 2001–2002 season, Gilbert Gléyot became the new president of the club.

=== First division ===
After spending 16 seasons in the second division, the club won the 2011–12 League B championship and is promoted to the first division for the first time in its history.

In its fifth season in the 2016–2017 A league, the CVB52HM won the French championship by beating Toulouse in the final 3–0 and subsequently won the French Volleyball Supercup against GFC Ajaccio 3–1 (16–25 25–23 25–13 25–20).

During the 2017–18 and 2018–19 seasons, the CVB finished in second place in the championship and the Coupe de France.

In the 2020–21 championship, the CVB52 finished for the third time in second place in Ligue A. Shortly after the club won its second French Super Cup title against AS Cannes VB 0–3 (25–20 27–25 28–30).

=== European competitions ===
In 2017, CVB52HM participated in its first European tournament, the CEV Challenge Cup, finishing the competition in second place after losing the final against Novy Urengoy (1–3).

The CVB participated the following two years in the CEV Champions League, finishing 12th in 2018 in the Play-off and 8th i 2019 in the Play-off.

In 2020 and in 2021, the CVB finished in the last 16 at the CEV Cup.

== Honours and achievements ==
=== Domestic competitions ===
French League

- Winners (1): 2017
- Runners up (3): 2018, 2019, 2021

French Cup

- Winners (1): 2022
- Runners-up (2): 2018, 2019

French Supercup

- Winners (2): 2017, 2021

French League B

- Runners-up (2): 2010, 2012

=== European competitions ===
CEV Champions League

- play-offs: 2018

CEV Top Teams Cup

CEV Cup

- Runners up (1): 2017

=== World competitions ===
FIVB Volleyball Men's Club World Championship

== Important personal ==
=== Coaches ===
| Rang | Name | Period |
|---|---|---|
| 1 | (France) Dominique Hallart | 1996–1998 |
| 2 | (France) Roger Valée | 1998–1999 |
| 3 | (France) Daniel Draghici & Dominique Hallart | 1999–2000 |
| 4 | (Romania) Ion Dobre | 2000–2002 |
| 5 | (France) Olivier Lardier | 2002–2004 |
| 6 | (Romania) / (France) Pompiliu Dascălu | 2004–2009 |
| 7 | (Serbia) / (France) Nikola Matijasevic | 2009–2014 |
| 8 | (Serbia) Duško Nikolić | 2014–2015 |
| 9 | (Italy) Silvano Prandi | 2015– |

=== Chairmen ===
| Rang | Name | Period |
|---|---|---|
| 1 | (France) Martial Guillaume | 1996–1998 |
| 2 | (France) Christian Marcenac | 1998–2001 |
| 3 | (France) Chantal Thévenot | 2001 |
| 4 | (France) Gilbert Gléyot | 2001–2007 |
| 5 | (France) Éric Vigneron | 2007–2009 |
| 6 | (France) Bruno Soirfeck | 2009– |

=== Notable players ===
- (France) Romain Vadeleux
- (France) Horacio d'Almeida
- (France) Stéphen Boyer
- (France) Jonas Aguenier
- (France) Yacine Louati
- (France) Baptiste Geiler
- (Netherlands) Gijs Jorna
- (Netherlands) Ewoud Gommans
- (Slovakia) Matej Paták
- (Bulgaria) Martin Atanasov
- (Spain) Jorge Fernández Valcárcel
- (Finland) Sauli Sinkkonen
- (Latvia) Hermans Egleskalns
- (Cuba) Osniel Melgarejo
- (Portugal) André Lopes
- (Serbia) Miloš Terzić
- (Argentina) Sebastián Closter
- (Argentina) Bruno Lima
- (Canada) Blair Bann
- (Cuba) Jesús Herrera Jaime
- (Canada) Rudy Verhoeff
- (Canada) Daniel Jansen Van Doorn
- (Cuba) Javier González Panton
- (United States) Daniel McDonnell
- (United States) Mitchell Stahl
- (United States) Taylor Averill
- (Tunisia) Wassim Ben Tara
- (Cameroon) Nathan Wounembaina

== Infrastructure ==
The club's headquarters are located in the Jean Masson Hall which is also the venue for the club's home matches. This hall is nicknamed The Cauldron and was inaugurated in 1957. It has a capacity of 841 tiered seats, which can reach 1034 seats when floor arrangements are possible. The club played its first European Cup match against the Luxembourgers from Diekirch at the Lemouton gymnasium because the Jean Masson Hall was not approved.

On 2 December 2016, during a match between Chaumont and Montpellier, the municipality presented its project for a new multi-activity room scheduled for 2020 and accommodating 1700.

Since 2021, the club has been using the new Palestra sports complex, with a capacity of around 3,200 seats which meets the specifications set by the CEV for the Champions League. This complex emerged from the ground in 2021 allows the Chaumontais club to continue its development and evolve in modern infrastructures adapted to a high level. The CVB52HM won its first meeting and its first competition during the 2021 French SuperCoupe at the Palestra.
