= Esmoriz Ginásio Clube =

- Short name: Esmoriz GC
- Founded: 14 October 1967 (58 years ago)
- Ground: Pavilhão Esmoriz GC.
- Chairman: António Silva
- Manager: Bruno Lima
- League: A1 - Portugal
- 2015-16: 9th
- Website: Club home page

Uniforms
Home	Away

Esmoriz Ginásio Clube is a volleyball team based in Esmoriz, Portugal, that plays in the Portuguese first division.

== Achievements ==
- Portuguese Volleyball League A1: 2

1982/83, 1983/84

- Portuguese Volleyball Cup: 1

1981/82
