= S.C. Espinho (volleyball) =

Sporting Clube de Espinho
- Short name: SC Espinho
- Ground: Espinho, Portugal
- League: A1 - Portugal
- 2012–13 season: 2nd
- Website: Club home page

Uniforms
Home	Away

Sporting Clube de Espinho is a volleyball team based in Espinho, Portugal. It plays in the Portuguese Volleyball League A1.

== Honours ==
- Portuguese Volleyball League A1: 18

1956–57, 1958–59, 1960–61, 1962–63, 1964–65, 1984–85, 1986–87, 1994–95, 1995–96, 1996–97, 1997–98, 1998–99, 1999–00, 2005–06, 2006–07, 2008–09, 2009–10, 2011–12

- Portuguese Volleyball Cup: 12

1964–65, 1980–81, 1983–84, 1984–85, 1995–96, 1996–97, 1997–98, 1998–99, 1999–00, 2000–01, 2007–08, 2016–17

- Portuguese Volleyball Super Cup: 5

1994, 1996, 1997, 1999, 2017

- CEV Top Teams Cup: 1

2000–01 (runners-up: 2001–02)
