= Associação de Jovens da Fonte do Bastardo =

- Full name: Associação de Jovens da Fonte do Bastardo
- Short name: AJFB
- Nickname: Fonte do Bastardo
- Founded: 21 October 1975
- Ground: Complexo Desportivo Vitorino Nemésio (Capacity: 800)
- Chairman: Francisco Leonel Mendes Simões Ávila
- Manager: Nuno Abrantes
- Captain: Caíque Ferreira da Silva
- League: Portuguese Volleyball League A1
- 2021–22: 3rd
- Website: Club home page

Uniforms
Home	Away

Associação de Jovens da Fonte do Bastardo (Fonte do Bastardo Youth Association) is an athletic organization, in the civil parish of Fonte do Bastardo in the municipality of Praia da Vitória, island of Terceira in the Portuguese archipelago of the Azores. Its primary importance is in the professional volleyball; its team competes in Portuguese Men's A1 League, although other teams within the organization (which include Women's and Youth teams) participate in Futsal (indoor football).

== History ==
The association was founded on 21 October 1975, but was on officialized as of 2 November 1979. For the first 15 years of functioning the organization had its headquarters in the Casa do Povo of Fonte do Bastardo, until inauguration of its social headquarters on 21 October 2001, while the athletic association participated in national volleyball championships, rising eventually to the Carglass Division Major League.

Paulo Machado, Paulo Paiva, Fabiano Sousa, Diego Santos, Rui Lima, Manoel Filho, Leandro Terra, Wilson Pires (Toloba), Renato Santos (Zulu), André Sá, Miguel Pinheiro, Yuri Madeira, Januário Alvar, Rui Neves, Bruno Garcia, Alexandre Fagundes, Maurício Almeida and João Sousa, were the 18 athletes that allowed Fonte do Bastard team to reach the national level.

The municipal council of Praia da Vitória attributed a sporting medal of merit to the organization, marking its 25th anniversary and for its Azorean Senior Men's Championship in volleyball on 14 June 2001. It was during this season that Fonte do Bastard joined the 2nd Division at the national level. This was followed on 8 June 2005, with a similar medal of its A2 National Men's Senior Championship win, and its advance to the A1 Division of national volleyball.

Owing to its triumphs, the organization began playing their games from the municipal sporting pavilion in Fonte do Bastardo (Pavilhão Municipal Vitalino Fagundes) on 25 September 2005.

On 19 June 2011, the regional legislature of the Azores con-decorated the organization for its successes with public proclamation in the legislature, which was followed-up with the organization receiving the Autonomic Insignia of Civic Merit, during celebrations marking Azores Day (13 June 2011).

== Men's Standings ==
- 1999–2000 – Division A2 (Southern Zone)
- 2000–2001 – Division A2 (Southern Zone)
- 2001–2002 – Division A2 (Southern Zone)
- 2002–2003 – (2nd Place) Division A2 (Southern Zone); 2nd Place classification in the Division A2 (Northern Zone) and with two teams in Division A2, resulting in first place classification.
- 2003–2004 – (3rd Place) Division A2
- 2004–2005 – National Champion, Division A2; resulting in ascension to Division A1 status.
- 2005–2006 – (5th Place), Division A1
- 2006–2007 – (5th Place), Division A1
- 2007–2008 – (3rd Place), Division A1
- 2008–2009 – (4th Place), Division A1
- 2009–2010 – 5th Place, Division A1
- 2010–2011 – National Champion, Division A1
- 2011–2012 – 3rd Place, Division A1
- 2012–2013 – Champion, Portuguese Championship Cup; 3rd Place, Division A1
- 2013–2014 – 2nd Place, Division A1
- 2014–2015 – 2nd Place, Division A1
- 2015–2016 – National Champion, Division A1
- 2016–2017 – 3rd Place, Division A1
- 2017–2018 – 5th Place, Division A1
- 2018–2019 – 3rd Place, Division A1
- 2019–2020 – Cancelled through COVID-19 pandemic
- 2020–2021 – 2nd Place, Division A1
- 2021–2022 – 3rd Place, Division A1

== Players ==
2022–23 season

Number	Name	Nationality
1	Armando Velásquez	Ecuador
2	Federico Gómez	Argentina
4	Elder Spencer	Cape Verde
5	José Neves	Portugal
6	Bruno Cunha	Portugal
7	Dennis Del Valle	Puerto Rico
11	Antony Gabriel Gonçalves	Brazil
12	Rui Morreira	Portugal
13	Caíque Ferreira da Silva	Portugal
15	Matheus Faustino	Brazil
17	Bruno Felício de Jesus	Brazil
20	Gabriel Santos	Brazil

== Honours ==
- Portuguese Championship: 2

2010–11, 2015–16

- Portuguese Cup: 1

2012–13

- Portuguese Super Cup: 1

2022
