= Portugal men's national volleyball team =

Men's national volleyball team representing Portugal

Portugal
- Association: Federação Portuguesa de Voleibol
- Confederation: CEV
- Head coach: João José
- FIVB ranking: 25 (3 August 2026)

Uniforms
Home	Away	Third
- www.fpvoleibol.pt (in Portuguese)
Honours
Challenger Cup
Gold medal – first place	2018 Matosinhos	Team
European League
Gold medal – first place	2010 Guadalajara	Team
Silver medal – second place	2007 Portimão	Team
Bronze medal – third place	2009 Portimão	Team
Lusophony Games
Gold medal – first place	2006 Macau	Team
Gold medal – first place	2009 Lisbon	Team

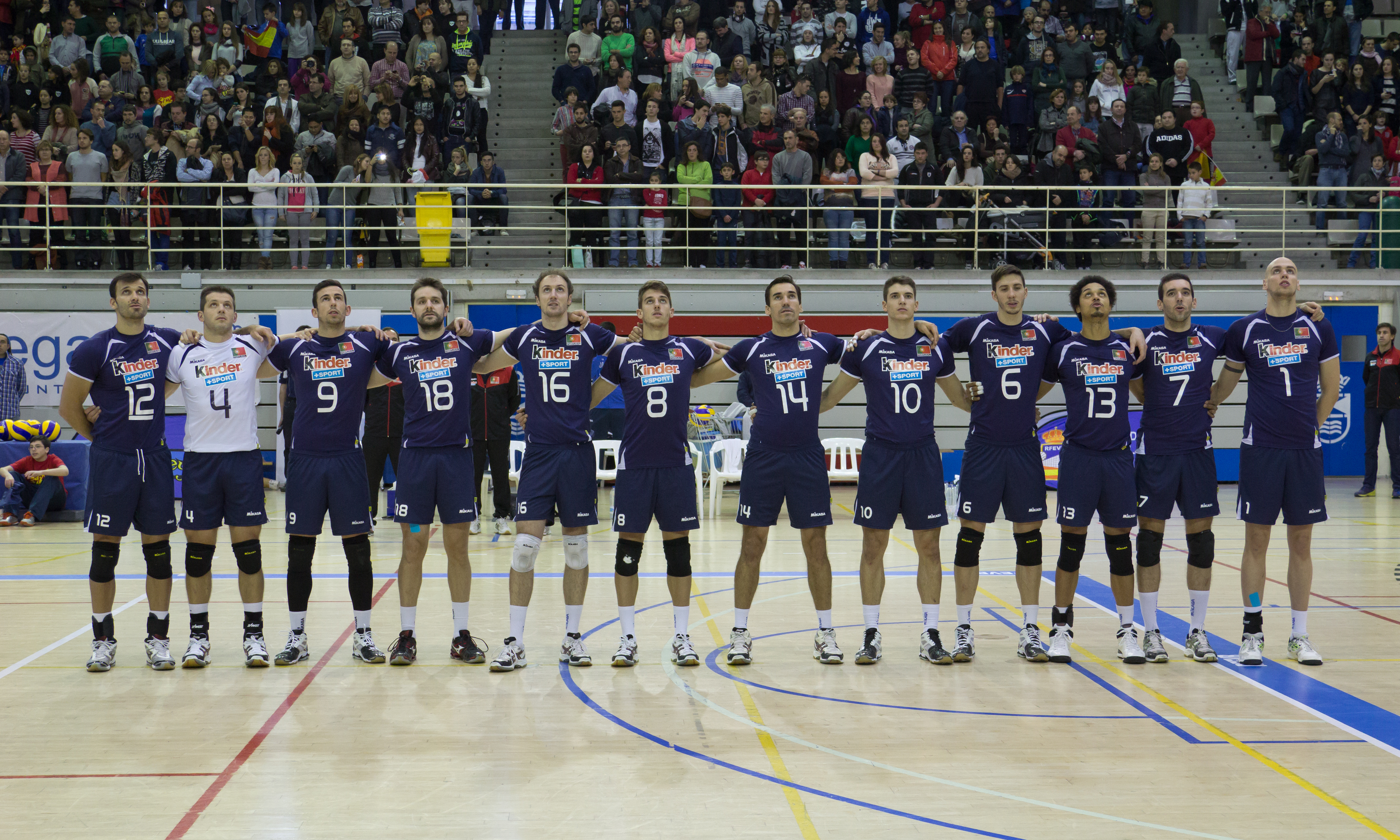
The Portugal national volleyball team in late 2013

The Portugal men's national volleyball team is the team representing Portugal in volleyball competitions. Their best results to date are winning the 2010 Men's European Volleyball League in Spain, the second place in the 2007 Men's European Volleyball League, 3rd at the 2009 Men's European Volleyball League, both tournaments hosted in Portugal, 4th in the 1948 Men's European Volleyball Championship in Italy, the 5th place at the 2005 FIVB World League in Serbia and Montenegro, 7th in the 1951 Men's European Volleyball Championship hosted in France and reaching the 8th place in the 2002 FIVB Men's World Championship in Argentina.

== Olympic Games ==
- 1964 – 2024 – did not qualify

== World Championship ==
- 1949 – 1952 – did not compete
- 1956 – 15th place
- 1960 – 1994 – did not compete
- 1998 – did not qualify
- 2002 – 8th place
- 2006 – 2022 – did not qualify
- 2025 – 16th place

== World Cup ==
- 1965 – 1977 – did not compete
- 1981 – 2019 – did not qualify

== World Grand Champions Cup ==
- 1993 – 2017 – did not compete

== World League ==
- 1990 – 1998 – did not compete
- 1999 – 10th place
- 2000 – did not compete
- 2001 – 13th place
- 2002 – 13th place
- 2003 – 13th place
- 2004 – 12th place
- 2005 – 5th place
- 2006 – 13th place
- 2007 – 2010 – did not compete
- 2011 – 14th place
- 2012 – 16th place
- 2013 – 17th place
- 2014 – 13th place
- 2015 – 18th place
- 2016 – 14th place
- 2017 – 22nd place

== Nations League ==
- 2018 – did not qualify
- 2019 – 15th place
- 2021 – did not qualify
- 2022 – did not qualify
- 2023 – did not qualify
- 2024 – did not qualify
- 2025 – did not qualify
- 2026 – did not qualify

== Challenger Cup ==
- 2018 – (gold) Gold medal
- 2019 – did not compete (Participated in VNL)
- 2022 – did not compete
- 2023 – did not qualify
- 2024 – did not qualify

== European Championship ==
- 1948 – 4th place
- 1950 – did not compete
- 1951 – 7th place
- 1955 – 1975 – did not compete
- 1977 – 2003 – did not qualify
- 2005 – 10th place
- 2007 – 2009 – did not qualify
- 2011 – 14th place
- 2013 – 2017 – did not qualify
- 2019 – 20th place
- 2021 – 15th place
- 2023 – 10th place
- 2026 – 16th place
- 2028 - To be determined

== European League ==
- 2004 – 2006 – did not compete
- 2007 – (silver) Silver medal
- 2008 – 8th place
- 2009 – (bronze) Bronze medal
- 2010 – (gold) Gold medal
- 2011 – 2017 – did not compete
- 2018 – 4th place
- 2019 – did not compete
- 2021 – 10th place
- 2022 – 5th place
- 2023 – 5th place
- 2024 – 8th place
- 2025 – 7th place
- 2026 – 12th place

== Current squad ==
The following is the Portuguese roster in the 2017 World League.

Head coach: João José

No.	Name	Date of birth	Height	Weight	Spike	Block	2024–25 club
1	Miguel Sinfrónio	18 March 1999	1.95 m (6 ft 5 in)	94 kg (207 lb)	338 cm (133 in)	318 cm (125 in)	(Germany) Helios Grizzlys Giesen
2	Simão Moreira	11 March 1998	1.80 m (5 ft 11 in)	65 kg (143 lb)	298 cm (117 in)	280 cm (110 in)	(Portugal) José Moreira
3	Afonso Guerreiro	28 December 1994	1.97 m (6 ft 6 in)	70 kg (150 lb)	319 cm (126 in)	300 cm (120 in)	(Portugal) Fonte do Bastardo
4	Filip Cveticanin	19 June 1996	1.99 m (6 ft 6 in)	90 kg (200 lb)	320 cm (130 in)	310 cm (120 in)	(Portugal) Castêlo da Maia
5	Marco Ferreira	4 October 1987	2.02 m (6 ft 8 in)	94 kg (207 lb)	359 cm (141 in)	337 cm (133 in)	(South Korea) Ansan OK Savings Bank
6	Alexandre Ferreira (C)	13 November 1991	2.02 m (6 ft 8 in)	87 kg (192 lb)	361 cm (142 in)	346 cm (136 in)	(Japan) Tokyo Great Bears
7	Ivo Casas	21 September 1992	1.80 m (5 ft 11 in)	71 kg (157 lb)	290 cm (110 in)	278 cm (109 in)	(Portugal) Benfica
8	Tiago Violas	27 March 1989	1.93 m (6 ft 4 in)	82 kg (181 lb)	326 cm (128 in)	303 cm (119 in)	(Portugal) Benfica
9	João Simões	11 June 1986	1.94 m (6 ft 4 in)	85 kg (187 lb)	325 cm (128 in)	315 cm (124 in)	(Portugal) Espinho
10	Phelipe Martins	2 March 1991	2.01 m (6 ft 7 in)	91 kg (201 lb)	307 cm (121 in)	289 cm (114 in)	(Portugal) Caldas
11	João Oliveira	31 July 1995	1.96 m (6 ft 5 in)	80 kg (180 lb)	330 cm (130 in)	318 cm (125 in)	(Portugal) Vitória
12	Lourenço Martins	30 April 1997	1.95 m (6 ft 5 in)	78 kg (172 lb)	308 cm (121 in)	298 cm (117 in)	(Portugal) Castêlo da Maia
13	Valdir Sequeira	22 November 1981	1.96 m (6 ft 5 in)	90 kg (200 lb)	360 cm (140 in)	348 cm (137 in)	(Slovakia) Prievidza
14	Bruno Cunha	18 August 1997	1.93 m (6 ft 4 in)	90 kg (200 lb)	320 cm (130 in)	308 cm (121 in)	(Portugal) Vitória
15	Miguel Tavares Rodrigues	2 March 1993	1.92 m (6 ft 4 in)	68 kg (150 lb)	315 cm (124 in)	293 cm (115 in)	(France) Tourcoing Lille Métropole
16	Manuel Meirinho	22 September 1999	2.04 m (6 ft 8 in)	97 kg (214 lb)	330 cm (130 in)	320 cm (130 in)	(Portugal) Bragança
17	João Fidalgo	2 November 1986	1.72 m (5 ft 8 in)	67 kg (148 lb)	307 cm (121 in)	285 cm (112 in)	(Portugal) São Mamede
18	Frederico Santos	16 September 1997	1.87 m (6 ft 2 in)	63 kg (139 lb)	314 cm (124 in)	296 cm (117 in)	(Portugal) São Mamede
