= Portuguese Volleyball Super Cup =

Supertaça de Portugal
- Sport: Volleyball
- Founded: 1990, 2009
- No. of teams: 2
- Country: Portugal
- Most recent champion: Sporting CP (6th Title)
- Most titles: Benfica (12)
- Website: www.fpvoleibol.pt/supertacadeportugal.php

The Portuguese Volleyball Super Cup or Supertaça de Portugal is an annual Portuguese volleyball competition played by the champions of the Campeonato Nacional de Voleibol and the winners of the Taça de Portugal de Voleibol. It is organized by the Federação Portuguesa de Voleibol and its first edition (won by Benfica) took place in 1990. Sporting CP won the next three, with Castêlo da Maia and Sporting de Espinho dominating the next eight years, winning four titles each. In 2002, the tournament was interrupted and only resumed in 2010, with Castêlo da Maia winning its fifth. From 2011 to 2016, Benfica won six Supertaças in a row, becoming the most honoured club in the competition, currently with 12 trophies. Sporting CP are the current holders winning the 2026 edition over Benfica, for their 6th Super Cup.

== History ==
The competition was created in 1989 by the Portuguese Volleyball Federation, to serve as "curtain-raiser" for the season, in similar fashion to what other Super cup's do. Its first winner was Leixões, the national and cup champions, completing a treble. The following year was won by Benfica, in an edition named Taça Federação, or Federation's Cup, played by multiple teams. The following three were won by Sporting CP and from then on, the Supertaça was only won by two clubs: Sporting de Espinho and Castêlo da Maia. They intercalated wins, and both bagged four wins each. In 2002 the competition stopped being contested and only returned in 2010 after a nine–year hiatus. On 5 October 2010, at the Pavilhão Municipal da Póvoa de Vazim, Castêlo da Maia and Sporting de Espinho decided who held the title as most honoured in the competition. The Maia-side won 3–1 and conquered their fifth Super cup, unlocking the tiebreaker.

Exactly one year later, Cup winners Benfica met débutantes Fonte Bastardo, the reigning league Champions on the Pavilhão do Casal Vistoso. The match ended with a win for Benfica, who lifted the trophy for the first time in 21 years. In the following year, Benfica faced Sporting de Espinho, a team that had beaten them five months before in the league final. On the hardwood, Benfica revenged that loss and won 3–0, lifting their third Super Cup. In the 15th edition, Benfica and Fonte Bastardo reunited in Pavilhão de Desportos de Vila do Conde to contest another Supertaça. In a much more exciting encounter than before, Benfica and Fonte Bastardo required five sets to decide the game, with Benfica winning the last one by 15–12. On 11 October 2014, Castêlo da Maia discussed the 16th edition with Benfica at the Pavilhão Multidesportos Mário Mexia in Coimbra. Castelo failed to defend their trophy lead in the competition and lost with Benfica; who subsequently matched them with five wins. A year later on 3 October 2015, Benfica won their fifth Super cup in a row, after defeating Sporting de Espinho by 3–0 in Coimbra. Hugo Gaspar scored 18 points and was the man of the match. In the 2016 edition, Benfica extended their streak to six wins, after beating Fonte Bastardo on Pavilhão Cidade de Viseu by 3–0. Benfica's streak ended in 2017 at Pavilhão Cidade de Almada with a 3–2 loss to Sporting de Espinho. On 5 October 2018, Benfica defeated Sporting by 3–0 to claim their eight Super Cup in Pavilhão Desportivo Póvoa de Varzim.

=== Winners ===
| Year | Sports hall | Final | | |
| Year | Sports hall | Winners | Score | Runners-up |
|---|---|---|---|---|
| 1989 (Note: Played over two legs) | | Leixões | 3–1 / 3–0 | Sporting CP |
| 1990 (Note: The competition was named Federation's Cup and was played by multiple teams.) | | Benfica | | |
| 1991 (Note: Played over two legs) | Pavilhão Borges Coutinho / Nave de Alvalade | Sporting CP | 3–1 / 3–1 | Benfica |
| 1992 (Note: Played over two legs) | Pavilhão Borges Coutinho / Nave de Alvalade | Sporting CP | 3–0 / 3–0 | Benfica |
| 1993 | Nave de Alvalade | Sporting CP | 3–1 | Nacional |
| 1994 | | Castêlo da Maia | 3–2 | Sporting CP |
| 1995 | | Sporting de Espinho | | |
| 1996 | | Castêlo da Maia | | Sporting de Espinho |
| 1997 | | Sporting de Espinho | | |
| 1998 | | Sporting de Espinho | | |
| 1999 | | Castêlo da Maia | | Sporting de Espinho |
| 2000 | | Sporting de Espinho | | |
| 2001 | | Castêlo da Maia | | Sporting de Espinho |
| 2010 | Municipal da Póvoa de Vazim | Castêlo da Maia | 3–1 | Sporting de Espinho |
| 2011 | Pavilhão do Casal Vistoso | Benfica | 3–0 | Fonte Bastardo |
| 2012 | Multidesportos Mário Mexia | Benfica | 3–0 | Sporting de Espinho |
| 2013 | Multidesportos Mário Mexia | Benfica | 3–2 | Fonte Bastardo |
| 2014 | Multidesportos Mário Mexia | Benfica | 3–0 | Castêlo da Maia |
| 2015 | Multidesportos Mário Mexia | Benfica | 3–0 | Sporting de Espinho |
| 2016 | Pavilhão Cidade de Viseu | Benfica | 3–0 | Fonte Bastardo |
| 2017 | Pavilhão Cidade de Almada | Sporting de Espinho | 3–2 | Benfica |
| 2018 | Pavilhão Póvoa de Varzim | Benfica | 3–0 | Sporting CP |
| 2019 | Pavilhão Cidade de Almada | Benfica | 3–0 | Fonte Bastardo |
| 2020 | Pavilhão Multiusos de Gondomar | Benfica | 3–0 | Sporting de Espinho |
| 2021 | Pavilhão Municipal de Santo Tirso | Benfica | 3–2 | Sporting CP |
| 2022 | | Fonte Bastardo | 3–1 | Benfica |
| 2023 | Pavilhão Municipal de Santo Tirso | Benfica | 3–0 | Fonte Bastardo |
| 2024 | Pavilhão Municipal de Santo Tirso | Sporting CP | 3–1 | Benfica |
| 2025 | Pavilhão Municipal de Loule | Sporting CP | 3–1 | Benfica |
| 2026 | Pavilhão Cidade de Viseu | Sporting CP | 3–0 | Benfica |

=== Performance by club ===
| Club | Winners | Runners-up | Years won | Years runner-up |
|---|---|---|---|---|
| Benfica | 12 | 7 | 1990, 2011, 2012, 2013, 2014, 2015, 2016, 2018, 2019, 2020, 2021, 2023 | 1991, 1992, 2017, 2022, 2024, 2025, 2026 |
| Sporting CP | 6 | 4 | 1991, 1992, 1993, 2024, 2025, 2026 | 1989, 1994, 2018, 2021 |
| Sporting de Espinho | 5 | 7 | 1995, 1997, 1998, 2000, 2017 | 1996, 1999, 2001, 2010, 2012, 2015, 2020 |
| Castêlo da Maia | 5 | 1 | 1994, 1996, 1999, 2001, 2010 | 2014 |
| Fonte Bastardo | 1 | 4 | 2022 | 2011, 2013, 2016, 2019 |
| Nacional | 0 | 1 | — | 1993 |
| Leixões | 1 | 0 | 1989 | — |
