= Portuguese Volleyball First Division =

Top men's volleyball league

- Current season, competition or edition: 2025–26 Portuguese Volleyball First Division
- Sport: Volleyball
- Founded: 1946
- No. of teams: 12
- Country: Portugal
- Confederation: CEV
- Most recent champions: Sporting CP (8th title)
- Most titles: SC Espinho (18 titles)
- Broadcasters: Benfica TV, Sport TV
- Level on pyramid: 1
- Relegation to: Second Division
- International cup: Challenge Cup
- Website: Federação Voleibol

The Portuguese Volleyball First Division (Portuguese: Campeonato Nacional de Voleibol – I Divisão) is the top men's volleyball league in Portugal. The competition, which is organised by the Portuguese Volleyball Federation, was called Honor Division (Divisão de Honra) in 1983–84 and 1986–88. Between 1997 and 2011, the League was divided into two different series, A1 and A2. Since the 2014–15 season, the competition's champions are called Elite Champions, while the First Division Champion title is disputed between the 4 losers of the play-off's first round. The current champions are Sporting CP, winning their eight title.

== List of champions ==
Portuguese Champions

- 1946–1947 : Instituto Superior Técnico
- 1947–1948 : Instituto Superior Técnico
- 1948–1949 : Instituto Superior Técnico
- 1949–1950 : Instituto Superior Técnico
- 1950–1951 : Instituto Superior Técnico
- 1951–1952 : Instituto Superior Técnico
- 1952–1953 : Instituto Superior Técnico
- 1953–1954 : Sporting CP
- 1954–1955 : Instituto Superior Técnico
- 1955–1956 : Sporting CP
- 1956–1957 : SC Espinho
- 1957–1958 : Instituto Superior Técnico
- 1958–1959 : SC Espinho
- 1959–1960 : Instituto Superior Técnico
- 1960–1961 : SC Espinho
- 1961–1962 : Lisboa e Ginásio
- 1962–1963 : SC Espinho
- 1963–1964 : Leixões SC
- 1964–1965 : SC Espinho
- 1965–1966 : Instituto Superior Técnico
- 1966–1967 : Instituto Superior Técnico
- 1967–1968 : Instituto Superior Técnico
- 1968–1969 : FC Porto
- 1969–1970 : FC Porto
- 1970–1971 : FC Porto

- 1971–1972 : Leixões SC
- 1972–1973 : FC Porto
- 1973–1974 : Leixões SC
- 1974–1975 : FC Porto
- 1975–1976 : Leixões SC
- 1976–1977 : FC Porto
- 1977–1978 : FC Porto
- 1978–1979 : Leixões SC
- 1979–1980 : Leixões SC
- 1980–1981 : S.L. Benfica
- 1981–1982 : Leixões SC
- 1982–1983 : Esmoriz
- 1983–1984 : Esmoriz
- 1984–1985 : SC Espinho
- 1985–1986 : FC Porto
- 1986–1987 : SC Espinho
- 1987–1988 : FC Porto
- 1988–1989 : Leixões SC
- 1989–1990 : AA Espinho
- 1990–1991 : S.L. Benfica
- 1991–1992 : Sporting CP
- 1992–1993 : Sporting CP
- 1993–1994 : Sporting CP
- 1994–1995 : SC Espinho
- 1995–1996 : SC Espinho
- 1996–1997 : SC Espinho

Portuguese League Champions – A1

- 1997–1998 : SC Espinho
- 1998–1999 : SC Espinho
- 1999–2000 : SC Espinho
- 2000–2001 : Castêlo da Maia
- 2001–2002 : Castêlo da Maia
- 2002–2003 : Castêlo da Maia
- 2003–2004 : Castêlo da Maia
- 2004–2005 : S.L. Benfica
- 2005–2006 : SC Espinho
- 2006–2007 : SC Espinho
- 2007–2008 : Vitória SC
- 2008–2009 : SC Espinho
- 2009–2010 : SC Espinho
- 2010–2011 : Fonte do Bastardo
- 2011–2012 : SC Espinho
- 2012–2013 : S.L. Benfica
- 2013–2014 : S.L. Benfica
- 2014–2015 : S.L. Benfica
- 2015–2016 : Fonte do Bastardo
- 2016–2017 : S.L. Benfica
- 2017–2018 : Sporting CP
- 2018–2019 : S.L. Benfica
- 2019–2020 : No champion (COVID-19 pandemic)
- 2020–2021 : S.L. Benfica
- 2021–2022 : S.L. Benfica
- 2022–2023 : S.L. Benfica
- 2023–2024 : S.L. Benfica
- 2024–2025 : Sporting CP
- 2025–2026 : Sporting CP

== Titles by club ==
Club	Won	Years won
SC Espinho	18	1957, 1959, 1961, 1963, 1965, 1985, 1987, 1995, 1996, 1997, 1998, 1999, 2000, 2006, 2007, 2009, 2010, 2012
Instituto Superior Técnico	13	1947, 1948, 1949, 1950, 1951, 1952, 1953, 1955, 1958, 1960, 1966, 1967, 1968
S.L. Benfica	12	1981, 1991, 2005, 2013, 2014, 2015, 2017, 2019, 2021, 2022, 2023, 2024
FC Porto	9	1969, 1970, 1971, 1973, 1975, 1977, 1978, 1986, 1988
Leixões SC	8	1964, 1972, 1974, 1976, 1979, 1980, 1982, 1989
Sporting CP	8	1954, 1956, 1992, 1993, 1994, 2018, 2025, 2026
Castêlo da Maia	4	2001, 2002, 2003, 2004
Esmoriz GC	2	1983, 1984
Fonte do Bastardo	2	2011, 2016
Lisboa GC	1	1962
AA Espinho	1	1990
Vitória de Guimarães	1	2008
