= Portuguese Volleyball Second Division =

- Founded: 1950
- Country: Portugal
- Confederation: CEV
- Number of clubs: 12
- Level on pyramid: 3
- Relegation to: Third Division
- Domestic cup(s): Portuguese Volleyball Cup; SuperCup
- Current champions: CA Madalena (6th title)
- Most championships: Lisboa GC (9)
- Website: http://www.fpvoleibol.pt
- Current: 2023-24

The Portuguese Volleyball Second Division is the second-level men's Volleyball League in Portugal, which is also called (Portuguese: "2a Divisão de Voleibol").

The competition is organized by the Federação Portuguesa de Voleibol.

== Portuguese 2nd Division Champions ==
Year	Final Standings
Year	Champion	Second Place	Third Place
1950/1951	Lisboa GC
1951/1952	Lisboa GC
1952/1953	SL Benfica
1953/1954	Lisboa GC
1954/1955	Lisboa GC
1955/1956	Lisboa GC
1956/1957	Lisboa GC
1957/1958	Lisboa GC
1958/1959	Sporting CP
1959/1960	Lisboa GC
1960/1961	Instituto Superior Tecnico
1961/1962	Leixões SC
1962/1963	Orfeão da Madalena
1963/1964	CD Fiães
1964/1965	FC Porto
1965/1966	CN Ginástica
1966/1967	Académica Coimbra
1967/1968	Lisboa GC
1968/1969	Académica Coimbra
1969/1970	CDUP
1970/1971	Académica Coimbra
1971/1972	Esmoriz GC
1972/1973	Académica Coimbra
1973/1974	Esmoriz GC
1974/1975	CD Póvoa
1975/1976	CH Carvalhos
1976/1977	AA São Mamede
1977/1978	CA Madalena
1978/1979	Académica Coimbra
1979/1980	CDUP
1980/1981	GD Quimigal
1981/1982	AA São Mamede
1982/1983	CA Madalena
1983/1984	CA Madalena
1984/1985	Sporting CP
1985/1986	CDUP
1986/1987	CA Madalena
1987/1988	AA Espinho
1988/1989	Associação Grundig
1989/1990	Castêlo da Maia GC
1990/1991	VCS Miguel
1991/1992	Universidade Lusiada
1992/1993	GDC Gueifães
1993/1994	Universidade Lusiada
1994/1995	CN Ginástica
1995/1996	GDC Gueifães
1996/1997	CS Maritimo
1997/1998	NV Est. Covilhã
1998/1999	Académica Coimbra
1999/2000	Vitória SC
2000/2001	CD Póvoa	SL Benfica B
2001/2002	AA Alunos	CDUP	CAIC Cernache
2002/2003	CD Ribeirense	SC Espinho B	CG Santo Tirso
2003/2004	Club K	CV Espinho	CG Santo Tirso
2004/2005	CF Aliança	CV Lisboa
2005/2006	Ala Nun'Alvares Gondomar	CV Oeiras
2006/2007	CV Espinho	SO Marinhense	Clube Ana
2007/2008	CD Póvoa	CA Madalena	AA Alunos
2008/2009	VC Viana	CA Madalena	ADRE Praiense
2009/2010	CD Marienses	Famalicense AC	AEIS Técnico
2010/2011	CD Póvoa	Famalicense AC	CN Ginástica
2011/2012	Clube Kairos	CV Oeiras
2012/2013	CA Madalena	CD Ribeirense
2013/2014	Leixões SC	CD Ribeirense
2014/2015	AA São Mamede	AA Alunos
2015/2016	VC Viana	Clube Kairos
2016/2017	Clube Kairos	GC Vilacondense
2017/2018	Famalicense AC	CA Madalena	CN Ginástica
2018/2019	CN Ginástica	CD Fiães	Benfica B
2019/2020	Season cancelled due to COVID-19 pandemic
2020/2021	AA Espinho	GC Santo Tirso	Marítimo SC
2021/2022	Ala Nun'Alvares Gondomar	CA Madalena	CV Oeiras
2022/2023	CV Oeiras	CA Madalena	CN Ginástica
2023/2024	CA Madalena	CN Ginástica	Sp. Caldas
