= Shainah Joseph =

Canadian national team volleyball player

Personal information
- Nationality: Canada
- Born: 15 May 1995 (age 31)
- Hometown: Ottawa, Ontario
- Height: 1.85 m (6 ft 1 in)
- Spike: 326 cm (128 in)
- Block: 310 cm (122 in)
- Education: University of Florida

Volleyball information
- Position: Opposite hitter
- Current club: FC Porto
- Number: 15

Career
Years	Teams
2014–2017	University of Florida
2017–2018	VC Maritza
2018–2019	Top Speed Taipei
2019–2020	Sta. Lucia Lady Realtors
2020–2021	Ageo Medics
2021–2022	Vandœuvre Nancy Volley-Ball
2022–2023	Volley Club Marcq-en-Barœul
2023–2024	Orlando Valkyries
2024–	FC Porto

National team
2015–2024	Canada
- Last updated: September 20, 2023

Shainah Joseph (born 15 May 1995) is a Canadian female volleyball player who currently plays for the FC Porto of the Portuguese Volleyball Federation. She is a member of the Canada women's national volleyball team and competed at the 2023 FIVB Volleyball Women's Olympic Qualification Tournaments.

== Early life and education ==
Joseph was born 15 May 1995 and grew up in Ottawa. After graduating from École secondaire catholique Franco-Cité, she attended the University of Florida, where she majored in telecommunications.

== College career ==
While studying at the University of Florida, Joseph played for the school's volleyball team. In 2017, she was named an All-SEC player, as well as to the American Volleyball Coaches Association All-America Second Team and VolleyballMag.com All-America Second Team.

== Club career ==
Joseph has played for VC Maritza in Bulgaria (2017–18), Top Speed in Taipei (18–19), Sta. Lucia Lady Realtors in the Philippines (2019–20), Ageo Medics in Japan (2020–21), Vandœuvre Nancy Volley-Ball in France (2021–22), and Volley Club Marcq-en-Barœul in France (2022–23). Beginning in 2023, she played for the Orlando Valkyries in the United States.

== International career ==
Joseph was selected to play for the Canadian Junior National Women's Volleyball team in 2012, then played for the women's national team from 2015 to 2017. All three years, she competed in the Women's Pan-American Volleyball Cup. She also competed in the FIVB Volleyball World Grand Prix in 2016 and 2018. In 2023, she competed at the FIVB Volleyball Women's Olympic Qualification Tournaments, where Canada came in third, just short of qualifying for the 2024 Summer Olympics.

== Honors ==
FC Porto

- Portuguese League: 2025/26
- Portuguese Cup: 2025/26
- Portuguese Super Cup: 2026
- Iberian Cup: 2024
