= Saška Đurović =

Montenegrin volleyball player (born 2001)

Personal information
- Born: 4 September 2001 (age 25); Podgorica, Montenegro
- Height: 1.88 m (6 ft 2 in)
- Spike: 300 cm (120 in)
- Block: 285 cm (112 in)

Volleyball information
- Position: Middle blocker
- Current club: FC Porto
- Number: 1

Career
Years	Teams
2015–2017; 2017–2022; 2022–2023; 2023–2024; 2024–2025; 2025–	ŽOK Morača; OK TENT; Saint-Raphaël Var Volley-Ball; Crvena Zvezda; Sporting CP; FC Porto

National team
Montenegro

Saška Đurović (born 4 September 2001) is a Montenegrin volleyball player. She plays as middle blocker for Portuguese club FC Porto.

== International career ==
She is a member of the Montenegro women's national volleyball team. She participated in the qualifications for the Women's European Volleyball Championship in 2019, 2021 and 2023.

== Awards ==
=== Club ===
OK Tent

- Serbian League: 2019/20

Sporting CP

- Portuguese Cup: 2024/25

FC Porto

- Portuguese League: 2025/26
- Portuguese Cup: 2025/26
- Portuguese Super Cup: 2026
