= A2 volleyball league (Portugal) =

- Founded: 1997
- Folded: 2012
- Country: Portugal
- Confederation: CEV
- Number of clubs: 12
- Level on pyramid: 2
- Relegation to: Second Division
- Domestic cup(s): Portuguese Volleyball Cup; SuperCup
- Last champions: Caldas Sport Clube (1st titles)
- Most championships: Club K (2); Caldas Sport Clube(2)
- Website: http://www.fpvoleibol.pt

The Portuguese Volleyball League A2 was the second men's Volleyball league in Portugal, which is also called (Portuguese: "Campeonato Nacional de Voleibol - A2"), until 2010/2011.

The competition was organized by the Federação Portuguesa de Voleibol and it was a closed competition, to gain promotion to A1 Volleyball League (Portugal) clubs must apply.

After the 2010/2011 season, The Portuguese Volleyball League A2 was cancelled, and Portuguese Volleyball Second Division become the second tier in Portuguese volleyball system.

== Portuguese League Champions - A2 ==
Year	Final
Year	Champion	Score	Runner-Up
1997/1998	AA São Mamede
1998/1999	CD Fiães
1999/2000	CS Marítimo
2000/2001	Vitoria SC
2001/2002	GC Vilacondense	group	GDC Gueifães
2002/2003	AA Alunos	3 - 1	CD Fiães
2003/2004	CD Ribeirense	3 - 1	GDC Gueifães
2004/2005	AJ Fonte Bastardo	3 - 0	CD Fiães
2005/2006	AD Machico
2006/2007	CN Ginástica
2007/2008	Club K
2008/2009	Caldas Sport Clube
2009/2010	Club K
2010/2011	Caldas Sport Clube
