= 2026 Women's European Volleyball Championship Pool D =

Volleyball tournament results

Pool D is one of four pools of the preliminary round of the 2026 Women's European Volleyball Championship. The pool consists of the Croatia, France, Italy, Montenegro, Slovakia, and co-hosts Sweden. All games were played at the Scandinavium in Gothenburg from 21 to 27 August 2026. The top four teams advanced to the final round. The winners in Gothenburg were the Italians who won all their games. France, co-hosts Sweden and Croatia also qualified for the last 16.

== Teams ==
| Team | Qualification method | Date of qualification | Appearance(s) | | | | Previous best performance (Note: Bold text indicates they hosted that edition.) | WR (Note: World ranking at start of tournament.) |
| Team | Qualification method | Date of qualification | Total | First | Last | Streak | Previous best performance | WR |
|---|---|---|---|---|---|---|---|---|
| France | Top eight in 2023 | 26 August 2023 | 19th | 1949 | 2023 | 4 | Fourth place (1951) | 15 |
| Italy | Top eight in 2023 | 26 August 2023 | 28th | 1951 | 2023 | 23 | Champions (2007, 2009, 2021) | 1 |
| Slovakia | Tenth in 2023 | 6 December 2023 | 7th | 2003 | 2023 | 4 | Twelfth place (2003, 2019) | 35 |
| Sweden | Host nation | 6 March 2024 | 6th | 1967 | 2023 | 3 | Eighth place (2021) | 21 |
| Montenegro | Pool D winner | 6 August 2025 | 1st | Debut | | | | 47 |
| Croatia | Pool G winner | 9 August 2025 | 16th | 1993 | 2023 | 11 | Runners-up (1995, 1997, 1999) | 40 |

== Venue ==
Scandinavium was chosen as Sweden's venue for Pool D. The facility has accommodated many prestigious European and world championships in many sports, including: Athletics, Aquatics, Figure Skating, Floorball, Handball, Ice Hockey and Tennis. It has also hosted the Eurovision Song Contest 1985.

| 2026 Women's European Volleyball Championship Pool D is located in Sweden | Gothenburg |
|---|---|
| 2026 Women's European Volleyball Championship Pool D is located in Sweden | Scandinavium |
| 2026 Women's European Volleyball Championship Pool D is located in Sweden | Capacity: 10,000 |

== Group standings ==
| Pos | Team | Pld | W | L | Pts | SW | SL | SR | SPW | SPL | SPR | Qualification |
|---|---|---|---|---|---|---|---|---|---|---|---|---|
| 1 | Italy | 5 | 5 | 0 | 15 | 15 | 1 | 15.000 | 394 | 304 | 1.296 | Final round |
| 2 | France | 5 | 4 | 1 | 12 | 13 | 4 | 3.250 | 405 | 351 | 1.154 | Final round |
| 3 | Sweden (H) | 5 | 3 | 2 | 7 | 10 | 10 | 1.000 | 439 | 423 | 1.038 | Final round |
| 4 | Croatia | 5 | 2 | 3 | 5 | 8 | 13 | 0.615 | 432 | 459 | 0.941 | Final round |
| 5 | Slovakia | 5 | 1 | 4 | 5 | 7 | 12 | 0.583 | 379 | 411 | 0.922 | |
| 6 | Montenegro | 5 | 0 | 5 | 1 | 2 | 15 | 0.133 | 307 | 408 | 0.752 | |

Source: CEV
(H) Host

=== Group progression ===
The table listed the results of teams in each round.

| Win | Loss |

| Team ╲ Round | 1 | 2 | 3 | 4 | 5 |
|---|---|---|---|---|---|
| Croatia | L | L | W | L | W |
| France | W | W | W | L | W |
| Italy | W | W | W | W | W |
| Montenegro | L | L | L | L | L |
| Slovakia | L | L | L | L | W |
| Sweden | W | W | L | W | L |

Source: CEV

=== Positions by round ===
The table listed the positions of teams in each round.

| Advance to the knockout stage |

| Team ╲ Round | 1 | 2 | 3 | 4 | 5 |
|---|---|---|---|---|---|
| Croatia | 4 | 5 | 4 | 5 | 4 |
| France | 1 | 2 | 1 | 2 | 2 |
| Italy | 2 | 1 | 2 | 1 | 1 |
| Montenegro | 5 | 6 | 6 | 6 | 6 |
| Slovakia | 6 | 4 | 5 | 4 | 5 |
| Sweden | 3 | 2 | 3 | 3 | 3 |

Source: CEV

== Matches ==
- All times are Central European Summer Time (UTC+02:00).

=== France vs Slovakia ===
| 21 August 2026; 13:00; Match duration: 1 hr 15 min | France | 3–0 | Slovakia | Scandinavium, Gothenburg; Attendance: 525; Referees: Raquel Portela (POR), Gregor Novak (SLO) |
| 21 August 2026; 13:00; Match duration: 1 hr 15 min | (25–13, 25–21, 25–13); Report | | | Scandinavium, Gothenburg; Attendance: 525; Referees: Raquel Portela (POR), Gregor Novak (SLO) |
| 21 August 2026; 13:00; Match duration: 1 hr 15 min | Scoring leaders | | | Scandinavium, Gothenburg; Attendance: 525; Referees: Raquel Portela (POR), Gregor Novak (SLO) |
| Depie 15 | | Total | Herdová 11 |
| Depie (14/31) | | Attack | Herdová (10/20) |
| three players 2 | | Block | Herdová, Hrušecká 1 |
| Danard-Selosse (2/15) | | Serve | Kohútová (0/0) |

=== Croatia vs Italy ===
| 21 August 2026; 16:00; Match duration: 1 hr 13 min | Croatia | 0–3 | Italy | Scandinavium, Gothenburg; Referees: Marko Oravainen (FIN), Jennifer Hesse (GER) |
| 21 August 2026; 16:00; Match duration: 1 hr 13 min | (9–25, 22–25, 23–25); Report | | | Scandinavium, Gothenburg; Referees: Marko Oravainen (FIN), Jennifer Hesse (GER) |
| 21 August 2026; 16:00; Match duration: 1 hr 13 min | Scoring leaders | | | Scandinavium, Gothenburg; Referees: Marko Oravainen (FIN), Jennifer Hesse (GER) |
| Grbavica 14 | | Total | Antropova 21 |
| Grbavica (12/32) | | Attack | Antropova (17/31) |
| Antunović, Butigan 1 | | Block | Danesi 3 |
| Butigan (3/13) | | Serve | Sylla (2/23) |

=== Sweden vs Montenegro ===
| 21 August 2026; 19:00; Match duration: 1 hr 21 min | Sweden | 3–0 | Montenegro | Scandinavium, Gothenburg; Attendance: 5,261; Referees: Marco van Zanten (NED), Raquel Portela (POR) |
| 21 August 2026; 19:00; Match duration: 1 hr 21 min | (25–13, 25–18, 25–23); Report | | | Scandinavium, Gothenburg; Attendance: 5,261; Referees: Marco van Zanten (NED), Raquel Portela (POR) |
| 21 August 2026; 19:00; Match duration: 1 hr 21 min | Scoring leaders | | | Scandinavium, Gothenburg; Attendance: 5,261; Referees: Marco van Zanten (NED), Raquel Portela (POR) |
| I. Haak 30 | | Total | Perović 13 |
| I. Haak (27/56) | | Attack | Perović (13/48) |
| three players 2 | | Block | Đurović 4 |
| I. Haak (2/14) | | Serve | Petranović (1/11) |

=== Italy vs Montenegro ===
| 22 August 2026; 15:00; Match duration: 1 hr 10 min | Italy | 3–0 | Montenegro | Scandinavium, Gothenburg; Attendance: 2,986; Referees: Gregor Novak (SLO), Marko Oravainen (FIN) |
| 22 August 2026; 15:00; Match duration: 1 hr 10 min | (25–13, 25–20, 25–19); Report | | | Scandinavium, Gothenburg; Attendance: 2,986; Referees: Gregor Novak (SLO), Marko Oravainen (FIN) |
| 22 August 2026; 15:00; Match duration: 1 hr 10 min | Scoring leaders | | | Scandinavium, Gothenburg; Attendance: 2,986; Referees: Gregor Novak (SLO), Marko Oravainen (FIN) |
| Antropova 13 | | Total | Đurović 13 |
| Egonu (11/22) | | Attack | Đurović (10/16) |
| Danesi 2 | | Block | three players 1 |
| Antropova (6/20) | | Serve | Đurović (2/12) |

=== Slovakia vs Sweden ===
| 22 August 2026; 18:00; Match duration: 2 hr 3 min | Slovakia | 2–3 | Sweden | Scandinavium, Gothenburg; Attendance: 6,220; Referees: Jennifer Hesse (GER), Marco van Zanten (NED) |
| 22 August 2026; 18:00; Match duration: 2 hr 3 min | (22–25, 16–25, 25–14, 25–22, 6–15); Report | | | Scandinavium, Gothenburg; Attendance: 6,220; Referees: Jennifer Hesse (GER), Marco van Zanten (NED) |
| 22 August 2026; 18:00; Match duration: 2 hr 3 min | Scoring leaders | | | Scandinavium, Gothenburg; Attendance: 6,220; Referees: Jennifer Hesse (GER), Marco van Zanten (NED) |
| Šunderlíková 26 | | Total | I. Haak 38 |
| Šunderlíková (25/51) | | Attack | I. Haak (35/63) |
| Šepeľová 2 | | Block | Andersson 5 |
| Körmendyová | | Serve | A. Haak, Julevik 2 |

=== France vs Croatia ===
| 23 August 2026; 15:00; Match duration: 1 hr 22 min | France | 3–0 | Croatia | Scandinavium, Gothenburg; Attendance: 3,261; Referees: Marko Oravainen (FIN), Gregor Novak (SLO) |
| 23 August 2026; 15:00; Match duration: 1 hr 22 min | (25–16, 25–17, 25–22); Report | | | Scandinavium, Gothenburg; Attendance: 3,261; Referees: Marko Oravainen (FIN), Gregor Novak (SLO) |
| 23 August 2026; 15:00; Match duration: 1 hr 22 min | Scoring leaders | | | Scandinavium, Gothenburg; Attendance: 3,261; Referees: Marko Oravainen (FIN), Gregor Novak (SLO) |
| Depie 19 | | Total | Fabris 10 |
| Depie (13/32) | | Attack | Fabris (10/26) |
| Depie 5 | | Block | Butigan 2 |
| five players 1 | | Serve | Grbavica (1/8) |

=== Sweden vs Italy ===
| 23 August 2026; 18:00; Match duration: 1 hr 15 min | Sweden | 0−3 | Italy | Scandinavium, Gothenburg; Attendance: 6,801; Referees: Raquel Portella (POR), Jennifer Hesse (GER) |
| 23 August 2026; 18:00; Match duration: 1 hr 15 min | (18−25, 23−25, 14−25); Report | | | Scandinavium, Gothenburg; Attendance: 6,801; Referees: Raquel Portella (POR), Jennifer Hesse (GER) |
| 23 August 2026; 18:00; Match duration: 1 hr 15 min | Scoring leaders | | | Scandinavium, Gothenburg; Attendance: 6,801; Referees: Raquel Portella (POR), Jennifer Hesse (GER) |
| I. Haak 15 | | Total | Antropova 18 |
| I. Haak (14/29) | | Attack | Antropova (14/27) |
| five players 1 | | Block | Fahr 5 |
| two players 1 | | Serve | Antropova (4/15) |

=== Croatia vs Slovakia ===
| 24 August 2026; 16:00; Match duration: 2 hr 19 min | Croatia | 3–2 | Slovakia | Scandinavium, Gothenburg; Attendance: 299; Referees: Marco van Zanten (NED), Raquel Portela (POR) |
| 24 August 2026; 16:00; Match duration: 2 hr 19 min | (25−27, 19−25, 25−21, 25−22, 15−11); Report | | | Scandinavium, Gothenburg; Attendance: 299; Referees: Marco van Zanten (NED), Raquel Portela (POR) |
| 24 August 2026; 16:00; Match duration: 2 hr 19 min | Scoring leaders | | | Scandinavium, Gothenburg; Attendance: 299; Referees: Marco van Zanten (NED), Raquel Portela (POR) |
| Fabris 27 | | Total | Šunderlíková 30 |
| Fabris (25/53) | | Attack | Šunderlíková (28/62) |
| Butigan, Trcol 3 | | Block | Hrušecká 4 |
| Antunović, Butigan 1 | | Serve | Fričová, Šunderlíková 2 |

=== Montenegro vs France ===
| 24 August 2026; 19:00; Match duration: 1 hr 18 min | Montenegro | 0–3 | France | Scandinavium, Gothenburg; Attendance: 360; Referees: Gregor Novak (SLO), Marko Oravainen (FIN) |
| 24 August 2026; 19:00; Match duration: 1 hr 18 min | (19–25, 22–25, 17–25); Report | | | Scandinavium, Gothenburg; Attendance: 360; Referees: Gregor Novak (SLO), Marko Oravainen (FIN) |
| 24 August 2026; 19:00; Match duration: 1 hr 18 min | Scoring leaders | | | Scandinavium, Gothenburg; Attendance: 360; Referees: Gregor Novak (SLO), Marko Oravainen (FIN) |
| Jovović 11 | | Total | Depie 19 |
| Perović (8/29) | | Attack | Depie (18/30) |
| Dragović, Jovović 3 | | Block | Sylves 6 |
| Perović (2/12) | | Serve | Danard-Selosse (3/17) |

=== Italy vs Slovakia ===
| 25 August 2026; 16:00; Match duration: 1 hr 15 min | Italy | 3–0 | Slovakia | Scandinavium, Gothenburg; Attendance: 1,261; Referees: Marko Oravainen (FIN), Marco van Zanten (NED) |
| 25 August 2026; 16:00; Match duration: 1 hr 15 min | (25–19, 25–18, 25–20); Report | | | Scandinavium, Gothenburg; Attendance: 1,261; Referees: Marko Oravainen (FIN), Marco van Zanten (NED) |
| 25 August 2026; 16:00; Match duration: 1 hr 15 min | Scoring leaders | | | Scandinavium, Gothenburg; Attendance: 1,261; Referees: Marko Oravainen (FIN), Marco van Zanten (NED) |
| Egonu 19 | | Total | Šepeľová 13 |
| Egonu (17/27) | | Attack | Šepeľová (11/26) |
| Fahr 4 | | Block | Kohútová, Šepeľová 1 |
| three players 1 | | Serve | Hrušecká, Šepeľová 1 |

=== Sweden vs Croatia ===
| 25 August 2026; 19:00; Match duration: 2 hr 11 min | Sweden | 3–2 | Croatia | Scandinavium, Gothenburg; Attendance: 3,871; Referees: Jennifer Hesse (GER), Raquel Portela (POR) |
| 25 August 2026; 19:00; Match duration: 2 hr 11 min | (16–25, 22–25, 25–19, 25–16, 23–21); Report | | | Scandinavium, Gothenburg; Attendance: 3,871; Referees: Jennifer Hesse (GER), Raquel Portela (POR) |
| 25 August 2026; 19:00; Match duration: 2 hr 11 min | Scoring leaders | | | Scandinavium, Gothenburg; Attendance: 3,871; Referees: Jennifer Hesse (GER), Raquel Portela (POR) |
| I. Haak 52 | | Total | Fabris 33 |
| I. Haak (47/83) | | Attack | Fabris (33/60) |
| Andersson 4 | | Block | Butigan, Strunjak 3 |
| I. Haak (3/24) | | Serve | Bečić, Trcol 1 |

=== France vs Italy ===
| 26 August 2026; 16:00; Match duration: 1 hr 57 min | France | 1–3 | Italy | Scandinavium, Gothenburg; Attendance: 863; Referees: Marco van Zanten (NED), Jennifer Hesse (GER) |
| 26 August 2026; 16:00; Match duration: 1 hr 57 min | (19–25, 25–19, 23–25, 19–25); Report | | | Scandinavium, Gothenburg; Attendance: 863; Referees: Marco van Zanten (NED), Jennifer Hesse (GER) |
| 26 August 2026; 16:00; Match duration: 1 hr 57 min | Scoring leaders | | | Scandinavium, Gothenburg; Attendance: 863; Referees: Marco van Zanten (NED), Jennifer Hesse (GER) |
| Depie 18 | | Total | Egonu 20 |
| Depie (17/51) | | Attack | Egonu (16/43) |
| Elouga 8 | | Block | Egonu 4 |
| | | Serve | three players 1 |

=== Slovakia vs Montenegro ===
| 26 August 2026; 19:00; Match duration: 1 hr 21 min | Slovakia | 3–0 | Montenegro | Scandinavium, Gothenburg; Attendance: 907; Referees: Gregor Novak (SLO), Marko Oravainen (FIN) |
| 26 August 2026; 19:00; Match duration: 1 hr 21 min | (25–21, 25–19, 25–11); Report | | | Scandinavium, Gothenburg; Attendance: 907; Referees: Gregor Novak (SLO), Marko Oravainen (FIN) |
| 26 August 2026; 19:00; Match duration: 1 hr 21 min | Scoring leaders | | | Scandinavium, Gothenburg; Attendance: 907; Referees: Gregor Novak (SLO), Marko Oravainen (FIN) |
| Šepeľová, Šunderlíková 18 | | Total | Perović 12 |
| Šunderlíková (17/37) | | Attack | Perović (12/35) |
| Körmendyová 3 | | Block | Đurović 3 |
| Šepeľová (2/15) | | Serve | Petranović (1/9) |

=== Croatia vs Montenegro ===
| 27 August 2026; 16:00; Match duration: 2 hr 0 min | Croatia | 3–2 | Montenegro | Scandinavium, Gothenburg; Attendance: 858; Referees: Jennifer Hesse (GER), Gregor Novak (SLO) |
| 27 August 2026; 16:00; Match duration: 2 hr 0 min | (21–25, 25–20, 22–25, 25–14, 15–8); Report | | | Scandinavium, Gothenburg; Attendance: 858; Referees: Jennifer Hesse (GER), Gregor Novak (SLO) |
| 27 August 2026; 16:00; Match duration: 2 hr 0 min | Scoring leaders | | | Scandinavium, Gothenburg; Attendance: 858; Referees: Jennifer Hesse (GER), Gregor Novak (SLO) |
| Butigan 20 | | Total | Perović 28 |
| Fabris, Grbavica (14/41) | | Attack | Perović (23/56) |
| Butigan 7 | | Block | Đurović 4 |
| Grbavica (3/21) | | Serve | Perović, Petranović 2 |

=== Sweden vs France ===
| 27 August 2026; 19:00; Match duration: 1 hr 55 min | Sweden | 1–3 | France | Scandinavium, Gothenburg; Attendance: 5,083; Referees: Raquel Portela (POR), Marco van Zanten (NED) |
| 27 August 2026; 19:00; Match duration: 1 hr 55 min | (26–28, 25–13, 20–25, 26–28); Report | | | Scandinavium, Gothenburg; Attendance: 5,083; Referees: Raquel Portela (POR), Marco van Zanten (NED) |
| 27 August 2026; 19:00; Match duration: 1 hr 55 min | Scoring leaders | | | Scandinavium, Gothenburg; Attendance: 5,083; Referees: Raquel Portela (POR), Marco van Zanten (NED) |
| I. Haak 39 | | Total | Depie 29 |
| I. Haak (35/66) | | Attack | Depie (28/48) |
| Andersson 4 | | Block | Elouga, Sylves 2 |
| I. Haak, Julevik 3 | | Serve | Ratahiry (3/17) |
