= Cansu Çetin =

Turkish volleyball player (born 1993)

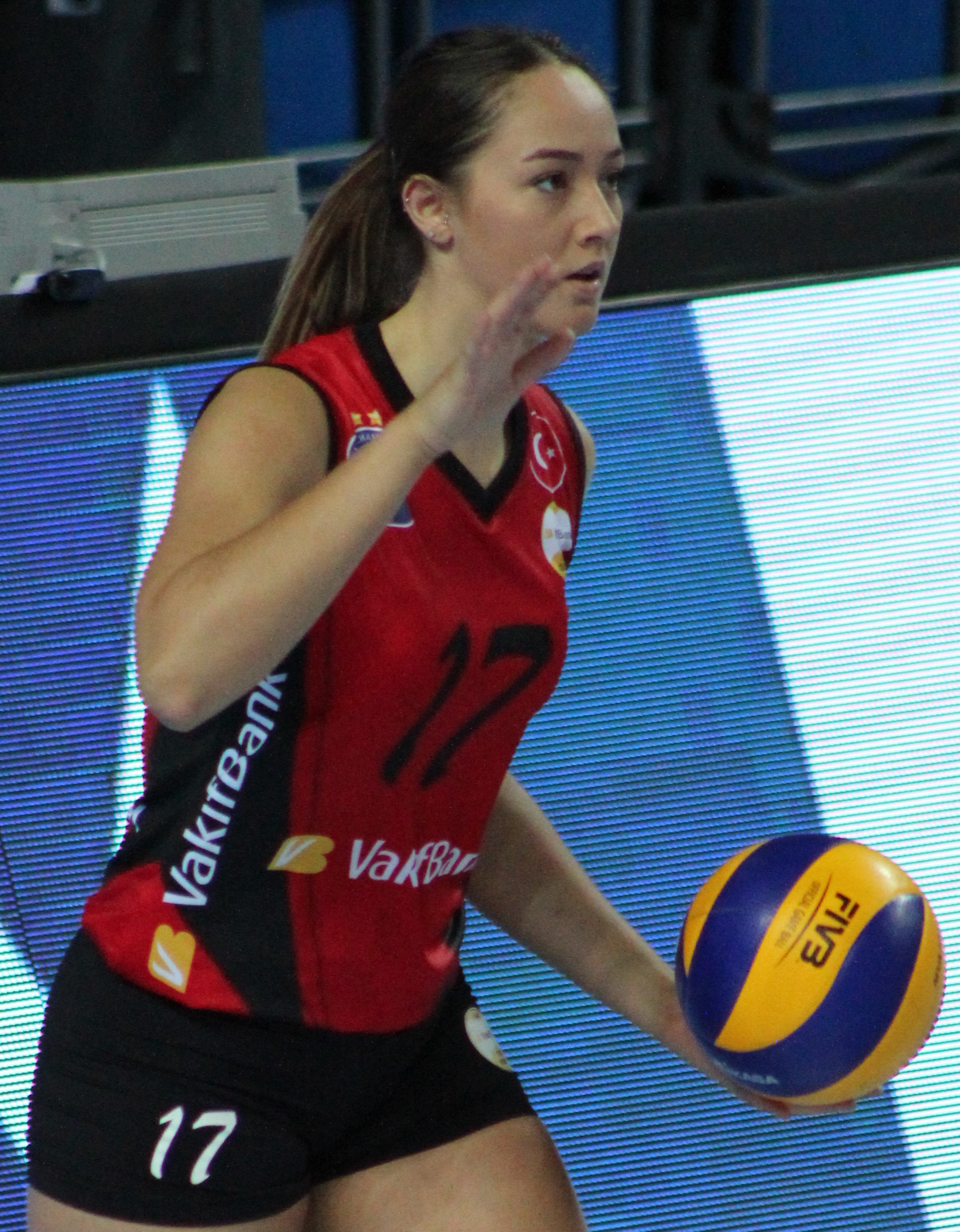

Personal information
- Born: 26 May 1993 (age 33); Ankara, Turkey
- Height: 1.83 m (6 ft 0 in)
- Weight: 69 kg (152 lb)
- Spike: 295 cm (116 in)
- Block: 285 cm (112 in)

Volleyball information
- Position: Outside Hitter
- Current club: SL Benfica
- Number: 7

Career
Years
- 2006–2007
- 2008–2010
- 2010–2011
- 2011–2014
- 2014–2015
- 2015–2017
- 2017–2020
- 2020–2024
- 2024–
Teams
- Çankaya Belediyespor
- İller Bankası
- Eczacıbaşı VitrA
- → Sarıyer Belediyesi (loan)
- → Beşiktaş (loan)
- VakıfBank S.K.
- Galatasaray HDI Sigorta
- Fenerbahçe Opet
- SL Benfica

National team
2014	Turkey
Honours
Women's volleyball
Representing Turkey
Women's European Volleyball League
Gold medal – first place	2014 Germany/Turkey	Team

Cansu Çetin (born 26 May 1993 in Ankara, Turkey) is a Turkish volleyball player for SL Benfica, The Last Champion of the Campeonato Nacional de Voleibol. She is 183 cm (6.00 ft) tall at 69 kg (152 lb).

== Personal life ==
After attending Ankara Esenevler Anadolu Highschool for three years, she continued at İstanbul Yeni Levent Highschool, where she graduated from. Currently, she is a student of psychology at Özyeğin University.

== Career ==
=== Clubs ===
Cansu Çetin began her sports career at the age of 13 in Çankaya Belediyespor in Ankara. Between 2008 and 2010, she played in the youth, junior and senior teams of İller Bankası. In 2010, she transferred to Eczacıbaşı VitrA. Her club loaned out her between 2011 and 2014 to Sarıyer Belediyesi, which became champion in the 2011–12 season, and was so promoted to Turkish Women's Volleyball League. For the 2014–15 season, she was loaned out to Yeşilyurt. She officially joined Fenerbahçe in August 2020.

=== National team ===
She was called up to the Turkey women's national volleyball team, and played at the 2014 Women's European Volleyball League that won the gold medal.

== Awards ==
=== Club ===
İller Bankası

- BVA Cup: (silver) 2010

Eczacıbaşı VitrA

- Turkish Women's Volleyball League: (bronze) 2010–11
- Turkish Cup: (gold) 2010–11
- Turkish Super Cup: (gold) 2011

Sarıyer Belediyesi

- Turkish Women's Volleyball League 2: (gold) 2011–12

VakıfBank

- FIVB Volleyball Women's Club World Championship: (gold) 2017 (bronze) 2016
- CEV Champions League: (gold) 2016–17 (silver) 2015–16
- Turkish Women's Volleyball League: (gold) 2016

Galatasaray HDI Sigorta

- Turkish Women's Volleyball League: (bronze) 2017–18, 2018–19

Fenerbahçe Opet

- FIVB Volleyball Women's Club World Championship: (bronze) 2021
- CEV Champions League: (bronze) 2021–22, 2022-23
- Turkish Women's Volleyball League: (gold) 2022–23, 2023–24 (silver) 2020-21, 2021-22
- Turkish Cup: (gold) 2022–23 (silver) 2021–22, 2022–23
- Turkish Super Cup: (gold) 2022 (silver) 2023

SL Benfica

- Portuguese Volleyball League: (gold) 2024–25
- Portuguese Super Cup: (gold) 2024, 2025

=== National team ===
- 2014 Women's European Volleyball League - (gold) champion

== See also ==
- Turkish women in sports
