= Rodrigo Pernambuco =

Portuguese volleyball player (born 1996)

Personal information
- Full name: Rodrigo Roberto Melo
- Born: October 16, 1996 (age 30); Brazil
- Height: 1.93 m (6 ft 4 in)
- Weight: 81 kg (179 lb)

Volleyball information
- Position: Opposite
- Current club: 2020-2021 Urbia Voley Palma (Portugal) Sporting CP
- Number: 13

Career
Years	Teams
2015-2017; 2018-2019; 2019-	(Brazil) ADC São Bernardo (Portugal) SC Espinho (Portugal) Sporting CP

Rodrigo Pernambuco (born October 16, 1996) is a Brazilian volleyball player who plays for Sporting CP.
