= Vitória S.C. (volleyball) =

Volleyball team based in Guimarães, Portugal

Vitória Sport Clube
- Nickname: Vitória de Guimarães
- Founded: 1976 (50 years ago) (women's); 1998 (28 years ago) (men's)
- Ground: Guimarães, Portugal; Pavilhão Desportivo Unidade Vimaranense (Capacity: 2,500)
- Chairman: Rui Rodrigues
- Manager: Nuno Pereira (men's); Hélder Andrade (women's)
- League: Portuguese First Division; Women's First Division
- 2023-24: 6th (men's); 5th (women's)
- Website: vitoriasc.pt/modalidades-voleibol/

Uniforms
Home	Away

Vitória Sport Clube is a Portuguese sports club in the city of Guimarães, where different sports are practiced. This article is about its professional volleyball section, whose senior men's and women's teams compete, respectively, in the Portuguese Volleyball First Division and the Women's Volleyball First Division, both of which are the main levels of the sport in Portugal.

The teams, from youth to senior level, train and play their games in the Vimaranense Unit Sports Pavilion, which is located in the Vitória SC Academy.

== History ==
Vitória SC opened the doors of Guimarães to volleyball in 1947 by forming a men's team to play a match against Académico de Braga, in what was the first demonstration of volleyball in the city. Of all the sports, it was through volleyball that some of the prejudices against women's sport that affected society at the time were overcome. As a result, at the beginning of the 1960s, with the sport being adopted by other teams in Portugal, it was possible to form the first women's volleyball championship.

It was in 1962 that Vitória SC, along with other clubs, made its debut in official competitions. However, it wasn't until 1976 that women's volleyball team became a permanent part of Vitória Sport Clube's history. The following decade was an extremely successful one, with the team making its way up through the top flight, making five consecutive appearances in European competitions.

However, in 1987 Vitória stopped taking part in the national volleyball championship, declaring the women's team extinct due to financial difficulties and a lack of proper infrastructure.

Nevertheless, after a decade, in 1998, Vitória SC formed a senior team again and began competing in national competitions, winning the Second Division in 2006/07 and entering the top tier of Portuguese volleyball in 2020/21. They have won one more title so far in 2023/24, the Federation Cup 3–2 against SL Benfica.

It was also in 1998 that the men's volleyball team was founded, and in just three seasons they reached the First Division in 2000/01. Their success was such that during their first 9 seasons in the top flight, Vitória's worst finish was 4th place. During that time, they were also national champions in 2007/08, won the Portuguese Cup in 2008/09 (beating SC Espinho 3–2) and made several excellent appearances in European competitions. They would later win the Federation Cup in 2018/19, beating AJ Fonte do Bastardo 2–0, after finishing runners-up in 2016/17.

== Men's Achievements ==
Portuguese Volleyball League A1: 1

- 2007/08

Portuguese Volleyball League A2: 1

- 2000/01

Portuguese Volleyball Cup: 1

- 2008/09

Federation Cup: 1

- 2018/19

Portuguese Volleyball Second Division: 1

- 1999/00

Total Trophies: 5 Nationals

Portuguese Volleyball Third Division: 1

- 2010/11 (Vitória SC B)

== Current Squad 2021-22 Men's ==
No.	Nationality	Player	Position
15	Portugal	Francisco Pombeiro	Setter
19	Portugal	Pedro Albuquerque	Setter
16	Portugal	João Lanhas	Libero
18	Brazil	Miguel Henriques	Libero
4	Brazil	Allan Guimarães	Middle blocker
9	Portugal	Carlos Fidalgo	Middle blocker
14	Brazil	Garça	Middle blocker
2	Brazil	Leonam Domingues	opposite
6	Portugal	Francisco Fabião	opposite
7	Portugal	João Oliveira	Opposite hitter
8	Portugal	Junio Pinheiro	Opposite hitter
10	Portugal	Rui Moreira	Outside hitter
11	Portugal	Miguel Cunha	Outside hitter
13	Portugal	Diogo Santos	Outside hitter
17	Portugal	Rodrigo Pereira	Outside hitter

== Women's Achievements ==
Portuguese Women's Volleyball Second Division: 2

- 1980/81, 2006/07

Federation Cup: 1

- 2023/24

Total Trophies: 3 Nationals

== Current Squad 2021-22 Women's ==
No.	Nationality	Player	Position
2	Portugal	Mariana Freitas	Setter
3	Brazil	Marina Scherer	Setter
9	Portugal	Margarida Valentim	Setter
7	Portugal	Joana Bragança	Libero
13	Portugal	Márcia Costa	Libero
17	Portugal	Mariana Pinto	Libero
5	Portugal	Margarida Fernandes	Middle blocker
8	Portugal	Marta Araújo	Middle blocker
14	Brazil	Beatriz Machado	Middle blocker
22	Brazil	Simone Scherer	Middle blocker
23	Portugal	Rita Novais	Opposite
6	Portugal	Isabel Castro	Outside hitter
10	Brazil	Nayara Ferreira	Outside hitter
11	Portugal	Bruna Rosa	Outside hitter
16	Portugal	Bruna Moura	Outside hitter
18	Brazil	Juliana Souza Silva	Opposite hitter
