= Portuguese Women's Volleyball Super Cup =

Women's Volleyball Super Cup (Portugal)
- Sport: Volleyball
- First season: 1989
- Administrator: FPV
- No. of teams: 2
- Country: Portugal
- Most recent champion: FC Porto (2026)
- Most titles: Castêlo da Maia GC (6 title)
- Website: Portuguese Volleyball Federation

The Portuguese Women's Volleyball Super Cup (Portuguese: Supertaça de Portugal de Voleibol Feminino) is the women's volleyball competition which consists of a match played by the champion of the National Championship and the winner of the National Cup. In case the same club wins both (Championship and Cup) during the same season, the National Cup runner-up is selected to be the opponent at the Super Cup. It is organized and administrated by the Portuguese Volleyball Federation (FPV) and the first edition (won by Leixões SC) took place in 1989. The tournament was not held from 2002 until 2014, returning in 2015. Castêlo da Maia GC is the most successful club in the competition, having won the title in six occasions. The current holders are FC Porto.

== Results ==
Year	Final
Year	Champion	Result	Runner-up
1989	Leixões SC		CR Estrelas da Avenida
1990	CR Estrelas da Avenida		Boavista FC
1991	CR Estrelas da Avenida		Leixões SC
1992	Leixões SC		Boavista FC
1993	Boavista FC		Sporting CP
1994	Boavista FC		Castêlo da Maia GC
1995	Castêlo da Maia GC		Boavista FC
1996	Castêlo da Maia GC		CS Madeira
1997	Castêlo da Maia GC		Boavista FC
1998	Castêlo da Maia GC		CS Madeira
1999	Castêlo da Maia GC		Boavista FC
2000	Castêlo da Maia GC		CS Madeira
2001	Boavista FC		Castêlo da Maia GC
2002–2014	Not held
2015	AVC Famalicão	3–0 (25–21, 25–17, 25–21)	Porto Vólei 2014
2016	Porto Vólei 2014	3–0 (25–21, 25–18, 25–20)	AVC Famalicão
2017	Leixões SC	3–1 (15–25, 25–18, 25–22, 25–22); Report	AVC Famalicão
2018	Leixões SC	3–0 (25–15, 25–10, 25–12); Report	Porto Vólei 2014
2019	AJM/FC Porto	3–2 (27–29, 23–25, 25–17, 25–16, 15–6)	Leixões SC
2020	AJM/FC Porto	3–0 (25–17, 25–12, 25–15)	Porto Vólei 2014
2021	AJM/FC Porto	3–0 (25–21, 25–20, 25–13)	Leixões SC
2022	AJM/FC Porto	3–2 (25–21, 24–26, 16–25, 32–30, 15–12)	Leixões SC
2023	Leixões SC	3–0 (25–17, 25–21, 26–24)	Sporting CP
2024	Benfica	3–1 (16–25, 25–19, 25–23, 25–15)	FC Porto
2025	Benfica	3–0 (25–21, 25–14, 25–18)	Sporting CP
2026	FC Porto	3–1 (25–18, 23–25, 25–17, 25–20)	SC Braga

== Titles by club ==
Club	Winners	Runners-up	Years won	Years runner-up
Castêlo da Maia GC	6	2	1995, 1996, 1997, 1998, 1999, 2000	1994, 2001
Leixões SC	5	4	1989, 1992, 2017, 2018, 2023	1991, 2019, 2021, 2022
AA José Moreira/FC Porto	5	1	2019, 2020, 2021, 2022, 2026	2024
Boavista FC	3	5	1993, 1994, 2001	1990, 1992, 1995, 1997, 1999
CR Estrelas da Avenida	2	1	1990, 1991	1989
Benfica	2	0	2024, 2025	
Porto Volei	1	3	2016	2015, 2018, 2020
Sporting CP	1	3	1987	1993, 2023, 2025
AVC Famalicão	1	1	2015	2016, 2017
CS Madeira	0	3	–	1996, 1998, 2000
SC Braga	0	1	–	2026
