= 2026–27 CEV Women's Champions League qualification =

Volleyball qualifier

The 2026–27 CEV Women's Champions League qualification was played between 20 October and 11 November 2026. Eight teams registered for these qualification rounds of the 2026–27 CEV Women's Champions League. Two of the teams joined the eighteen teams already qualified for the league round. The six eliminated teams competed in the 2026–27 CEV Cup.

== Teams ==
Teams from national federations ranked 10th or lower had to play the qualifying rounds.

Rank	Country	Points	Qualified team
10	Bulgaria	80.67	Maritza Plovdiv
11	Slovenia	77.66	OTP Banka Branik Maribor
13	Spain	67.33	Fundación Cajasol Andalucía
14	Croatia	56.67	Mladost Zagreb
15	Belgium	55.33	Asterix Avo Beveren
18	Portugal	23.67	FC Porto
19	Montenegro	23.33	OK Herceg Novi
N/A	Azerbaijan	0.00	Turan Tovuz

== Bracket ==
The drawing of lots was held on 15 July 2026 in Luxembourg City.

Second round
(Portugal) FC Porto	3	3
(Spain) Fundación Cajasol Andalucía	1	0
(Belgium) Asterix Avo Beveren	3	1	15
(Slovenia) OTP Banka Branik Maribor	0	3	6
(Azerbaijan) Turan Tovuz	3	3
(Croatia) Mladost Zagreb	0	2
(Montenegro) OK Herceg Novi	0	2
(Bulgaria) Maritza Plovdiv	3	3

Third round
(Portugal) FC Porto	3	1	12
(Belgium) Asterix Avo Beveren	1	3	15
(Azerbaijan) Turan Tovuz	3	3
(Bulgaria) Maritza Plovdiv	0	0

== Second round ==
- The winners of the ties qualify for the third round.
- In case the teams are tied after two legs, a Golden Set is played immediately at the completion of the second leg.
- All times are local.

Team 1	Agg.	Team 2	1st leg	2nd leg	Golden Set
FC Porto (Portugal)	2–0	(Spain) Fundación Cajasol Andalucía	3–1	3–0	
Asterix Avo Beveren (Belgium)	1–1	(Slovenia) OTP Banka Branik Maribor	3–0	1–3	15–6
Turan Tovuz (Azerbaijan)	2–0	(Croatia) Mladost Zagreb	3–0	3–2	
OK Herceg Novi (Montenegro)	0–2	(Bulgaria) Maritza Plovdiv	0–3	2–3	

=== First leg ===
Date	Time		Score		Set 1	Set 2	Set 3	Set 4	Set 5	Total	Report
22 Oct	20:00	FC Porto (Portugal)	3–1	(Spain) Fundación Cajasol Andalucía	23–25	29–27	25–22	25–21		102–95	Report
21 Oct	19:30	Asterix Avo Beveren (Belgium)	3–0	(Slovenia) OTP Banka Branik Maribor	26–24	25–18	25–12			76–54	Report
20 Oct	19:00	Turan Tovuz (Azerbaijan)	3–0	(Croatia) Mladost Zagreb	25–20	25–16	25–16			75–52	Report
21 Oct	19:00	OK Herceg Novi (Montenegro)	0–3	(Bulgaria) Maritza Plovdiv	13–25	23–25	20–25			56–75	Report

=== Second leg ===
Date	Time		Score		Set 1	Set 2	Set 3	Set 4	Set 5	Total	Report
28 Oct	19:00	Fundación Cajasol Andalucía (Spain)	0–3	(Portugal) FC Porto	18–25	16–25	24–26			58–76	Report
29 Oct	19:00	OTP Banka Branik Maribor (Slovenia)	3–1	(Belgium) Asterix Avo Beveren	25–20	25–11	20–25	25–22		95–78	Report
Golden set		OTP Banka Branik Maribor (Slovenia)	6–15	(Belgium) Asterix Avo Beveren							
29 Oct	20:00	Mladost Zagreb (Croatia)	2–3	(Azerbaijan) Turan Tovuz	22–25	25–21	23–25	25–23	13–15	108–109	Report
28 Oct	18:30	Maritza Plovdiv (Bulgaria)	3–2	(Montenegro) OK Herceg Novi	28–30	25–20	25–18	23–25	15–10	116–103	Report

== Third round ==
- The winners of the ties qualify for the league round (fourth round).
- In case the teams are tied after two legs, a Golden Set is played immediately at the completion of the second leg.
- All times are local.

Team 1	Agg.	Team 2	1st leg	2nd leg	Golden Set
FC Porto (Portugal)	1–1	(Belgium) Asterix Avo Beveren	3–1	1–3	12–15
Turan Tovuz (Azerbaijan)	2–0	(Bulgaria) Maritza Plovdiv	3–0	3–0	

=== First leg ===
Date	Time		Score		Set 1	Set 2	Set 3	Set 4	Set 5	Total	Report
5 Nov	20:00	FC Porto (Portugal)	3–1	(Belgium) Asterix Avo Beveren	19–25	25–14	27–25	25–22		96–86	Report
3 Nov	18:30	Maritza Plovdiv (Bulgaria)	0–3	(Azerbaijan) Turan Tovuz	22–25	22–25	20–25			64–75	Report

=== Second leg ===
Date	Time		Score		Set 1	Set 2	Set 3	Set 4	Set 5	Total	Report
11 Nov	18:00	Asterix Avo Beveren (Belgium)	3–1	(Portugal) FC Porto	25–18	18–25	25–22	25–23		93–88	Report
Golden set		Asterix Avo Beveren (Belgium)	15–12	(Portugal) FC Porto							
10 Nov	18:00	Turan Tovuz (Azerbaijan)	3–0	(Bulgaria) Maritza Plovdiv	25–22	25–17	25–23			75–62	Report

== Final standings ==
Winners of the 3rd round	Losers of the 3rd round	Losers of the 2nd round
(Azerbaijan) Turan Tovuz	(Portugal) FC Porto	(Slovenia) OTP Banka Branik Maribor
(Belgium) Asterix Avo Beveren	(Bulgaria) Maritza Plovdiv	(Croatia) Mladost Zagreb
		(Montenegro) OK Herceg Novi
		(Spain) Fundación Cajasol Andalucía

Qualified for 2026–27 CEV Champions League
Qualified for 2026–27 CEV Cup
