= 2005–06 in Portuguese rink hockey =

In 2005–06, FC Porto won the Championship for the 5th time in a row with 10 points of advantage over the runners-up S.L. Benfica. FC Porto also won the Portuguese Cup, playing in the final with Juventude de Viana and winning 7-4 and the Portuguese SuperCup, winning against Benfica in a two-legged final. These competitions are organized by Federação Portuguesa de Patinagem. In the European competitions, FC Porto was the runner up on the Champions League.

== Domestic Club Competitions ==
=== The Championship ===
The Rink Hockey Portuguese Championship in 2005-06 had 14 teams participating and was divided in 2 phases. In the first, every team played each other, each team making 26 games. A win as awarded 3 points, a draw 1 point and a loss 0 points. After the 1st phase, the points of all teams were divided in half (if 21, then 21/2 = 10,5 = 11) and the championship was divided into 2 groups: A and B. The Group A had the 6 best teams in the 1st phase fighting for the title. Group B had the other 8 teams fighting to avoid relegation.

FC Porto was the champion for the 5th time in a row.

==== 1st Phase Table ====
1st Phase Table for the Rink Hockey Portuguese Championship 2005-06 Season
	Team	P	Pts	1/2
1	FC Porto	26	65	33
2	SL Benfica	26	55	28
3	OC Barcelos	26	53	27
4	AJ Viana	26	44	22
5	UD Oliveirense	26	41	21
6	Candelária SC	26	39	20
7	ACR Gulpilhares	26	39	20
8	CD Portossantense	26	34	17
9	CD Paço d'Arcos	26	31	16
10	Famalicense AC	26	28	14
11	CD Nortecoope	26	24	12
12	S Alenquer B	26	24	12
13	HC Braga	26	21	11
14	HA Cambra	26	18	9

P= Games Played Pts= Points Pts= Points divided by Half

==== 2nd Phase - Group A ====
2nd Phase Table -Group A
	Team	P	SP	Pts
1	FC Porto	10	33	61
2	SL Benfica	10	28	50
3	OC Barcelos	10	27	40
4	AJ Viana	10	22	35
5	UD Oliveirense	10	21	33
6	Candelária SC	10	20	20

P = Games Played SP = Starting Points Pts = Points

Qualifying for European Competitions 2006/07

The top two clubes from the championship and the Portuguese Cup winner would get a spot at the European Champions League. The next three clubs in the table would get a spot in CERS Cup. As FC Porto won the Cup and had a right to a spot for finishing 1st, one spot for the European Champions League has been given to OC Barcelos and a CERS Cup spot has been given to Candelária SC.

==== 2nd Phase - Group B ====
2nd Phase Table -Group B
	Team	P	SP	Pts
7	ACR Gulpilhares	14	20	43
8	CD Portossantense	14	17	40
9	CD Paço Arcos	14	16	35
10	HA Cambra	14	9	33
11	HC Braga	14	11	33
12	S Alenquer B	14	12	30
13	CD Nortecoope	14	12	28
14	Famalicense AC	14	14	22

HC Braga, S Alenquer B, CD Nortecoope and Famalicense AC are relegated to 2nd Division. AD Valongo, J Ouriense, AE Física D and HC Sintra are promoted from the 2nd division to the 1st.

=== Portuguese Cup ===
==== Round of 16 to Final ====
Round of 16
3	UF Entroncamento	2
1	AJ Viana	10
3	Biblioteca IR	1
1	S Alenquer B	6
2	Académico FC	8
2	AA Amadora	3
2	GDS Cascais	8
1	Famalicense AC	6
2	HC Turquel	2
1	FC Porto	9
1	ACR Gulpilhares	4
1	UD Oliveirense	3
1	SL Benfica	2
1	CD Portosantense	0
2	GD Sesimbra	4
2	HC Mealhada	3

Quarter-Finals
1	S Alenquer B	1
1	AJ Viana	6
2	GDS Cascais	1
2	Académico FC	2
1	ACR Gulpilhares	2
1	FC Porto	7
2	GD Sesimbra	0
1	SL Benfica	2

Semi-Finals
1	AJ Viana	8
2	Académico FC	3
1	SL Benfica	6
1	FC Porto	7

Final
1	FC Porto	7
1	AJ Viana	4

Numbers behind the teams indicate their division.

The Final-Four games (semifinals and final) were played on 17 and 18 June 2006 in Mealhada.

=== Portuguese SuperCup ===
Date	Home			Away
1 Nov 05	SL Benfica	2	2	FC Porto
5 Nov 05	FC Porto	5	2	SL Benfica
TOTAL:	FC Porto	7	4	SL Benfica

== European Club Competitions ==
=== European Champions League ===
==== 1st Round ====
	Home			Away
1st leg	La Vendeenne	1	5	FC Porto
2nd leg	FC Porto	5	0	La Vendeenne
Total	FC Porto	10	1	La Vendeenne

==== Group stage ====
Group A

Team	G	W	D	L	GF	GA	Pts
Follonica H	6	5	1	0	34	17	16
FC Porto	6	3	2	1	32	16	11
Bassano H	6	2	1	3	28	18	7
SC Thunerstern	6	0	0	6	11	54	0

Date	Home			Away
07 Jan	Follonica H	12	3	SC Thunerstern
07 Jan	FC Porto	3	2	Bassano H
21 Jan	SC Thunerstern	2	7	FC Porto
21 Jan	Bassano H	2	3	Follonica H
04 Feb	SC Thunerstern	0	7	Bassano H
04 Feb	Follonica H	3	2	FC Porto
18 Feb	SC Thunerstern	4	7	Follonica H
18 Feb	Bassano H	3	2	FC Porto
04 Mar	FC Porto	11	0	SC Thunerstern
04 Mar	Follonica H	5	2	Bassano H
18 Mar	Bassano H	10	2	SC Thunerstern
18 Mar	FC Porto	4	4	Follonica H

==== Final four ====
Team	G	W	L	GF	GA	Pts
Follonica H	3	3	0	16	9	9
FC Porto	3	2	1	12	13	6
Reus D	3	1	2	8	7	3
CE Noia	3	0	3	4	11	0

Date	Home			Away
5 May	FC Porto	4	9	Follonica H
5 May	Reus D	3	0	CE Noia
6 May	Follonica H	3	2	Reus D
6 May	CE Noia	1	4	FC Porto
04 Feb	FC Porto	4	3	Reus D
04 Feb	Follonica H	4	3	CE Noia

Follonica is European Champion, Porto is runner-up.

=== Cers Cup ===
Only CD Portosantense participated in this competition: other Portuguese teams who had the chance declined, claiming financial reasons.

==== Round of 16 ====
	Home			Away
1st leg	CD Portosantense	3	5	H Novara
2nd leg	H Novara	4	2	CD Portosantense
Total	CD Portosantense	5	9	H Novara

== National team ==
=== 2006 European Championship ===
The Portuguese National team played the Rink Hockey European Championship in Monza, Italy from 16 to 22 July 2006. Portugal ended the competition in the 3rd place.

==== Squad ====
Name	Position	Club
Carlos Silva	Goalkeeper	SL Benfica
João Pereira (Ginho)	Goalkeeper	OC Barcelos
Sérgio Silva	Defender	Follonica H
Valter Neves	Defender	SL Benfica
Tiago Rafael	Defender	OC Barcelos
Pedro Moreira	Defender	FC Porto
Vítor Hugo	Forward	ACR Gulpilhares
Ricardo Barreiros	Forward	SL Benfica
Jorge Silva	Forward	FC Porto
Reinaldo Ventura	Forward	FC Porto

==== Phase I ====
Team	G	W	D	L	GF	GA	Dif	Pts
Portugal	2	2	0	0	10	0	+10	6
Switzerland	2	1	0	1	4	9	-5	3
Andorra	2	0	0	2	2	7	-5	0

17 July 2006
21:30

Portugal	3–0	Andorra
Valter Neves - 7'; Reinaldo Ventura - 16'; Jorge Silva - 33'	(Report)

Referee: SORENSEN, ANTON (Netherlands)

18 July 2006
21:30

Switzerland	0–7	Portugal
	(Report)	Sérgio Silva - 14', 20'; Ricardo Barreiros - 18'; Jorge Silva - 30', 36'; Vítor Hugo - 38'; Reinaldo Ventura - 39'

Referee: FERMI, GIANNI (Italy)

19 July 2006
21:30

Switzerland	4–2	Andorra
Michael Muller - 3', 8'; Florian Brentini - 21'; Gael Jimenez - 34'	(Report)	Marc Montardit - 35'; Ramon Bassols - 39'

Referee: BISACCO, ALBERTO (Italy)

==== Knockout Phase ====
===== Bracket =====
Quarter-finals
20 July - 21.30
Portugal	24
Austria	0
20 July - 17.30
Spain	10
Germany	0
20 July - 19.30
Italy	11
Andorra	1
20 July - 15.30
France	3
Switzerland	4

Semi-finals
21 July - 18.30
Portugal	1
Spain	5
21 July - 21.15
Italy	2(3)
Switzerland (PEN)	2(5)

Final
22 July - 21.30
Spain	2
Switzerland	0
Third place
22 July - 18.30
Portugal	5
Italy	4

===== Quarterfinals =====
20 July 2006
21:30

Portugal	24–0	Austria
Tiago Rafael - 0', 18'; Jorge Silva - 1', 7', 31'; Reinaldo Ventura - 2', 22', 26', 27'; Sérgio Silva - 7', 11'; Ricardo Barreiros - 11', 11', 16', 16', 36', 38'; Vítor Hugo - 17', 28', 34', 35'; Pedro Moreira - 27', 29'; Valter Neves - 33'	(Report)

Referee: GALAN, XAVIER (Spain)

===== Semifinals =====
21 July 2006
18:30

Portugal	1–5	Spain
Reinaldo Ventura - 33'	(Report)	Josep Maria Ordeig - 20'; Sergi Panadero - 24'; Marc Gual - 26', 30'; Pedro Gil - 36'

Referee: FERMI, GIANNI (Italy)

===== 3rd Place Game =====
22 July 2006
18:30

Portugal	5–4	Italy
Sérgio Silva - 6', 32'; Ricardo Barreiros - 17'; Vítor Hugo - 24', 33'		Davide Motaran - 5'; Francesco Dolce - 25', 26'; Mattia Cocco - 37'

Referee: ARMATI, ENRICO (Switzerland)
