= 2026–27 Women's CEV Cup =

European volleyball tournament

- League: Women's CEV Cup
- Sport: Volleyball
- Duration: 24 November 2026 – 7 April 2027
- Matches: 62
- Teams: 32

Women's CEV Cup seasons
- ← 2025–26 2027–28 →

The 2026–27 Women's CEV Cup is the 55th edition of the European CEV Cup volleyball club tournament organised by the European Volleyball Confederation.

== Format ==
The CEV Cup is played in a knockout format. Each team plays a home and an away match. The team that wins both matches advances to the next round. If the teams win one match each, a Golden Set is played immediately at the completion of the second leg. The Golden Set winner is the team that first obtains 15 points, provided that the points difference between the two teams is at least 2 points (thus, the Golden Set is similar to a tiebreak set in a regular match).

Main phase (Home and away matches):

- 16th finals → 8th finals → Playoffs → Quarterfinals

Final phase (Home and away matches):

- Semifinals → Finals

== Participating teams ==
32 teams participate in the 2026–27 edition of the tournament. 22 teams were allocated direct slots in the 16th finals and 6 teams joined via the 2026–27 CEV Champions League qualification. In the quarterfinals the 2nd to 5th ranked third placed teams from the league round of the 2026–27 CEV Champions League will join the competition (4 teams).

Rank	Country	No. of teams	Teams
1	Italy	1	Reale Mutua Fenera Chieri '76 (Note: Chieri '76 replaced Igor Gorgonzola Novara, which received a wild card to the 2026–27 CEV Champions League.)
2	Romania	2	CS Volei Alba Blaj, Dinamo București
3	France	2	RC Cannes, Vandœuvre Nancy VB
4	Turkey	1	Zeren SK Ankara
5	Greece	1	GS Panionios Nea Smyrni
6	Germany	2	Allianz MTV Stuttgart, SSC Palmberg Schwerin
7	Poland	1	BKS ZGO Bielsko-Biała
8	Serbia	2	Crvena Zvezda Beograd, ŽOK Ub
9	Switzerland	1	Viteos Neuchatel UC
10	Spain	3	Emalsa Gran Canaria, Fundación Cajasol Andalucía (Note: Relegated from the qualification rounds of the 2026–27 CEV Champions League.), Heidelberg Gran Canaria
11	Czech Republic	2	Dukla Liberec, TJ Sokol Frýdek-Místek
12	Hungary	2	Békéscsaba, KHG KNRC Kaposvár
13	Belgium	1	VC Oudegem
14	Portugal	1	FC Porto
15	Croatia	2	Mladost Zagreb, ŽOK Ribola Kaštela
19	Slovenia	1	OTP Banka Branik Maribor
20	Finland	1	Gebwell Puijo Wolley Kuopio
21	Bulgaria	1	Maritza Plovdiv
25	Montenegro	1	OK Herceg Novi
?	(N/A)	1	2nd Ranked 3rd CL Team (Note: Relegated from the league round of the 2026–27 CEV Champions League.)
?	(N/A)	1	3rd Ranked 3rd CL Team
?	(N/A)	1	4th Ranked 3rd CL Team
?	(N/A)	1	5th Ranked 3rd CL Team

== Bracket ==
The drawing of lots was held on 15 July 2026 in Luxembourg City.

16th finals
(Serbia) Crvena Zvezda
(Czech Republic) Dukla Liberec
(Hungary) KNRC Kaposvár
(Germany) MTV Stuttgart
(Bulgaria) Maritza Plovdiv
(Croatia) ŽOK Ribola Kaštela
(Slovenia) OTP Banka Branik
(France) Vandœuvre Nancy
(Germany) SSC P. Schwerin
(Spain) Heidelberg
(Finland) Puijo Wolley
(Poland) BKS Bielsko-Biała
(Croatia) Mladost Zagreb
(Romania) Dinamo București
(N/A) Bye	–	–
(Romania) Volei Alba Blaj	–	–
(Czech Republic) TJ Sokol Frýdek-M.
(Hungary) Békéscsaba
(N/A) Bye	–	–
(Greece) GS Panionios	–	–
(Spain) Emalsa Gran Can.
(Belgium) VC Oudegem
(Montenegro) OK Herceg Novi
(Turkey) Zeren SK Ankara
(Spain) Fund. Cajasol
(Switzerland) Neuchatel UC
(Portugal) FC Porto
(Serbia) ŽOK Ub
(N/A) Bye	–	–
(France) RC Cannes	–	–
(N/A) Bye	–	–
(Italy) Chieri '76	–	–

8th finals
(Romania) Volei Alba Blaj
(Greece) GS Panionios
(France) RC Cannes
(Italy) Chieri '76

Playoffs

Quarterfinals
3rd Ranked 3rd CL Team
4th Ranked 3rd CL Team
2nd Ranked 3rd CL Team
5th Ranked 3rd CL Team

Semifinals

Finals

== Main phase ==
=== 16th finals ===
- The winners of the ties qualify for the 8th finals.
- In case the teams are tied after two legs, a Golden Set is played immediately at the completion of the second leg.
- All times are local.

Team 1	Agg.	Team 2	1st leg	2nd leg
Crvena Zvezda Beograd (Serbia)	–	(Czech Republic) Dukla Liberec	–	–
KHG KNRC Kaposvár (Hungary)	–	(Germany) Allianz MTV Stuttgart	–	–
Maritza Plovdiv (Bulgaria)	–	(Croatia) ŽOK Ribola Kaštela	–	–
OTP Banka Branik Maribor (Slovenia)	–	(France) Vandœuvre Nancy VB	–	–
SSC Palmberg Schwerin (Germany)	–	(Spain) Heidelberg Gran Canaria	–	–
Gebwell Puijo Wolley Kuopio (Finland)	–	(Poland) BKS ZGO Bielsko-Biała	–	–
Mladost Zagreb (Croatia)	–	(Romania) Dinamo București	–	–
	Bye	(Romania) CS Volei Alba Blaj	–	–
TJ Sokol Frýdek-Místek (Czech Republic)	–	(Hungary) Békéscsaba	–	–
	Bye	(Greece) GS Panionios Nea Smyrni	–	–
Emalsa Gran Canaria (Spain)	–	(Belgium) VC Oudegem	–	–
OK Herceg Novi (Montenegro)	–	(Turkey) Zeren SK Ankara	–	–
Fundación Cajasol Andalucía (Spain)	–	(Switzerland) Viteos Neuchatel UC	–	–
FC Porto (Portugal)	–	(Serbia) ŽOK Ub	–	–
	Bye	(France) RC Cannes	–	–
	Bye	(Italy) Reale Mutua Fenera Chieri '76	–	–

==== First leg ====
Date	Time		Score		Set 1	Set 2	Set 3	Set 4	Set 5	Total	Report
24 Nov	19:00	Crvena Zvezda Beograd (Serbia)	–	(Czech Republic) Dukla Liberec	–	–	–			0–0	Report
25 Nov	18:00	KHG KNRC Kaposvár (Hungary)	–	(Germany) Allianz MTV Stuttgart	–	–	–			0–0	Report
24 Nov	19:00	ŽOK Ribola Kaštela (Croatia)	–	(Bulgaria) Maritza Plovdiv	–	–	–			0–0	Report
25 Nov	18:00	OTP Banka Branik Maribor (Slovenia)	–	(France) Vandœuvre Nancy VB	–	–	–			0–0	Report
25 Nov	18:00	SSC Palmberg Schwerin (Germany)	–	(Spain) Heidelberg Gran Canaria	–	–	–			0–0	Report
25 Nov	18:00	Gebwell Puijo Wolley Kuopio (Finland)	–	(Poland) BKS ZGO Bielsko-Biała	–	–	–			0–0	Report
25 Nov	19:00	Mladost Zagreb (Croatia)	–	(Romania) Dinamo București	–	–	–			0–0	Report
25 Nov	18:00	TJ Sokol Frýdek-Místek (Czech Republic)	–	(Hungary) Békéscsaba	–	–	–			0–0	Report
25 Nov	19:00	Emalsa Gran Canaria (Spain)	–	(Belgium) VC Oudegem	–	–	–			0–0	Report
24 Nov	19:00	OK Herceg Novi (Montenegro)	–	(Turkey) Zeren SK Ankara	–	–	–			0–0	Report
25 Nov	19:30	Fundación Cajasol Andalucía (Spain)	–	(Switzerland) Viteos Neuchatel UC	–	–	–			0–0	Report
25 Nov	20:00	FC Porto (Portugal)	–	(Serbia) ŽOK Ub	–	–	–			0–0	Report

==== Second leg ====
Date	Time		Score		Set 1	Set 2	Set 3	Set 4	Set 5	Total	Report
2 Dec	18:00	Dukla Liberec (Czech Republic)	–	(Serbia) Crvena Zvezda Beograd	–	–	–			0–0	Report
3 Dec	19:00	Allianz MTV Stuttgart (Germany)	–	(Hungary) KHG KNRC Kaposvár	–	–	–			0–0	Report
2 Dec	18:30	Maritza Plovdiv (Bulgaria)	–	(Croatia) ŽOK Ribola Kaštela	–	–	–			0–0	Report
2 Dec	20:00	Vandœuvre Nancy VB (France)	–	(Slovenia) OTP Banka Branik Maribor	–	–	–			0–0	Report
2 Dec	19:30	Heidelberg Gran Canaria (Spain)	–	(Germany) SSC Palmberg Schwerin	–	–	–			0–0	Report
3 Dec	18:00	BKS ZGO Bielsko-Biała (Poland)	–	(Finland) Gebwell Puijo Wolley Kuopio	–	–	–			0–0	Report
2 Dec	18:00	Dinamo București (Romania)	–	(Croatia) Mladost Zagreb	–	–	–			0–0	Report
3 Dec	18:00	Békéscsaba (Hungary)	–	(Czech Republic) TJ Sokol Frýdek-Místek	–	–	–			0–0	Report
2 Dec	20:00	VC Oudegem (Belgium)	–	(Spain) Emalsa Gran Canaria	–	–	–			0–0	Report
3 Dec	18:00	Zeren SK Ankara (Turkey)	–	(Montenegro) OK Herceg Novi	–	–	–			0–0	Report
2 Dec	20:00	Viteos Neuchatel UC (Switzerland)	–	(Spain) Fundación Cajasol Andalucía	–	–	–			0–0	Report
1 Dec	19:00	ŽOK Ub (Serbia)	–	(Portugal) FC Porto	–	–	–			0–0	Report

=== 8th finals ===
- The winners of the ties qualify for the playoffs.
- In case the teams are tied after two legs, a Golden Set is played immediately at the completion of the second leg.
- All times are local.

Team 1	Agg.	Team 2	1st leg	2nd leg
	–		–	–
	–		–	–
	–		–	–
	–	(Romania) CS Volei Alba Blaj	–	–
	–	(Greece) GS Panionios Nea Smyrni	–	–
	–		–	–
	–		–	–
RC Cannes (France)	–	(Italy) Reale Mutua Fenera Chieri '76	–	–

==== First leg ====
Date	Time		Score		Set 1	Set 2	Set 3	Set 4	Set 5	Total	Report
15–17 Dec			–		–	–	–			0–0	Report
15–17 Dec			–		–	–	–			0–0	Report
15–17 Dec			–		–	–	–			0–0	Report
15–17 Dec			–	(Romania) CS Volei Alba Blaj	–	–	–			0–0	Report
15–17 Dec			–	(Greece) GS Panionios Nea Smyrni	–	–	–			0–0	Report
15–17 Dec			–		–	–	–			0–0	Report
15–17 Dec			–		–	–	–			0–0	Report
16 Dec	20:00	RC Cannes (France)	–	(Italy) Reale Mutua Fenera Chieri '76	–	–	–			0–0	Report

==== Second leg ====
Date	Time		Score		Set 1	Set 2	Set 3	Set 4	Set 5	Total	Report
12–14 Jan			–		–	–	–			0–0	Report
12–14 Jan			–		–	–	–			0–0	Report
12–14 Jan			–		–	–	–			0–0	Report
12 Jan	18:00	CS Volei Alba Blaj (Romania)	–		–	–	–			0–0	Report
12 Jan	20:00	GS Panionios Nea Smyrni (Greece)	–		–	–	–			0–0	Report
12–14 Jan			–		–	–	–			0–0	Report
12–14 Jan			–		–	–	–			0–0	Report
13 Jan	20:00	Reale Mutua Fenera Chieri '76 (Italy)	–	(France) RC Cannes	–	–	–			0–0	Report

=== Playoffs ===
- The winners of the ties qualify for the quarterfinals.
- In case the teams are tied after two legs, a Golden Set is played immediately at the completion of the second leg.
- All times are local.

Team 1	Agg.	Team 2	1st leg	2nd leg
	–		–	–
	–		–	–
	–		–	–
	–		–	–

==== First leg ====
Date	Time	Score	Set 1	Set 2	Set 3	Set 4	Set 5	Total	Report
26–28 Jan		–	–	–	–			0–0	Report
26–28 Jan		–	–	–	–			0–0	Report
26–28 Jan		–	–	–	–			0–0	Report
26–28 Jan		–	–	–	–			0–0	Report

==== Second leg ====
Date	Time	Score	Set 1	Set 2	Set 3	Set 4	Set 5	Total	Report
2–4 Feb		–	–	–	–			0–0	Report
2–4 Feb		–	–	–	–			0–0	Report
2–4 Feb		–	–	–	–			0–0	Report
2–4 Feb		–	–	–	–			0–0	Report

=== Quarterfinals ===
- The four winners of the playoffs face the 2nd to 5th ranked third placed teams from the league round of the 2026–27 CEV Champions League.
- The winners of the ties qualify for the semifinals.
- In case the teams are tied after two legs, a Golden Set is played immediately at the completion of the second leg.
- All times are local.

Team 1	Agg.	Team 2	1st leg	2nd leg
3rd Ranked 3rd CL Team	–		–	–
4th Ranked 3rd CL Team	–		–	–
2nd Ranked 3rd CL Team	–		–	–
5th Ranked 3rd CL Team	–		–	–

==== First leg ====
Date	Time		Score	Set 1	Set 2	Set 3	Set 4	Set 5	Total	Report
16–18 Feb		3rd Ranked 3rd CL Team	–	–	–	–			0–0	Report
16–18 Feb		4th Ranked 3rd CL Team	–	–	–	–			0–0	Report
16–18 Feb		2nd Ranked 3rd CL Team	–	–	–	–			0–0	Report
16–18 Feb		5th Ranked 3rd CL Team	–	–	–	–			0–0	Report

==== Second leg ====
Date	Time	Score		Set 1	Set 2	Set 3	Set 4	Set 5	Total	Report
23–25 Feb		–	3rd Ranked 3rd CL Team	–	–	–			0–0	Report
23–25 Feb		–	4th Ranked 3rd CL Team	–	–	–			0–0	Report
23–25 Feb		–	2nd Ranked 3rd CL Team	–	–	–			0–0	Report
23–25 Feb		–	5th Ranked 3rd CL Team	–	–	–			0–0	Report

== Final phase ==
=== Semifinals ===
- The winners of the ties qualify for the finals.
- In case the teams are tied after two legs, a Golden Set is played immediately at the completion of the second leg.
- All times are local.

Team 1	Agg.	Team 2	1st leg	2nd leg
	–		–	–
	–		–	–

==== First leg ====
Date	Time	Score	Set 1	Set 2	Set 3	Set 4	Set 5	Total	Report
9–11 Mar		–	–	–	–			0–0	Report
9–11 Mar		–	–	–	–			0–0	Report

==== Second leg ====
Date	Time	Score	Set 1	Set 2	Set 3	Set 4	Set 5	Total	Report
16–18 Mar		–	–	–	–			0–0	Report
16–18 Mar		–	–	–	–			0–0	Report

=== Finals ===
- In case the teams are tied after two legs, a Golden Set is played immediately at the completion of the second leg.
- All times are local.

Team 1	Agg.	Team 2	1st leg	2nd leg
	–		–	–

==== First leg ====
Date	Time	Score	Set 1	Set 2	Set 3	Set 4	Set 5	Total	Report
31 Mar		–	–	–	–			0–0	Report

==== Second leg ====
Date	Time	Score	Set 1	Set 2	Set 3	Set 4	Set 5	Total	Report
7 Apr		–	–	–	–			0–0	Report

== Final standings ==
Rank	Team
1st place, gold medalist(s)	
2nd place, silver medalist(s)	
Semifinalists	
