= Francisco Pombeiro =

Portuguese volleyball player (born 1996)

Personal information
- Full name: Francisco Maria Nogueira Neves Pereira Pombeiro
- Nationality: Portuguese
- Born: 14 July 1996 (age 30); Portugal
- Height: 1.89 m (6 ft 2 in)

Volleyball information
- Position: Setter
- Current club: (Portugal) Sporting CP
- Number: 15

Career
Years	Teams
2014-2015; 2015-2016; 2016-2018; 2018-2019; 2019-	(Portugal) SC Caldas (Portugal) GC Vilacondense (Portugal) Vitória SC (Portugal) AJ Fonte do Bastardo (Portugal) Sporting CP

Francisco Pombeiro (born 14 July 1996) is a Portuguese volleyball player who plays for Sporting CP.
