= Renan Purificação =

Brazilian volleyball player (born 1991)

Personal information
- Full name: Renan Freire da Purificação
- Born: November 27, 1991 (age 34); Rio de Janeiro, Brazil
- Height: 1.96 m (6 ft 5 in)
- Weight: 89 kg (196 lb)

Volleyball information
- Position: Outside hitter
- Current club: (Portugal) Sporting CP
- Number: 16

Career
Years	Teams
2008-2011; 2011-2013; 2013-2014; 2014-2015; 2015-2016; 2016-2017; 2017-2018; 2018-2019; 2019-	(Brazil) Minas TC (Brazil) RJX Rio de Janeiro (Brazil) Maringá Vôlei (Brazil) Voleisul (Brazil) América Vôlei (Brazil) SESC Rio de Janeiro (Portugal) Castêlo da Maia GC (Portugal) AJ Fonte do Bastardo (Portugal) Sporting CP

Renan Freire da Purificação (born November 27, 1991) is a Brazilian volleyball player who plays for Sporting CP.
