= Portuguese Women's Volleyball Second Division =

Portuguese Women’s Volleyball Second Division

The Portuguese Women’s Volleyball Second Division is the second-level Women’s Volleyball League in Portugal, which is also called (Portuguese: "3a Divisão de Voleibol"). After the 2010/2011 season, The Portuguese Women's Volleyball League A2 was cancelled, and Portuguese Women's Volleyball Second Division become the second tier in Portuguese volleyball system. The competition is organized by the Federação Portuguesa de Voleibol.

== Portuguese League Champions – 2nd Division ==
| Year | Final Standings |
| Year | II Division A1 | II Division A2 |
| 1973/1974 | C. Fluvial Portuense | n/a |
| 1974/1975 | SC Vila Real | n/a |
| 1975/1976 | A. Basket C. | n/a |
| 1976/1977 | Estrela Vigorosa S. | n/a |
| 1977/1978 | LRD Amélia | n/a |
| 1978/1979 | SC Espinho | n/a |
| 1979/1980 | Estrela Vigorosa S. | n/a |
| 1980/1981 | Vitória SC | n/a |
| 1981/1982 | S.L. Benfica | n/a |
| 1982/1983 | Estrela Vigorosa S. | n/a |
| 1983/1984 | Associação Grundig | Boavista FC |
| 1984/1985 | ISEF Lisboa | n/a |
| 1985/1986 | Col. S. João de Brito | n/a |
| 1986/1987 | Esmoriz GC | SC Vianense |
| 1987/1988 | Associação Grundig | S.L. Benfica |
| 1988/1989 | Associação Grundig | n/a |
| 1989/1990 | CCR Fermentões | n/a |
| 1990/1991 | VCS Miguel | n/a |
| 1991/1992 | GC Vilacondense | n/a |
| 1992/1993 | AEIS Técnico | n/a |
| 1993/1994 | S.L. Benfica | n/a |
| 1994/1995 | CCD Coelima | n/a |
| 1995/1996 | AEIS Técnico | n/a |
| 1996/1997 | Esc. Filipa de Lencastre | n/a |
| 1997/1998 | CSD Câmara de Lobos | n/a |
| 1998/1999 | Académico de Viseu | n/a |
| 1999/2000 | Leixões SC | n/a |
| 2000/2001 | CCD Coelima | Esc. Prep Arrifes (B) |
| 2001/2002 | Famalicense AC | n/a |
| 2002/2003 | SC Espinho | CV Oeiras |
| 2003/2004 | GC Stº Tirso | CD Ribeirense |
| 2004/2005 | Clube Kairós | Juv. Pacense |
| 2005/2006 | Ala Nun'Alvares Gondomar | CF Belenenses |
| 2006/2007 | Vitória SC | CV Lisboa |
| 2007/2008 | SC Srª Hora | AC Juventude |
| 2008/2009 | Lusófona VC | Atlético VC |
| 2009/2010 | Castêlo da Maia GC | CV Lisboa |
| 2010/2011 | Atlético VC | AA S. Mamede |
| 2011/2012 | Lusófona VC | Boavista FC |
| 2012/2013 | Atlético VC | Boavista FC |
| 2013/2014 | CV Lisboa | Boavista FC |
| 2014/2015 | AE Pedro Eanes Lobato | Clube Kairós |
| 2015/2016 | Clube Kairós | CS Madeira |
| 2016/2017 | GC Vilacondense | ADRE Praiense |
