= Hélio Sanches =

Cape Verdean volleyball player (born 1991)

Personal information
- Nationality: Cape Verdean
- Born: 10 May 1991 (age 35); Cape Verde
- Height: 2.01 m (6 ft 7 in)
- Weight: 93 kg (205 lb)

Volleyball information
- Position: Middle Blocker
- Current club: Sporting CP
- Number: 19

Career
| Years | Teams |
|---|---|
| 2014-2016; 2016-2018; 2018- | (Portugal) Castêlo da Maia (Portugal) SC Espinho (Portugal) Sporting CP |

Hélio Sanches (born 10 May 1991) is a Cape Verdean volleyball player who plays for Sporting CP.

== Honours ==
- Portuguese Volleyball Super Cup: 2017
