= 2026–27 CEV Women's Champions League =

- League: CEV Champions League
- Sport: Volleyball
- Duration: Qualifying round: 20 Oct – 12 Nov 2026; Main tournament: 24 Nov 2026 – 2 May 2027
- Matches: 78 (main tournament)
- Teams: Main tournament: 20; Total: 26

CEV Women's Champions League seasons
- ← 2025–26 2027–28 →

The 2026–27 CEV Women's Champions League is the 67th edition of the highest level European volleyball club competition organised by the European Volleyball Confederation.

== Qualification ==
Of the 20 participating teams in the league round, 16 teams qualified directly, 2 teams were given wild cards and 2 teams qualified from the third round.

Rank	Country	Points	No. of teams			Qualified teams
Rank	Country	Points	League	WC	Qual	Qualified teams
1	Italy	549.99	3	1	–	A. Carraro Prosecco Doc Conegliano
1	Italy	549.99	3	1	–	Savino Del Bene Scandicci
1	Italy	549.99	3	1	–	Numia Vero Volley Milano
1	Italy	549.99	3	1	–	Igor Gorgonzola Novara (wild card)
2	Turkey	496.72	3	1	–	VakifBank Istanbul
2	Turkey	496.72	3	1	–	Fenerbahçe Medicana Istanbul
2	Turkey	496.72	3	1	–	Eczacıbaşı Peron Istanbul
2	Turkey	496.72	3	1	–	Galatasaray Daikin Istanbul (wild card)
3	Poland	379.33	3	–	–	PGE Budowlani Łódź
3	Poland	379.33	3	–	–	Developres Rzeszów
3	Poland	379.33	3	–	–	UNI Opole
5	Germany	245.66	2	–	–	VfB Suhl Thüringen
5	Germany	245.66	2	–	–	Dresdner SC
6	France	177.00	2	–	–	Volley Mulhouse Alsace
6	France	177.00	2	–	–	Levallois Paris Saint Cloud
7	Romania	129.66	1	–	–	C.S.O. Voluntari 2005
8	Serbia	104.67	1	–	–	Tent Obrenovac
9	Hungary	89.66	1	–	–	Vasas Óbuda Budapest
15	Belgium	55.33	–	–	1	Asterix Avo Beveren
N/A	Azerbaijan	0.00	–	–	1	Turan Tovuz

== Pools composition ==
The drawing of lots was held on 15 July 2026 in Luxembourg City.

Pool A	Pool B	Pool C
VakifBank Istanbul	A. Carraro P. Doc Conegliano	Fenerbahçe Medicana Istanbul
UNI Opole	Developres Rzeszów	Numia Vero Volley Milano
Volley Mulhouse Alsace	Dresdner SC	Levallois Paris Saint Cloud
Asterix Avo Beveren	Igor Gorgonzola Novara	Vasas Óbuda Budapest

Pool D	Pool E
Savino Del Bene Scandicci	PGE Budowlani Łódź
Eczacıbaşı Peron Istanbul	VfB Suhl Thüringen
Tent Obrenovac	C.S.O. Voluntari 2005
Turan Tovuz	Galatasaray Daikin Istanbul

== League round ==
- The teams are split into 5 groups, each one featuring four teams.
- The top team in each pool automatically qualifies for the quarterfinals.
- All 2nd placed teams and the best 3rd placed team qualify for the playoffs.
- The remaining 3rd placed teams will compete in the quarterfinals of the 2026–27 CEV Cup.
- All times are local.

=== Pool standing procedure ===
The ranking of teams in the league round will be determined as follows:

1. Number of victories
2. Result points (3 points for 3–0 or 3–1 wins, 2 points for 3–2 win, 1 point for 2–3 loss, 0 points for 0–3 or 1–3 losses)
3. Set ratio (total sets won divided by total sets lost)
4. Points ratio (total points scored divided by total points conceded)
5. Head-to-Head results

=== Pool A ===
Pos	Team	Pld	W	L	Pts	SW	SL	SR	SPW	SPL	SPR
1	(Turkey) VakifBank Istanbul	0	0	0	0	0	0	—	0	0	—
2	(Poland) UNI Opole	0	0	0	0	0	0	—	0	0	—
3	(France) Volley Mulhouse Alsace	0	0	0	0	0	0	—	0	0	—
4	(Belgium) Asterix Avo Beveren	0	0	0	0	0	0	—	0	0	—

First match(es) will be played: 25 November 2026. Source: CEV

Date	Time		Score		Set 1	Set 2	Set 3	Set 4	Set 5	Total	Report
25 Nov	19:00	VakifBank Istanbul (Turkey)	–	(Belgium) Asterix Avo Beveren	–	–	–			0–0	Report
26 Nov	18:00	UNI Opole (Poland)	–	(France) Volley Mulhouse Alsace	–	–	–			0–0	Report
1 Dec	19:00	Volley Mulhouse Alsace (France)	–	(Turkey) VakifBank Istanbul	–	–	–			0–0	Report
2 Dec	19:00	Asterix Avo Beveren (Belgium)	–	(Poland) UNI Opole	–	–	–			0–0	Report
16 Dec	19:30	Asterix Avo Beveren (Belgium)	–	(France) Volley Mulhouse Alsace	–	–	–			0–0	Report
17 Dec	19:00	VakifBank Istanbul (Turkey)	–	(Poland) UNI Opole	–	–	–			0–0	Report
12 Jan	18:00	UNI Opole (Poland)	–	(Belgium) Asterix Avo Beveren	–	–	–			0–0	Report
12 Jan	20:00	VakifBank Istanbul (Turkey)	–	(France) Volley Mulhouse Alsace	–	–	–			0–0	Report
27 Jan	19:30	Asterix Avo Beveren (Belgium)	–	(Turkey) VakifBank Istanbul	–	–	–			0–0	Report
27 Jan	20:30	Volley Mulhouse Alsace (France)	–	(Poland) UNI Opole	–	–	–			0–0	Report
3 Feb	19:00	Volley Mulhouse Alsace (France)	–	(Belgium) Asterix Avo Beveren	–	–	–			0–0	Report
3 Feb	20:30	UNI Opole (Poland)	–	(Turkey) VakifBank Istanbul	–	–	–			0–0	Report

=== Pool B ===
Pos	Team	Pld	W	L	Pts	SW	SL	SR	SPW	SPL	SPR
1	(Italy) A. Carraro P. Doc Conegliano	0	0	0	0	0	0	—	0	0	—
2	(Poland) Developres Rzeszów	0	0	0	0	0	0	—	0	0	—
3	(Germany) Dresdner SC	0	0	0	0	0	0	—	0	0	—
4	(Italy) Igor Gorgonzola Novara	0	0	0	0	0	0	—	0	0	—

First match(es) will be played: 26 November 2026. Source: CEV

Date	Time		Score		Set 1	Set 2	Set 3	Set 4	Set 5	Total	Report
26 Nov	20:30	A. Carraro P. Doc Conegliano (Italy)	–	(Italy) Igor Gorgonzola Novara	–	–	–			0–0	Report
26 Nov	20:30	Developres Rzeszów (Poland)	–	(Germany) Dresdner SC	–	–	–			0–0	Report
2 Dec	19:00	Dresdner SC (Germany)	–	(Italy) A. Carraro P. Doc Conegliano	–	–	–			0–0	Report
2 Dec	20:30	Igor Gorgonzola Novara (Italy)	–	(Poland) Developres Rzeszów	–	–	–			0–0	Report
16 Dec	18:00	Developres Rzeszów (Poland)	–	(Italy) A. Carraro P. Doc Conegliano	–	–	–			0–0	Report
16 Dec	20:30	Igor Gorgonzola Novara (Italy)	–	(Germany) Dresdner SC	–	–	–			0–0	Report
13 Jan	20:00	Developres Rzeszów (Poland)	–	(Italy) Igor Gorgonzola Novara	–	–	–			0–0	Report
14 Jan	20:30	A. Carraro P. Doc Conegliano (Italy)	–	(Germany) Dresdner SC	–	–	–			0–0	Report
26 Jan	19:00	Dresdner SC (Germany)	–	(Poland) Developres Rzeszów	–	–	–			0–0	Report
27 Jan	20:30	Igor Gorgonzola Novara (Italy)	–	(Italy) A. Carraro P. Doc Conegliano	–	–	–			0–0	Report
3 Feb	19:00	Dresdner SC (Germany)	–	(Italy) Igor Gorgonzola Novara	–	–	–			0–0	Report
3 Feb	20:30	A. Carraro P. Doc Conegliano (Italy)	–	(Poland) Developres Rzeszów	–	–	–			0–0	Report

=== Pool C ===
Pos	Team	Pld	W	L	Pts	SW	SL	SR	SPW	SPL	SPR
1	(Turkey) Fenerbahçe Medicana Istanbul	0	0	0	0	0	0	—	0	0	—
2	(Italy) Numia Vero Volley Milano	0	0	0	0	0	0	—	0	0	—
3	(France) Levallois Paris Saint Cloud	0	0	0	0	0	0	—	0	0	—
4	(Hungary) Vasas Óbuda Budapest	0	0	0	0	0	0	—	0	0	—

First match(es) will be played: 24 November 2026. Source: CEV

Date	Time		Score		Set 1	Set 2	Set 3	Set 4	Set 5	Total	Report
24 Nov	19:00	Fenerbahçe Medicana Istanbul (Turkey)	–	(Hungary) Vasas Óbuda Budapest	–	–	–			0–0	Report
25 Nov	20:00	Numia Vero Volley Milano (Italy)	–	(France) Levallois Paris Saint Cloud	–	–	–			0–0	Report
1 Dec	18:30	Vasas Óbuda Budapest (Hungary)	–	(Italy) Numia Vero Volley Milano	–	–	–			0–0	Report
3 Dec	20:00	Levallois Paris Saint Cloud (France)	–	(Turkey) Fenerbahçe Medicana Istanbul	–	–	–			0–0	Report
15 Dec	18:30	Vasas Óbuda Budapest (Hungary)	–	(France) Levallois Paris Saint Cloud	–	–	–			0–0	Report
17 Dec	20:30	Numia Vero Volley Milano (Italy)	–	(Turkey) Fenerbahçe Medicana Istanbul	–	–	–			0–0	Report
12 Jan	19:00	Fenerbahçe Medicana Istanbul (Turkey)	–	(France) Levallois Paris Saint Cloud	–	–	–			0–0	Report
12 Jan	20:30	Numia Vero Volley Milano (Italy)	–	(Hungary) Vasas Óbuda Budapest	–	–	–			0–0	Report
26 Jan	19:00	Vasas Óbuda Budapest (Hungary)	–	(Turkey) Fenerbahçe Medicana Istanbul	–	–	–			0–0	Report
26 Jan	20:00	Levallois Paris Saint Cloud (France)	–	(Italy) Numia Vero Volley Milano	–	–	–			0–0	Report
3 Feb	19:00	Fenerbahçe Medicana Istanbul (Turkey)	–	(Italy) Numia Vero Volley Milano	–	–	–			0–0	Report
3 Feb	20:00	Levallois Paris Saint Cloud (France)	–	(Hungary) Vasas Óbuda Budapest	–	–	–			0–0	Report

=== Pool D ===
Pos	Team	Pld	W	L	Pts	SW	SL	SR	SPW	SPL	SPR
1	(Italy) Savino Del Bene Scandicci	0	0	0	0	0	0	—	0	0	—
2	(Turkey) Eczacıbaşı Peron Istanbul	0	0	0	0	0	0	—	0	0	—
3	(Serbia) Tent Obrenovac	0	0	0	0	0	0	—	0	0	—
4	(Azerbaijan) Turan Tovuz	0	0	0	0	0	0	—	0	0	—

First match(es) will be played: 24 November 2026. Source: CEV

Date	Time		Score		Set 1	Set 2	Set 3	Set 4	Set 5	Total	Report
24 Nov	19:00	Eczacıbaşı Peron Istanbul (Turkey)	–	(Serbia) Tent Obrenovac	–	–	–			0–0	Report
25 Nov	18:30	Savino Del Bene Scandicci (Italy)	–	(Azerbaijan) Turan Tovuz	–	–	–			0–0	Report
2 Dec	19:30	Eczacıbaşı Peron Istanbul (Turkey)	–	(Azerbaijan) Turan Tovuz	–	–	–			0–0	Report
3 Dec	19:00	Tent Obrenovac (Serbia)	–	(Italy) Savino Del Bene Scandicci	–	–	–			0–0	Report
16 Dec	19:00	Turan Tovuz (Azerbaijan)	–	(Serbia) Tent Obrenovac	–	–	–			0–0	Report
17 Dec	20:00	Eczacıbaşı Peron Istanbul (Turkey)	–	(Italy) Savino Del Bene Scandicci	–	–	–			0–0	Report
13 Jan	18:30	Savino Del Bene Scandicci (Italy)	–	(Serbia) Tent Obrenovac	–	–	–			0–0	Report
13 Jan	19:00	Turan Tovuz (Azerbaijan)	–	(Turkey) Eczacıbaşı Peron Istanbul	–	–	–			0–0	Report
27 Jan	19:00	Turan Tovuz (Azerbaijan)	–	(Italy) Savino Del Bene Scandicci	–	–	–			0–0	Report
27 Jan	19:00	Tent Obrenovac (Serbia)	–	(Turkey) Eczacıbaşı Peron Istanbul	–	–	–			0–0	Report
3 Feb	18:30	Savino Del Bene Scandicci (Italy)	–	(Turkey) Eczacıbaşı Peron Istanbul	–	–	–			0–0	Report
3 Feb	19:00	Tent Obrenovac (Serbia)	–	(Azerbaijan) Turan Tovuz	–	–	–			0–0	Report

=== Pool E ===
Pos	Team	Pld	W	L	Pts	SW	SL	SR	SPW	SPL	SPR
1	(Poland) PGE Budowlani Łódź	0	0	0	0	0	0	—	0	0	—
2	(Germany) VfB Suhl Thüringen	0	0	0	0	0	0	—	0	0	—
3	(Romania) C.S.O. Voluntari 2005	0	0	0	0	0	0	—	0	0	—
4	(Turkey) Galatasaray Daikin Istanbul	0	0	0	0	0	0	—	0	0	—

First match(es) will be played: 25 November 2026. Source: CEV

Date	Time		Score		Set 1	Set 2	Set 3	Set 4	Set 5	Total	Report
25 Nov	18:00	PGE Budowlani Łódź (Poland)	–	(Turkey) Galatasaray Daikin Istanbul	–	–	–			0–0	Report
25 Nov	19:00	VfB Suhl Thüringen (Germany)	–	(Romania) C.S.O. Voluntari 2005	–	–	–			0–0	Report
3 Dec	19:00	C.S.O. Voluntari 2005 (Romania)	–	(Poland) PGE Budowlani Łódź	–	–	–			0–0	Report
3 Dec	19:00	Galatasaray Daikin Istanbul (Turkey)	–	(Germany) VfB Suhl Thüringen	–	–	–			0–0	Report
15 Dec	19:00	Galatasaray Daikin Istanbul (Turkey)	–	(Romania) C.S.O. Voluntari 2005	–	–	–			0–0	Report
16 Dec	20:30	VfB Suhl Thüringen (Germany)	–	(Poland) PGE Budowlani Łódź	–	–	–			0–0	Report
13 Jan	18:00	PGE Budowlani Łódź (Poland)	–	(Romania) C.S.O. Voluntari 2005	–	–	–			0–0	Report
13 Jan	19:00	VfB Suhl Thüringen (Germany)	–	(Turkey) Galatasaray Daikin Istanbul	–	–	–			0–0	Report
27 Jan	19:00	C.S.O. Voluntari 2005 (Romania)	–	(Germany) VfB Suhl Thüringen	–	–	–			0–0	Report
28 Jan	19:00	Galatasaray Daikin Istanbul (Turkey)	–	(Poland) PGE Budowlani Łódź	–	–	–			0–0	Report
3 Feb	18:00	PGE Budowlani Łódź (Poland)	–	(Germany) VfB Suhl Thüringen	–	–	–			0–0	Report
3 Feb	19:00	C.S.O. Voluntari 2005 (Romania)	–	(Turkey) Galatasaray Daikin Istanbul	–	–	–			0–0	Report

=== First place ranking ===
Pos	Team	Pld	W	L	Pts	SW	SL	SR	SPW	SPL	SPR	Qualification
1		0	0	0	0	0	0	—	0	0	—	Quarterfinals
2		0	0	0	0	0	0	—	0	0	—	Quarterfinals
3		0	0	0	0	0	0	—	0	0	—	Quarterfinals
4		0	0	0	0	0	0	—	0	0	—	Quarterfinals
5		0	0	0	0	0	0	—	0	0	—	Quarterfinals

First match(es) will be played: 24 November 2026. Source: CEV

=== Second place ranking ===
Pos	Team	Pld	W	L	Pts	SW	SL	SR	SPW	SPL	SPR	Qualification
1		0	0	0	0	0	0	—	0	0	—	Playoffs
2		0	0	0	0	0	0	—	0	0	—	Playoffs
3		0	0	0	0	0	0	—	0	0	—	Playoffs
4		0	0	0	0	0	0	—	0	0	—	Playoffs
5		0	0	0	0	0	0	—	0	0	—	Playoffs

First match(es) will be played: 24 November 2026. Source: CEV

=== Third place ranking ===
Pos	Team	Pld	W	L	Pts	SW	SL	SR	SPW	SPL	SPR	Qualification
1		0	0	0	0	0	0	—	0	0	—	Playoffs
2		0	0	0	0	0	0	—	0	0	—	2026–27 CEV Cup
3		0	0	0	0	0	0	—	0	0	—	2026–27 CEV Cup
4		0	0	0	0	0	0	—	0	0	—	2026–27 CEV Cup
5		0	0	0	0	0	0	—	0	0	—	2026–27 CEV Cup

First match(es) will be played: 24 November 2026. Source: CEV

== Bracket ==
Playoff 6
1st Ranked 3rd Placed Team
1st Ranked 2nd Placed Team
5th Ranked 2nd Placed Team
2nd Ranked 2nd Placed Team
4th Ranked 2nd Placed Team
3rd Ranked 2nd Placed Team

Quarterfinals
3rd Ranked Pool Winner
2nd Ranked Pool Winner
5th Ranked Pool Winner
4th Ranked Pool Winner
1st Ranked Pool Winner

Semifinals

Final
Third place

== Playoff 6 ==
- The winners of the ties qualify for the quarterfinals.
- In case the teams are tied after two legs, a Golden Set is played immediately at the completion of the second leg.
- All times are local.

Team 1	Agg.	Team 2	1st leg	2nd leg
1st Ranked 3rd Placed Team	–	1st Ranked 2nd Placed Team	–	–
5th Ranked 2nd Placed Team	–	2nd Ranked 2nd Placed Team	–	–
4th Ranked 2nd Placed Team	–	3rd Ranked 2nd Placed Team	–	–

=== First leg ===
Date	Time		Score		Set 1	Set 2	Set 3	Set 4	Set 5	Total	Report
16–18 Feb		1st Ranked 3rd Placed Team	–	1st Ranked 2nd Placed Team	–	–	–			0–0	Report
16–18 Feb		5th Ranked 2nd Placed Team	–	2nd Ranked 2nd Placed Team	–	–	–			0–0	Report
16–18 Feb		4th Ranked 2nd Placed Team	–	3rd Ranked 2nd Placed Team	–	–	–			0–0	Report

=== Second leg ===
Date	Time		Score		Set 1	Set 2	Set 3	Set 4	Set 5	Total	Report
23–25 Feb		1st Ranked 2nd Placed Team	–	1st Ranked 3rd Placed Team	–	–	–			0–0	Report
23–25 Feb		2nd Ranked 2nd Placed Team	–	5th Ranked 2nd Placed Team	–	–	–			0–0	Report
23–25 Feb		3rd Ranked 2nd Placed Team	–	4th Ranked 2nd Placed Team	–	–	–			0–0	Report

== Quarterfinals ==
- The winners of the ties qualify for the final four.
- In case the teams are tied after two legs, a Golden Set is played immediately at the completion of the second leg.
- All times are local.

Team 1	Agg.	Team 2	1st leg	2nd leg
	–	3rd Ranked Pool Winner	–	–
	–	2nd Ranked Pool Winner	–	–
5th Ranked Pool Winner	–	4th Ranked Pool Winner	–	–
	–	1st Ranked Pool Winner	–	–

=== First leg ===
Date	Time		Score		Set 1	Set 2	Set 3	Set 4	Set 5	Total	Report
9–11 Mar			–	3rd Ranked Pool Winner	–	–	–			0–0	Report
9–11 Mar			–	2nd Ranked Pool Winner	–	–	–			0–0	Report
9–11 Mar		5th Ranked Pool Winner	–	4th Ranked Pool Winner	–	–	–			0–0	Report
9–11 Mar			–	1st Ranked Pool Winner	–	–	–			0–0	Report

=== Second leg ===
Date	Time		Score		Set 1	Set 2	Set 3	Set 4	Set 5	Total	Report
16–18 Mar		3rd Ranked Pool Winner	–		–	–	–			0–0	Report
16–18 Mar		2nd Ranked Pool Winner	–		–	–	–			0–0	Report
16–18 Mar		4th Ranked Pool Winner	–	5th Ranked Pool Winner	–	–	–			0–0	Report
16–18 Mar		1st Ranked Pool Winner	–		–	–	–			0–0	Report

== Final four ==
- Place: Ülker Sports Arena, Istanbul.
- Time: Turkey Time (UTC+03:00).

=== Semifinals ===
Date	Time	Score	Set 1	Set 2	Set 3	Set 4	Set 5	Total	Report
1 May		–	–	–	–			0–0	Report
1 May		–	–	–	–			0–0	Report

=== 3rd place match ===
Date	Time	Score	Set 1	Set 2	Set 3	Set 4	Set 5	Total	Report
2 May		–	–	–	–			0–0	Report

=== Final ===
Date	Time	Score	Set 1	Set 2	Set 3	Set 4	Set 5	Total	Report
2 May		–	–	–	–			0–0	Report

== Final standings ==
Rank	Team
1st place, gold medalist(s)	
2nd place, silver medalist(s)	
3rd place, bronze medalist(s)	
4	
