= Clube Desportivo Portosantense =

Clube Desportivo Portosantense

Club Name
CD Portosantense
Image

Arena

Porto Santo, Madeira
Portugal
Manager
(Portugal) André Silva
League
Portuguese Roller Hockey First Division
Position 2005-06
5th
Website

Clube Desportivo Portosantense is a Rink Hockey team from Porto Santo, Madeira, Portugal. It stayed in 5th in the 2005-06 Portuguese Championship.

== Squad 2006/07 ==
| # | | Name | Age | Last Club |
|---|---|---|---|---|
| | (Portugal) | João Miguel (GK) | 33 |
| | (Portugal) | Carlos Lopes (GK) | 29 | Portossantense B |
| | (Portugal) | Nuno Almeida | 34 |
| | (Portugal) | Nuno Resende | 31 |
| | (Portugal) | Hugo Drumond | 17 |
| | (Portugal) | Miguel Dantas | 25 | Salerno, (Italy) |
| | (Portugal) | André Moreira | 22 |
| | (Portugal) | Alan Fernandes | 25 |
| | (Portugal) | Tiago Santos | 23 |
| | (Argentina) | German Dates | 27 | HC Braga |
| | (Portugal) | Pedro Monteiro | 23 |
