= Associação Académica de Coimbra (volleyball) =

- Full name: Associação Académica de Coimbra - Secção de Voleibol
- Ground: University Stadium of Coimbra sports complex, Coimbra, Portugal
- Manager: (Portugal)
- League: A1 - Portugal
- Website: Club home page

The Coimbra Academic Association - volleyball (Portuguese: Associação Académica de Coimbra - Secção de Voleibol) is the volleyball sports section of the Coimbra Academic Association, from Coimbra, Portugal.

The AAC Voleibol team won the national championships in 1966/67, 1968/69 and 1970/71 seasons, and currently plays in the Portuguese Volleyball League A2. The AAC participates in the Supertaça (Supercup).
