= Portuguese Volleyball Federation =

Governing body of volleyball in Portugal

Portuguese Volleyball Federation Federação Portuguesa de Voleibol
- Formation: 7, April 1947
- Type: Volleyball Federation
- Headquarters: Federação Portuguesa de Voleibol; Avenida de França, 549, 4050-279 Porto
- Location: Portugal
- Members: FIVB; CEV
- Official language: Portuguese
- President: Vicente Araújo
- Budget: 4,889,163€
- Website: fpvoleibol.pt

The Portuguese Volleyball Federation (FPV) (in Portuguese: Federação Portuguesa de Voleibol) is the governing body of volleyball in Portugal. It is based in Porto.

== Male Competitions ==
It organizes the volleyball leagues:

- Campeonato Nacional de Voleibol - 1ª Divisão
- Campeonato Nacional de Voleibol - A2 (defunct)
- 2ª Divisão de Voleibol
- 3ª Divisão de Voleibol
- Taça de Portugal de Voleibol
- Supertaça de Voleibol

== Female Competitions ==
- Campeonato Nacional Feminino de Voleibol - A1
- Campeonato Nacional Feminino de Voleibol - A2
- 2a Divisão Feminina de Voleibol
- Taça de Portugal Feminina de Voleibol

== More information ==
It also organizes the Portugal men's national volleyball team and the Portuguese national women's volleyball team. It is a member of the Fédération Internationale de Volleyball and the Confédération Européenne de Volleyball.
