= Portuguese Women's Volleyball Cup =

Volleyball competition

Women's Volleyball Cup (Portugal)
- Sport: Volleyball
- First season: 1972–73
- Administrator: FPV
- Country: Portugal
- Most recent champion: FC Porto (2025/26)
- Most titles: Leixões SC (10 titles)
- Website: Portuguese Volleyball Federation

The Portuguese Women's Volleyball Cup (Portuguese: Taça de Portugal de Voleibol) is the national cup competition for women's volleyball clubs in Portugal. It is organized and administrated by the Portuguese Volleyball Federation (FPV). It is contested since 1972–73 by clubs of all Portuguese divisions.

Leixões SC is the most successful club having won the competition ten times. FC Porto are the current holders.

== Results ==
Season	Final
Season	Champion	Result	Runner-Up
1972–73	SL Benfica	3–1 (15–8, 15–12, 15–17, 15–9)	Leixões SC
1973–74	SL Benfica	3–0 (15–8, 15–12, 15–9)	CDUP
1974–75	Leixões SC	3–2 (15–10, 9–15, 15–7, 9–15, 15–11)	SL Benfica
1975–76	Leixões SC	3–2 (15–13, 15–11, 14–16, 14–16, 15–7)	SL Benfica
1976–77	Leixões SC	3–1 (15–11, 12–15, 15–11, 15–11)	SL Benfica
1977–78	Leixões SC	3–0 (15–5, 15–5, 15–12)	SL Benfica
1978–79	Leixões SC	3–0 (15–8, 15–7, 15–6)	Atlético CP
1979–80	Leixões SC	3–0 (15–6, 15–9, 16–4)	CDUP
1980–81	CDUP	3–0 (15–9, 15–1, 15–5)	CDUL
1981–82	Atlético CP	3–1 (4–15, 15–12, 15–8, 15–8)	Leixões SC
1982–83	Atlético CP	3–0 (15–13, 15–11, 15–10)	Leixões SC
1983–84	Atlético CP	3–2 (11–15, 16–18, 15–2, 15–5, 15–6)	Leixões SC
1984–85	Sporting CP	3–1 (15–12, 15–11, 6–15, 15–9)	Boavista FC
1985–86	Sporting CP	3–2 (15–17, 15–11, 15–13, 8–15, 19–17)	Leixões SC
1986–87	Boavista FC		Leixões SC
1987–88	Boavista FC		Leixões SC
1988–89	Leixões SC	3–1 (15–4, 15–10, 9–15, 15–3)	CR Estrelas da Avenida
1989–90	CR Estrelas da Avenida	3–0 (15–5, 16–14, 15–11)	SL Benfica
1990–91	Leixões SC	3–1 (15–10, 11–15, 15–7, 15–5)	CR Estrelas da Avenida
1991–92	Boavista FC	3–1 (15–11, 17–15, 13–15, 15–5)	Leixões SC
1992–93	Boavista FC	3–1 (15–9, 15–5, 13–15, 15–1)	Sporting CP
1993–94	Boavista FC	3–1 (15–11, 13–15, 15–5, 15–10)	Castêlo da Maia GC
1994–95	Boavista FC	3–0 (15–9, 15–13, 15–5)	Castêlo da Maia GC
1995–96	Castêlo da Maia GC	3–1 (15–12, 10–15, 16–14, 15–9)	CS Madeira
1996–97	Castêlo da Maia GC	3–0 (15–2, 15–4, 15–5)	Boavista FC
1997–98	Castêlo da Maia GC	3–0 (15–0, 15–4, 15–10)	CS Madeira
1998–99	Castêlo da Maia GC	3–0 (15–10, 15–0, 15–7)	Boavista FC
1999–00	Castêlo da Maia GC	3–2 (25–23, 22–25, 23–25, 25–21, 15–11)	CS Madeira
2000–01	Boavista FC	3–0 (25–20, 25–18, 25–21)	CS Madeira
2001–02	Castêlo da Maia GC	3–0 (25–19, 25–15, 25–15)	CSD Câmara de Lobos
2002–03	Castêlo da Maia/Ancor	3–2 (25–17, 22–25, 23–25, 25–17, 15–13)	CS Madeira
2003–04	Castêlo da Maia GC	3–2 (22–25, 19–25, 26–24, 25–17, 15–8)	CS Madeira
2004–05	CA Trofa/Real Seguros	3–0 (25–22, 25–20, 25–19)	Famalicense AC
2005–06	CA Trofa	3–0 (25–20, 25–18, 25–21)	CD Ribeirense
2006–07	CA Trofa	3–0 (25–13, 25–23, 25–14)	GDC Gueifães
2007–08	CS Madeira	3–0 (25–22, 25–17, 25–16)	GDC Gueifães
2008–09	CD Ribeirense	3–1 (25–14, 18–25, 25–17, 25–16)	GDC Gueifães
2009–10	CA Trofa	3–0 (25–15, 25–16, 25–09)	SC Braga
2010–11	CD Ribeirense	3–0 (25–17, 25–20, 26–24)	CA Trofa
2011–12	CD Ribeirense	3–0 (25–17, 25–13, 25–13)	Castêlo da Maia GC
2012–13	CD Ribeirense	3–1 (24–26, 25–23, 25–22, 25–20)	GDC Gueifães
2013–14	Col. Nª Sra. Rosário	3–2 (21–25, 19–25, 25–18, 25–19, 15–7)	CD Ribeirense
2014–15	Porto Vólei 2014	3–0 (25–23, 25–13, 25–18)	AVC Famalicão
2015–16	AVC Famalicão	3–1 (25–20, 19–25, 25–22, 25–22)	Porto Vólei 2014
2016–17	AVC Famalicão	3–1 (21–25, 25–20, 25–21, 25–22)	Leixões SC
2017–18	Porto Vólei 2014	3–0 (25–16, 25–23, 26–24)	Clube Kairós
2018–19	AA José Moreira	3–0 (25–22, 25–23, 25–20)	Clube Kairós
2019–20	AA José Moreira/FC Porto	3–0 (25–16, 25–18, 25–21)	Clube Kairós
2020–21	Leixões SC	3–1 (16–25, 25–21, 25–17, 25–20)	Sporting CP
2021–22	Leixões SC	3–0 (25–19, 25–15, 26–24)	Vitória SC
2022–23	Sporting CP	3–2 (25–22, 23–25, 23–25, 25–17, 15–13)	AA José Moreira/FC Porto
2023–24	SL Benfica	3–2 (25–22, 25–18, 21–25, 13–25, 15–12)	Porto Vólei 2014/PV Colégio Efanor
2024–25	Sporting CP	3–0 (25–13, 25–21, 29–27)	Vitória SC
2025–26	FC Porto	3–1 (25–21, 22–25, 25–23, 25–20)	SC Braga

== Titles by club ==
Club	Winners	Runners-up	Years won	Years runner-up
Leixões SC	10	9	1975, 1976, 1977, 1978, 1979, 1980, 1989, 1991, 2021, 2022	1973, 1982, 1983, 1984, 1986, 1987, 1988, 1992, 2017
Castêlo da Maia GC	8	3	1996, 1997, 1998, 1999, 2000, 2002, 2003, 2004	1994, 1995, 2012
Boavista FC	7	3	1987, 1988, 1992, 1993, 1994, 1995, 2001	1985, 1997, 1999
CD Ribeirense	4	2	2009, 2011, 2012, 2013	2006, 2014
CA Trofa	4	1	2005, 2006, 2007, 2010	2011
SL Benfica	3	5	1973, 1974, 2024	1975, 1976, 1977, 1978, 1990
Sporting CP	4	2	1985, 1986, 2023, 2025	1993, 2021
Atlético CP	3	1	1982, 1983, 1984	1979
AA José Moreira/FC Porto	3	1	2019, 2020, 2026	2023
Porto Volei/PV Colégio Efanor	2	2	2015, 2018	2016, 2024
AVC Famalicão	2	1	2016, 2017	2015
CS Madeira	1	6	2008	1996, 1998, 2000, 2001, 2003, 2004
CDUP	1	2	1981	1974, 1980
CR Estrelas da Avenida	1	2	1990	1989, 1991
Col. Nª Sra. Rosário	1	0	2014	–
GDC Gueifães	0	4	–	2007, 2008, 2009, 2013
Clube Kairós	0	3	–	2018, 2019, 2020
SC Braga	0	2	–	2010, 2026
CDUL	0	1	–	1981
CSD Câmara de Lobos	0	1	–	2002
Famalicense AC	0	1	–	2005
Vitória SC	0	2	–	2022, 2025
