= C.S. Marítimo (volleyball) =

Club Sport Marítimo
- Short name: C.S. Marítimo
- Ground: Pavilhão da Levada, Funchal, Madeira, Portugal.
- Manager: (Portugal)
- League: A1 - Portugal
- 2011-12 season: 10th
- Website: Club home page

Uniforms
Home	Away

Club Sport Marítimo is a Volleyball team based in Funchal, Madeira, Portugal. It plays in Portuguese Volleyball League A1.

== Achievements ==
- Portuguese Volleyball League A2:1

1999/00
