= First Division Women's Volleyball League (Portugal) =

Portuguese First Division Women's Volleyball National Championship
- Sport: Volleyball
- First season: 1959–60
- Administrator: FPV
- No. of teams: 12
- Country: Portugal
- Most recent champion: FC Porto (5th title)
- Most titles: Leixões SC (18 titles)
- Level on pyramid: 1
- Domestic cups: Portuguese Cup; Portuguese Super Cup
- International cups: CEV Cup; CEV Challenge Cup
- Website: Portuguese Volleyball Federation

The Portuguese First Division Women's Volleyball National Championship (Portuguese: Campeonato Nacional de Voleibol – 1ª Divisão) is the highest professional women's volleyball league in Portugal. It is organized and administrated by the Portuguese Volleyball Federation (FPV).

== History ==
The competition is contested since its inaugural season in 1959–60. It was renamed Honour Division (Portuguese: Divisão de Honra) for the 1983–84, 1986–87 and 1987–88 seasons. The league was restructured in the 1998–99 season, with the creation of Series A1 and A2 and the introduction of a play-off system at the final stages of the competition. In the 2011–12 season, the Series A! and A2 were restored to a single first division. Since the 2014–15 season, the competition champion is called the Elite Champion while the four losing first round play-off teams compete for a secondary title (First Division Champion).

== Results ==
=== National Championship ===
Season	Champion	Score	Runner-up	Reference
1958–59	Sporting CP	Round-robin	Leixões SC
1959–60	SC Espinho	Round-robin	Sporting CP
1960–61	SC Espinho
1961–62	CDUP
1962–63	SC Espinho
1963–64	SC Espinho
1964–65	Leixões SC	Round-robin	SL Benfica
1965–66	Leixões SC
1966–67	SL Benfica	Round-robin	CDUL
1967–68	SL Benfica
1968–69	SL Benfica
1969–70	SL Benfica
1970–71	SL Benfica
1971–72	SL Benfica
1972–73	SL Benfica
1973–74	SL Benfica
1974–75	SL Benfica
1975–76	Leixões SC
1976–77	Leixões SC
1977–78	Leixões SC
1978–79	Leixões SC
1979–80	Leixões SC
1980–81	Leixões SC
1981–82	Leixões SC
1982–83	Leixões SC
1983–84	Leixões SC
1984–85	Leixões SC
1985–86	Leixões SC
1986–87	Boavista FC
1987–88	Boavista FC
1988–89	Leixões SC
1989–90	Boavista FC
1990–91	CR Estrelas da Avenida
1991–92	Leixões SC
1992–93	Boavista FC
1993–94	Castêlo da Maia GC	3–2, 0–3, 3–2, 3–2	Boavista FC
1994–95	Boavista FC
1995–96	Castêlo da Maia GC
1996–97	Castêlo da Maia GC
1997–98	Castêlo da Maia GC

=== National Championship – Serie A1 ===
Season	Final
Season	Champion	Score	Runner-up	Reference
1998–99	Castêlo da Maia GC
1999–00	Castêlo da Maia GC
2000–01	Castêlo da Maia GC	3–0, 0–3, 3–1, 1–3, 3–0	Boavista FC
2001–02	Castêlo da Maia GC	3–1, 3–1, 3–0	Boavista FC
2002–03	Castêlo da Maia/Ancor	3–0, 3–0, 3–1	CS Madeira
2003–04	CS Madeira	3–0, 3–2, 3–2	Boavista FC
2004–05	CA Trofa	3–2, 3–2, 3–1	CS Madeira
2005–06	CS Madeira	3–0, 3–1, 2–3, 3–0	CA Trofa
2006–07	CA Trofa	3–1, 3–0, 3–2	CD Ribeirense
2007–08	CA Trofa	3–1, 3–1, 3–0	CD Ribeirense
2008–09	CA Trofa	3–0, 3–1, 3–0	CD Ribeirense
2009–10	CA Trofa	1–3, 3–2, 3–1, 3–1	CD Ribeirense
2010–11	CD Ribeirense	3–2, 3–2	CA Trofa

=== National Championship – First Division ===
Year	Final
Year	Champion	Score	Runner-up
2011–12	CD Ribeirense	0–3, 3–1, 3–2	GDC Gueifães
2012–13	CD Ribeirense	3–0, 3–1	Leixões SC
2013–14	Colégio Nª Sª Rosário	1–3, 3–0, 3–1	CD Ribeirense
Year	Final
Year	Elite Champion	Score	Runner-up	First Division Champion
2014–15	Porto Vólei 2014	1–3, 3–0, 2–3, 3–0, 3–1	Leixões SC	CF Belenenses
2015–16	AVC Famalicão	3–0, 0–3, 3–0, 3–0	Porto Vólei 2014	Leixões SC
2016–17	Leixões SC	3–2, 1–3, 3–0, 3–1	Porto Vólei 2014	Clube Kairos
2017–18	Leixões SC	0–3, 3–0, 3–0, 2–3, 3–1	Clube Kairos	Porto Vólei 2014
Year	Final
Year	Elite Champion	Score	Runner-up	Taça FVP Champion
2018–19	Leixões SC	3–2, 0–3, 3–2, 3–2	AVC Famalicão	Clube Kairos
2019–20	Cancelled due to COVID-19 Pandemic
2020–21	AJM/FC Porto	3–2, 3–1, 3–2	Leixões SC	Sporting CP
2021–22	AJM/FC Porto	3–0, 3–0, 1–3, 0–3, 3–1	Leixões SC	Sporting CP
2022–23	AJM/FC Porto	3–1, 3–0, 3–0	Sporting CP	SL Benfica
2023–24	FC Porto	3–0, 1–3, 3–2, 1–3, 3–0	PV Colégio Efanor	Vitória SC
2024–25	SL Benfica	2-3, 2-3, 3–1, 3–0, 3–2	SC Braga
2025–26	FC Porto	3–0, 0–3, 3–0, 3–0	SC Braga

== Titles by club ==
Rank	Club	Titles	Champion Years
1	Leixões SC	18	1964–65, 1965–66, 1975–76, 1976–77, 1977–78, 1978–79, 1979–80, 1980–81, 1981–82, 1982–83, 1983–84, 1984–85, 1985–86, 1988–89, 1991–92, 2016–17, 2017–18, 2018–19
2	SL Benfica	10	1966–67, 1967–68, 1968–69, 1969–70, 1970–71, 1971–72, 1972–73, 1973–74, 1974–75, 2024–25
2	Castêlo da Maia GC	9	1993–94, 1995–96, 1996–97, 1997–98, 1998–99, 1999–00, 2000–01, 2001–02, 2002–03
4	Boavista F.C.	5	1986–87, 1987–88, 1989–90, 1992–93, 1994–95
4	Clube Académico da Trofa	5	2004–05, 2006–07, 2007–08, 2008–09, 2009–10
4	AJM/FC Porto	5	2020–21, 2021–22, 2022–23, 2023–24, 2025–26
6	SC Espinho	4	1959–60, 1960–61, 1962–63, 1963–64
8	Clube Desportivo Ribeirense	3	2010–11, 2011–12, 2012–13
9	Club Sports da Madeira	2	2003–04, 2005–06
10	CDUP	1	1961–62
10	Centro Recreativo Estrelas da Avenida	1	1990–91
10	Colégio de Nossa Senhora do Rosário	1	2013–14
10	Porto Vólei	1	2014–15
10	AVC Famalicão	1	2015–16
