= Mika Grbavica =

Croatian volleyball player (born 2001)

Personal information
- Born: 8 December 2001 (age 24); Osijek, Croatia
- Height: 1.91 m (6 ft 3 in)
- Spike: 315 cm (124 in)
- Block: 305 cm (120 in)

Volleyball information
- Position: Opposite hitter
- Current club: Dresdner SC

Career
Years	Teams
2017–2018; 2018–2022; 2022–	OK Poreč; HAOK Mladost; Dresdner SC

National team
Croatia
Honours
Women's volleyball
Representing Croatia
FIVB Challenger Cup
Gold medal – first place	2022 Zadar

Mika Grbavica (born 8 December 2001) is a Croatian volleyball player. She plays as opposite hitter for German club Dresdner SC.
