= Ginásio Clube Vilacondense =

- Short name: GC Vilacondense
- Ground: Vila do Conde, Portugal
- Manager: (Portugal) Hugo Silva
- League: A1 - Portugal
- 2011-12 season: 8th
- Website: Club home page

Uniforms
Home	Away

Ginásio Clube Vilacondense is a Volleyball team based in Vila do Conde, Portugal. It plays in Portuguese Volleyball League A1 and a Portuguese karaté champions team.

== Achievements ==
- Portuguese sport clube: 1 (2001/02)
