= FC Porto (volleyball) =

Porto
- Full name: Futebol Clube do Porto
- Nickname: Dragões (Dragons); Azuis e brancos (Blue-and-Whites)
- Founded: Women's: 9 September 2019 (7 years ago)
- Ground: Dragão Arena (Capacity: 2,179)
- President: André Villas-Boas
- Head coach: Miguel Coelho
- League: Campeonato Nacional Primeira Divisão
- 2025–26: Winners (1st of 12 teams)
- Website: Club home page
- Championships: 5 (women), 9 (men)

Uniforms
Home	Away

Futebol Clube do Porto, commonly known as FC Porto or simply Porto, is a Portuguese professional volleyball team based in Porto, which plays in the Primeira Divisão, the top-tier women's volleyball league in Portugal. Established in 2019 in a partnership with Academia José Moreira (AJM) and an wholly-owned club team since 2023, it represents the women's volleyball department of multi-sports club FC Porto.

The team's home ground is the Dragão Arena, which they share with the other club's indoor departments. The current head coach is Miguel Coelho.

== Squad ==
=== Players ===
For the 2026–27 season, the women's first-team squad is composed of the following players:

No.	Player	Nationality	Birthdate	Height	Position
1	Saška Đurović	Montenegro	4 September 2001 (age 25)	190	Middle blocker
3	Milana Božić	Bosnia and Herzegovina	19 July 2000 (age 26)	186	Setter
4	Eliana Durão	Portugal	1 January 1997 (age 29)	172	Setter
6	Natalia Murek Paszkowska	Poland	8 September 1999 (age 27)	180	Outside hitter
7	Beatriz Basto	Portugal	31 August 2001 (age 25)	159	Libero
8	Victória Alves	Brazil	17 August 1996 (age 30)	183	Outside hitter
13	Annie Cesar	Germany	26 April 1997 (age 29)	173	Libero
14	Kelsey Veltman	Canada	2 April 1996 (age 30)	189	Middle blocker
15	Shainah Joseph	Canada	15 May 1995 (age 31)	185	Opposite
17	Caylen Alexander	United States	2 June 2004 (age 22)	183	Outside hitter
18	Nataša Čikiriz	Serbia	26 June 1995 (age 31)	193	Opposite
19	Ana Rui Monteiro	Portugal	19 April 2005 (age 21)	186	Outside hitter
20	Grace Calnan	Canada	20 June 2001 (age 25)	191	Middle blocker
28	Nieko Thomas	United States	6 November 2002 (age 23)	188	Middle blocker

=== Staff and personnel ===
Position	Name
Head coach	Miguel Coelho
Assistant coach	Manuel Almeida; Luís Godinho; Pedro Caranguejeiro; Lourenço Afonso
Fitness coach	João Domingues
Team doctor	Elisa Moreira
Physiotherapist	Diogo Perreira
Physical preparation coach	João Domingues
Team manager	José Carlos Alves
Equipment technician	Bruno Andrade

== Honours ==
=== Women ===
Porto have won a total of 13 titles in women's volleyball:

- Campeonato Nacional Primeira Divisão
  - Winners (5): 2020–21*, 2021–22*, 2022–23*, 2023–24, 2025–26
- Taça de Portugal
  - Winners (2): 2019–20*, 2025–26
- Supertaça de Portugal
  - Winners (5): 2019*, 2020*, 2021*, 2022*, 2026
- Taça Ibérica
  - Winners (1): 2024

Note: asterisks indicate honours achieved as AJM/FC Porto.

=== Men ===
Porto have won a total of 15 titles in men's volleyball:

- Campeonato Nacional Primeira Divisão
  - Winners (9): 1968–69, 1969–70, 1970–71, 1972–73, 1974–75, 1976–77, 1977–78, 1985–86, 1987–88
- Taça de Portugal
  - Winners (6): 1967–68, 1969–70, 1970–71, 1971–72, 1986–87, 1987–88
