= Castêlo da Maia Ginásio Clube =

Castêlo da Maia GC
- Short name: Castêlo da Maia
- Ground: Maia, Portugal
- Manager: (Portugal) Santos Cardoso
- League: A1 - Portugal
- 2011-12 season: 5th
- Website: Club home page

Uniforms
Home	Away

Castêlo da Maia Ginásio Clube is a volleyball team based in Maia, Portugal. Castêlo was created on 5 February 1973. It plays in the Portuguese Volleyball League A1.

== Achievements ==
=== Men ===
- Portuguese Volleyball League A1: 4

2000–01, 2001–02, 2002–03, 2003–04

- Portuguese Volleyball Cup: 6

1993–94, 2001–02, 2002–03, 2003–04, 2009–10, 2013–14

- Portuguese Volleyball SuperCup: 5

1994, 1996, 1999, 2001, 2010

- Portuguese Volleyball League II: 1

1989–90

- Portuguese Volleyball League III: 2

=== Women ===
- Portuguese Volleyball League A1: 6

1997–1998, 1998–1999, 1999–2000, 2000–2001, 2001–2002, 2002–2003

- Portuguese Volleyball Cup: 8

1995–1996, 1996–1997, 1997–1998, 1998–1999, 1999–2000, 2001–2002, 2002–2003, 2003–2004

- Portuguese SuperCup: 6
- Portuguese Volleyball League III: 1
