= Sporting CP (volleyball) =

Portuguese volleyball team

- Full name: Sporting Clube de Portugal
- Founded: 1938
- Ground: Pavilhão João Rocha (Capacity: 3,000)
- President: Frederico Varandas
- Manager: João Coelho
- Captain: Tiago Pereira
- League: Portuguese First Division

Uniforms
Home	Away

Sporting Clube de Portugal (Portuguese pronunciation: [sɨˈpɔɾtĩ ˈkluβɨ ðɨ puɾtuˈɣal]), otherwise referred to as Sporting CP, is a professional volleyball team based in Lisbon, Portugal. It is the volleyball section of Sporting CP.

== History ==
Volleyball was introduced in Sporting Clube de Portugal in the 1930s by influence of Salazar Carreira, constituting the club itself as one of the founders of the Association of Volleyball of Lisbon on 28 December 1938.

The club would only reach its first titles in the fifties thanks to the dynamism of Professor Moniz Pereira, who was a manager, coach and player of the team that, in the 1953/54 season, broke the hegemony of the Instituto Superior Técnico volleyball team that until then had conquered all National Championships, which were disputed since 1947. In addition to Moniz Pereira, the Yugoslavs Jost and Budisin, Xara Brazil, Marques Pereira, Fernando Fezas Vital, Machado da Costa, Anibal Rebelo and Plácido Martins, helped the team to win several trophies.

At the women's level the first official competition in Portugal began in June 1951, and Sporting Clube de Portugal was one of four clubs that took part in the competition, with the Lionesses being in second place. After a brilliant period with the achievement of winning the National Championships of 1953/54 and 1955/56, the sport competitiveness of Sporting Portugal’s volleyball department declined, being fundamentally supported by successes at youth training and development levels and at the women’s team, ending up being extinguished at the beginning of the 1964/65 season with the club's restructuring.

At the end of almost two decades of interregnum, the sport was again practiced in 1981/82, first only in women's volleyball at senior and junior levels, but later the sport returned at its full competitive scale to Sporting Portugal and those return to the sport, in men’s and women’s competitions were truly golden years for the club. In the 1990s, with a team led by António Rodrigues, and with some of the best players of the time, such as Nilson Júnior, Carlos Natário, Miguel Maia, Wagner Silva, Luís Cláudio, Magrão, Filipe Vitó, Marcelo and Maurício Cavalcanti. Carlos Silveira, Miguel Soares and Américo Silva, Sporting was National Champion in three seasons and won a Portuguese Cup and two Super Cups.

In the first half of the decade of 1990, to the referred conquests were added still more two Cups of Portugal and a Supertaça (Supercup). However, the victorious momentum was abruptly interrupted at the beginning of the Roquette Project (after José Roquette who was the president of Sporting Portugal at the time) in 1995. One of the first measures of financial reorganization of the Board chaired by Pedro Santana Lopes was to end various high competition modalities at Sporting Portugal, including volleyball.

In November 1995, a group of coaches, athletes and their parents from the former section belonging to Sporting Portugal that had been extinguished at the sports club decided to found the Lisbon Volleyball Center, a non-profit sports institution dedicated to teaching and practicing volleyball.

On 5 June 2017, Sporting Clube de Portugal officially announced that volleyball will become part of the club’s eclectic vision, mission and purpose again, with the men's senior team competing in the First National Division in the 2017/18 season, with the help of star player Miguel Maia. Sporting Clube de Portugal reactivated its women's volleyball team in the 2017/18 season, with a senior squad competing in the Portuguese 3rd division. This came after the sport was discontinued in 1995 due to financial measures by the management at the time. The successful project, led by Rui Pedro Costa, propelled the senior team to the top national league in just two seasons, after having won two national women’s championships in the third and second divisions.

== Facilities ==
=== Pavilhão João Rocha ===
Pavilhão João Rocha is a multi-sports arena located in Lisbon. Located next to the Estádio José Alvalade, it is the home of Sporting CP indoor sports teams and was named after former club president João Rocha.

== Honours ==
=== Domestic Competitions ===
- Portuguese Volleyball First Division: 8

1953/1954, 1955/1956, 1991/1992, 1992/1993, 1993/1994, 2017/2018, 2024/2025, 2025/2026

- Portuguese Volleyball Cup: 6

1990/1991, 1992/1993, 1994/1995, 2020/2021, 2023/2024, 2025/2026

- Portuguese Volleyball Super Cup: 6

1991, 1992, 1993, 2024, 2025, 2026

- Portuguese Federation Cup: 1

2022/2023

- Portuguese Volleyball Second Division: 3

1958/1959, 1983/1984, 1984/1985

- Portuguese Volleyball Third Division: 1

1982/1983

=== Continental Competition ===
- Iberian Cup: 2

2024, 2026

=== Domestic Competitions ===
- Portuguese First Division Women's Volleyball League

1958/1959

- Portuguese Women's Volleyball Cup: 4

1984/1985, 1985/1986, 2022/2023, 2024/2025

- Portuguese Women's Volleyball Super Cup: 1

1986/1987

- Portuguese Federation Cup: 2

2020/2021, 2021/2022

- Portuguese Women's Volleyball Second Division: 1

2018/2019

- Portuguese Women's Volleyball Third Division: 1

2017/2018

== Roster ==
Season 2020–2021, as of September 2020.

Number	Player	Position	Height (m)	Weight (kg)	Birth date
1	(Venezuela) José Rojas	Outside hitter	1.89	97	5 October 1992 (age 34)
3	(Brazil) Éder Levi	Middle blocker	2.06	103	4 July 1993 (age 33)
4	(Brazil) Victor Hugo	Middle blocker	1.99	92	2 August 1992 (age 34)
5	(Brazil) Paulo Victor	Opposite	1.98	102	12 May 1986 (age 40)
7	(Brazil) André Saliba	Opposite	2.01	91	27 August 1999 (age 27)
8	(Portugal) Miguel Maia	Setter	1.81	92	23 April 1971 (age 55)
9	(Portugal) José Vinha	Outside hitter	1.84	69	9 December 1994 (age 31)
10	(Brazil) Robinson Dvoranen	Outside hitter	2.01	88	23 December 1983 (age 42)
11	(Portugal) Gil Meireles	Libero	1.76	70	21 February 1995 (age 31)
13	(Portugal) Hugo Vinha	Setter	1.85	61	7 March 2001 (age 25)
15	(Portugal) André Sousa	Middle blocker	1.88	79	5 November 1995 (age 30)
16	(Brazil) Renan Purificação	Outside hitter	1.96	89	27 November 1991 (age 34)
17	(Portugal) João Fidalgo	Libero	1.72	67	2 November 1986 (age 39)
18	(Brazil) Bruno Alves	Setter	1.89	87	18 May 1989 (age 37)
19	(Cape Verde) Hélio Sanches	Middle blocker	2.01	93	10 May 1991 (age 35)
20	(Portugal) Miguel Sá	Libero	1.84	80	19 April 2000 (age 26)

== New Signings 23-24 Season ==
Name	Position	Height	Weight	Date of birth
(Venezuela) Jose Carrasco	Setter	1.93	87	20 May 1989 (age 34)
(United States) Kevin Kobrine	Opposite	1.95	80	27 January 2000 (age 23)
(Venezuela) Armando Velasquez	Setter	1.89	80	18 September 1988 (age 34)
(Czech Republic) Jan Galabov	Outside Hitter	1.93	89	12 June 1996 (age 27)
(Czech Republic) Martin Lieck	Outside Hitter	1.97	83	5 January 1995 (age 28)
