= Portuguese Volleyball Third Division =

Volleyball Division from Portugal

Portuguese Volleyball Third Division

The Portuguese Volleyball Third Division is the Third-level men's Volleyball League in Portugal, which is also called (Portuguese: "3a Divisão de Voleibol"). The competition is organized by the Federação Portuguesa de Voleibol.

== Portuguese 3rd Division Champions ==
Year	Final Standings
Year	Champion	Second Place	Third Place
1972/1973	Clube Infante Sagres
1973/1974	Castêlo da Maia GC
1974/1975	Banco Pinto Sotto Mayor
1975/1976	GD de Basquete de Leça
1976/1977	SC Esmoriz
1977/1978	GD Bairro Latino
1978/1979	Col. Int. Carvalhos
1979/1980	GDC Gueifães
1980/1981	GD de Basquete de Leça
1981/1982	Col. São João de Brito
1982/1983	Sporting Clube de Portugal
1983/1984	CD Póvoa
1984/1985	CD Póvoa
1985/1986	CD Nacional
1986/1987	Desp. Francisco da Holanda
1987/1988	Mosteiro FC|
1988/1989	CF Aliança
1989/1990	Mosteiro FC
1990/1991	SC Matosinhos
1991/1992	CCD Aldeia Nova
1992/1993	Castêlo da Maia GC “B”
1993/1994	GDC Gueifães “B”
1994/1995	CD Fiães
1995/1996	VC Viana
1996/1997	CD Póvoa
1997/1998	S.L. Benfica
1998/1999	GC Vilacondense
1999/2000	Associação Académica de Coimbra
2000/2001	CDUP
2001/2002	SC Espinho ”B”
2002/2003	CD Ribeirense “B”
2003/2004	CF Aliança
2004/2005	CCR Maceda	Oeiras	Academia AA
2005/2006	AA Universidade da Madeira	AA Coimbra
2006/2007	VC Viana	CAIC-Cernache
2007/2008	UTAD	Castelo Maia G.C.	AA Universidade da Madeira
2008/2009	CDRJ Andrade	AEIS Técnico	Rep. Madeira
2009/2010	CIR Laranjeiro	AA UTAD	AD Vila
2010/2011	Vitória Sport Clube “B”	CA Madalena	AA Alunos
2011/2012	CA Madalena	SO Marinhense	GC Stº Tirso
2012/2013	GC Stº Tirso	AD Machico	AD Castro Daire
2013/2014	VC Viana	SO Marinhense
2014/2015	CN Ginástica	AAA Esc. Amares
2015/2016	CN Ginástica “B”	AA José Moreira	SO Marinhense
2016/2017	GD Martingança	CN Ginástica “B”	AC Albufeira
2017/18	Esmoriz B	Benfica B	Arca d'Ajuda
2018/19	CD Póvoa	CV Lisboa	ADR Água de Pena
2019/20	Season cancelled due to COVID-19 pandemic
2020/21	CD Póvoa
2021/22	Famalicense AC
2022/23	GC Vilacondense	Juv. Évora

=== References ===
http://www.fpvoleibol.pt/campeoesnacionais.php
