= Portuguese Volleyball Cup =

- Current season, competition or edition: 2025–26
- Sport: Volleyball
- Founded: 1964
- First season: 1964–65
- Country: Portugal
- Confederation: CEV
- Most recent champion: Sporting CP (6th title)
- Most titles: Benfica (21 titles)
- Broadcaster: Sport TV
- Website: Federação Voleibol

The Portuguese Volleyball Cup (Taça de Portugal de Voleibol) is the men's volleyball cup in Portugal. It is played by teams of all Portuguese divisions, and is organized by the Portuguese Volleyball Federation. The current holders are Sporting CP, winning their sixth title.

== Winners ==
Season	Final
Season	Winners	Result	Runners-up
1964–65	S.C. Espinho	3–0 (15–7, 16–6, 15–10)	Académica Avintes
1965–66	Benfica	3–1 (15–4,15–11,12–15,15–10)	Lisboa e Ginásio
1966–67	Instituto Superior Técnico	3–2 (15–7, 15–5, 8–15, 11–15, 15–8)	Benfica
1967–68	FC Porto	3–1 (16–14, 13–15, 15–9, 15–13)	S.C. Espinho
1968–69	Leixões	3–0 (17–15, 15–5, 15–12)	Benfica
1969–70	FC Porto (2)	3–2 (15–10, 13–15, 9–15, 15–8, 15–13)	Benfica
1970–71	FC Porto (3)	3–2 (15–12, 9–15, 9–15, 15–13, 17–15)	Leixões
1971–72	FC Porto (4)	3–0 (15–6, 15–13, 15–11)	Benfica
1972–73	Leixões (2)	3–1 (15–5, 11–15, 15–5, 15–12)	S.C. Espinho
1973–74	Benfica (2)	3–1 (15–6, 15–11, 6–15, 16–14)	Leixões
1974–75	Benfica (3)	3–0 (15–4, 15–5, 15–10)	S.C. Espinho
1975–76	Benfica (4)	3–1 (13–15, 15–4, 15–13, 15–13)	FC Porto
1976–77	Leixões (3)	3–0 (15–4, 15–3, 15–8)	Instituto Superior Técnico
1977–78	Benfica (5)	3–0 (15–12, 15–10, 15–10)	FC Porto
1978–79	Benfica (6)	3–0 (15–4, 15–7, 15–11)	Atlético Madalena
1979–80	Benfica (7)	3–1 (9–15, 15–11, 15–8, 20–18)	Leixões
1980–81	S.C. Espinho (2)	3–2 (15–17, 15–8, 15–11, 13–15, 15–13)	Leixões
1981–82	Esmoriz	3–0 (15–12, 15–4, 15–12)	CDUL
1982–83	Leixões (4)	3–0 (15–12, 16–14, 15–6)	Esmoriz
1983–84	S.C. Espinho (3)	3–0 (15–10, 15–7, 15–13)	Esmoriz
1984–85	S.C. Espinho (4)	3–1 (15–9, 16–14, 9–15, 15–11)	Académica São Mamede
1985–86	ISEF Lisboa	3–2 (15–8, 11–15, 8–15, 15–10, 15–8)	S.C. Espinho
1986–87	FC Porto (5)	Table	Leixões
1987–88	FC Porto (6)	Table	Benfica
1988–89	Leixões (5)	3–1 (15–9, 6–15, 15–13, 15–12)	Sporting CP
1989–90	Benfica (8)	3–0 (15–4, 15–7, 15–11)	Leixões
1990–91	Sporting CP	3–0 (15–6, 15–13, 15–5)	AA Espinho
1991–92	Benfica (9)	3–2 (16–14, 9–15, 16–14, 6–15, 17–16)	Sporting CP
1992–93	Sporting CP (2)	3–0 (15–3, 15–4, 15–6)	C.D. Nacional
1993–94	Castêlo da Maia	3–2 (15–12, 15–8, 5–15, 12–15, 15–12)	Sporting CP
1994–95	Sporting CP (3)	3–0 (15–6, 15–4, 15–13)	S.C. Espinho
1995–96	S.C. Espinho (5)	3–0 (15–5, 15–5, 15–4)	Leixões
1996–97	S.C. Espinho (6)	3–0 (15–8, 15–13, 15–5)	Castêlo da Maia
1997–98	S.C. Espinho (7)	3–0 (15–11, 15–8, 15–10)	Castêlo da Maia
1998–99	S.C. Espinho (8)	3–0 (15–10, 15–13, 15–6)	Castêlo da Maia
1999–2000	S.C. Espinho (9)	3–0 (25–18, 25–18, 25–20)	Leixões
2000–01	S.C. Espinho (10)	3–0 (25–23, 25–22, 25–23)	C.D. Nacional
2001–02	Castêlo da Maia (2)	3–0 (25–21, 25–20, 25–18)	Leixões
2002–03	Castêlo da Maia (3)	3–0 (25–21, 25–23, 25–16)	Vitória S.C.
2003–04	Castêlo da Maia (4)	3–0 (27–25, 25–14, 25–21)	Vitória S.C.
2004–05	Benfica (10)	3–2 (22–25, 23–25, 25–14, 25–16, 16–14)	Esmoriz
2005–06	Benfica (11)	3–0 (25–19, 25–19, 25–22)	S.C. Espinho
2006–07	Benfica (12)	3–0 (25–23, 27–25, 25–23)	Castêlo da Maia
2007–08	S.C. Espinho (11)	3–0 (25–22, 25–22, 25–22)	Vitória S.C.
2008–09	Vitória S.C.	3–2 (25–22, 16–25, 25–22, 18–25 15–7)	S.C. Espinho
2009–10	Castêlo da Maia (5)	3–1 (26–24, 21–25, 25–19, 25–23)	Benfica
2010–11	Benfica (13)	3–0 (25–22, 25–18, 25–19)	S.C. Espinho
2011–12	Benfica (14)	3–1 (21–25, 25–12, 25–16, 25–12)	AA Espinho
2012–13	Fonte do Bastardo	3–0 (25–20, 25–15, 25–21)	Vitória S.C.
2013–14	Castêlo da Maia (6)	3–2 (22–25, 20–25, 25–22, 25–17, 15–10)	Fonte do Bastardo
2014–15	Benfica (15)	3–0 (20–25, 19–25, 14–25)	S.C. Espinho
2015–16	Benfica (16)	3–1 (25–19, 20–25, 25–19, 25–17)	Fonte do Bastardo
2016–17	S.C. Espinho (12)	3–0 (25–18, 25–19, 25–22)	Benfica
2017–18	Benfica (17)	3–1 (24–26, 25–18, 25–22, 25–12)	Castêlo da Maia
2018–19	Benfica (18)	3–1 (26–28, 25–16, 25–22, 25–20)	Fonte do Bastardo
2019–20	No champion (COVID-19 pandemic)
2020–21	Sporting CP (4)	3–1 (29–27, 25–22, 16–25, 28–26)	Benfica
2021–22	Benfica (19)	3–1 (20–25, 25–23, 25–18, 25–22)	Fonte do Bastardo
2022–23	Benfica (20)	3–0 (25–21, 25–19, 25–18)	Fonte do Bastardo
2023–24	Sporting CP (5)	3–2 (25–16, 20–25, 25–22, 20–25, 22–20)	Fonte do Bastardo
2024–25	Benfica (21)	3–0 (25–22, 27–26, 25–19)	Leixões
2025–26	Sporting CP (6)	3–2 (25–22, 26–28, 25–23, 21–25, 23–21)	Benfica

== Titles by club ==
Club	Winners	Runners-up	Years won	Years runner-up
Benfica	21	9	1966, 1974, 1975, 1976, 1978, 1979, 1980, 1990, 1992, 2005, 2006, 2007, 2011, 2012, 2015, 2016, 2018, 2019, 2022, 2023, 2025	1967, 1969, 1970, 1972, 1988, 2010, 2017, 2021, 2026
S.C. Espinho	12	9	1965, 1981, 1984, 1985, 1996, 1997, 1998, 1999, 2000, 2001, 2008, 2017	1968, 1973, 1975, 1986, 1995, 2006, 2009, 2011, 2015
Castêlo da Maia	6	5	1994, 2002, 2003, 2004, 2010, 2014	1997, 1998, 1999, 2007, 2018
Sporting CP	6	3	1991, 1993, 1995, 2021, 2024, 2026	1989, 1992, 1994
FC Porto	6	2	1968, 1970, 1971, 1972, 1987, 1988	1976, 1978
Leixões	5	10	1969, 1973, 1977, 1983, 1989	1971, 1974, 1980, 1981, 1987, 1990, 1996, 2000, 2002, 2025
Fonte do Bastardo	1	6	2013	2014, 2016, 2019, 2022, 2023, 2024
Vitória S.C.	1	4	2009	2003, 2004, 2008, 2013
Esmoriz	1	3	1982	1983, 1984, 2005
Instituto Superior Técnico	1	1	1967	1977
ISEF Lisboa	1	0	1986	–
C.D. Nacional	0	2	–	1993, 2001
AA Espinho	0	2	–	1991, 2012
Académica Avintes	0	1	–	1965
Lisboa e Ginásio	0	1	–	1966
Atlético Madalena	0	1	–	1979
CDUL	0	1	–	1982
Académica São Mamede	0	1	–	1985
