= Famalicense Atlético Clube =

- Full name: Famalicense Atlético Clube.png
- League: 1ª Divisão
- Founded: 1937; 88 years ago
- Home ground: Pavilhão Municipal de Vila Nova de Famalicão; Portugal (Capacity 3,000)

Personnel
- Coach: (Portugal) Jorge Ferreira
- Chairman: (Portugal) Sofia Machado Ruivo
- Website: famalicenseac.com

Famalicense Atlético Clube (FAC) is a sports club from Vila Nova de Famalicão, Portugal. It has basketball, futsal, rink hockey, volleyball, badminton, snooker, gymnastics and chess departments. The under 16 Basketball team recently reached the final of "Taça do Minho" losing to ATC by one point.
