= Leixões SC (volleyball) =

Leixões Sport Club
- Short name: Leixões SC
- Ground: Matosinhos, Portugal
- Manager: (Portugal)
- League: A1 - Portugal
- 2011-12 season: 7th
- Website: Club home page

Uniforms
Home	Away

Leixões Sport Club is the volleyball team of Leixões Sport Club, based in Matosinhos, Portugal. It plays in Portuguese Volleyball First Division.

== Honours ==
- Portuguese Volleyball First Division: 8

1963–64, 1971–72, 1973–74, 1975–76, 1978–79, 1979–80, 1981–82, 1988–89

- Portuguese Volleyball Cup: 5

1968–69, 1972–73, 1976–77, 1982–83, 1988–89

- Portuguese Volleyball Super Cup: 1

1989
