= 2023–24 CEV Challenge Cup =

European club volleyball competition

- League: CEV Challenge Cup
- Sport: Volleyball
- Duration: 24 October 2023 – 27 February 2024

Finals
- Champions: (Poland) Projekt Warsaw
- Finals MVP: (Ukraine) Yurii Semeniuk

CEV Challenge Cup seasons
- ← 2022–23 2024–25 →

The 2023–24 CEV Challenge Cup was the 44th edition of the third tier European volleyball club competition organised by the European Volleyball Confederation.

Projekt Warsaw won the title by beating Vero Volley Monza in the final.

== Format ==
Qualification round (Home and away matches):

- 32nd finals

Main phase (Home and away matches):

- 16th finals → 8th finals → Quarter-finals

Final phase (Home and away matches):

- Semi-finals → Finals

Aggregate score is counted as follows: 3 points for 3–0 or 3–1 win, 2 points for 3–2 win, 1 point for 2–3 loss.
In case the teams are tied after two legs, a Golden Set is played immediately at the completion of the second leg.

== Qualified teams ==
(Albania) VK Tirana	(Austria) UVC Weberzeile Ried im Innkreis	(Austria) VCA Amstetten NÖ	(Azerbaijan) Khari Byul-Byul Shusha
(Bulgaria) Deya Volley Burgas	(Bulgaria) Levski Sofia	(Croatia) Ribola Kaštela	(Cyprus) Omonia Nicosia
(Czech Republic) Aero Odolena Voda	(Faroe Islands) Mjølnir Klaksvík	(Finland) Akaa-Volley	(France) Narbonne Volley
(France) Saint-Nazaire Atlantic Volleyball	(Germany) Helios Grizzlys Giesen	(Greece) Panathinaikos	(Greece) AOP Kifisias Athens
(Hungary) MÁV Előre SC Székesfehérvár	(Hungary) Pénzügyőr SE Budapest	(Israel) Hapoel Mate-Asher Akko	(Israel) Hapoel Yoav Kfar Saba
(Israel) Maccabi Tel Aviv	(Italy) Vero Volley Monza	(Luxembourg) VC Lorentzweiler	(Luxembourg) VC Strassen
(Netherlands) Active Living Orion Doetinchem	(Netherlands) Numidia VC Limax Linne	(Norway) Førde VBK	(Norway) Viking TIF Bergen
(Poland) Projekt Warsaw	(Portugal) Fonte Bastardo Azores	(Portugal) Sporting CP Lisboa	(Romania) Dinamo București
(Romania) Steaua București	(Serbia) Ribnica Kraljevo	(Slovakia) Rieker UJS Komárno	(Slovakia) TJ Spartak Myjava
(Slovenia) Calcit Kamnik	(Slovenia) Merkur Maribor	(Slovenia) Panvita Pomgrad Murska Sobota	(Slovenia) Triglav Kranj
(Spain) CV Melilla MSC	(Spain) Pamesa Teruel	(Switzerland) Volley Näfels	(Turkey) Galatasaray Istanbul
(Serbia) OK Spartak Subotica (Note: Spartak Subotica qualified after winning the BVA Cup)	(N/A) ~~WEVZA Cup Winner~~		

== Draw ==
The draw was held in Luxembourg on 19 July 2023.

== 32nd finals ==
Team 1	Agg.	Team 2	1st leg	2nd leg	Golden Set
Panvita Pomgrad Murska Sobota (Slovenia)	3–3	(Cyprus) Omonia Nicosia	3–2	2–3	15–5
MÁV Előre SC Székesfehérvár (Hungary)	6–0	(Austria) VCA Amstetten NÖ	3–0	3–0	
Merkur Maribor (Slovenia)	0–6	(Finland) Akaa-Volley	1–3	1–3	
Bye	–	(Spain) CV Melilla MSC	–	–	
Maccabi Tel Aviv (Israel)	0–6	(Albania) VK Tirana	w/o	w/o	
VC Lorentzweiler (Luxembourg)	0–6	(Romania) Steaua București	1–3	0–3	
Calcit Kamnik (Slovenia)	6–0	(Norway) Viking TIF Bergen	3–0	3–0	
Triglav Kranj (Slovenia)	0–6	(Bulgaria) Deya Volley Burgas	1–3	1–3	
~~WEVZA Cup Winner~~	–	(Israel) Hapoel Mate-Asher Akko	–	–	
Mjølnir Klaksvík (Faroe Islands)	0–6	(Netherlands) Numidia VC Limax Linne	1–3	0–3	
Khari Byul-Byul Shusha (Azerbaijan)	6–0	(Slovakia) TJ Spartak Myjava	3–0	3–1	
Bye	–	(Portugal) Sporting CP Lisboa	–	–	
OK Spartak Subotica (Serbia)	6–0	(Norway) Førde VBK	3–0	3–0	
Rieker UJS Komárno (Slovakia)	4–2	(Luxembourg) VC Strassen	2–3	3–1	
Hapoel Yoav Kfar Saba (Israel)	0–6	(Hungary) Pénzügyőr SE Budapest	w/o	w/o	
Bye	–	(Greece) AOP Kifisias Athens	–	–	

== 16th finals ==
Team 1	Agg.	Team 2	1st leg	2nd leg	Golden Set
Panvita Pomgrad Murska Sobota (Slovenia)	3–3	(Spain) Pamesa Teruel	3–1	0–3	10–15
MÁV Előre SC Székesfehérvár (Hungary)	5–1	(Switzerland) Volley Näfels	3–2	3–1	
Akaa-Volley (Finland)	5–1	(Serbia) OK Ribnica Kraljevo	3–2	3–1	
CV Melilla MSC (Spain)	1–5	(Czech Republic) Aero Odolena Voda	0–3	2–3	
VK Tirana (Albania)	0–6	(Germany) Helios Grizzlys Giesen	1–3	0–3	
Steaua București (Romania)	5–1	(Austria) UVC Weberzeile Ried im Innkreis	3–1	3–2	
Calcit Kamnik (Slovenia)	0–6	(Poland) Projekt Warsaw	0–3	0–3	
Deya Volley Burgas (Bulgaria)	0–6	(France) Saint-Nazaire VB Atlantique	1–3	0–3	
Hapoel Mate-Asher Akko (Israel)	0–6	(Bulgaria) Levski Sofia	w/o	w/o	
Numidia VC Limax Linne (Netherlands)	2–4	(Romania) Dinamo București	0–3	3–2	
Khari Byul-Byul Shusha (Azerbaijan)	0–6	(Greece) Panathinaikos	0–3	1–3	
Sporting CP Lisboa (Portugal)	1–5	(Italy) Vero Volley Monza	2–3	0–3	
OK Spartak Subotica (Serbia)	0–6	(Portugal) Fonte Bastardo Azores	0–3	1–3	
Rieker UJS Komárno (Slovakia)	6–0	(Netherlands) Active Living Orion Doetinchem	3–1	3–0	
Pénzügyőr SE Budapest (Hungary)	4–2	(Croatia) Ribola Kaštela	3–0	2–3	
AOP Kifisias Athens (Greece)	0–6	(Turkey) Galatasaray Istanbul	0–3	0–3	

== 8th finals ==
Team 1	Agg.	Team 2	1st leg	2nd leg
Pamesa Teruel (Spain)	6–0	(Hungary) MÁV Előre SC Székesfehérvár	3–0	3–0
Akaa-Volley (Finland)	6–0	(Czech Republic) Aero Odolena Voda	3–1	3–1
Helios Grizzlys Giesen (Germany)	2–4	(Romania) Steaua București	3–2	1–3
Projekt Warsaw (Poland)	6–0	(France) Saint-Nazaire Atlantic Volleyball	3–0	3–1
Levski Sofia (Bulgaria)	4–2	(Romania) Dinamo București	3–0	2–3
Panathinaikos (Greece)	1–5	(Italy) Vero Volley Monza	2–3	0–3
Fonte Bastardo Azores (Portugal)	5–1	(Slovakia) Rieker UJS Komárno	3–2	3–1
Pénzügyőr SE Budapest (Hungary)	0–6	(Turkey) Galatasaray	1–3	0–3

== Quarter-finals ==
Team 1	Agg.	Team 2	1st leg	2nd leg
Pamesa Teruel (Spain)	0–6	(Finland) Akaa-Volley	0–3	1–3
Steaua București (Romania)	0–6	(Poland) Projekt Warsaw	0–3	0–3
Levski Sofia (Bulgaria)	0–6	(Italy) Vero Volley Monza	0–3	0–3
Fonte Bastardo Azores (Portugal)	0–6	(Turkey) Galatasaray	0–3	1–3

== Semi-finals ==
Team 1	Agg.	Team 2	1st leg	2nd leg
Akaa-Volley (Finland)	0–6	(Poland) Projekt Warsaw	0–3	1–3
Vero Volley Monza (Italy)	5–1	(Turkey) Galatasaray	3–0	3–2

== Finals ==
Team 1	Agg.	Team 2	1st leg	2nd leg
Projekt Warsaw (Poland)	6–0	(Italy) Vero Volley Monza	3–1	3–1

== See also ==
- 2023–24 CEV Champions League
- 2023–24 CEV Cup
- 2023–24 CEV Women's Champions League
- 2023–24 Women's CEV Cup
- 2023–24 CEV Women's Challenge Cup
