= 2022–23 CEV Challenge Cup =

- League: CEV Challenge Cup
- Sport: Volleyball
- Duration: 11 October 2022 – 15 March 2023
- Total attendance: 51,838 (836 per match)

Finals
- Champions: (Greece) Olympiacos Piraeus
- Finals MVP: (Italy) Dragan Travica (OLY)

CEV Challenge Cup seasons
- ← 2021–22 2023–24 →

The 2022–23 CEV Challenge Cup was the 43rd edition of the third tier European volleyball club competition organised by the European Volleyball Confederation.

== Participating teams ==
The draw was held on 28 June 2022 in Luxembourg City.

Rank	Country	Number of teams	Teams
5	Czech Republic	1	Aero Odolena Voda
6	Portugal	2	AJ Fonte Bastardo Azores, Sporting CP
7	Belgium	1	Aalst
8	Romania	1	Steaua
9	Switzerland	2	Näfels, Lausanne
10	Bulgaria	2	Burgas, Montana
11	Finland	2	Akaa, Tiikerit
12	Austria	2	Amstetten, Ried Volleyball
13	Netherlands	1	Doetinchem
15	Estonia	2	Parnu, Tartu
16	Hungary	1	VRC Kazincbarcia
17	Greece	4	Milon, Olympiacos Piraeus, PAOK Thessaloniki, Panathinaikos Athens
19	Ukraine	2	Epicentr Podolyany, Prometey
20	Croatia	2	Ribola Kastela, Varazdin
21	Spain	2	Guaguas, Melilla
23	Bosnia and Herzegovina	1	Borac Banja Luka
24	Norway	1	Viking
26	Slovenia	2	Maribor, Pomgrad
28	Cyprus	1	Omonoia
29	Israel	3	Hapoel Kfar Saba, Hapoel Mate Asher, Maccabi Tel Aviv,
30	Albania	1	SK Tirana
32	Kosovo	1	Ferizaj
35	Slovakia	3	Komárno, Prešov, Myjava
37	Luxembourg	2	Bartreng, Stroosen
41	Azerbaijan	1	Murov

== Format ==
Qualification round (Home and away matches):

- 32nd Finals

Main phase (Home and away matches):

- 16th Finals → 8th Finals → 4th Finals

Final phase (Home and away matches):

- Semifinals → Finals

Aggregate score is counted as follows: 3 points for 3–0 or 3–1 win, 2 points for 3–2 win, 1 point for 2–3 loss.
In case the teams are tied after two legs, a Golden Set is played immediately at the completion of the second leg.

== Qualification round ==
=== 32nd Finals ===
Team 1	Agg.	Team 2	1st leg	2nd leg	Golden Set
Maccabi Tel Aviv (Israel)	6–0	(Kosovo) Ferizaj	3–0	3–0	
PAOK Thessaloniki (Greece)	6–0	(Switzerland) Näfels	3–1	3–1	
Ried Volleyball (Austria)	0–6	(Cyprus) Omonoia	1–3	0–3	
Hapoel Kfar Saba (Israel)	4–2	(Austria) Amstetten	3–1	2–3	
Epicentr Podolyany (Ukraine)	4–2	(Slovenia) Maribor	3–0	2–3	
Komárno (Slovakia)	6–0	(Albania) SK Tirana	3–1	3–1	
Guaguas (Spain)	3–3	(Bulgaria) Burgas	3–1	1–3	13–15
Milon (Greece)	1–5	(Israel) Hapoel Mate Asher	2–3	1–3	
Pomgrad (Slovenia)	2–4	(Finland) Tiikerit	3–2	1–3	
Varaždin (Croatia)	0–6	(Azerbaijan) Murov	0–3	1–3	
Bartreng (Luxembourg)	0–6	(Luxembourg) Stroosen	1–3	1–3	
Myjava (Slovakia)	0–6	(Greece) Panathinaikos Athens	1–3	1–3	

==== First leg ====
Date	Time		Score		Set 1	Set 2	Set 3	Set 4	Set 5	Total	Report
11 Oct	20:00	Ferizaj (Kosovo)	0–3	(Israel) Maccabi Tel Aviv	5–25	9–25	9–25			23–75	Report
12 Oct	19:00	PAOK Thessaloniki (Greece)	3–1	(Switzerland) Näfels	20–25	25–20	25–15	25–13		95–73	Report
12 Oct	19:30	Ried (Austria)	1–3	(Cyprus) Omonoia	19–25	26–24	22–25	14–25		81–99	Report
11 Oct	19:00	Amstetten (Austria)	1–3	(Israel) Hapoel Kfar Saba	25–21	20–25	21–25	18–25		84–96	Report
12 Oct	18:00	Epicentr Podolyany (Ukraine)	3–0	(Slovenia) Maribor	25–12	25–16	25–18			75–46	Report
12 Oct	19:00	Komárno (Slovakia)	3–1	(Albania) SK Tirana	25–21	25–12	20–25	25–18		95–76	Report
12 Oct	18:00	Guaguas (Spain)	3–1	(Bulgaria) Burgas Volley	23–25	25–12	30–28	25–13		103–78	Report
12 Oct	20:00	Milon (Greece)	2–3	(Israel) Hapoel Mate Asher	25–17	18–25	25–16	14–25	8–15	90–98	Report
12 Oct	19:00	Pomgrad (Slovenia)	3–2	(Finland) Tiikerit	19–25	20–25	25–22	26–24	18–16	108–112	Report
19 Oct	18:00	Varaždin (Croatia)	0–3	(Azerbaijan) Murov	19–25	18–25	20–25			57–75	Report
12 Oct	19:00	Bartreng (Luxembourg)	1–3	(Luxembourg) Stroosen	22–25	18–25	25–14	17–25		82–89	Report
11 Oct	19:00	Myjava (Slovakia)	1–3	(Greece) Panathinaikos Athens	16–25	11–25	25–21	14–25		66–96	Report

==== Second leg ====
Date	Time		Score		Set 1	Set 2	Set 3	Set 4	Set 5	Total	Report
12 Oct	20:00	Maccabi Tel Aviv (Israel)	3–0	(Kosovo) Ferizaj	25–2	25–14	25–11			75–27	Report
19 Oct	19:00	Näfels (Switzerland)	1–3	(Greece) PAOK Thessaloniki	16–25	15–20	25–23	18–25		74–93	Report
13 Oct	19:30	Omonoia (Cyprus)	3–0	(Austria) Ried	25–18	32–30	22–25	25–20		104–93	Report
12 Oct	16:30	Hapoel Kfar Saba (Israel)	2–3	(Austria) Amstetten	29–27	25–22	19–25	20–25	7–15	100–114	Report
19 Oct	19:00	Maribor (Slovenia)	2–3	(Ukraine) Epicentr Podolyany	29–27	25–21	13–25	14–25	8–15	89–113	Report
19 Oct	19:00	SK Tirana (Albania)	1–3	(Slovakia) Komárno	25–18	16–25	19–25	21–25		81–93	Report
20 Oct	19:00	Burgas Volley (Bulgaria)	3–1	(Spain) Guaguas	23–25	25–22	25–18	25–22		98–87	Report
Golden set		Burgas Volley (Bulgaria)	15–13	(Spain) Guaguas							
20 Oct	19:00	Hapoel Mate Asher (Israel)	3–1	(Greece) Milon	25–13	25–16	18–25	23–25–16		91–79	Report
20 Oct	18:30	Tiikerit (Finland)	3–1	(Slovenia) Pomgrad	25–16	20–25	25–17	25–21		95–79	Report
20 Oct	18:00	Murov (Azerbaijan)	3–1	(Croatia) Varaždin	23–25	25–18	25–20	25–17		98–80	Report
19 Oct	19:30	Stroosen (Luxembourg)	3–1	(Luxembourg) Bartreng	25–23	13–25	25–21	25–20		88–89	Report
11 Oct	19:00	Panathinaikos Athens (Greece)	3–1	(Slovakia) Myjava	25–16	25–17	26–28	25–23		101–84	Report

== Main phase ==
=== 16th Finals ===
Team 1	Agg.	Team 2	1st leg	2nd leg
VRC Kazincbarcia (Hungary)	0–6	(Israel) Maccabi Tel Aviv	1–3	1–3
PAOK Thessaloniki (Greece)	6–0	(Bulgaria) Montana Volley	3–0	3–1
Omonia Nicosia (Cyprus)	5–1	(Croatia) Ribola Kaštela	3–2	3–1
Hapoel Kfar Saba (Israel)	0–6	(Belgium) Aalst	1–3	0–3
Prešov (Slovakia)	2–4	(Estonia) Tartu	3–2	0–3
AJ Fonte Bastardo Azores (Portugal)	6–0	(Finland) Akaa	3–0	3–0
Epicentr Podolyany (Ukraine)	0–6	(Spain) Melilla	0–3	0–3
Parnu (Estonia)	0–6	(Portugal) Sporting CP	0–3	0–3
Komárno (Slovakia)	0–6	(Greece) Olympiacos Piraeus	1–3	0–3
Burgas (Bulgaria)	6–0	(Switzerland) Lausanne	3–1	3–1
Hapoel Mate Asher (Israel)	6–0	(Ukraine) Prometey	3–1	3–1
Tiikerit (Finland)	1–5	(Romania) Steaua	2–3	0–3
Stroosen (Luxembourg)	0–6	(Netherlands) Doetinchem	0–3	0–3
Graz (Austria)	0–6	(Azerbaijan) Murov	0–3	0–3
Viking (Norway)	6–0	(Bosnia and Herzegovina) Borac Banja Luka	3–0	3–0
Panathinaikos Athens (Greece)	6–0	(Czech Republic) Odolena Voda	3–0	3–1

==== First leg ====
Date	Time		Score		Set 1	Set 2	Set 3	Set 4	Set 5	Total	Report
17 Nov	18:00	Maccabi Tel Aviv (Israel)	3–1	(Hungary) VRC Kazincbarcia	23–25	25–16	25–13	25–19		98–73	Report
9 Nov	19:00	PAOK Thessaloniki (Greece)	3–0	(Bulgaria) Montana Volley	25–19	25–15	25–16			75–50	Report
15 Nov	17:30	Omonia Nicosia (Cyprus)	3–2	(Croatia) Ribola Kaštela	20–25	25–19	23–25	25–16	15–12	108–97	Report
9 Nov	19:00	Hapoel Kfar Saba (Israel)	1–3	(Belgium) Aalst	23–25	18–25	26–24	23–25		90–99	Report
8 Nov	18:00	Prešov (Slovakia)	3–2	(Estonia) Tartu	22–25	23–25	26–24	25–20	15–10	111–104	Report
9 Nov	20:30	AJ Fonte Bastardo Azores (Portugal)	3–0	(Finland) Akaa	26–24	25–18	25–20			76–62	Report
10 Nov	18:00	Epicentr Podolyany (Ukraine)	0–3	(Spain) Melilla	15–25	21–25	22–25			58–75	Report
9 Nov	19:00	Parnu (Estonia)	0–3	(Portugal) Sporting CP	17–25	12–25	14–25			43–75	Report
9 Nov	19:00	Komárno (Slovakia)	1–3	(Greece) Olympiacos Piraeus	18–25	25–16	24–26	19–25		86–92	Report
8 Nov	19:00	Burgas (Bulgaria)	3–1	(Switzerland) Lausanne	27–25	25–12	19–25	25–17		96–79	Report
8 Nov	19:00	Hapoel Mate Asher (Israel)	3–1	(Ukraine) Prometey	25–16	25–21	21–25	25–20		96–82	Report
9 Nov	18:30	Tiikerit (Finland)	2–3	(Romania) Steaua	20–25	25–16	18–25	25–23	9–15	97–104	Report
9 Nov	19:00	Stroosen (Luxembourg)	0–3	(Netherlands) Doetinchem	20–25	20–25	22–25			62–75	Report
9 Nov	18:00	Murov (Azerbaijan)	3–0	(Austria) Graz	25–13	25–12	25–23			75–48	Report
9 Nov	19:00	Viking (Norway)	3–0	(Bosnia and Herzegovina) Borac Banja Luka	25–18	25–16	25–18			75–52	Report
9 Nov	18:00	Panathinaikos Athens (Greece)	3–0	(Czech Republic) Odolena Voda	25–19	25–14	25–19			75–52	Report

==== Second leg ====
Date	Time		Score		Set 1	Set 2	Set 3	Set 4	Set 5	Total	Report
16 Nov	18:00	VRC Kazincbarcia (Hungary)	1–3	(Israel) Maccabi Tel Aviv	25–22	21–25	16–25	16–25		78–97	Report
16 Nov	18:00	Montana Volley (Bulgaria)	1–3	(Greece) PAOK Thessaloniki	20–25	16–25	25–23	20–25		81–98	Report
16 Nov	17:30	Ribola Kaštela (Croatia)	1–3	(Cyprus) Omonia Nicosia	20–25	15–25	25–18	22–25		82–93	Report
16 Nov	20:30	Aalst (Belgium)	3–0	(Israel) Hapoel Kfar Saba	25–18	25–17	25–20			75–55	Report
16 Nov	19:00	Tartu (Estonia)	3–0	(Slovakia) Prešov	25–23	25–14	25–23			75–60	Report
16 Nov	18:30	Akaa (Finland)	0–3	(Portugal) AJ Fonte Bastardo Azores	21–25	22–25	22–25			65–75	Report
16 Nov	20:00	Melilla (Spain)	3–0	(Ukraine) Epicentr Podolyany	25–19	25–21	25–21			75–61	Report
16 Nov	19:30	Sporting CP (Portugal)	3–0	(Estonia) Parnu	25–17	25–15	25–19			75–51	Report
16 Nov	19:00	Olympiacos Piraeus (Greece)	3–0	(Slovakia) Komárno	25–12	25–21	25–21			75–54	Report
16 Nov	19:00	Lausanne (Switzerland)	1–3	(Bulgaria) Burgas	25–22	16–25	15–25	19–25		75–97	Report
10 Nov	19:00	Prometey (Ukraine)	1–3	(Israel) Hapoel Mate Asher	32–30	22–25	20–25	26–28		100–108	Report
16 Nov	18:00	Steaua (Romania)	3–0	(Finland) Tiikerit	25–21	25–21	25–17			75–59	Report
16 Nov	20:00	Doetinchem (Netherlands)	3–0	(Luxembourg) Stroosen	25–18	25–8	25–13			75–39	Report
8 Nov	19:00	Graz (Austria)	0–3	(Azerbaijan) Murov	13–25	18–25	23–25			54–75	Report
10 Nov	19:00	Borac Banja Luka (Bosnia and Herzegovina)	0–3	(Norway) Viking	16–25	16–25	18–25			50–75	Report
16 Nov	18:00	Odolena Voda (Czech Republic)	1–3	(Greece) Panathinaikos Athens	25–15	21–25	21–25	19–25		86–90	Report

=== 8th Finals ===
Team 1	Agg.	Team 2	1st leg	2nd leg
Maccabi Tel Aviv (Israel)	5–1	(Greece) PAOK Thessaloniki	3–1	3–2
Omonia Nicosia (Cyprus)	5–1	(Belgium) Aalst	3–1	3–2
Tartu (Estonia)	0–6	(Portugal) AJ Fonte Bastardo Azores	1–3	1–3
Melilla (Spain)	2–4	(Portugal) Sporting CP	3–2	1–3
Olympiacos Piraeus (Greece)	4–2	(Bulgaria) Burgas	3–0	2–3
Hapoel Mate Asher (Israel)	2–4	(Romania) Steaua	3–2	1–3
Doetinchem (Netherlands)	6–0	(Azerbaijan) Murov	3–1	3–1
Viking (Norway)	0–6	(Greece) Panathinaikos Athens	0–3	0–3

==== First leg ====
Date	Time		Score		Set 1	Set 2	Set 3	Set 4	Set 5	Total	Report
1 Dec	20:00	Maccabi Tel Aviv (Israel)	3–1	(Greece) PAOK Thessaloniki	25–27	25–22	25–17	32–30		107–96	Report
29 Nov	20:00	Omonia Nicosia (Cyprus)	3–1	(Belgium) Aalst	25–19	27–25	16–25	25–22		93–91	Report
30 Nov	19:00	Tartu (Estonia)	1–3	(Portugal) AJ Fonte Bastardo Azores	21–25	14–25	25–20	19–25		79–95	Report
30 Nov	18:00	Melilla (Spain)	3–2	(Portugal) Sporting CP	21–25	32–30	25–21	19–25	15–11	112–112	Report
30 Nov	19:00	Olympiacos Piraeus (Greece)	3–0	(Bulgaria) Burgas	25–19	25–22	25–18			75–59	Report
30 Nov	19:00	Hapoel Mate Asher (Israel)	3–2	(Romania) Steaua	19–25	15–25	25–23	25–19	15–13	99–105	Report
1 Dec	20:00	Doetinchem (Netherlands)	3–1	(Azerbaijan) Murov	29–27	19–25	25–12	25–19		98–83	Report
1 Dec	19:00	Viking (Norway)	0–3	(Greece) Panathinaikos Athens	20–25	17–25	23–25			60–75	Report

==== Second leg ====
Date	Time		Score		Set 1	Set 2	Set 3	Set 4	Set 5	Total	Report
15 Dec	20:00	PAOK Thessaloniki (Greece)	2–3	(Israel) Maccabi Tel Aviv	15–25	25–21	21–25	26–24	13–15	100–110	Report
14 Dec	20:30	Aalst (Belgium)	2–3	(Cyprus) Omonia Nicosia	25–18	21–25	25–22	22–25	11–15	104–105	Report
14 Dec	20:30	AJ Fonte Bastardo Azores (Portugal)	3–1	(Estonia) Tartu	25–17	22–25	25–11	25–13		97–66	Report
14 Dec	19:30	Sporting CP (Portugal)	3–1	(Spain) Melilla	29–27	25–19	19–25	25–17		98–88	Report
13 Dec	19:00	Burgas (Bulgaria)	3–2	(Greece) Olympiacos Piraeus	27–29	23–25	25–18	30–28	18–16	123–116	Report
15 Dec	18:00	Steaua (Romania)	3–1	(Israel) Hapoel Mate Asher	24–26	25–13	25–19	25–20		99–78	Report
15 Dec	18:00	Murov (Azerbaijan)	1–3	(Netherlands) Doetinchem	23–25	25–22	23–25	22–25		93–97	Report
14 Dec	21:00	Panathinaikos Athens (Greece)	3–0	(Norway) Viking	25–18	25–14	25–16			75–48	Report

=== 4th Finals ===
Team 1	Agg.	Team 2	1st leg	2nd leg	Golden Set
Maccabi Tel Aviv (Israel)	6–0	(Cyprus) Omonia Nicosia	3–0	3–1	
AJ Fonte Bastardo Azores (Portugal)	5–1	(Portugal) Sporting CP	3–0	3–2	
Olympiacos Piraeus (Greece)	5–1	(Romania) Steaua	3–1	3–2	
Doetinchem (Netherlands)	3–3	(Greece) Panathinaikos Athens	1–3	3–0	12–15

==== First leg ====
Date	Time		Score		Set 1	Set 2	Set 3	Set 4	Set 5	Total	Report
12 Jan	20:00	Maccabi Tel Aviv (Israel)	3–0	(Cyprus) Omonia Nicosia	25–21	25–20	25–16			75–57	Report
11 Jan	20:30	AJ Fonte Bastardo Azores (Portugal)	3–0	(Portugal) Sporting CP	26–24	25–19	25–21			76–64	Report
10 Jan	17:00	Olympiacos Piraeus (Greece)	3–1	(Romania) Steaua	23–25	25–16	25–16	25–19		98–76	Report
11 Jan	20:00	Doetinchem (Netherlands)	1–3	(Greece) Panathinaikos Athens	27–25	23–25	21–25	22–25		93–100	Report

==== Second leg ====
Date	Time		Score		Set 1	Set 2	Set 3	Set 4	Set 5	Total	Report
26 Jan	20:00	Omonia Nicosia (Cyprus)	1–3	(Israel) Maccabi Tel Aviv	22–25	23–25	25–21	12–25		82–96	Report
25 Jan	19:30	Sporting CP (Portugal)	2–3	(Portugal) AJ Fonte Bastardo Azores	19–25	25–21	25–23	19–25	10–15	98–109	Report
26 Jan	18:00	Steaua (Romania)	2–3	(Greece) Olympiacos Piraeus	15–25	21–25	25–15	25–20	11–15	97–100	Report
25 Jan	17:30	Panathinaikos Athens (Greece)	0–3	(Netherlands) Doetinchem	22–25	23–25	20–25			65–75	Report
Golden set		Panathinaikos Athens (Greece)	15–12	(Netherlands) Doetinchem							

== Final phase ==
=== Semifinals ===
Team 1	Agg.	Team 2	1st leg	2nd leg	Golden Set
Maccabi Tel Aviv (Israel)	4–2	(Portugal) AJ Fonte Bastardo Azores	3–1	2–3	
Olympiacos Piraeus (Greece)	3–3	(Greece) Panathinaikos Athens	1–3	3–1	15–6

==== First leg ====
Date	Time		Score		Set 1	Set 2	Set 3	Set 4	Set 5	Total	Report
7 Feb	20:00	Maccabi Tel Aviv (Israel)	3–1	(Portugal) AJ Fonte Bastardo Azores	24–26	25–21	25–18	25–23		99–88	Report
7 Feb	20:00	Olympiacos Piraeus (Greece)	1–3	(Greece) Panathinaikos Athens	25–21	21–25	23–25	24–26		93–97	Report

==== Second leg ====
Date	Time		Score		Set 1	Set 2	Set 3	Set 4	Set 5	Total	Report
15 Feb	20:30	AJ Fonte Bastardo Azores (Portugal)	3–2	(Israel) Maccabi Tel Aviv	25–18	23–25	22–25	25–23	15–10	110–101	Report
16 Feb	14:30	Panathinaikos Athens (Greece)	1–3	(Greece) Olympiacos Piraeus	25–22	25–27	21–25	17–25		88–99	Report
Golden set		Panathinaikos Athens (Greece)	6–15	(Greece) Olympiacos Piraeus							

=== Finals ===
Team 1	Agg.	Team 2	1st leg	2nd leg
Maccabi Tel Aviv (Israel)	0–6	(Greece) Olympiacos Piraeus	0–3	0–3

==== First leg ====
Date	Time		Score		Set 1	Set 2	Set 3	Set 4	Set 5	Total	Report
5 Mar	20:30	Maccabi Tel Aviv (Israel)	0–3	(Greece) Olympiacos Piraeus	20–25	23–25	14–25			57–75	Report

==== Second leg ====
Date	Time		Score		Set 1	Set 2	Set 3	Set 4	Set 5	Total	Report
15 Mar	20:00	Olympiacos Piraeus (Greece)	3–0	(Israel) Maccabi Tel Aviv	25–16	25–21	25–16			75–53	Report

== Final standings ==
2022–23 CEV Challenge Cup winner

Olympiacos Piraeus
(1st title)

Alen Pajenk, Dimitris Komitoudis, Tonček Štern, Mateo Hasbala, Gustavo Bonatto, Nikolas Papangelopoulos, Rafail Koumentakis, Spyros Chandrinos, Nikos Zoupanis, Dragan Travica, Dimitris Tziavras, Crysostomos Koltsiakis, Anestis Dalakouras, Dimosthenis Linardos, Salvador Hidalgo Oliva
Head coach
Alberto Giuliani

Rank	Team
1st place, gold medalist(s)	(Greece) Olympiacos Piraeus
2nd place, silver medalist(s)	(Israel) Maccabi Tel Aviv
Semifinalists	(Greece) Panathinaikos Athens (Portugal) AJ Fonte Bastardo Azores

== Awards ==
- Most valuable player

(Italy) Dragan Travica (Olympiacos Piraeus)

- Best scorer

(Russia) Alexander Safonov (Maccabi Tel Aviv)

- Best spiker

(Netherlands) Jasper Wijkstra (Doetinchem)

- Best server

(Russia) Alexander Safonov (Maccabi Tel Aviv)

- Best blocker

(Israel) Viacheslav Batchkala (Maccabi Tel Aviv)

- Best setter

(Greece) Aggelos Georgiou (Panathinaikos Athens)

- Best receiver

(Azerbaijan) Vladislav Kunchenko (Murov)
