= Omonia V.C. =

Volleyball team

Omonia
- Full name: Omonia Nicosia Volleyball Club
- Nickname: Queen
- Short name: OMO
- Founded: 1948
- Ground: Eleftheria Indoor Hall; Nicosia, Cyprus
- Capacity: 6,800
- Chairman: (Cyprus) Loris Kiriakou
- Head Coach: (Cyprus) Savvas Savva (volleyball)
- League: Cyprus Volleyball Division 1
- 2018–19: 1st place

Omonia Volleyball Club or Omonia V.C. is the volleyball team of the Omonia Athletic Club based in Nicosia, the capital of Cyprus. It is a founding member of the Cyprus Volleyball Federation and has been participating at its competitions since its inception in 1978.

Omonia V.C. is ranked 77th (as of August 2022) in the Men's

== History ==
Omonia VC is one of the most successful volleyball clubs in Cyprus. The most notable player has been Panos Eracleous who served the club for 27 years, from 1987 until his retirement in 2014. Nowadays, the club owns its recent success to the so-called golden green generation which refers primarily to Aggelos Alexiou and the Petrakkides twins, Achilleas Petrakkides and the captain Sotos Petrakkides, who after spending some time in other local and foreign teams, returned to Omonia VC where they commenced their careers and conquered domestically. The peak of their reign has been the undefeated defense of their second consecutive domestic championship during the 2015–2016 season.

The manager of the team Savvas Savva, who is in charge since 2013, with a year's break as an assistant coach in 2018, had also commenced his career in Omonia VC where he served until his retirement. He is by far the most successful manager in the team's history as he has won 8 Cypriot Championships, 7 Cypriot Cups and 8 Supercups.

Omonia VC has a remarkable record of 29 consecutive wins in all domestic competitions which spans in three different seasons. The strike started on the 20/2/2015 at the 16th round of the 2014–2015 Cypriot championship season and ended on the 11/11/2016 at the 3rd round of the 2016–2017 season. During this period Omonia VC won 2 Championships, 1 Cup and 2 Super Cups. More recently, Omonia VC has set an undefeated record of 24 wins within a single season, gained them their 5th Championship. Moreover, the club holds another record, that of winning the 2020-2021 title undefeated with 24 wins.

== Current squad ==
Head coach: (Cyprus) Savvas Savva (Volleyball)

No.	Name	Date of birth	Position
1	(Cyprus) Achilleas Petrakidis	August 12, 1984 (age 42)	Opposite
3	(Cyprus) Sotiris Petrakidis	August 12, 1984 (age 42)	Middle-blocker
7	(Cyprus) Nikolas Eleftheriou	October 17, 1997 (age 29)	Outside-spiker
9	(Cyprus) Christodoulos Antoniades	December 27, 1986 (age 39)	Middle-blocker
11	(Cyprus) Christos Prodromou	October 26, 1995 (age 30)	Middle-blocker
12	(Cyprus) Angelos Alexiou	February 4, 1987 (age 39)	Middle-blocker
18	(Brazil) Bruno Henrique	May 18, 1989 (age 37)	Setter

== Cypriot Championship ==
The following table presents Omonia's performance at the Cyprus Volleyball Federation championships, for any campaigns adequate information was found.

Season	Cypriot Championship					
Season	Division	Position	Teams	Wins-Losses	Set	Points
1978	Div.1	8th	10			
1978–1979	Div.1	5th	8			
1979–1980	Div.1	5th	10			
1980–1981	Div.1	7th	10			
1981–1982	Div.1	7th	10			
1982–1983	Div.1	5th	10			
1983–1984	Div.1	4th	10			
1984–1985	Div.1	7th	10			
1985–1986	Div.1	8th	10			
1986–1987	Div.1	9th	10			
1987–1988	Div.2	1st				
1988–1999	Div.1	5th	10			
1989–1990	Div.1	7th	10			
1990–1991	Div.1	3rd	10			
1991–1992	Div.1	9th	10			
1992–1993	Div.2	1st				
1993–1994	Div.1	4th	10			
1994–1995	Div.1	3rd	11			
1995–1996	Div.1	5th	10			
1996–1997	Div.1	3rd	9			
1997–1998	Div.1	2nd	10			
1998–1999	Div.1	4th	10			
1999–2000	Div.1	7th	10			
2000–01	Div.1	6th	10			

Season	Cypriot Championship					
Season	Division	Position	Teams	Wins-Losses	Set	Points
2001–02	Div.1	4th	9			
2001–02	Div.1	4th	9			
2002–03	Div.1	4th	8			
2003–04	Div.1	7th	8			
2004–05	Div.1	7th	8			
2005–06	Div.1	3rd	8			
2006–07	Div.1	6th	9			
2007–08	Div.1	5th	10			
2008–09	Div.1	3rd	10			
2009–10	Div.1	3rd	8	12–8	41–30	32
2010–11	Div.1	4th	8	8–12	28–40	27
2011–12	Div.1	4th	7	6–12	21–38	24
2012–13	Div.1	5th	8	11–9	42–36	31
2013–14	Div.1	2nd	8	14–6	51–28	42
2014–15	Div.1	1st	8	18–2	56–12	53
2015–16	Div.1	1st	8	20–0	60–11	58
2016–17	Div.1	1st	8	16–4	49–19	48
2017–18	Div.1	2nd	8	15–4	47–21	46
2018–19	Div.1	1st	8	18–0	54–9	50
2019–20	Div.1	1st	Cancelled due to COVID-19 pandemic			
2020–21	Div.1	1st	9	24–0	72–10	69
2021–22	Div.1	1st	8	17-3	54-23	49
2022–23	Div.1	1st	9	17-0	51-8	49
2023–24	Div.1	1st	7	16-0	48-10	44

== Domestic finals ==
The following table presents the seasons where Omonia succeeded to qualify at the Cypriot Cup Final through knock-out phases or the Cypriot Super Cup and the results.

Cypriot Cup finals

Season	Winner	Result	Loser
1983–84	APOEL Nicosia	3–1	Omonia
1994–95	Anorthosis Famagusta	3–1	Omonia
1996-96	Pafiakos Paphos	3–1	Omonia
1997–98	Anorthosis Famagusta	3–0	Omonia
1998–99	Omonia	3–0	Pafiakos Paphos
2005–06	Omonia	3–2	Dionysos Stroumpiou
2008–09	Omonia	3–2	Anorthosis Famagusta
2011–12	Anorthosis Famagusta	3–1	Omonia
2013–14	Anorthosis Famagusta	3–2	Omonia
2015–16	Omonia	3–2	Nea Salamis Famagusta
2016–17	Pafiakos Paphos	3–2	Omonia
2017–18	Omonia	3–1	APOEL Nicosia
2018–19	Omonia	3–1	Pafiakos Paphos
2020-21	Omonia	3–0	E.N.P. Paralimni
2021–22	Omonia	3–2	Nea Salamis Famagusta
2022–23	Omonia	3–0	Anorthosis Famagusta
2023-24	Omonia	3–0	Pafiakos Paphos
2025–26	Pafiakos Paphos	3–2	Omonia

Cypriot Super Cup Finals

Season	Winner	Result	Loser
1995	Anorthosis Famagusta	3–0	Omonia
1999	Nea Salamis Famagusta	3–0	Omonia
2006	Pafiakos Paphos	3–0	Omonia
2009	Anorthosis Famagusta	3–2	Omonia
2014	Omonia	3–0	Anorthosis Famagusta
2015	Omonia	3–1	AEK Karava-Lampousa
2016	Omonia	3–0	Nea Salamis Famagusta
2017	Omonia	3–2	Pafiakos Paphos
2018	Omonia	3–2	Pafiakos Paphos
2019	Omonia	3–1	Pafiakos Paphos
2021	Omonia	3–0	E.N.P. Paralimni
2022	Nea Salamis Famagusta	3–2	Omonia
2023	Omonia	3–1	Anorthosis Famagusta
2024	Pafiakos Paphos	3–0	Omonia
2026	Omonia	3–1	Pafiakos Paphos

== European competitions ==
Omonia VC's first European success was the elimination of the Montenegrin team OK Sutjeska Nikšić when the current coach Savvas Savva was a teammate of the golden green generation that has won the 6 domestic championships. In a rare occasion, it was drawn to play against their biggest domestic rivals Anorthosis Famagusta where it successfully knocked them out from the competition. In its most successful European campaign, the club reached the quarterfinals of the 2022–23 CEV Challenge Cup.

Season	Competition	Round	Club	Home	Away	Aggregate	Golden set	Qual.
1984–85	CEV Challenge Cup	1st round	(Israel) Hapoel Mate Asher	0–3	0-3	0–6		
1999–00	CEV Challenge Cup	1st round	(Luxembourg) Volley 80 Pétange	1–3	0-3	0–6		
2002–03	CEV Challenge Cup	1st round	(Austria) Uniqa Salzburg	0–3	0-3	0–6		
2006–07	Top Teams Cup	Group stage	(Italy) Cimone Modena	-	1–3	3rd		
2006–07	Top Teams Cup	Group stage	(Austria) SK Posojilnica Aich/Dob	-	3–0	3rd		
2006–07	Top Teams Cup	Group stage	(Slovenia) Maribor	0–3	-	3rd		
2009–10	CEV Challenge Cup	1st round	(Montenegro) OK Sutjeska Nikšić	3–0	3-0	6–0		
2009–10	CEV Challenge Cup	2nd round	(Belgium) Aalst	3-1	0-3	3-4		
2010–11	CEV Challenge Cup	2nd round	(Belarus) Metallurg Zhlobin	1-3	0-3	1-6		
2014–15	CEV Challenge Cup	2nd round	(Cyprus) Anorthosis Famagusta	3–0	3-1	6–1		
2014–15	CEV Challenge Cup	1/16	(Czech Republic) Dukla Liberec	1-3	1-3	2-6		
2015–16	CEV Cup	1/16	(Poland) Jastrzębski Węgiel	3–0	3-0	6–0		
2015–16	CEV Cup	1/8	(Spain) CV Teruel	2-3	0-3	2-6		
2016-17	CEV Champions League	2nd qualification round	(Slovenia) ACH Volley Ljubljana	0-3	0-3	0-6		
2016-17	CEV Cup	1/16	(Serbia) OK Novi Pazar	2-3	0-3	2-6		
2017-18	CEV Champions League	2nd qualification round	(Montenegro) Jedinstvo Bemax Bijelo Polje	3–0	3-2	6–2		
2017-18	CEV Champions League	3rd qualification round	(Poland) Jastrzębski Węgiel	0-3	0-3	0-6		
2017-18	CEV Challenge Cup	1/16	(Switzerland) Volley Amriswil	3-2	0-3	3-5		
2018–19	CEV Challenge Cup	1/16	(Croatia) Ribola Kaštela	3–2	3-1	6–3		
2018–19	CEV Challenge Cup	1/8	(Russia) Belogorie Belgorod	0-3	0-3	0-6		
2019–20	CEV Challenge Cup	1/16	(Hungary) Pénzügyőr Budapest	0-3	0-3	0-6		
2020–21	CEV Challenge Cup	1/16	(North Macedonia) GIO Strumica	3–0	X	3–2		
2020–21	CEV Challenge Cup	1/8	(Turkey) Ziraat Bankası Ankara	X	X	W.O.		
2021–22	CEV Challenge Cup	1/16	(France) Narbonne Volley	0-3	2-3	2–6		
2022–23	CEV Challenge Cup	1/32	(Austria) Ried Im Innkers	3–0	3–1	6–0		
2022–23	CEV Challenge Cup	1/16	(Croatia) Ribola Kaštela	3–2	3–1	5-1		
2022–23	CEV Challenge Cup	1/8	(Belgium) Aalst	3-1	3-2	5-1		
2022–23	CEV Challenge Cup	1/4	(Israel) Maccabi Tel Aviv	1-3	0-3	0-6		
2023–24	CEV Challenge Cup	1/32	(Slovenia) Panvita Pomgrad	3-2	2-3	5-5	5-15	
2024-25	CEV Champions League	1st qualification round	(Serbia) Crvena Zvezda Beograd	0-3	0-3	0-6		
2024-25	CEV Cup	1/32	(Bosnia and Herzegovina) Radnik Bijeljina	3-0	3-1	6-0		
2024-25	CEV Cup	1/16	(Bulgaria) Deya Volley Burgas	3-1	0-3	3-3	15-12	
2024-25	CEV Cup	1/8	(Switzerland) Volley Amriswil	2-3	0-3	1-5		
2025–26	CEV Challenge Cup	1/16	(Czech Republic) Volejbal Brno	0-3	0-3	0-6		

== Honours ==
- Cypriot Championships
  - Winner (8): 2014–15, 2015–16, 2016–17, 2018–19, 2020–21, 2021-2022, 2022-2023, 2023-24
- Cyprus Cup:
  - Winner (10): 1998–99, 2005–06, 2008–09, 2015–16, 2017–18, 2018–19, 2020–21, 2021–22, 2022–23, 2023–24
- Cypriot Super Cup:
  - Winner (9): 2014, 2015, 2016, 2017, 2018, 2019, 2021, 2023, 2026
