= 2019–20 CEV Challenge Cup =

- League: CEV Challenge Cup
- Sport: Volleyball
- Duration: 7 November 2019 – 5 March 2020

Finals

CEV Challenge Cup seasons
- ← 2018–19 2020–21 →

The 2019–20 CEV Challenge Cup was the 40th edition of the CEV Challenge Cup tournament. 40 teams from 28 countries were participating in the competition. The tournament has been cancelled due to the COVID-19 pandemic.

== Participating teams ==
Rank	Country	Number of teams	Teams
2	Italy	1	Allianz Powervolley Milano
3	Turkey	2	Tokat Belediye Plevne (BVA Cup winner), Spor Toto SC Ankara
4	France	2	Montpellier Castelnau UC, Rennes Volley 35
5	Belgium	1	BDO Volley Haasrode Leuven
6	Czech Republic	2	Kladno Volejbal cz, VK ČEZ Karlovarsko
7	Switzerland	2	Lindaren Volley Luzern, Volley Schönenwerd
9	Romania	2	ACS Volei Municipal Zalău, S.C.M. "U" Craiova
11	Austria	3	UVC Holding Graz, Union Raiffeisen Waldviertel, UVC Weberzeile RIED i.I.
12	Netherlands	1	SAMEN. Lycurgus Groningen
13	Israel	1	Hapoel Yoav Kfar Saba
15	Belarus	1	Stroitel Minsk
17	Cyprus	1	Omonia Nicosia
18	Portugal	2	Fonte Bastardo Açores, Sporting CP
20	Croatia	1	Mladost Ribola Kaštela
21	Bulgaria	1	Hebar Pazardzhik
22	Slovakia	1	VKP SPU Nitra
22	Slovenia	1	Calcit Volley Kamnik
24	Estonia	2	Pärnu VK, Saaremaa VC
25	Denmark	1	Gentofte Volley
27	Kosovo	1	K.V. Luboteni Ferizaj
28	Poland	1	Aluron Virtu CMC Zawiercie
30	Montenegro	1	Budućnost Podgorica
31	Hungary	3	Fino Kaposvar, Pénzügyőr Budapest, VRC Kazincbarcika
32	Spain	1	Unicaja Costa de Almeria
34	Albania	2	Erzeni, Partizani
35	Luxembourg	1	CHEV Diekirch
51	North Macedonia	1	Vardar Skopje
55	Sweden	1	Linköpings VC

== Format ==
Qualification Phase (Knock-out with Home and Away Matches): 1st Round (if needed) → 2nd Round

Main Phase (Knock-out with Home and Away Matches): 1/16 Finals → 1/8 Finals→1/4 Finals

Final Phase (Knock-out with Home and Away Matches): Semi-Finals → Final

Aggregate score is counted as follows: 3 points for 3–0 or 3–1 wins, 2 points for 3–2 win, 1 point for 2–3 loss. In case the teams are tied after two legs, a Golden Set is played immediately at the completion of the second leg.

== Qualification phase ==
=== 2nd round ===
Team 1	Agg.	Team 2	1st leg	2nd leg	Golden Set
Linköpings VC (Sweden)	1–5	(Estonia) Pärnu VK	1–3	2–3	
Lindaren Volley Luzern (Switzerland)	4–2	(Luxembourg) CHEV Diekirch	3–1	2–3	
Fonte Bastardo Açores (Portugal)	0–6	(France) Rennes Volley 35	0–3	1–3	
Fino Kaposvar (Hungary)	6–0	(Austria) UVC Weberzeile RIED i.I.	3–1	3–1	
Union Raiffeisen Waldviertel (Austria)	3–3	(Romania) S.C.M. "U" Craiova	3–1	0–3	11–15
VK ČEZ Karlovarsko (Czech Republic)	6–0	(North Macedonia) Vardar Skopje	3–0	3–1	
Tokat Belediye Plevne (Turkey)	5–1	(Hungary) VRC Kazincbarcika	3–0	3–2	
Partizani (Albania)	0–6	(Albania) Erzeni	0–3	0–3	

==== First leg ====
Date	Time		Score		Set 1	Set 2	Set 3	Set 4	Set 5	Total	Report
13 Nov	19:00	Linköpings VC (Sweden)	1–3	(Estonia) Pärnu VK	19–25	25–14	21–25	26–28		91–92	Report
13 Nov	19:30	Lindaren Volley Luzern (Switzerland)	3–1	(Luxembourg) CHEV Diekirch	23–25	27–25	25–22	25–18		100–90	Report
13 Nov	20:30	Fonte Bastardo Açores (Portugal)	0–3	(France) Rennes Volley 35	18–25	22–25	23–25			63–75	Report
7 Nov	18:00	Fino Kaposvar (Hungary)	3–1	(Austria) UVC Weberzeile RIED i.I.	25–21	23–25	25–20	25–11		98–77	Report
12 Nov	19:00	Union Raiffeisen Waldviertel (Austria)	3–1	(Romania) S.C.M. "U" Craiova	29–27	25–17	16–25	25–22		95–91	Report
13 Nov	18:00	VK ČEZ Karlovarsko (Czech Republic)	3–0	(North Macedonia) Vardar Skopje	25–11	25–20	25–19			75–50	Report
13 Nov	19:00	Tokat Belediye Plevne (Turkey)	3–0	(Hungary) VRC Kazincbarcika	25–17	25–12	25–16			75–45	Report
13 Nov	18:00	Partizani (Albania)	0–3	(Albania) Erzeni	20–25	15–25	20–25			55–75	Report

==== Second leg ====
Date	Time		Score		Set 1	Set 2	Set 3	Set 4	Set 5	Total	Report
27 Nov	19:00	Pärnu VK (Estonia)	3–2	(Sweden) Linköpings VC	25–18	25–22	20–25	12–25	15–10	97–100	Report
28 Nov	19:30	CHEV Diekirch (Luxembourg)	3–2	(Switzerland) Lindaren Volley Luzern	24–26	24–26	25–17	26–24	15–9	114–102	Report
27 Nov	20:00	Rennes Volley 35 (France)	3–1	(Portugal) Fonte Bastardo Açores	29–27	25–23	21–25	25–22		100–97	Report
27 Nov	19:00	UVC Weberzeile RIED i.I. (Austria)	1–3	(Hungary) Fino Kaposvar	20–25	25–16	22–25	22–25		89–91	Report
27 Nov	18:00	S.C.M. "U" Craiova (Romania)	3–0	(Austria) Union Raiffeisen Waldviertel	25–19	25–22	25–19			75–60	Report
Golden set		S.C.M. "U" Craiova (Romania)	15–11	(Austria) Union Raiffeisen Waldviertel							
27 Nov	19:00	Vardar Skopje (North Macedonia)	1–3	(Czech Republic) VK ČEZ Karlovarsko	25–21	18–25	17–25	15–25		75–96	Report
27 Nov	19:00	VRC Kazincbarcika (Hungary)	2–3	(Turkey) Tokat Belediye Plevne	25–19	27–25	16–25	23–25	13–15	104–109	Report
4 Dec	19:00	Erzeni (Albania)	3–0	(Albania) Partizani	25–16	25–19	26–24			76–59	Report

- The match between Erzeni and Partizani has been postponed from 27 November to 4 December due to an earthquake that occurred in Albania

== Main phase ==
=== 16th finals ===
Team 1	Agg.	Team 2	1st leg	2nd leg	Golden Set
Erzeni (Albania)	0–6	(Italy) Allianz Powervolley Milano	0–3	0–3	
Pärnu VK (Estonia)	3–3	(Croatia) Mladost Ribola Kaštela	3–1	1–3	15–17
Saaremaa VC (Estonia)	6–0	(Israel) Hapoel Yoav Kfar Saba	3–1	3–0	
Unicaja Costa de Almeria (Spain)	5–1	(Austria) UVC Holding Graz	3–0	3–2	
S.C.M. "U" Craiova (Romania)	1–5	(Czech Republic) Kladno Volejbal cz	2–3	0–3	
Calcit Volley Kamnik (Slovenia)	3–3	(Portugal) Sporting CP	3–1	0–3	8–15
Pénzügyőr Budapest (Hungary)	6–0	(Cyprus) Omonia Nicosia	3–0	3–0	
Tokat Belediye Plevne (Turkey)	0–6	(Belgium) BDO Volley Haasrode Leuven	0–3	1–3	
Lindaren Volley Luzern (Switzerland)	0–6	(France) Montpellier Castelnau UC	0–3	0–3	
Fino Kaposvar (Hungary)	0–6	(Netherlands) SAMEN. Lycurgus Groningen	1–3	0–3	
Budućnost Podgorica (Montenegro)	2–4	(Slovakia) VKP SPU Nitra	3–2	0–3	
Rennes Volley 35 (France)	6–0	(Switzerland) Volley Schönenwerd	3–0	3–0	
Gentofte Volley (Denmark)	2–4	(Romania) ACS Volei Municipal Zalău	3–2	0–3	
VK ČEZ Karlovarsko (Czech Republic)	6–0	(Belarus) Stroitel Minsk	3–1	3–0	
Aluron Virtu CMC Zawiercie (Poland)	5–1	(Bulgaria) Hebar Pazardzhik	3–0	3–2	
K.V. Luboteni Ferizaj (Kosovo)	0–6	(Turkey) Spor Toto SC Ankara	0–3	0–3	

==== First leg ====
Date	Time		Score		Set 1	Set 2	Set 3	Set 4	Set 5	Total	Report
18 Dec	20:00	Erzeni (Albania)	0–3	(Italy) Allianz Powervolley Milano	9–25	15–25	7–25			31–75	Report
12 Dec	19:00	Pärnu VK (Estonia)	3–1	(Croatia) Mladost Ribola Kaštela	25–18	17–25	25–10	25–23		92–76	Report
11 Dec	19:00	Saaremaa VC (Estonia)	3–1	(Israel) Hapoel Yoav Kfar Saba	25–18	23–25	25–23	25–16		98–82	Report
11 Dec	20:30	Unicaja Costa de Almeria (Spain)	3–0	(Austria) UVC Holding Graz	25–22	25–23	25–11			75–56	Report
10 Dec	18:00	S.C.M. "U" Craiova (Romania)	2–3	(Czech Republic) Kladno Volejbal cz	25–20	25–27	25–14	22–25	11–15	108–101	Report
11 Dec	20:00	Calcit Volley Kamnik (Slovenia)	3–1	(Portugal) Sporting CP	25–18	25–15	23–25	25–20		98–78	Report
10 Dec	19:00	Pénzügyőr Budapest (Hungary)	3–0	(Cyprus) Omonia Nicosia	25–19	25–23	25–15			75–57	Report
10 Dec	19:00	Tokat Belediye Plevne (Turkey)	0–3	(Belgium) BDO Volley Haasrode Leuven	25–27	16–25	23–25			64–77	Report
11 Dec	19:30	Lindaren Volley Luzern (Switzerland)	0–3	(France) Montpellier Castelnau UC	19–25	25–27	9–25			53–77	Report
11 Dec	18:00	Fino Kaposvar (Hungary)	1–3	(Netherlands) SAMEN. Lycurgus Groningen	25–18	20–25	26–28	22–25		93–96	Report
12 Dec	19:00	Budućnost Podgorica (Montenegro)	3–2	(Slovakia) VKP SPU Nitra	25–17	19–25	21–25	25–20	15–12	105–99	Report
11 Dec	20:00	Rennes Volley 35 (France)	3–0	(Switzerland) Volley Schönenwerd	25–16	25–15	25–17			75–48	Report
11 Dec	19:00	Gentofte Volley (Denmark)	3–2	(Romania) ACS Volei Municipal Zalău	25–14	25–22	17–25	23–25	15–12	105–98	Report
10 Dec	18:00	VK ČEZ Karlovarsko (Czech Republic)	3–1	(Belarus) Stroitel Minsk	16–25	25–19	25–20	25–20		91–84	Report
11 Dec	17:30	Aluron Virtu CMC Zawiercie (Poland)	3–0	(Bulgaria) Hebar Pazardzhik	25–21	25–21	25–18			75–60	Report
12 Dec	19:00	K.V. Luboteni Ferizaj (Kosovo)	0–3	(Turkey) Spor Toto SC Ankara	11–25	15–25	13–25			39–75	Report

==== Second leg ====
Date	Time		Score		Set 1	Set 2	Set 3	Set 4	Set 5	Total	Report
19 Dec	20:00	Allianz Powervolley Milano (Italy)	3–0	(Albania) Erzeni	25–14	25–11	25–21			75–46	Report
18 Dec	18:00	Mladost Ribola Kaštela (Croatia)	3–1	(Estonia) Pärnu VK	23–25	25–23	25–19	25–21		98–88	Report
Golden set		Mladost Ribola Kaštela (Croatia)	17–15	(Estonia) Pärnu VK							
17 Dec	19:00	Hapoel Yoav Kfar Saba (Israel)	0–3	(Estonia) Saaremaa VC	22–25	23–25	17–25			62–75	Report
18 Dec	19:00	UVC Holding Graz (Austria)	2–3	(Spain) Unicaja Costa de Almeria	25–23	22–25	23–25	25–21	10–15	105–109	Report
18 Dec	19:00	Kladno Volejbal cz (Czech Republic)	3–0	(Romania) S.C.M. "U" Craiova	25–17	25–23	25–15			75–55	Report
17 Dec	20:00	Sporting CP (Portugal)	3–0	(Slovenia) Calcit Volley Kamnik	25–18	25–17	25–22			75–57	Report
Golden set		Sporting CP (Portugal)	15–8	(Slovenia) Calcit Volley Kamnik							
11 Dec	19:00	Omonia Nicosia (Cyprus)	0–3	(Hungary) Pénzügyőr Budapest	11–25	17–25	16–25			44–75	Report
17 Dec	20:30	BDO Volley Haasrode Leuven (Belgium)	3–1	(Turkey) Tokat Belediye Plevne	25–19	24–26	25–22	25–23		99–90	Report
18 Dec	20:00	Montpellier Castelnau UC (France)	3–0	(Switzerland) Lindaren Volley Luzern	25–20	25–18	25–13			75–51	Report
19 Dec	19:30	SAMEN. Lycurgus Groningen (Netherlands)	3–0	(Hungary) Fino Kaposvar	25–20	25–19	25–22			75–61	Report
18 Dec	18:00	VKP SPU Nitra (Slovakia)	3–0	(Montenegro) Budućnost Podgorica	25–18	25–14	25–14			75–46	Report
18 Dec	19:30	Volley Schönenwerd (Switzerland)	0–3	(France) Rennes Volley 35	18–25	17–25	17–25			52–75	Report
18 Dec	18:00	ACS Volei Municipal Zalău (Romania)	3–0	(Denmark) Gentofte Volley	25–20	25–20	25–19			75–59	Report
18 Dec	18:30	Stroitel Minsk (Belarus)	0–3	(Czech Republic) VK ČEZ Karlovarsko	19–25	13–25	18–25			50–75	Report
18 Dec	18:30	Hebar Pazardzhik (Bulgaria)	2–3	(Poland) Aluron Virtu CMC Zawiercie	21–25	25–18	25–20	20–25	9–15	100–103	Report
17 Dec	18:00	Spor Toto SC Ankara (Turkey)	3–0	(Kosovo) K.V. Luboteni Ferizaj	25–11	25–11	25–19			75–41	Report

=== 8th finals ===
Team 1	Agg.	Team 2	1st leg	2nd leg	Golden Set
Mladost Ribola Kaštela (Croatia)	0–6	(Italy) Allianz Powervolley Milano	0–3	0–3	
Saaremaa VC (Estonia)	4–2	(Spain) Unicaja Costa de Almeria	2–3	3–1	
Kladno Volejbal cz (Czech Republic)	2–4	(Portugal) Sporting CP	0–3	3–2	
Pénzügyőr Budapest (Hungary)	3–3	(Belgium) BDO Volley Haasrode Leuven	3–1	1–3	15–12
Montpellier Castelnau UC (France)	6–0	(Netherlands) SAMEN. Lycurgus Groningen	3–0	3–1	
Rennes Volley 35 (France)	6–0	(Slovakia) VKP SPU Nitra	3–0	3–1	
VK ČEZ Karlovarsko (Czech Republic)	6–0	(Romania) ACS Volei Municipal Zalău	3–0	3–1	
Aluron Virtu CMC Zawiercie (Poland)	3–3	(Turkey) Spor Toto SC Ankara	3–0	1–3	13–15

==== First leg ====
Date	Time		Score		Set 1	Set 2	Set 3	Set 4	Set 5	Total	Report
29 Jan	18:00	Mladost Ribola Kaštela (Croatia)	0–3	(Italy) Allianz Powervolley Milano	19–25	20–25	20–25			59–75	Report
29 Jan	19:00	Saaremaa VC (Estonia)	2–3	(Spain) Unicaja Costa de Almeria	25–23	21–25	25–23	26–28	13–15	110–114	Report
29 Jan	18:00	Kladno Volejbal cz (Czech Republic)	0–3	(Portugal) Sporting CP	25–27	17–25	23–25			65–77	Report
29 Jan	15:00	Pénzügyőr Budapest (Hungary)	3–1	(Belgium) BDO Volley Haasrode Leuven	26–24	25–23	18–25	25–14		94–86	Report
29 Jan	20:00	Montpellier Castelnau UC (France)	3–0	(Netherlands) SAMEN. Lycurgus Groningen	25–17	26–24	25–21			76–62	Report
12 Feb	20:00	Rennes Volley 35 (France)	3–0	(Slovakia) VKP SPU Nitra	25–18	25–17	25–21			75–56	Report
29 Jan	18:00	VK ČEZ Karlovarsko (Czech Republic)	3–0	(Romania) ACS Volei Municipal Zalău	25–15	25–20	25–20			75–55	Report
29 Jan	18:00	Aluron Virtu CMC Zawiercie (Poland)	3–0	(Turkey) Spor Toto SC Ankara	25–13	25–11	25–19			75–43	Report

==== Second leg ====
Date	Time		Score		Set 1	Set 2	Set 3	Set 4	Set 5	Total	Report
13 Feb	20:00	Allianz Powervolley Milano (Italy)	3–0	(Croatia) Mladost Ribola Kaštela	25–22	25–14	25–16			75–52	Report
13 Feb	20:30	Unicaja Costa de Almeria (Spain)	1–3	(Estonia) Saaremaa VC	20–25	19–25	25–19	16–25		80–94	Report
11 Feb	20:00	Sporting CP (Portugal)	2–3	(Czech Republic) Kladno Volejbal cz	25–20	23–25	25–15	14–25	12–15	99–100	Report
12 Feb	20:30	BDO Volley Haasrode Leuven (Belgium)	3–1	(Hungary) Pénzügyőr Budapest	26–24	25–23	25–27	35–33		111–107	Report
Golden set		BDO Volley Haasrode Leuven (Belgium)	12–15	(Hungary) Pénzügyőr Budapest							
12 Feb	20:00	SAMEN. Lycurgus Groningen (Netherlands)	1–3	(France) Montpellier Castelnau UC	20–25	25–22	14–25	26–28		85–100	Report
29 Jan	18:00	VKP SPU Nitra (Slovakia)	1–3	(France) Rennes Volley 35	18–25	25–22	20–25	21–25		84–97	Report
12 Feb	18:00	ACS Volei Municipal Zalău (Romania)	1–3	(Czech Republic) VK ČEZ Karlovarsko	20–25	20–25	25–19	23–25		88–94	Report
12 Feb	18:00	Spor Toto SC Ankara (Turkey)	3–1	(Poland) Aluron Virtu CMC Zawiercie	25–18	21–25	25–21	25–22		96–86	Report
Golden set		Spor Toto SC Ankara (Turkey)	15–13	(Poland) Aluron Virtu CMC Zawiercie							

=== 4th finals ===
Team 1	Agg.	Team 2	1st leg	2nd leg	Golden Set
Allianz Powervolley Milano (Italy)	6–0	(Estonia) Saaremaa VC	3–1	3–0	
Sporting CP (Portugal)	5–1	(Hungary) Pénzügyőr Budapest	3–0	3–2	
Rennes Volley 35 (France)	6–0	(France) Montpellier Castelnau UC	3–0	3–0	
Spor Toto SC Ankara (Turkey)	3–3	(Czech Republic) VK ČEZ Karlovarsko	3–0	1–3	15–12

==== First leg ====
Date	Time		Score		Set 1	Set 2	Set 3	Set 4	Set 5	Total	Report
5 Mar	18:00	Allianz Powervolley Milano (Italy)	3–1	(Estonia) Saaremaa VC	21–25	25–22	25–21	25–18		96–86	Report
5 Mar	20:00	Sporting CP (Portugal)	3–0	(Hungary) Pénzügyőr Budapest	25–18	25–18	25–21			75–57	Report
26 Feb	20:00	Rennes Volley 35 (France)	3–0	(France) Montpellier Castelnau UC	25–19	25–19	25–22			75–60	Report
25 Feb	18:00	Spor Toto SC Ankara (Turkey)	3–0	(Czech Republic) VK ČEZ Karlovarsko	25–22	25–19	25–19			75–60	Report

==== Second leg ====
Date	Time		Score		Set 1	Set 2	Set 3	Set 4	Set 5	Total	Report
4 Mar	19:00	Saaremaa VC (Estonia)	0–3	(Italy) Allianz Powervolley Milano	21–25	18–25	23–25			62–75	Report
25 Feb	19:00	Pénzügyőr Budapest (Hungary)	2–3	(Portugal) Sporting CP	18–25	25–22	25–19	22–25	8–15	98–106	Report
4 Mar	20:00	Montpellier Castelnau UC (France)	0–3	(France) Rennes Volley 35	17–25	12–25	21–25			50–75	Report
4 Mar	18:00	VK ČEZ Karlovarsko (Czech Republic)	3–1	(Turkey) Spor Toto SC Ankara	25–21	31–33	25–21	25–23		106–98	Report
Golden set		VK ČEZ Karlovarsko (Czech Republic)	12–15	(Turkey) Spor Toto SC Ankara							
