= 2017–18 CEV Champions League qualification =

This article shows the qualification phase for the 2018 CEV Champions League. 20 teams will enter qualification round. 12 teams have directly qualified to the League round based on the 2018 European Cups’ Ranking List.

== Qualification Summary ==
Rank	Country	Vacancies	Qualified teams
1	Russia	2	Zenit Kazan
1	Russia	2	Dinamo Moscow
2	Italy	2	Diatec Trentino
2	Italy	2	Cucine Lube Civitanova
3	Turkey	2	Halkbank Ankara
3	Turkey	2	Arkas Izmir
4	Poland	2	Zaksa Kędzierzyn-Koźle
4	Poland	2	PGE Skra Bełchatów
5	France	1	Chaumont Volley-Ball 52
6	Belgium	1	Knack Roeselare
7	Germany	1	Berlin Recycling Volleys
8	Greece	1	PAOK Thessaloniki
Qualification round		8	Lokomotiv Novosibirsk
Qualification round		8	Sir Sicoma Colussi Perugia
Qualification round		8	Fenerbahçe Istanbul
Qualification round		8	Jastrzębski Węgiel
Qualification round		8	Spacer's Toulouse
Qualification round		8	Noliko Maaseik
Qualification round		8	VfB Friedrichshafen
Qualification round		8	Ford Store Levoranta Sastamala

== Participating teams ==
- (Bosnia and Herzegovina) Mladost Brcko
- (Netherlands) Abiant Lycurgus
- (Russia) Lokomotiv Novosibirsk
- (Montenegro) Jedinstvo Bemax Bijelo Polje
- (Austria) Posojilnica AICH/DOB
- (Finland) Ford Store Levoranta Sastamala
- (Israel) Maccabi Tel Aviv
- (Italy) Sir Sicoma Colussi Perugia
- (Serbia) Vojvodina Novi Sad
- (Kosovo) Luboteni Ferizaj
- (Cyprus) Omonoia Nicosia
- (Czech Republic) Jihostroj České Budějovice
- (Bulgaria) Neftohimic 2010 Burgas
- (Germany) VfB Friedrichshafen
- (Slovenia) ACH Volley Ljubljana
- (France) Spacer's Toulouse
- (Belgium) Noliko Maaseik
- (Poland) Jastrzębski Węgiel
- (Turkey) Fenerbahçe Istanbul
- (Belarus) Shakhtior Soligorsk

== First round ==
- No first round matches

== Second round ==
- Home-Away matches.
  8 teams will play in the Second round
  Winners will advance to the Third round; losers will compete in 32nd Finals of 2018 CEV Cup
- All times are local

Team 1	Agg.	Team 2	1st leg	2nd leg
Mladost Brcko (Bosnia and Herzegovina)	0–6	(Slovenia) ACH Volley Ljubljana	0–3	0–3
Omonoia Nicosia (Cyprus)	5–1	(Montenegro) Jedinstvo Bemax Bijelo Polje	3–0	3–2
Maccabi Tel Aviv (Israel)	2–4	(Belarus) Shakhtior Soligorsk	3–2	0–3
Luboteni Ferizaj (Kosovo)	0–6	(Netherlands) Abiant Lycurgus	0–3	0–3

=== First leg ===
Date	Time		Score		Set 1	Set 2	Set 3	Set 4	Set 5	Total	Report
18 Oct	19:30	Mladost Brcko (Bosnia and Herzegovina)	0–3	(Slovenia) ACH Volley Ljubljana	19–25	17–25	19–25			55–75	Report
18 Oct	18:45	Omonoia Nicosia (Cyprus)	3–0	(Montenegro) Jedinstvo Bemax Bijelo Polje	25–22	25–16	25–15			75–53	Report
18 Oct	19:00	Maccabi Tel Aviv (Israel)	3–2	(Belarus) Shakhtior Soligorsk	25–22	25–20	21–25	15–25	16–14	102–106	Report
18 Oct	17:00	Luboteni Ferizaj (Kosovo)	0–3	(Netherlands) Abiant Lycurgus	16–25	19–25	13–25			48–75	Report

=== Second leg ===
Date	Time		Score		Set 1	Set 2	Set 3	Set 4	Set 5	Total	Report
22 Oct	17:00	ACH Volley Ljubljana (Slovenia)	3–0	(Bosnia and Herzegovina) Mladost Brcko	25–21	25–19	25–15			75–55	Report
22 Oct	20:00	Jedinstvo Bemax Bijelo Polje (Montenegro)	2–3	(Cyprus) Omonoia Nicosia	24–26	25–14	18–25	28–26	9–15	104–106	Report
22 Oct	18:00	Shakhtior Soligorsk (Belarus)	3–0	(Israel) Maccabi Tel Aviv	25–23	31–29	26–24			82–76	Report
26 Oct	19:00	Abiant Lycurgus (Netherlands)	3–0	(Kosovo) Luboteni Ferizaj	25–20	25–16	25–14			75–50	Report

== Third round ==
- Home-Away matches.
- 12 teams have received byes into the Third round.
- Winners will qualify to the League round; losers will compete in the 16th Finals of 2018 CEV Cup
- All times are local

Team 1	Agg.	Team 2	1st leg	2nd leg	Golden Set
ACH Volley Ljubljana (Slovenia)	0–6	(Russia) Lokomotiv Novosibirsk	0–3	0–3	
Shakhtior Soligorsk (Belarus)	0–6	(Italy) Sir Sicoma Colussi Perugia	1–3	0–3	
Posojilnica AICH/DOB (Austria)	0–6	(Turkey) Fenerbahçe Istanbul	0–3	0–3	
Omonoia Nicosia (Cyprus)	0–6	(Poland) Jastrzębski Węgiel	0–3	0–3	
Vojvodina Novi Sad (Serbia)	3–3	(France) Spacer's Toulouse	3–0	1–3	10–15
Abiant Lycurgus (Netherlands)	0–6	(Belgium) Noliko Maaseik	1–3	0–3	
Neftohimic 2010 Burgas (Bulgaria)	0–6	(Germany) VfB Friedrichshafen	1–3	0–3	
Ford Store Levoranta Sastamala (Finland)	3–3	(Czech Republic) Jihostroj České Budějovice	3–0	1–3	15–12

=== First leg ===
Date	Time		Score		Set 1	Set 2	Set 3	Set 4	Set 5	Total	Report
8 Nov	18:00	ACH Volley Ljubljana (Slovenia)	0–3	(Russia) Lokomotiv Novosibirsk	26–28	22–25	19–25			67–78	Report
8 Nov	19:00	Shakhtior Soligorsk (Belarus)	1–3	(Italy) Sir Sicoma Colussi Perugia	25–23	20–25	17–25	16–25		78–98	Report
8 Nov	20:20	Posojilnica AICH/DOB (Austria)	0–3	(Turkey) Fenerbahçe Istanbul	17–25	22–25	22–25			61–75	Report
8 Nov	20:00	Omonoia Nicosia (Cyprus)	0–3	(Poland) Jastrzębski Węgiel	26–28	13–25	16–25			55–78	Report
8 Nov	20:00	Vojvodina Novi Sad (Serbia)	3–0	(France) Spacer's Toulouse	25–22	25–23	25–21			75–66	Report
8 Nov	19:00	Abiant Lycurgus (Netherlands)	1–3	(Belgium) Noliko Maaseik	19–25	25–22	17–25	22–25		83–97	Report
8 Nov	19:00	Neftohimic 2010 Burgas (Bulgaria)	1–3	(Germany) VfB Friedrichshafen	19–25	19–25	28–26	18–25		84–101	Report
8 Nov	18:30	Ford Store Levoranta Sastamala (Finland)	3–0	(Czech Republic) Jihostroj České Budějovice	25–20	25–22	25–15			75–57	Report

=== Second leg ===
Date	Time		Score		Set 1	Set 2	Set 3	Set 4	Set 5	Total	Report
12 Nov	17:30	Lokomotiv Novosibirsk (Russia)	3–0	(Slovenia) ACH Volley Ljubljana	25–20	25–22	25–18			75–60	Report
12 Nov	18:00	Sir Sicoma Colussi Perugia (Italy)	3–0	(Belarus) Shakhtior Soligorsk	25–15	25–16	25–19			75–50	Report
12 Nov	17:00	Fenerbahçe Istanbul (Turkey)	3–0	(Austria) Posojilnica AICH/DOB	25–22	25–16	26–24			76–62	Report
12 Nov	17:30	Jastrzębski Węgiel (Poland)	3–0	(Cyprus) Omonoia Nicosia	25–17	25–19	25–16			75–52	Report
12 Nov	20:00	Spacer's Toulouse (France)	3–1	(Serbia) Vojvodina Novi Sad	20–25	25–22	25–19	25–23		95–89	Report
Golden set		Spacer's Toulouse (France)	15–10	(Serbia) Vojvodina Novi Sad							
12 Nov	15:00	Noliko Maaseik (Belgium)	3–0	(Netherlands) Abiant Lycurgus	25–21	25–17	25–23			75–61	Report
12 Nov	16:00	VfB Friedrichshafen (Germany)	3–0	(Bulgaria) Neftohimic 2010 Burgas	25–12	25–21	25–20			75–53	Report
12 Nov	18:00	Jihostroj České Budějovice (Czech Republic)	3–1	(Finland) Ford Store Levoranta Sastamala	25–21	25–17	18–25	25–20		93–83	Report
Golden set		Jihostroj České Budějovice (Czech Republic)	12–15	(Finland) Ford Store Levoranta Sastamala							

== League round ==
- Drawing of Pool will be held on November 16, 2017
