= 2018–19 CEV Challenge Cup =

- League: CEV Challenge Cup
- Sport: Volleyball
- Duration: 6 November 2018 – 27 March 2019

Finals
- Champions: (Russia) Belogorie Belgorod
- Runners-up: (Italy) Vero Volley Monza
- Finals MVP: Denis Zemchenok (Belogorie)

CEV Challenge Cup seasons
- ← 2017–18 2019–20 →

The 2018–19 CEV Challenge Cup was the 39th edition of the CEV Challenge Cup tournament, the former CEV Cup. 42 teams were participating from 28 countries.

== Participating teams ==
Rank	Country	Number of teams	Teams
1	Russia	1	Belogorie Belgorod
2	Italy	1	Vero Volley Monza
3	Turkey	2	Maliye Milli Piyango, Ziraat Bank Ankara
4	France	1	Stade Poitevin Poitiers
5	Belgium	1	Volley Haasrode Leuven
6	Czech Republic	1	Volejbal Brno
7	Switzerland	2	Chênois Geneve, Biogas Volley Näfels
8	Greece	1	Iraklis Thessaloniki
9	Romania	3	CSA Steaua București, Volei Municipal Zalau, Tricolorul LMV Ploiești
11	Austria	3	UVC Holding Graz, VCA Amstetten NÖ, VBK Wörther-See-Löwen Klagenfurt
11	Netherlands	1	Draisma Dynamo Apeldoorn
13	Israel	1	Hapoel Yoav Kfar Saba
14	Finland	2	Savo Volley Kuopio, Perungan Pojat Rovaniemi
15	Belarus	1	Stroitel Minsk
16	Serbia	1	Crvena Zvezda Beograd
17	Cyprus	2	Omonia Nicosia, Pafiakos Pafos
18	Portugal	4	Fonte Bastardo Açores, SC Caldas da Rainha, S.L. Benfica, Sporting CP
20	Croatia	1	Mladost Ribola Kaštela
21	Bulgaria	2	CSKA Sofia, Levski Sofia
23	Slovenia	1	Calcit Volley Kamnik
24	Estonia	2	Pärnu VK, Saaremaa VC
25	Bosnia and Herzegovina	1	Radnik Bijeljina
26	Denmark	1	Gentofte Volley
27	Kosovo	1	Luboteni Ferizaj
28	Norway	1	BK Tromsø
30	Montenegro	1	Budućnost Podgorica
31	Hungary	2	Fino Kaposvar, Pénzügyőr Budapest
34	Luxembourg	1	VC Fentange

== Format ==
Qualification Phase (Knock-out with Home and Away Matches): 1st Round (if needed) → 2nd Round

Main Phase (Knock-out with Home and Away Matches): 1/16 Finals → 1/8 Finals→1/4 Finals

Final Phase (Knock-out with Home and Away Matches): Semi-Finals → Final

Aggregate score is counted as follows: 3 points for 3–0 or 3–1 wins, 2 points for 3–2 win, 1 point for 2–3 loss. In case the teams are tied after two legs, a Golden Set is played immediately at the completion of the second leg.

== Qualification phase ==
=== 2nd round ===
Team 1	Agg.	Team 2	1st leg	2nd leg	Golden Set
Savo Volley Kuopio (Finland)	6–0	(Norway) BK Tromsø	3–0	3–0	
Saaremaa VC (Estonia)	4–2	(Denmark) Gentofte Volley	3–0	2–3	
Tricolorul LMV Ploiești (Romania)	– ^{1}	(Bulgaria) Levski Sofia	–	–	
Luboteni Ferizaj (Kosovo)	0–6	(Turkey) Ziraat Bank Ankara	0–3	0–3	
Budućnost Podgorica (Montenegro)	0–6	(Romania) Volei Municipal Zalau	0–3	0–3	
UVC Holding Graz (Austria)	3–3	(Hungary) Fino Kaposvar	3–0	1–3	15–11
VBK Wörther-See-Löwen Klagenfurt (Austria)	0–6	(Hungary) Pénzügyőr Budapest	0–3	0–3	
S.L. Benfica (Portugal)	6–0	(Cyprus) Pafiakos Pafos	3–0	3–0	
SC Caldas da Rainha (Portugal)	3–3	(Switzerland) Chênois Geneve	3–1	0–3	16–14
Sporting CP (Portugal)	6–0	(Luxembourg) VC Fentange	3–0	3–0	

^{1} Tricolorul LMV Ploiești withdrew and Levski Sofia advanced automatically.

==== First leg ====
Date	Time		Score		Set 1	Set 2	Set 3	Set 4	Set 5	Total	Report
7 Nov	18:30	Savo Volley Kuopio (Finland)	3–0	(Norway) BK Tromsø	25–12	25–15	25–9			75–36	Report
6 Nov	19:00	Saaremaa VC (Estonia)	3–0	(Denmark) Gentofte Volley	34–32	25–20	25–13			84–65	Report
8 Nov	19:00	Luboteni Ferizaj (Kosovo)	0–3	(Turkey) Ziraat Bank Ankara	13–25	18–25	20–25			51–75	Report
6 Nov	18:00	Budućnost Podgorica (Montenegro)	0–3	(Romania) Volei Municipal Zalau	16–25	22–25	18–25			56–75	Report
7 Nov	19:30	UVC Holding Graz (Austria)	3–0	(Hungary) Fino Kaposvar	25–18	25–21	25–18			75–57	Report
8 Nov	19:00	VBK Klagenfurt (Austria)	0–3	(Hungary) Pénzügyőr Budapest	16–25	23–25	23–25			62–75	Report
6 Nov	20:30	S.L. Benfica (Portugal)	3–0	(Cyprus) Pafiakos Pafos	25–16	25–20	25–15			75–51	Report
7 Nov	20:00	SC Caldas da Rainha (Portugal)	3–1	(Switzerland) Chênois Geneve	28–26	25–20	22–25	27–25		102–96	Report
7 Nov	20:00	Sporting CP (Portugal)	3–0	(Luxembourg) VC Fentange	25–23	25–20	25–19			75–62	Report

==== Second leg ====
Date	Time		Score		Set 1	Set 2	Set 3	Set 4	Set 5	Total	Report
14 Nov	19:00	BK Tromsø (Norway)	0–3	(Finland) Savo Volley Kuopio	16–25	11–25	13–25			40–75	Report
13 Nov	19:00	Gentofte Volley (Denmark)	3–2	(Finland) Saaremaa VC	25–21	22–25	15–25	25–22	15–13	102–106	Report
14 Nov	19:00	Ziraat Bank Ankara (Turkey)	3–0	(Kosovo) Luboteni Ferizaj	25–15	25–18	25–10			75–43	Report
13 Nov	18:00	Volei Municipal Zalau (Romania)	3–0	(Montenegro) Budućnost Podgorica	25–14	25–14	26–26			76–54	Report
15 Nov	18:00	Fino Kaposvar (Hungary)	3–1	(Austria) UVC Holding Graz	17–25	25–22	25–12	25–16		92–75	Report
Golden set		Fino Kaposvar (Hungary)	11–15	(Austria) UVC Holding Graz							
14 Nov	19:30	Pénzügyőr Budapest (Hungary)	3–0	(Austria) VBK Klagenfurt	25–20	25–20	25–20			75–60	Report
14 Nov	20:00	Pafiakos Pafos (Cyprus)	0–3	(Portugal) S.L. Benfica	20–25	20–25	15–25			55–75	Report
14 Nov	20:00	Chênois Geneve (Switzerland)	3–0	(Portugal) SC Caldas da Rainha	30–28	25–23	25–21			80–72	Report
Golden set		Chênois Geneve (Switzerland)	14–16	(Portugal) SC Caldas da Rainha							
14 Nov	19:00	VC Fentange (Luxembourg)	0–3	(Portugal) Sporting CP	12–25	15–25	12–25			39–75	Report

== Main phase ==
=== 16th finals ===
Team 1	Agg.	Team 2	1st leg	2nd leg	Golden Set
Pénzügyőr Budapest (Hungary)	0–6	(Russia) Belogorie Belgorod	0–3	0–3	
Mladost Ribola Kaštela (Croatia)	3–6	(Cyprus) Omonia Nicosia	2–3	1–3	
ACS Volei Municipal Zalau (Romania)	6–0	(Romania) CSA Steaua București	3–0	3–0	
S.L. Benfica (Portugal)	6–0	(Greece) Iraklis Petosferisi 2015 Thessaloniki	3–0	3–0	
UVC Holding Graz (Austria)	0–6	(Israel) Hapoel Yoav Kfar Saba	0–3	0–3	
CSKA Sofia (Bulgaria)	0–6	(Belgium) Volley Haasrode Leuven	1–3	0–3	
Levski Sofia (Bulgaria)	1–5	(Finland) Perungan Pojat Rovaniemi	1–3	2–3	
Saaremaa VC (Estonia)	1–5	(France) Stade Poitevin Poitiers	2–3	0–3	
SC Caldas da Rainha (Portugal)	3–3	(Netherlands) Draisma Dynamo Apeldoorn	0–3	3–1	12–15
Fonte Bastardo Açores (Portugal)	6–0	(Czech Republic) Volejbal Brno	3–1	3–1	
Sporting CP (Portugal)	4–2	(Belarus) Stroitel Minsk	3–1	2–3	
Ziraat Bankası Ankara (Turkey)	2–4	(Turkey) Maliye Milli Piyango Ankara	3–2	0–3	
Savo Volley Kuopio (Finland)	6–0	(Austria) VCA Amstetten NÖ	3–0	3–0	
Calcit Volley Kamnik (Slovenia)	4–2	(Switzerland) Biogas Volley Näfels	3–0	2–3	
Radnik Bijeljina (Bosnia and Herzegovina)	0–6	(Serbia) Crvena Zvezda Beograd	0–3	0–3	
Pärnu VK (Estonia)	0–6	(Italy) Vero Volley Monza	0–3	0–3	

==== First leg ====
Date	Time		Score		Set 1	Set 2	Set 3	Set 4	Set 5	Total	Report
28 Nov	20:00	Pénzügyőr Budapest (Hungary)	0–3	(Russia) Belogorie Belgorod	15–25	22–25	18–25			55–75	Report
27 Nov	19:00	Mladost Ribola Kaštela (Croatia)	2–3	(Cyprus) Omonia Nicosia	25–22	19–25	15–25	25–18	12–15	96–105	Report
28 Nov	18:00	ACS Volei Municipal Zalau (Romania)	3–0	(Romania) CSA Steaua București	25–21	25–22	25–16			75–59	Report
28 Nov	20:30	S.L. Benfica (Portugal)	3–0	(Greece) Iraklis Petosferisi 2015 Thessaloniki	25–15	25–23	25–23			75–61	Report
28 Nov	19:30	UVC Holding Graz (Austria)	0–3	(Israel) Hapoel Yoav Kfar Saba	18–25	20–25	26–28			64–78	Report
28 Nov	19:00	CSKA Sofia (Bulgaria)	1–3	(Belgium) Volley Haasrode Leuven	25–23	18–25	17–25	20–25		80–98	Report
29 Nov	20:30	Levski Sofia (Bulgaria)	1–3	(Finland) Perungan Pojat Rovaniemi	25–16	23–25	17–25	23–25		88–91	Report
27 Nov	19:00	Saaremaa VC (Estonia)	2–3	(France) Stade Poitevin Poitiers	19–25	23–25	27–25	25–23	10–15	104–113	Report
28 Nov	20:00	SC Caldas da Rainha (Portugal)	0–3	(Netherlands) Draisma Dynamo Apeldoorn	23–25	25–27	19–25			67–77	Report
29 Nov	20:45	Fonte Bastardo Açores (Portugal)	3–1	(Czech Republic) Volejbal Brno	25–16	25–23	23–25	25–11		98–75	Report
27 Nov	20:00	Sporting CP (Portugal)	3–1	(Belarus) Stroitel Minsk	25–19	25–23	25–27	25–17		100–86	Report
28 Nov	19:00	Ziraat Bankası Ankara (Turkey)	3–2	(Turkey) Maliye Milli Piyango Ankara	19–25	25–21	25–22	21–25	19–17	109–110	Report
28 Nov	18:30	Savo Volley Kuopio (Finland)	3–0	(Austria) VCA Amstetten NÖ	25–14	25–9	25–8			75–31	Report
28 Nov	20:00	Calcit Volley Kamnik (Slovenia)	3–0	(Switzerland) Biogas Volley Näfels	25–23	25–13	25–23			75–59	Report
27 Nov	19:30	Radnik Bijeljina (Bosnia and Herzegovina)	0–3	(Serbia) Crvena Zvezda Beograd	25–27	18–25	19–25			62–77	Report
28 Nov	19:00	Pärnu VK (Estonia)	0–3	(Italy) Vero Volley Monza	28–30	18–25	21–25			67–80	Report

==== Second leg ====
Date	Time		Score		Set 1	Set 2	Set 3	Set 4	Set 5	Total	Report
4 Dec	19:00	Belogorie Belgorod (Russia)	3–0	(Hungary) Pénzügyőr Budapest	25–16	25–12	25–17			75–45	Report
28 Nov	19:00	Omonia Nicosia (Cyprus)	3–1	(Croatia) Mladost Ribola Kaštela	16–25	25–18	25–17	25–19		91–79	Report
5 Dec	18:00	CSA Steaua București (Romania)	0–3	(Romania) ACS Volei Municipal Zalau	16–25	23–25	32–34			71–84	Report
6 Dec	19:30	Iraklis Petosferisi 2015 Thessaloniki (Greece)	0–3	(Portugal) S.L. Benfica	13–25	12–25	15–25			40–75	Report
5 Dec	19:30	Hapoel Yoav Kfar Saba (Israel)	3–0	(Austria) UVC Holding Graz	25–20	25–13	25–17			75–50	Report
5 Dec	19:30	Volley Haasrode Leuven (Belgium)	3–0	(Bulgaria) CSKA Sofia	25–23	25–16	25–21			75–60	Report
6 Dec	16:00	Perungan Pojat Rovaniemi (Finland)	3–2	(Bulgaria) Levski Sofia	25–21	19–25	25–18	23–25	15–13	107–102	Report
4 Dec	20:00	Stade Poitevin Poitiers (France)	3–0	(Estonia) Saaremaa VC	26–24	25–22	25–21			76–67	Report
6 Dec	19:30	Draisma Dynamo Apeldoorn (Netherlands)	1–3	(Portugal) SC Caldas da Rainha	25–19	21–25	17–25	21–25		84–94	Report
Golden set		Draisma Dynamo Apeldoorn (Netherlands)	15–12	(Portugal) SC Caldas da Rainha							
6 Dec	18:00	Volejbal Brno (Czech Republic)	1–3	(Portugal) Fonte Bastardo Açores	29–31	25–20	20–25	15–25		89–101	Report
5 Dec	19:00	Stroitel Minsk (Belarus)	3–2	(Portugal) Sporting CP	30–32	22–25	25–19	26–24	15–10	118–110	Report
5 Dec	18:00	Maliye Milli Piyango Ankara (Turkey)	3–0	(Turkey) Ziraat Bankası Ankara	25–17	25–23	25–23			75–63	Report
4 Dec	19:00	VCA Amstetten NÖ (Austria)	0–3	(Finland) Savo Volley Kuopio	14–25	16–25	16–25			46–75	Report
5 Dec	19:30	Biogas Volley Näfels (Switzerland)	3–2	(Slovenia) Calcit Volley Kamnik	26–28	25–23	25–19	23–25	15–10	114–105	Report
5 Dec	19:00	Crvena Zvezda Beograd (Serbia)	3–0	(Bosnia and Herzegovina) Radnik Bijeljina	25–17	25–18	25–18			75–53	Report
5 Dec	20:00	Vero Volley Monza (Italy)	3–0	(Estonia) Pärnu VK	25–21	25–22	25–19			75–62	Report

=== 8th finals ===
Team 1	Agg.	Team 2	1st leg	2nd leg	Golden Set
Belogorie Belgorod (Russia)	6–0	(Cyprus) Omonia Nicosia	3–0	3–0	
S.L. Benfica (Portugal)	6–0	(Romania) ACS Volei Municipal Zalau	3–0	3–1	
Volley Haasrode Leuven (Belgium)	2–4	(Israel) Hapoel Yoav Kfar Saba	3–2	1–3	
Stade Poitevin Poitiers (France)	6–0	(Finland) Perungan Pojat Rovaniemi	3–1	3–0	
Fonte Bastardo Açores (Portugal)	6–0	(Netherlands) Draisma Dynamo Apeldoorn	3–0	3–1	
Maliye Milli Piyango Ankara (Turkey)	3–3	(Portugal) Sporting CP	3–0	0–3	10–15
Savo Volley Kuopio (Finland)	2–4	(Slovenia) Calcit Volley Kamnik	3–2	0–3	
Crvena Zvezda Beograd (Serbia)	0–6	(Italy) Vero Volley Monza	0–3	1–3	

==== First leg ====
Date	Time		Score		Set 1	Set 2	Set 3	Set 4	Set 5	Total	Report
19 Dec	19:00	Belogorie Belgorod (Russia)	3–0	(Cyprus) Omonia Nicosia	25–17	25–14	25–11			75–42	Report
18 Dec	20:30	S.L. Benfica (Portugal)	3–0	(Romania) ACS Volei Municipal Zalau	25–21	26–24	25–20			76–65	Report
19 Dec	20:30	Volley Haasrode Leuven (Belgium)	3–2	(Israel) Hapoel Yoav Kfar Saba	23–25	25–19	21–25	25–18	15–13	109–100	Report
18 Dec	20:00	Stade Poitevin Poitiers (France)	3–1	(Finland) Perungan Pojat Rovaniemi	23–25	25–19	25–11	25–13		98–68	Report
19 Dec	20:30	Fonte Bastardo Açores (Portugal)	3–0	(Netherlands) Draisma Dynamo Apeldoorn	25–19	25–19	26–24			76–62	Report
19 Dec	18:00	Maliye Milli Piyango Ankara (Turkey)	3–0	(Portugal) Sporting CP	26–24	25–21	25–20			76–65	Report
18 Dec	18:30	Savo Volley Kuopio (Finland)	3–2	(Slovenia) Calcit Volley Kamnik	22–25	25–17	24–26	25–23	15–8	111–99	Report
18 Dec	19:00	Crvena Zvezda Beograd (Serbia)	0–3	(Italy) Vero Volley Monza	17–25	20–25	18–25			55–75	Report

==== Second leg ====
Date	Time		Score		Set 1	Set 2	Set 3	Set 4	Set 5	Total	Report
15 Jan	20:00	Omonia Nicosia (Cyprus)	0–3	(Russia) Belogorie Belgorod	16–25	18–25	16–25			50–75	Report
16 Jan	18:00	ACS Volei Municipal Zalau (Romania)	1–3	(Portugal) S.L. Benfica	25–23	15–25	19–25	22–25		81–98	Report
17 Jan	19:00	Hapoel Yoav Kfar Saba (Israel)	3–1	(Belgium) Volley Haasrode Leuven	17–25	25–21	25–22	25–17		92–85	Report
16 Jan	18:30	Perungan Pojat Rovaniemi (Finland)	0–3	(France) Stade Poitevin Poitiers	24–26	24–26	18–25			66–77	Report
17 Jan	19:30	Draisma Dynamo Apeldoorn (Netherlands)	1–3	(Portugal) Fonte Bastardo Açores	25–21	19–25	18–25	20–25		82–96	Report
16 Jan	20:00	Sporting CP (Portugal)	3–0	(Turkey) Maliye Milli Piyango Ankara	25–16	25–22	25–20			75–58	Report
Golden set		Sporting CP (Portugal)	15–10	(Turkey) Maliye Milli Piyango Ankara							
16 Jan	20:00	Calcit Volley Kamnik (Slovenia)	3–0	(Finland) Savo Volley Kuopio	25–23	25–15	25–17			75–55	Report
15 Jan	19:00	Vero Volley Monza (Italy)	3–1	(Serbia) Crvena Zvezda Beograd	25–20	25–27	25–19	25–20		100–86	Report

=== 4th finals ===
Team 1	Agg.	Team 2	1st leg	2nd leg	Golden Set
Belogorie Belgorod (Russia)	3–3	(Portugal) S.L. Benfica	3–0	0–3	15–12
Hapoel Yoav Kfar Saba (Israel)	3–3	(France) Stade Poitevin Poitiers	3–0	1–3	13–15
Sporting CP (Portugal)	4–2	(Portugal) Fonte Bastardo Açores	3–0	2–3	
Vero Volley Monza (Italy)	6–0	(Slovenia) Calcit Volley Kamnik	3–1	3–0	

==== First leg ====
Date	Time		Score		Set 1	Set 2	Set 3	Set 4	Set 5	Total	Report
30 Jan	19:00	Belogorie Belgorod (Russia)	3–0	(Portugal) S.L. Benfica	25–22	25–20	29–27			79–69	Report
30 Jan	19:45	Hapoel Yoav Kfar Saba (Israel)	3–0	(France) Stade Poitevin Poitiers	25–22	25–18	25–19			75–59	Report
29 Jan	20:00	Sporting CP (Portugal)	3–0	(Portugal) Fonte Bastardo Açores	35–33	25–20	25–22			85–75	Report
29 Jan	19:00	Vero Volley Monza (Italy)	3–1	(Slovenia) Calcit Volley Kamnik	23–25	25–17	25–20	25–18		98–80	Report

==== Second leg ====
Date	Time		Score		Set 1	Set 2	Set 3	Set 4	Set 5	Total	Report
13 Feb	20:30	S.L. Benfica (Portugal)	3–0	(Russia) Belogorie Belgorod	25–18	25–23	25–22			75–63	Report
Golden set		S.L. Benfica (Portugal)	12–15	(Russia) Belogorie Belgorod							
13 Feb	20:00	Stade Poitevin Poitiers (France)	3–1	(Israel) Hapoel Yoav Kfar Saba	25–23	30–28	22–25	25–21		102–97	Report
Golden set		Stade Poitevin Poitiers (France)	15–13	(Israel) Hapoel Yoav Kfar Saba							
13 Feb	20:30	Fonte Bastardo Açores (Portugal)	3–2	(Portugal) Sporting CP	17–25	22–25	25–23	25–20	15–13	104–106	Report
13 Feb	20:00	Calcit Volley Kamnik (Slovenia)	0–3	(Italy) Vero Volley Monza	25–27	18–25	23–25			66–77	Report

== Final phase ==
=== Semifinals ===
Team 1	Agg.	Team 2	1st leg	2nd leg
Belogorie Belgorod (Russia)	4–2	(France) Stade Poitevin Poitiers	3–0	2–3
Vero Volley Monza (Italy)	4–2	(Portugal) Sporting CP	2–3	3–0

==== First leg ====
Date	Time		Score		Set 1	Set 2	Set 3	Set 4	Set 5	Total	Report
27 Feb	19:00	Belogorie Belgorod (Russia)	3–0	(France) Stade Poitevin Poitiers	25–11	25–23	25–17			75–51	Report
27 Feb	20:30	Vero Volley Monza (Italy)	2–3	(Portugal) Sporting CP	26–24	25–12	22–25	22–25	8–15	103–101	Report

==== Second leg ====
Date	Time		Score		Set 1	Set 2	Set 3	Set 4	Set 5	Total	Report
6 Mar	20:00	Stade Poitevin Poitiers (France)	3–2	(Russia) Belogorie Belgorod	20–25	23–25	25–23	25–23	17–15	110–111	Report
6 Mar	17:00	Sporting CP (Portugal)	0–3	(Italy) Vero Volley Monza	20–25	23–25	17–25			60–75	Report

=== Finals ===
Team 1	Agg.	Team 2	1st leg	2nd leg
Vero Volley Monza (Italy)	2–4	(Russia) Belogorie Belgorod	3–2	0–3

==== First leg ====
Date	Time		Score		Set 1	Set 2	Set 3	Set 4	Set 5	Total	Report
20 Mar	20:30	Vero Volley Monza (Italy)	3–2	(Russia) Belogorie Belgorod	29–27	22–25	25–23	32–34	15–12	123–121	Report

==== Second leg ====
Date	Time		Score		Set 1	Set 2	Set 3	Set 4	Set 5	Total	Report
27 Mar	19:00	Belogorie Belgorod (Russia)	3–0	(Italy) Vero Volley Monza	27–25	25–19	25–19			77–63	Report
