= 2020–21 CEV Challenge Cup =

- League: CEV Challenge Cup
- Sport: Volleyball
- Duration: 8 October 2020 – 24 March 2021

Finals
- Champions: (Italy) Allianz Powervolley Milano
- Runners-up: (Turkey) Ziraat Bankası Ankara
- Finals MVP: (France) Jean Patry

CEV Challenge Cup seasons
- ← 2019–20 2021–22 →

The 2020–21 CEV Challenge Cup was the 41st edition of the CEV Challenge Cup tournament. 33 teams from 22 countries were participating in the competition.

== Participating teams ==
Rank	Country	Number of teams	Teams
1	Turkey	2	Halkbank Ankara (BVA Cup winner), Ziraat Bankası Ankara
3	Italy	1	Allianz Powervolley Milano
4	France	2	AS Cannes, Nantes Rezé Métropole
5	Czech Republic	1	VK Lvi Praha
7	Switzerland	2	Lausanne UC, Lindaren Volley Luzern
8	Portugal	3	Fonte Bastardo Açores, Sporting CP, Sport Lisboa e Benfica
9	Bulgaria	1	Marek Union Ivkoni Dupnitsa
11	Austria	3	UVC Holding Graz, Union Raiffeisen Waldviertel, UVC Weberzeile Ried
12	Finland	1	Tiikerit Kokkola
14	Romania	1	Dinamo București
15	Israel	1	Hapoel Kfar Saba
16	Serbia	1	OK Partizan Beograd
18	Germany	1	Helios Grizzlys Giesen
19	Norway	1	TIF Viking Bergen
20	Slovenia	1	Calcit Volley Kamnik
23	Cyprus	1	Omonia Nicosia
26	Ukraine	2	Barkom-Kazhany Lviv, Epicentr-Podoliany
27	Hungary	1	VRCK Kazincbarcika
29	Estonia	2	Pärnu VK, Saaremaa VK
46	Latvia	2	Jēkabpils Lūši, RTU-R Jurmala
50	North Macedonia	2	GIO Strumica, Vardar Skopje
55	Sweden	1	Sollentuna VK

== Format ==
Qualification Phase (Knock-out with Home and Away Matches): 1st Round (if needed) → 2nd Round

Main Phase (Knock-out with Home and Away Matches): 1/16 Finals → 1/8 Finals→1/4 Finals

Final Phase (Knock-out with Home and Away Matches): Semi-Finals → Final

Aggregate score is counted as follows: 3 points for 3–0 or 3–1 wins, 2 points for 3–2 win, 1 point for 2–3 loss. In case the teams are tied after two legs, a Golden Set is played immediately at the completion of the second leg.

== Qualification phase ==
=== 2nd round ===
Team 1	Agg.	Team 2	1st leg	2nd leg
UVC Holding Graz (Austria)	0–6	(Turkey) Halkbank Ankara	0–3	0–3

==== First leg ====
Date	Time		Score		Set 1	Set 2	Set 3	Set 4	Set 5	Total	Report
8 Oct	19:00	UVC Holding Graz (Austria)	0–3	(Turkey) Halkbank Ankara	16–25	26–28	21–25			63–78	Report

==== Second leg ====
Date	Time		Score		Set 1	Set 2	Set 3	Set 4	Set 5	Total	Report
15 Oct	17:30	Halkbank Ankara (Turkey)	3–0	(Austria) UVC Holding Graz	25–17	25–16	25–13			75–46	Report

== Main phase ==
=== 16th finals ===
Team 1	Agg.	Team 2	1st leg	2nd leg
Halkbank Ankara (Turkey)	6–0	(Israel) Hapoel Kfar Saba	3–1	3–0
VRCK Kazincbarcika (Hungary)	W.O.	(Portugal) Sport Lisboa e Benfica	Cancelled	Cancelled
Sollentuna VK (Sweden)	W.O.	(Norway) TIF Viking Bergen	Cancelled	Cancelled
AS Cannes (France)	2–1	(France) Nantes Rezé Métropole	Cancelled	3–2
Barkom-Kazhany Lviv (Ukraine)	1–2	(Romania) Dinamo București	2–3	Cancelled
UVC Weberzeile Ried (Austria)	0–6	(Bulgaria) Marek Union Ivkoni Dupnitsa	0–3	0–3
Vardar Skopje (North Macedonia)	0–6	(Slovenia) Calcit Volley Kamnik	0–3	0–3
Jēkabpils Lūši (Latvia)	W.O.	(Italy) Allianz Powervolley Milano	Cancelled	Cancelled
Epicentr-Podoliany (Ukraine)	W.O.	(Serbia) OK Partizan Beograd	Cancelled	Cancelled
Saaremaa VK (Estonia)	W.O.	(Switzerland) Lausanne UC	Cancelled	Cancelled
Sporting CP Lisboa (Portugal)	4–2	(Germany) Helios Grizzlys Giesen	3–0	2–3
RTU-R Jurmala (Latvia)	W.O.	(Czech Republic) VK Lvi Praha	Cancelled	Cancelled
Pärnu VK (Estonia)	W.O.	(Finland) Tiikerit Kokkola	Cancelled	Cancelled
Lindaren Volley Luzern (Switzerland)	0–3	(Austria) Union Raiffeisen Waldviertel	0–3	Cancelled
GIO Strumica (North Macedonia)	0–3	(Cyprus) Omonia Nicosia	0–3	Cancelled
Fonte Bastardo Açores (Portugal)	2–4	(Turkey) Ziraat Bankası Ankara	1–3	3–2

==== First leg ====
Date	Time		Score		Set 1	Set 2	Set 3	Set 4	Set 5	Total	Report
4 Nov	17:30	Halkbank Ankara (Turkey)	3–1	(Israel) Hapoel Kfar Saba	28–26	25–19	19–25	25–17		97–87	Report
4 Nov	19:00	Barkom-Kazhany Lviv (Ukraine)	2–3	(Romania) Dinamo București	25–22	25–19	21–25	22–25	9–15	102–106	Report
10 Oct	18:00	UVC Weberzeile Ried (Austria)	0–3	(Bulgaria) Marek Union Ivkoni Dupnitsa	21–25	16–25	16–25			53–75	Report
17 Nov	20:00	Vardar Skopje (North Macedonia)	0–3	(Slovenia) Calcit Volley Kamnik	12–25	15–25	17–25			44–75	Report
3 Nov	20:00	Sporting CP Lisboa (Portugal)	3–0	(Germany) Helios Grizzlys Giesen	25–20	25–22	25–23			75–65	Report
4 Nov	19:30	Lindaren Volley Luzern (Switzerland)	0–3	(Austria) Union Raiffeisen Waldviertel	18–25	21–25	19–25			58–75	Report
2 Nov	18:00	GIO Strumica (North Macedonia)	0–3	(Cyprus) Omonia Nicosia	20–25	19–25	18–25			57–75	Report
13 Nov	19:00	Fonte Bastardo Açores (Portugal)	3–2	(Turkey) Ziraat Bankası Ankara	25–23	21–25	27–25	22–25	15–9	110–107	Report

==== Second leg ====
Date	Time		Score		Set 1	Set 2	Set 3	Set 4	Set 5	Total	Report
6 Nov	17:30	Hapoel Kfar Saba (Israel)	0–3	(Turkey) Halkbank Ankara	27–29	23–25	24–26			74–80	Report
11 Nov	18:00	Nantes Rezé Métropole (France)	2–3	(France) AS Cannes	25–20	18–25	25–20	28–30	13–15	109–110	Report
11 Oct	18:00	Marek Union Ivkoni Dupnitsa (Bulgaria)	3–0	(Austria) UVC Weberzeile Ried	25–23	25–21	25–21			75–65	Report
18 Nov	20:00	Calcit Volley Kamnik (Slovenia)	3–0	(North Macedonia) Vardar Skopje	25–16	25–17	25–17			75–50	Report
10 Nov	19:00	Helios Grizzlys Giesen (Germany)	3–2	(Portugal) Sporting CP Lisboa	25–22	21–25	22–25	25–18	15–12	108–102	Report
11 Nov	19:00	Ziraat Bankası Ankara (Turkey)	3–1	(Portugal) Fonte Bastardo Açores	25–23	23–25	25–18	25–21		98–87	Report

=== 8th finals ===
Team 1	Score	Team 2
Halkbank Ankara (Turkey)	3–1	(Portugal) Sport Lisboa e Benfica
Sollentuna VK (Sweden)	0–3	(France) AS Cannes
Dinamo București (Romania)	3–0	(Bulgaria) Marek Union Ivkoni Dupnitsa
Calcit Volley Kamnik (Slovenia)	0–3	(Italy) Allianz Powervolley Milano
Epicentr-Podoliany (Ukraine)	3–2	(Estonia) Saaremaa VK
Sporting CP Lisboa (Portugal)	1–3	(Czech Republic) VK Lvi Praha
Pärnu VK (Estonia)	W.O.	(Austria) Union Raiffeisen Waldviertel
Omonia Nicosia (Cyprus)	W.O.	(Turkey) Ziraat Bankası Ankara

==== Group A ====
- Place: Ankara

Date	Time		Score		Set 1	Set 2	Set 3	Set 4	Set 5	Total	Report
15 Dec	16:00	Sollentuna VK (Sweden)	0–3	(France) AS Cannes	20–25	18–25	18–25			56–75	Report
15 Dec	19:00	Halkbank Ankara (Turkey)	3–1	(Portugal) Sport Lisboa e Benfica	21–25	25–18	25–16	25–21		96–80	Report

==== Group B ====
- Place: Milan

Date	Time		Score		Set 1	Set 2	Set 3	Set 4	Set 5	Total	Report
8 Dec	16:00	Dinamo București (Romania)	3–0	(Bulgaria) Marek Union Ivkoni Dupnitsa	25–22	25–19	25–22			75–63	Report
8 Dec	19:00	Calcit Volley Kamnik (Slovenia)	0–3	(Italy) Allianz Powervolley Milano	19–25	18–25	16–25			53–75	Report

==== Group C ====
- Place: Horodok

Date	Time		Score		Set 1	Set 2	Set 3	Set 4	Set 5	Total	Report
8 Dec	16:00	Sporting CP Lisboa (Portugal)	1–3	(Czech Republic) VK Lvi Praha	25–21	24–26	23–25	15–25		87–97	Report
8 Dec	19:00	Epicentr-Podoliany (Ukraine)	3–2	(Estonia) Saaremaa VC	25–20	20–25	25–22	23–25	15–13	108–105	Report

=== 4th finals ===
Team 1	Score	Team 2
Halkbank Ankara (Turkey)	3–1	(France) AS Cannes
Dinamo București (Romania)	0–3	(Italy) Allianz Powervolley Milano
Epicentr-Podoliany (Ukraine)	0–3	(Czech Republic) VK Lvi Praha
Pärnu VK (Estonia)	W.O.	(Turkey) Ziraat Bankası Ankara

==== Group A ====
- Place: Ankara

Date	Time		Score		Set 1	Set 2	Set 3	Set 4	Set 5	Total	Report
16 Dec	17:30	Halkbank Ankara (Turkey)	3–1	(France) AS Cannes	25–18	25–21	22–25	25–19		97–83	Report

==== Group B ====
- Place: Milan

Date	Time		Score		Set 1	Set 2	Set 3	Set 4	Set 5	Total	Report
9 Dec	18:00	Dinamo București (Romania)	0–3	(Italy) Allianz Powervolley Milano	18–25	22–25	19–25			59–75	Report

==== Group C ====
- Place: Horodok

Date	Time		Score		Set 1	Set 2	Set 3	Set 4	Set 5	Total	Report
9 Dec	18:00	Epicentr-Podoliany (Ukraine)	0–3	(Czech Republic) VK Lvi Praha	17–25	22–25	22–25			61–75	Report

== Final phase ==
=== Semifinals ===
Team 1	Agg.	Team 2	1st leg	2nd leg	Golden Set
Halkbank Ankara (Turkey)	0–6	(Italy) Allianz Powervolley Milano	1–3	0–3	
VK Lvi Praha (Czech Republic)	3–3	(Turkey) Ziraat Bankası Ankara	3–0	1–3	12–15

==== First leg ====
Date	Time		Score		Set 1	Set 2	Set 3	Set 4	Set 5	Total	Report
24 Feb	17:30	Halkbank Ankara (Turkey)	1–3	(Italy) Allianz Powervolley Milano	25–22	22–25	18–25	13–25		78–97	Report
24 Feb	17:10	VK Lvi Praha (Czech Republic)	3–0	(Turkey) Ziraat Bankası Ankara	25–22	25–14	25–23			75–59	Report

==== Second leg ====
Date	Time		Score		Set 1	Set 2	Set 3	Set 4	Set 5	Total	Report
3 Mar	19:00	Allianz Powervolley Milano (Italy)	3–0	(Turkey) Halkbank Ankara	25–20	25–22	25–20			75–62	Report
3 Mar	18:00	Ziraat Bankası Ankara (Turkey)	3–1	(Czech Republic) VK Lvi Praha	26–28	25–18	25–21	25–19		101–86	Report
Golden set		Ziraat Bankası Ankara (Turkey)	15–12	(Czech Republic) VK Lvi Praha							

=== Finals ===
Team 1	Agg.	Team 2	1st leg	2nd leg
Allianz Powervolley Milano (Italy)	4–2	(Turkey) Ziraat Bankası Ankara	3–2	3–2

==== First leg ====
Date	Time		Score		Set 1	Set 2	Set 3	Set 4	Set 5	Total	Report
17 Mar	19:00	Allianz Powervolley Milano (Italy)	3–2	(Turkey) Ziraat Bankası Ankara	22–25	25–19	18–25	25–18	15–9	105–96	Report

==== Second leg ====
Date	Time		Score		Set 1	Set 2	Set 3	Set 4	Set 5	Total	Report
24 Mar	18:00	Ziraat Bankası Ankara (Turkey)	2–3	(Italy) Allianz Powervolley Milano	23–25	25–23	25–16	18–25	8–15	99–104	Report

== Final standing ==
Rank	Team
1st place, gold medalist(s)	(Italy) Allianz Powervolley Milano
2nd place, silver medalist(s)	(Turkey) Ziraat Bankası Ankara
Semifinalists	(Turkey) Halkbank Ankara (Czech Republic) VK Lvi Praha

2021 CEV Challenge Cup winner
(Italy)
Allianz Powervolley Milano
1st title

Matteo Staforini, Luka Basic, Jan Kozamernik, Nicola Daldello, Riccardo Sbertoli, Stephen Maar, Luan Weber, Jean Patry, Matteo Meschiari, Matteo Piano,
Leandro Mosca, Yūki Ishikawa, Tine Urnaut, Nicola Pesaresi
Head coach
Roberto Piazza
