= 2024–25 CEV Champions League qualification =

Qualification for volleyball competition

This article shows the qualification phase for the 2024–25 CEV Champions League. 16 teams play in the qualification round. The two remaining teams will join the other 18 teams automatically qualified for the League round. All 14 eliminated teams will compete in the 2024–25 CEV Cup.

Olympiacos Piraeus and Hypo Tirol Innsbruck qualified for the group stage of the 2024–25 CEV Champions League.

== Participating teams ==
The drawing of lots was held on 16 July 2024 in Luxembourg City.

Rank	Country	Team(s)	Outcome (Qualified to)
11	Portugal	Sport Lisboa e Benfica	CEV Cup
12	Serbia	Crvena Zvezda Beograd	CEV Cup
13	Croatia	Mladost Zagreb	CEV Cup
15	Romania	CSM Corona Brașov	CEV Cup
16	Switzerland	Volley Schönenwerd	CEV Cup
17	Austria	Hypo Tirol Innsbruck	CEV Champions League
19	Netherlands	Orion Stars Doetinchem	CEV Cup
20	Greece	Olympiacos Piraeus	CEV Champions League
21	Montenegro	OK Budva	CEV Cup
22	Bosnia and Herzegovina	Radnik Bijeljina	CEV Cup
25	Estonia	Selver x TalTech Tallinn	CEV Cup
26	Hungary	Fino Kaposvár	CEV Cup
27	Spain	Guaguas Las Palmas	CEV Cup
28	North Macedonia	Strumica Nikob	CEV Cup
33	Cyprus	Omonia Nicosia	CEV Cup
43	Latvia	SK Jēkabpils Lūši	CEV Cup

== First round ==
- The winners of the ties qualify for the second round.
- Aggregate score is counted as follows: 3 points for 3–0 or 3–1 win, 2 points for 3–2 win, 1 point for 2–3 loss.
- In case the teams are tied after two legs, a Golden Set is played immediately at the completion of the second leg.
- All times are local.

Team 1	Agg.	Team 2	1st leg	2nd leg	Golden Set
Fino Kaposvár (Hungary)	0–6	(Austria) Hypo Tirol Innsbruck	0–3	0–3	
OK Budva (Montenegro)	1–5	(Croatia) Mladost Zagreb	1–3	2–3	
Selver x TalTech Tallinn (Estonia)	3–3	(Netherlands) Orion Stars Doetinchem	3–0	1–3	13–15
Omonia Nicosia (Cyprus)	0–6	(Serbia) Crvena Zvezda Beograd	0–3	0–3	
SK Jēkabpils Lūši (Latvia)	0–6	(Switzerland) Volley Schönenwerd	1–3	1–3	
Radnik Bijeljina (Bosnia and Herzegovina)	0–6	(Romania) CSM Corona Brașov	0–3	0–3	
Strumica Nikob (North Macedonia)	0–6	(Greece) Olympiacos Piraeus	0–3	0–3	
Guaguas Las Palmas (Spain)	3–3	(Portugal) Sport Lisboa e Benfica	3–1	1–3	15–11

=== First leg ===
Date	Time		Score		Set 1	Set 2	Set 3	Set 4	Set 5	Total	Report
18 Sep	19:00	Fino Kaposvár (Hungary)	0–3	(Austria) Hypo Tirol Innsbruck	15–25	16–25	24–26			55–76	Report
18 Sep	18:00	OK Budva (Montenegro)	1–3	(Croatia) Mladost Zagreb	25–22	24–26	20–25	20–25		89–98	Report
19 Sep	18:00	Selver x TalTech Tallinn (Estonia)	3–0	(Netherlands) Orion Stars Doetinchem	25–20	25–21	25–21			75–62	Report
19 Sep	19:00	Omonia Nicosia (Cyprus)	0–3	(Serbia) Crvena Zvezda Beograd	22–25	23–25	14–25			59–75	Report
18 Sep	19:30	SK Jēkabpils Lūši (Latvia)	1–3	(Switzerland) Volley Schönenwerd	16–25	25–23	14–25	21–25		76–98	Report
19 Sep	18:00	Radnik Bijeljina (Bosnia and Herzegovina)	0–3	(Romania) CSM Corona Brașov	20–25	22–25	15–25			57–75	Report
17 Sep	19:00	Strumica Nikob (North Macedonia)	0–3	(Greece) Olympiacos Piraeus	15–25	17–25	15–25			47–75	Report
18 Sep	19:00	Guaguas Las Palmas (Spain)	3–1	(Portugal) Sport Lisboa e Benfica	27–25	25–20	21–25	26–24		99–94	Report

=== Second leg ===
Date	Time		Score		Set 1	Set 2	Set 3	Set 4	Set 5	Total	Report
25 Sep	18:00	Hypo Tirol Innsbruck (Austria)	3–0	(Hungary) Fino Kaposvár	25–19	25–21	25–21			75–61	Report
26 Sep	19:00	Mladost Zagreb (Croatia)	3–2	(Montenegro) OK Budva	23–25	37–39	25–15	26–24	15–13	126–116	Report
25 Sep	20:00	Orion Stars Doetinchem (Netherlands)	3–1	(Estonia) Selver x TalTech Tallinn	20–25	25–20	25–17	25–19		95–81	Report
Golden set		Orion Stars Doetinchem (Netherlands)	15–13	(Estonia) Selver x TalTech Tallinn							
24 Sep	19:00	Crvena Zvezda Beograd (Serbia)	3–0	(Cyprus) Omonia Nicosia	25–22	25–18	25–19			75–59	Report
25 Sep	19:30	Volley Schönenwerd (Switzerland)	3–1	(Latvia) SK Jēkabpils Lūši	25–23	25–22	17–25	25–19		92–89	Report
25 Sep	20:00	CSM Corona Brașov (Romania)	3–0	(Bosnia and Herzegovina) Radnik Bijeljina	25–15	25–19	25–19			75–53	Report
24 Sep	19:30	Olympiacos Piraeus (Greece)	3–0	(North Macedonia) Strumica Nikob	25–19	25–17	25–21			75–57	Report
25 Sep	20:00	Sport Lisboa e Benfica (Portugal)	3–1	(Spain) Guaguas Las Palmas	25–17	21–25	26–24	31–29		103–95	Report
Golden set		Sport Lisboa e Benfica (Portugal)	11–15	(Spain) Guaguas Las Palmas							

== Second round ==
- The winners of the ties qualify for the third round.
- Aggregate score is counted as follows: 3 points for 3–0 or 3–1 win, 2 points for 3–2 win, 1 point for 2–3 loss.
- In case the teams are tied after two legs, a Golden Set is played immediately at the completion of the second leg.
- All times are local.

Team 1	Agg.	Team 2	1st leg	2nd leg
Hypo Tirol Innsbruck (Austria)	6–0	(Croatia) Mladost Zagreb	3–0	3–1
Orion Stars Doetinchem (Netherlands)	6–0	(Serbia) Crvena Zvezda Beograd	3–0	3–0
Volley Schönenwerd (Switzerland)	2–4	(Romania) CSM Corona Brașov	1–3	3–2
Olympiacos Piraeus (Greece)	4–2	(Spain) Guaguas Las Palmas	3–0	2–3

=== First leg ===
Date	Time		Score		Set 1	Set 2	Set 3	Set 4	Set 5	Total	Report
2 Oct	20:20	Hypo Tirol Innsbruck (Austria)	3–0	(Croatia) Mladost Zagreb	25–16	25–14	25–18			75–48	Report
2 Oct	20:00	Orion Stars Doetinchem (Netherlands)	3–0	(Serbia) Crvena Zvezda Beograd	26–24	25–20	25–20			76–64	Report
1 Oct	19:30	Volley Schönenwerd (Switzerland)	1–3	(Romania) CSM Corona Brașov	25–18	23–25	21–25	26–28		95–96	Report
2 Oct	19:00	Olympiacos Piraeus (Greece)	3–0	(Spain) Guaguas Las Palmas	25–21	32–30	25–23			82–74	Report

=== Second leg ===
Date	Time		Score		Set 1	Set 2	Set 3	Set 4	Set 5	Total	Report
10 Oct	17:00	Mladost Zagreb (Croatia)	1–3	(Austria) Hypo Tirol Innsbruck	23–25	25–20	18–25	17–25		83–95	Report
8 Oct	19:00	Crvena Zvezda Beograd (Serbia)	0–3	(Netherlands) Orion Stars Doetinchem	20–25	20–25	19–25			59–75	Report
8 Oct	20:00	CSM Corona Brașov (Romania)	2–3	(Switzerland) Volley Schönenwerd	21–25	23–25	25–15	38–36	11–15	118–116	Report
10 Oct	19:00	Guaguas Las Palmas (Spain)	3–2	(Greece) Olympiacos Piraeus	25–17	5–25	17–25	25–22	19–17	91–106	Report

== Third round ==
- The winners of the ties qualify for the league round.
- Aggregate score is counted as follows: 3 points for 3–0 or 3–1 win, 2 points for 3–2 win, 1 point for 2–3 loss.
- In case the teams are tied after two legs, a Golden Set is played immediately at the completion of the second leg.
- All times are local.

Team 1	Agg.	Team 2	1st leg	2nd leg
Hypo Tirol Innsbruck (Austria)	6–0	(Netherlands) Orion Stars Doetinchem	3–0	3–0
CSM Corona Brașov (Romania)	0–6	(Greece) Olympiacos Piraeus	0–3	0–3

=== First leg ===
Date	Time		Score		Set 1	Set 2	Set 3	Set 4	Set 5	Total	Report
17 Oct	18:00	Hypo Tirol Innsbruck (Austria)	3–0	(Netherlands) Orion Stars Doetinchem	25–22	25–22	25–16			75–60	Report
17 Oct	18:00	CSM Corona Brașov (Romania)	0–3	(Greece) Olympiacos Piraeus	20–25	19–25	20–25			59–75	Report

=== Second leg ===
Date	Time		Score		Set 1	Set 2	Set 3	Set 4	Set 5	Total	Report
23 Oct	20:00	Orion Stars Doetinchem (Netherlands)	0–3	(Austria) Hypo Tirol Innsbruck	20–25	21–25	24–26			65–76	Report
22 Oct	19:00	Olympiacos Piraeus (Greece)	3–0	(Romania) CSM Corona Brașov	25–23	30–28	25–23			80–74	Report
