= Power Volley Milano =

Italian volleyball club

- Full name: Power Volley Milano
- Founded: 2010
- Ground: Allianz Cloud Arena (Capacity: 5,420)
- Chairman: Roberto Piazza
- League: Italian Volleyball League
- Website: Club home page

Uniforms
Home	Away

Power Volley Milano is an Italian professional volleyball club based in Milan, Lombardy, Italy. They currently compete in the SuperLega, where they have been since the 2014–15 season. In the 2021/22 season, the club is named Allianz Milano.

== Honours ==
=== European competitions ===
- CEV Challenge Cup
  - Winners (×2): 2020-21. 2025-26

== History ==
Power Volley Milano was founded in 2010 as Power Volleyball. They competed in the 2010–11 Serie B2, and immediately gained promotion at the end of the season. However, following the sale of the club from Parabiago Volleyball, the club dissolved. They were refounded in 2012 as the current Power Volley Milano, and finished the 2012–13 Serie B1 season in 3rd place, gaining promotion to Serie A2. Following this season, the club was purchased by Wolves Volleyball Santa Croce. In the 2013–14 Serie A2 season, Power Volley finished 6th. At the end of the season, the club was sold for a third time, this time being purchased by Callipo Sport. For the 2014–15 season, Power Volley were admitted to the SuperLega for the first time. They finished their inaugural season in the top flight in 12th place, followed by an 11th place finish in the following season.

Power Volley Milano achieved its best result in the Italian Volleyball League finishing fourth in 2022/23 Season.

== Team ==
Team roster – season 2025/2026

No.	Name	Date of birth	Position
2	(Italy) Matteo Staforini	May 23, 2003 (age 22)	Libero
3	(Italy) Francesco Recine	February 7, 1999 (age 27)	Outside hitter
4	(Italy) Tommaso Ichino	June 5, 2004 (age 21)	Outside hitter
5	(Italy) Damiano Catania	March 28, 2001 (age 25)	Libero
6	(Japan) Karen Masajedi	January 28, 2007 (age 19)	Outside hitter
7	(Belgium) Ferre Reggers (C)	July 18, 2003 (age 22)	Opposite
8	(Serbia) Nemanja Mašulović	August 5, 1995 (age 30)	Middle blocker
9	(France) Leonardo Barbanti	May 9, 2006 (age 19)	Setter
10	(Finland) Veikka Lindqvist	November 13, 2003 (age 22)	Opposite
12	(Belgium) Seppe Rotty	March 12, 2001 (age 25)	Outside hitter
13	(Italy) Alessandro Benacchio	January 3, 2007 (age 19)	Middle blocker
14	(Brazil) Fernando Kreling	January 13, 1996 (age 30)	Setter
15	(Japan) Tatsunori Ōtsuka	November 5, 2000 (age 25)	Outside hitter
16	(Italy) Gabriele Di Martino	July 20, 2003 (age 22)	Middle blocker
17	(Italy) Jacopo Corbetta	February 20, 2007 (age 19)	Libero
18	(Italy) Edoardo Caneschi	January 26, 1997 (age 29)	Middle blocker
Head coach: (Italy) Roberto Piazza; Assistant: (Italy) Nicola Daldello

Team roster - season 2022/2023
Revivre Milano
No.	Name	Date of birth	Position
2	(Cuba) Osniel Mergarejo	December 18, 1997 (age 28)	outside hitter
3	(Puerto Rico) Klistan Lawrence	January 7, 2003 (age 23)	opposite
5	(Italy) Federico Bonacchi	April 8, 2004 (age 22)	setter
6	(Italy) Marco Vitelli	April 4, 1996 (age 30)	middle blocker
7	(Italy) Francesco Fusaro	May 30, 1999 (age 26)	middle blocker
8	(Argentina) Agustín Loser	October 12, 1997 (age 28)	middle blocker
9	(France) Jean Patry	December 27, 1996 (age 29)	opposite
11	(Italy) Matteo Piano (C)	October 24, 1990 (age 35)	middle blocker
14	(Japan) Yūki Ishikawa	December 11, 1995 (age 30)	outside hitter
16	(Italy) Paolo Porro	October 27, 2001 (age 24)	setter
17	(Italy) Luca Colombo	January 4, 2004 (age 22)	libero
18	(Italy) Nicola Pesaresi	February 11, 1991 (age 35)	libero
22	(Iran) Milad Ebadipour	October 17, 1993 (age 32)	outside hitter
15	(Japan) Tatsunori Otsuka	November 5, 2000 (age 25)	outside hitter
Head coach: (Italy) Roberto Piazza; Assistant: (Italy) Nicola Daldello

Team roster - season 2017/2018
Revivre Milano
No.	Name	Date of birth	Position
1	(Netherlands) Nimir Abdel-Aziz	February 5, 1992 (age 34)	opposite
2	(Italy) Alessandro Piccinelli	January 30, 1997 (age 29)	libero
3	(Belgium) Kevin Klinkenberg	October 4, 1990 (age 35)	opposite
5	(Italy) Nicola Daldello	May 6, 1983 (age 42)	setter
6	(Italy) Riccardo Sbertoli	May 23, 1998 (age 27)	setter
7	(Italy) Allesandro Tondo	August 18, 1991 (age 34)	middle blocker
8	(Germany) Ruben Schott	July 8, 1994 (age 31)	outside hitter
11	(Italy) Matteo Piano	October 24, 1990 (age 35)	middle blocker
12	(Italy) Gianluca Galassi	July 24, 1997 (age 28)	middle blocker
13	(United States) Taylor Averill	March 5, 1992 (age 34)	middle blocker
15	(Italy) Fabio Fanuli	February 10, 1985 (age 41)	libero
16	(Italy) Alessandro Preti	August 7, 1992 (age 33)	outside hitter
18	(Slovenia) Klemen Čebulj	February 21, 1992 (age 34)	outside hitter
Head coach: Andrea Giani; Assistant: Matteo De Cecco

Team roster - season 2016/2017
Revivre Milano
No.	Name	Date of birth	Position
3	(Italy) Danilo Cortina	June 8, 1987 (age 38)	libero
4	(Canada) Nicholas Hoag	May 19, 1992 (age 33)	outside Hitter
5	(Italy) Andrea Galaverna	May 30, 1994 (age 31)	universal
6	(Italy) Riccardo Sbertoli	May 23, 1998 (age 27)	setter
7	(Italy) Allesandro Tondo	August 18, 1991 (age 34)	middle blocker
8	(Bulgaria) Todor Skrimov	January 9, 1990 (age 36)	outside hitter
9	(Denmark) Rasmus Nielsen	May 22, 1994 (age 31)	outside hitter
10	(Italy) Gabriel Rudi	August 14, 1994 (age 31)	libero
11	(Italy) Giorgio De Togni	July 7, 1985 (age 40)	middle blocker
12	(Italy) Gianluca Galassi	July 24, 1997 (age 28)	middle blocker
13	(Cuba) Ángel Dennis^{1}	June 13, 1977 (age 48)	outside hitter
14	(Italy) Dante Boninfante	March 7, 1977 (age 49)	setter
15	(Serbia) Saša Starović^{2}	October 19, 1988 (age 37)	universal
16	(Poland) Paweł Adamajtis^{3}	August 30, 1990 (age 35)	outside hitter
18	(Italy) Federico Marretta	August 9, 1990 (age 35)	universal
Head coach: Luca Monti; Assistant: Massimiliano De Marco^{1} Angel Dennis played in Revivre Milano from October 15, 2016 to December 5, 2016.^{2} Sasha Starvoć left the club on January 27, 2017.^{3} Paweł Adamajtis joined the club on January 30, 2017.

== COVID-19 pandemic ==
The club is related to COVID-19 pandemic in Estonia. They participated in the 2019–20 CEV Challenge Cup matches held in Saaremaa island on 4 and 5 March. On 9 March 5 Milan players had been diagnosed with fever before a league match. On March 11 there was a report on the two first cases on the island. The infected in Saaremaa included the CEO of the Saaremaa VK volleyball club. By March 14 there were 31 COVID-19 cases in Saaremaa and all Western Estonian islands were closed down to all but residents, but the cases had already spread to the mainland. Saare County was also the hardest hit county in Estonia by the COVID-19 in the beginning of the pandemic – it only has 2.5% of the population of Estonia, but had over half of all hospitalized patients.

== Title Sponsor ==
Year(s)	Companies
2019–present	Capcom
