= OK Borac =

Volleyball club in Bosnia and Herzegovina

- Short name: OK Borac m:tel
- Founded: July 13, 2001
- Ground: Sport hall Borik (Capacity: 4000)
- Chairman: Srđan Marjanović
- Manager: Mišo Marjanović
- League: Premier League
- Website: Club home page

Uniforms
Home	Away

Volleyball Club Borac (Serbian Cyrillic: Одбојкашки клуб Борац m:tel) is men's volleyball club based in Banja Luka, Republika Srpska, Bosnia and Herzegovina . Club is currently competing in the Premier League.

== Recent seasons ==
The recent season-by-season performance of the club:

Season	Division	Tier	Position
2014–15	Premier League	I	4th
2015–16	Premier League	I	8th
2016–17	Premier League	I	8th
2017–18	Premier League	I	6th
2018-19	Premier League	I	4th
2019–20	Premier League	I	6th
2020–21	Premier League	I	7th
2021–22	Premier League	I	3rd
