= 2009–10 CEV Challenge Cup =

- League: CEV Challenge Cup
- Sport: Volleyball
- Duration: 16 October 2010 – 13 March 2011

Finals
- Champions: (Italy) RPA-LuigiBacchi.it Perugia
- Runners-up: (Croatia) Mladost Zagreb

CEV Challenge Cup seasons
- ← 2008–09 2010–11 →

The 2009–10 CEV Challenge Cup was the 30th edition of the European Challenge Cup volleyball club tournament, the former CEV Cup.

The Italian club RPA-LuigiBacchi.it Perugia beat the Croatian club Mladost Zagreb in the final and achieved its unique CEV Challenge Cup trophy.

== Final Four ==
- Venue: (Italy) PalaBarton, Perugia

Semifinals
27 March
(Czech Republic) Dukla Liberec	0
(Croatia) Mladost Zagreb	3
27 March
(Germany) SCC Berlin	0
(Italy) RPA-LuigiBacchi.it Perugia	3

Final
28 March
(Croatia) Mladost Zagreb	0
(Italy) RPA-LuigiBacchi.it Perugia	3
3rd place match
28 March
(Czech Republic) Dukla Liberec	1
(Germany) SCC Berlin	3

=== Semi finals ===
Date	Time		Score		Set 1	Set 2	Set 3	Set 4	Set 5	Total	Report
27 Mar	19:30	Dukla Liberec (Czech Republic)	0–3	(Croatia) Mladost Zagreb	18–25	21–25	20–25			59–75	Report
27 Mar	16:30	SCC Berlin (Germany)	0–3	(Italy) RPA-LuigiBacchi.it Perugia	14–25	21–25	24–26			59–76	Report

=== 3rd place ===
Date	Time		Score		Set 1	Set 2	Set 3	Set 4	Set 5	Total	Report
28 Mar	13:00	Dukla Liberec (Czech Republic)	1–3	(Germany) SCC Berlin	25–22	19–25	23–25	22–25		89–97	Report

=== Final ===
Date	Time		Score		Set 1	Set 2	Set 3	Set 4	Set 5	Total	Report
28 Mar	16:00	Mladost Zagreb (Croatia)	0–3	(Italy) RPA-LuigiBacchi.it Perugia	12–25	13–25	20–25			45–75	Report

== Final standing ==
Rank	Team
1st place, gold medalist(s)	(Italy) RPA-LuigiBacchi.it Perugia
2nd place, silver medalist(s)	(Croatia) Mladost Zagreb
3rd place, bronze medalist(s)	(Germany) SCC Berlin
4	(Czech Republic) Dukla Liberec

== Awards ==
- Most valuable player

(Italy) Damiano Pippi (RPA-LuigiBacchi.it Perugia)

- Best scorer

(Cuba) Salvador Hidalgo Oliva (SCC Berlin)

- Best Opposite

(Croatia) Ivan Mihalj (Mladost Zagreb)

- Best blocker

(Germany) Stefan Hübner (RPA-LuigiBacchi.it Perugia)

- Best server

(Italy) Cristian Savani (RPA-LuigiBacchi.it Perugia)

- Best receiver

(Italy) Matej Černič (RPA-LuigiBacchi.it Perugia)

- Best libero

(Czech Republic) Martin Kryštof (SCC Berlin)

- Best setter

(Italy) Giacomo Sintini (RPA-LuigiBacchi.it Perugia)
