= 2010–11 CEV Challenge Cup =

- League: CEV Challenge Cup
- Sport: Volleyball
- Duration: 16 October 2010 – 13 March 2011

Finals
- Champions: (Italy) Lube Banca Marche Macerata
- Runners-up: (Turkey) Arkas Izmir

CEV Challenge Cup seasons
- ← 2009–10 2011–12 →

The 2010–11 CEV Challenge Cup was the 31st edition of the European Challenge Cup volleyball club tournament, the former CEV Cup.

The Italian club Lube Banca Marche Macerata beat the Turkish club Arkas Izmir in the final and achieved its fourth CEV Challenge Cup trophy.

== Final phase ==
=== Semi-finals ===
Team 1	Agg.	Team 2	1st leg	2nd leg	Golden Set
EAP Lux (Greece)	0–2	(Italy) Lube Banca Marche Macerata	1–3	0–3	
Posojilnica Aich/Dob (Austria)	1–1	(Turkey) Arkas Izmir	3–2	0–3	6–15

==== First leg ====
Date	Time		Score		Set 1	Set 2	Set 3	Set 4	Set 5	Total	Report
23 Feb	19:00	EAP Lux (Greece)	1–3	(Italy) Lube Banca Marche Macerata	27–25	18–25	15–25	15–25		75–100	Report
22 Feb	19:00	Posojilnica Aich/Dob (Austria)	3–2	(Turkey) Arkas Izmir	19–25	23–25	25–21	25–23	15–13	107–107	Report

==== Second leg ====
Date	Time		Score		Set 1	Set 2	Set 3	Set 4	Set 5	Total	Report
27 Mar	18:00	Lube Banca Marche Macerata (Italy)	3–0	(Greece) EAP Lux	25–16	25–16	25–23			75–55	Report
26 Mar	19:30	Arkas Izmir (Turkey)	3–0	(Austria) Posojilnica Aich/Dob	25–18	21–15	25–23			71–56	Report
Golden set		Arkas Izmir (Turkey)	15–6	(Austria) Posojilnica Aich/Dob							

=== Final ===
Team 1	Agg.	Team 2	1st leg	2nd leg
Lube Banca Marche Macerata (Italy)	2–0	(Turkey) Arkas Izmir	3–0	3–2

==== First leg ====
Date	Time		Score		Set 1	Set 2	Set 3	Set 4	Set 5	Total	Report
9 Mar	20:30	Lube Banca Marche Macerata (Italy)	3–0	(Turkey) Arkas Izmir	25–18	41–39	25–23			91–80	Report

==== Second leg ====
Date	Time		Score		Set 1	Set 2	Set 3	Set 4	Set 5	Total	Report
13 Mar	17:00	Arkas Izmir (Turkey)	2–3	(Italy) Lube Banca Marche Macerata	22–25	25–20	33–31	19–25	13–15	112–116	Report

== Final standing ==
Rank	Team
1st place, gold medalist(s)	(Italy) Lube Banca Marche Macerata
2nd place, silver medalist(s)	(Turkey) Arkas Izmir
Semifinalists	(Austria) Posojilnica Aich/Dob
Semifinalists	(Greece) EAP Lux
