= CSA Steaua București (volleyball) =

Romanian volleyball club

- Full name: Clubul Sportiv al Armatei Steaua București
- Short name: Steaua
- Nickname: Roș-Albaștrii (The Red and Blues)
- Ground: Sala Polivalentă (Capacity: 5,300)
- Manager: Marcelo Fronckowiak
- League: Divizia A1
- 2022–23: Divizia A1, 2nd

CSA Steaua București, is a volleyball club based in Bucharest, Romania, that competes in the CEV Challenge Cup.

== Honours ==
- Divizia A1

Winners (16): 1951, 1952, 1954, 1957, 1967, 1968, 1969, 1970, 1971, 1978, 1986, 1987, 1988, 1989, 1990, 1991

- CEV Champions League

Runners Up (2): 1969, 1979

- CEV Cup

Runners Up (3): 1977, 1981, 1986

== Team ==
=== Current squad ===
Squad for the 2018-19 season

- (Romania) Ovidiu Darlaczi
- (Romania) Nicolas Grigorie
- (Romania) Gheorghe Ilie
- (Romania) Andrei Ana
- (Romania) Cornel Miron
- (Romania) George Gavriz
- (Netherlands) Michaël Parkinson
- (Estonia) Karli Allik
- (Brazil) Ialisson César Mello de Amorin
- (Brazil) Caio de Prá
- (Poland) Daniel Szaniawski
- (Austria) Maximilian Thaller
- (Hungary) Dávid Csanád

== See also ==
- Romania men's national volleyball team
