= Calcit Volley =

Slovenian volleyball club

- Full name: Odbojkarski klub Kamnik
- Founded: 1947; 79 years ago
- Ground: Kamnik Sports Hall
- Chairman: Gregor Hribar
- Manager: Gregor Rozman
- Captain: Uroš Pavlović
- League: Slovenian Volleyball League
- 2025–26: Regular season: 2nd Playoffs: Runners-up
- Website: Club home page
- Championships: 2001, 2002, 2003

Uniforms
Home	Away

Odbojkarski klub Kamnik (English: Kamnik Volleyball Club), known as Calcit Volley due to sponsorship reasons, is a Slovenian volleyball team from Kamnik. The club was founded in 1947 and competes in the Slovenian League and in MEVZA League. Calcit Volley won the Slovenian League three times consecutively between 2000–01 and 2002–03.

== Honours ==
- Slovenian Volleyball League
  - Winners (3): 2000–01, 2001–02, 2002–03
- Slovenian Volleyball Cup
  - Winners (5): 2000–01, 2015–16, 2016–17, 2020–21, 2023–24
- MEVZA League
  - Winners (1): 2023–24
