= Maccabi Tel Aviv =

Multi-sport club in Israel

- Full name: Maccabi Tel Aviv Sport Club מכבי תל אביב
- Nickname: Maccabi; The Yellows
- Founded: 1906
- Colors
- Website: Club home page

Maccabi Tel Aviv Sport Club (Hebrew: מכבי תל אביב) is one of the largest sports clubs in Israel, and a part of the Maccabi World Union. Many sports clubs and teams in Tel Aviv are in association with Maccabi and compete in a variety of sports, such as football, basketball, judo, swimming, handball, and others.

== Clubs ==
=== Maccabi Tel Aviv Football Club ===
Maccabi Tel Aviv F.C. is the most titled club in Israeli football, and the most successful Israeli football club outside the country, having won the AFC Champions League twice. Its derby with city rivals Hapoel Tel Aviv is considered one of the most heated derbies in Israeli sports. Maccabi was the second Israeli club to reach the coveted group stage of the UEFA Champions League, and the only team in Israel that was never relegated from the top division in the Israeli league.

=== Maccabi Tel Aviv Basketball Club ===
Maccabi Tel Aviv B.C. is one of the most successful basketball clubs in Europe, having won the EuroLeague competition six times, and been runner-up a further nine times.

=== Maccabi Tel Aviv Handball Club ===
The handball team of Maccabi Tel Aviv was founded in the 1930s, with the arrival of handball to Israel and was split initially to three different associations: Maccabi Tel Aviv North (which was one of Israel's most prominent handball team and won 3 Cups in a row, 1963–1965), Maccabi Tel Aviv and Brit Maccabim Atid. These associations united over the years under the name of Maccabi Tel Aviv. In the 2013–14 season Maccabi Tel Aviv won its first championship.

=== Maccabi Tel Aviv/Maccabiah Swim Club ===
Established in 1989.

=== Maccabi Tel Aviv Volleyball Club ===
Maccabi Tel Aviv is a professional volleyball club which plays at the highest levels of Israeli volleyball. During the 2009–10 season, the team made Israeli volleyball history by going undefeated, winning both the Cup and the League Championship. The team is coached by Arie Selinger, who is widely regarded as one of the greatest volleyball coaches of all time.

== Notable members ==
- Blessing Afrifah (born 2003), Olympic sprinter
- Artem Dolgopyat (born 1997), Olympic champion artistic gymnast
- Dmitry Kroyter (born 1993), Olympic high jumper
- Mikaella Moshe (born 2003), Olympic archer
- Shachar Sagiv (born 1994), Olympic triathlete
- Lonah Chemtai Salpeter (born 1988), Kenya-born Israeli Olympic marathon runner

== See also ==
- History of Tel Aviv
- Sports in Israel
- Culture of Israel
