= List of people from Saratov =

Coat of Arms of Saratov

This is a list of notable people who were born or have lived in Saratov, Russia.

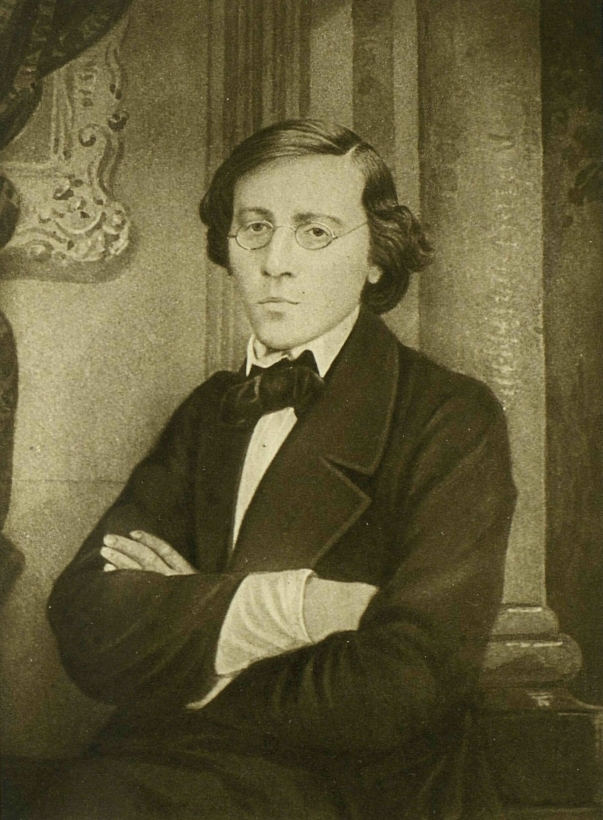
Nikolay Chernyshevsky (1828–1889)

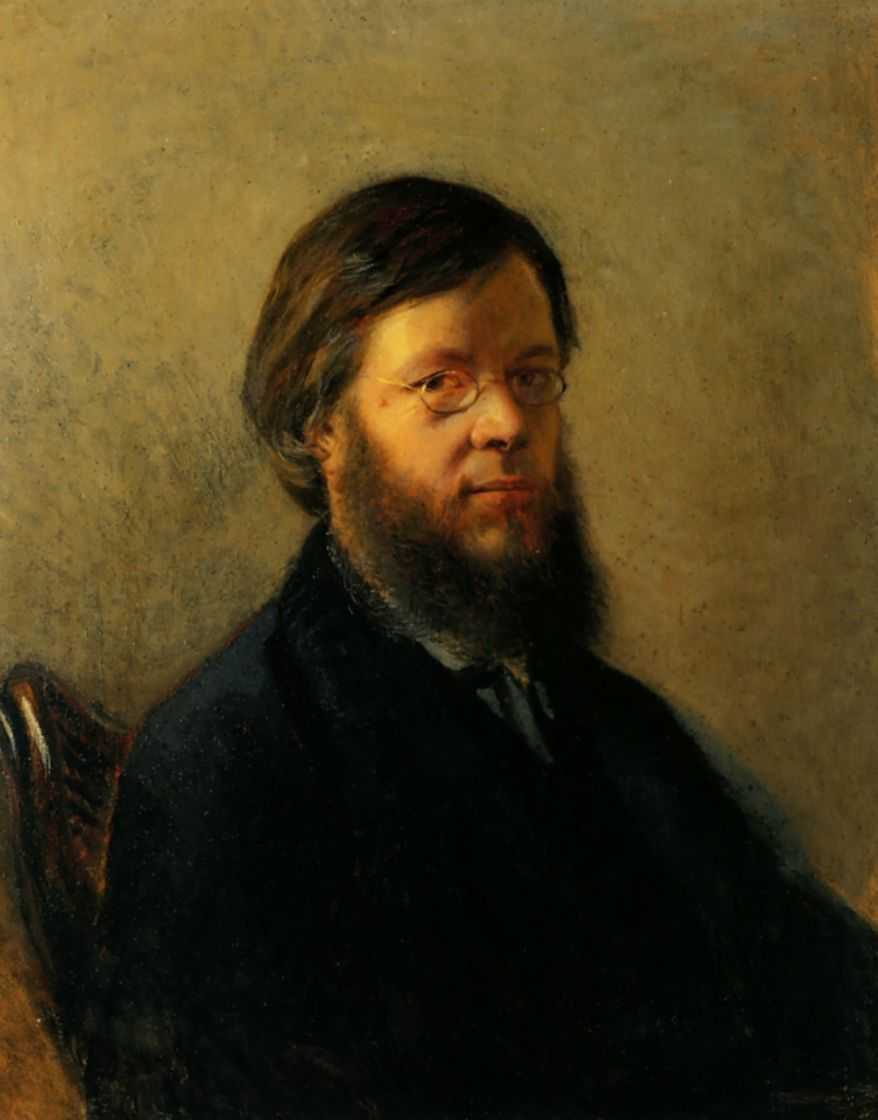
Alexander Pypin (1833–1904)

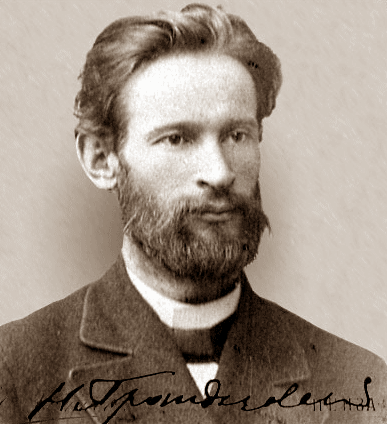
Nikolai Grandkovsky (1864–1907)

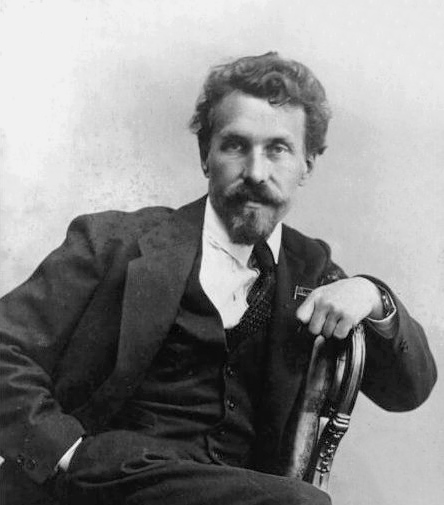
Alexei Rykov (1881–1938)

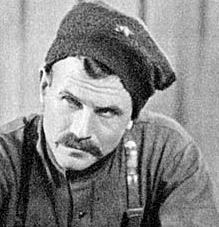
Boris Babochkin (1904–1975)

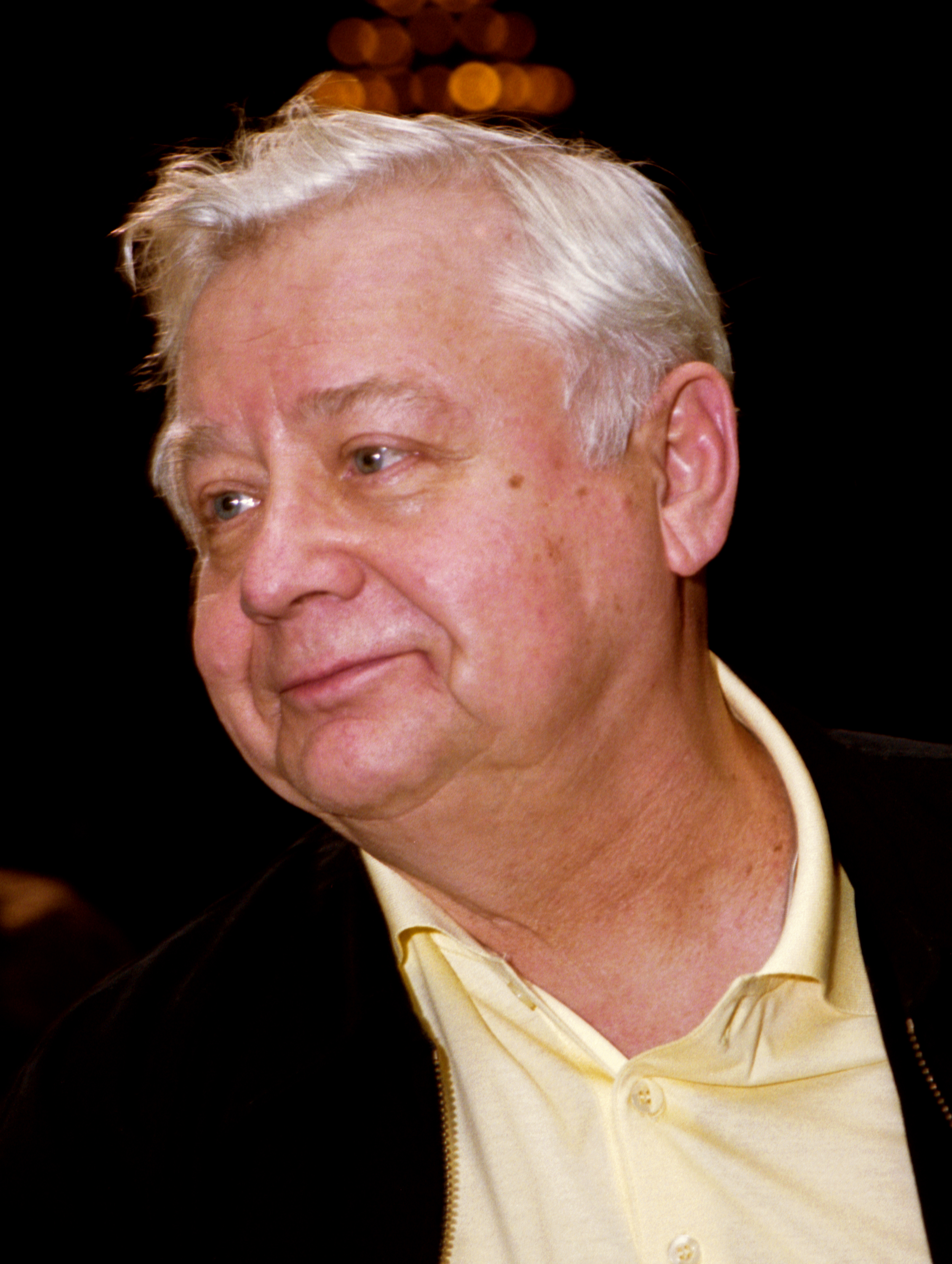
Oleg Tabakov (1935–2018)

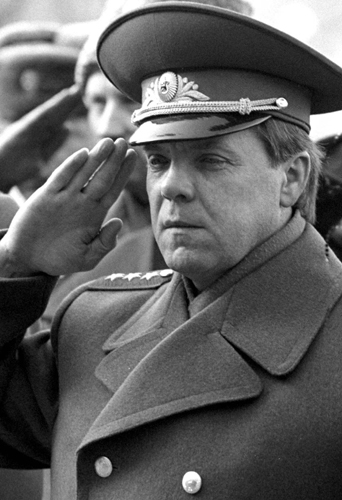
Boris Gromov (born 1943)

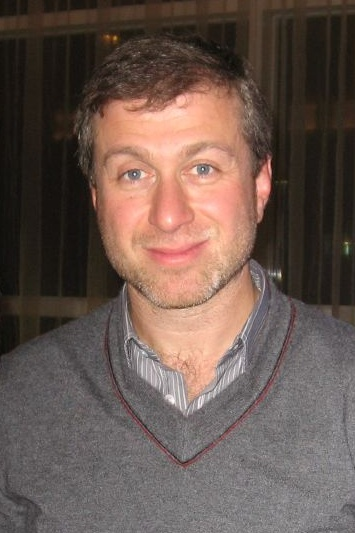
Roman Abramovich (born 1966)

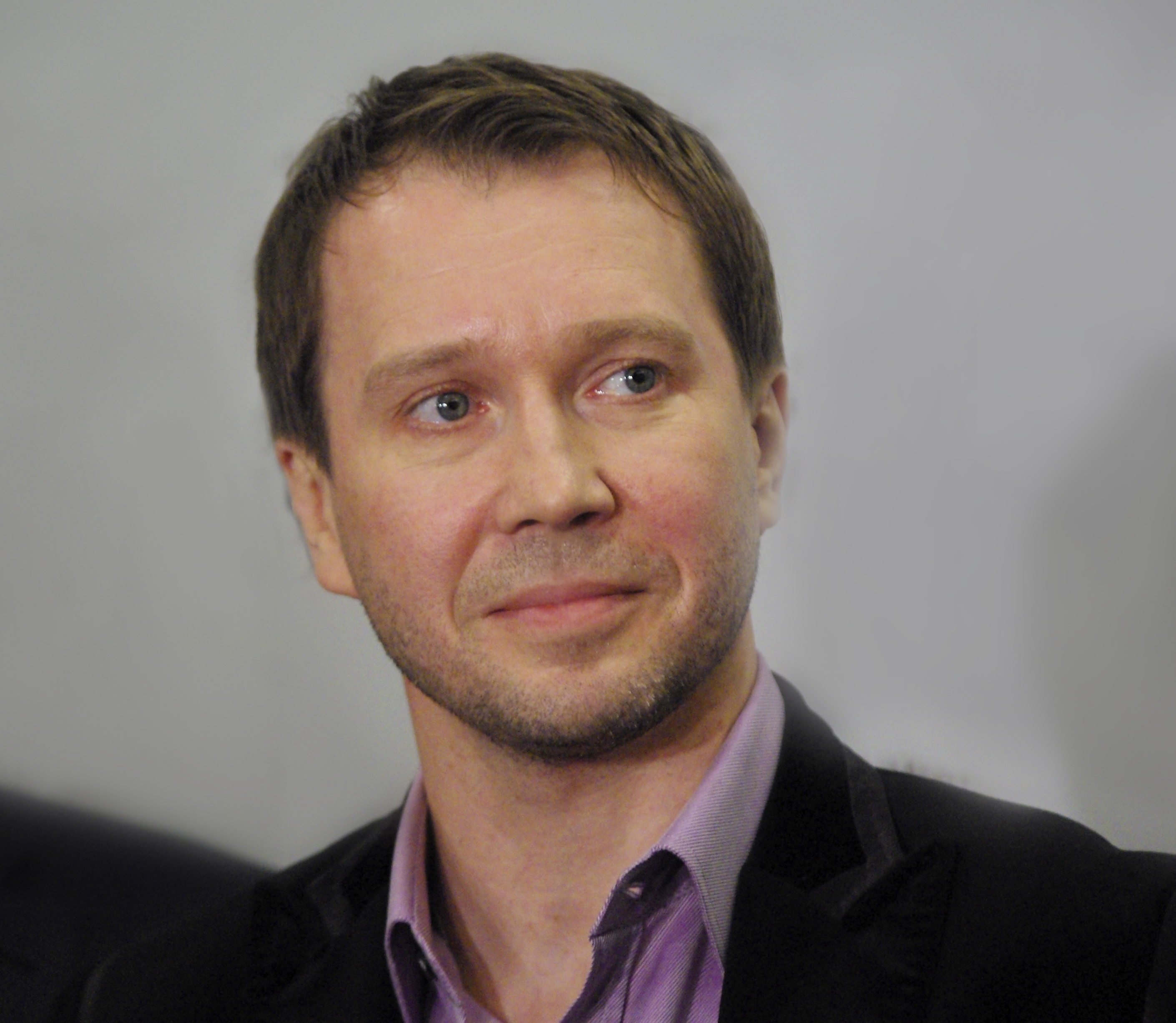
Yevgeny Mironov (born 1966)

Alexey Ashapatov (born 1973)

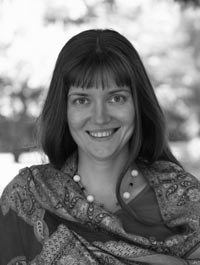
Ksenya Stepanycheva (born 1978)

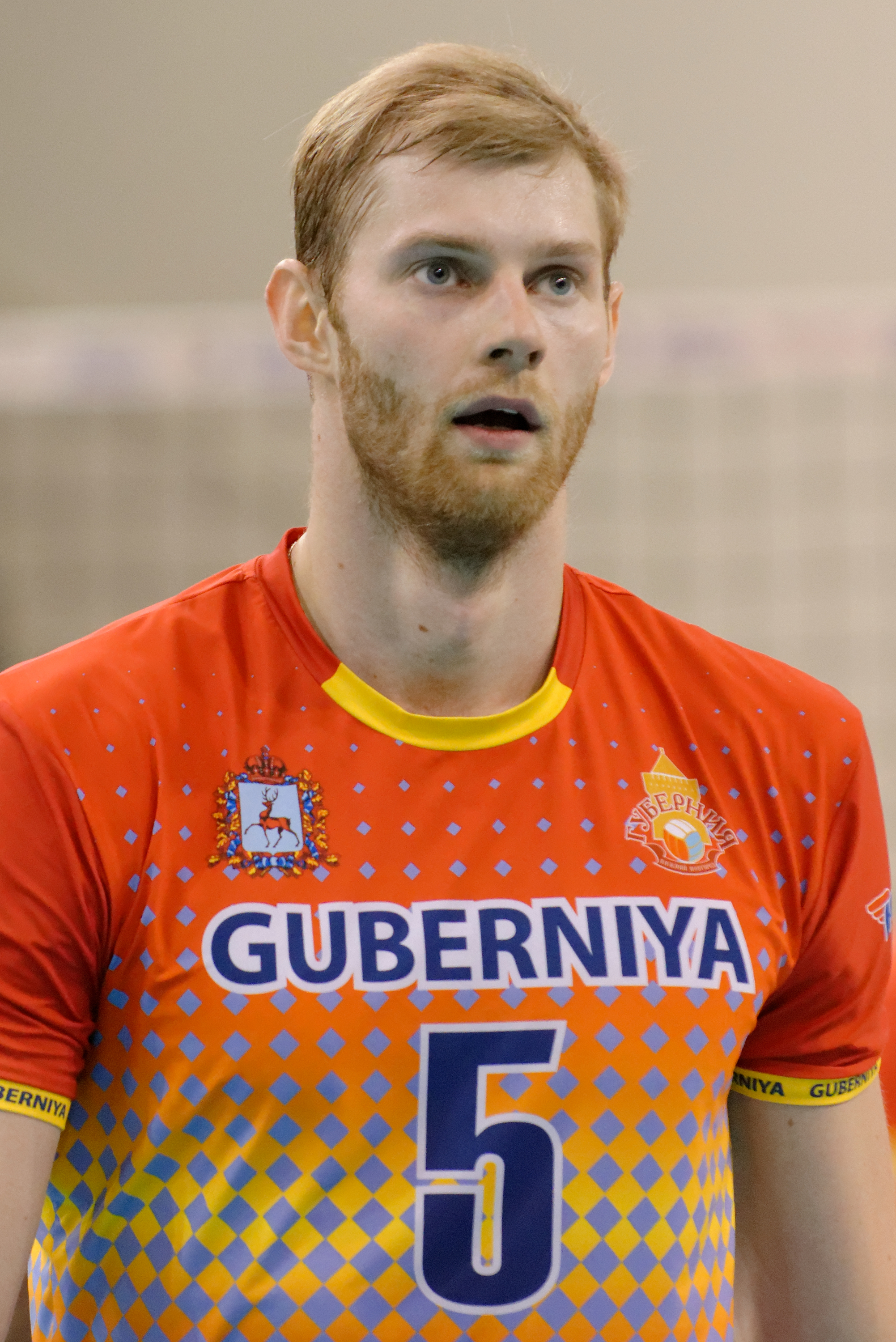
Aleksey Ostapenko (born 1986)

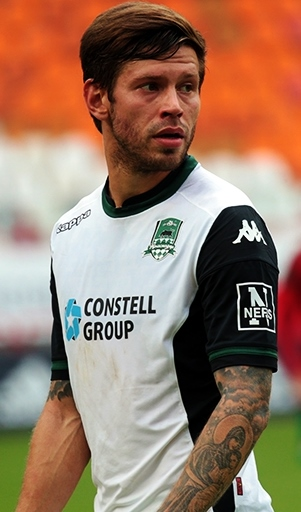
Fyodor Smolov (born 1990)

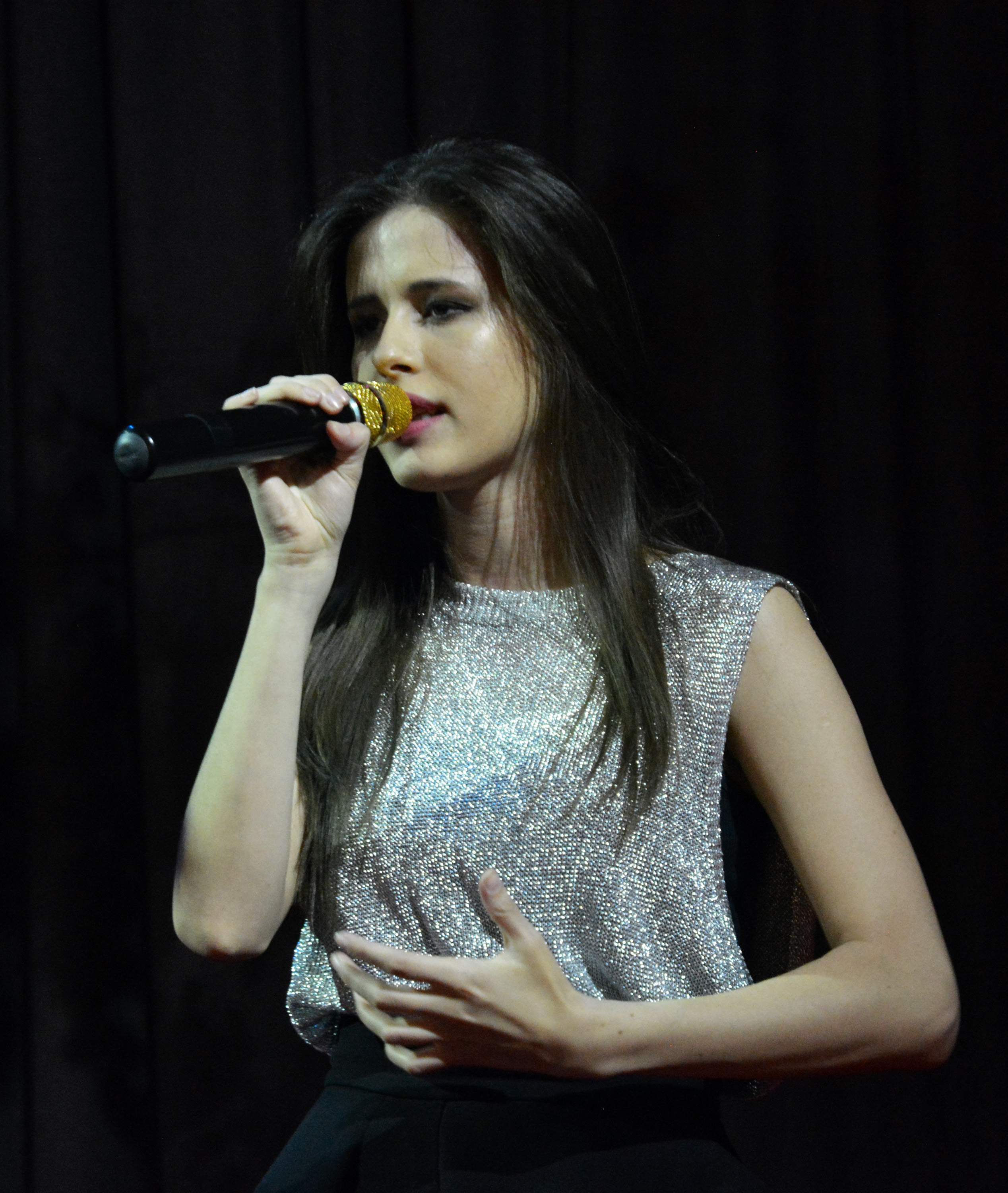
Elvira T (born 1994)

== Born in Saratov ==
=== 19th century ===
==== 1801–1850 ====
- Stepan Shevyryov (1806–1864), conservative Russian literary historian and poet
- Konstantin von Kügelgen (1810–1880), German painter
- Nikolay Chernyshevsky (1828–1889), Russian revolutionary democrat, materialist philosopher, critic and socialist
- Alexander Pypin (1833–1904), Russian literary historian, ethnographer, journalist and editor
- Firs Zhuravlev (1836–1901), Russian genre painter

==== 1851–1900 ====
- Nikolai Grandkovsky (1864–1907), Russian Realist painter who specialized in portraits and genre scenes
- Bina Abramowitz (1865 - 1953), Yiddish-language actress
- Victor Borisov-Musatov (1870–1905), Russian painter
- Pavel Kuznetsov (1878–1968), Russian painter and graphic artist
- Aleksandr Matveyev (1878–1960), Russian sculptor
- Alexei Rykov (1881–1938), Russian Bolshevik revolutionary and Soviet politician; Premier of Russia and the Soviet Union
- Alexander Savinov (1881–1942), Russian and Soviet painter and art educator
- Anna Andreevna Kalmanovich (fl. 1893–1917), Russian feminist and activist
- Georgy Fedotov (1886–1951), Russian religious philosopher, historian, essayist, author of many books on Orthodox culture, regarded by some as a founder of Russian "theological culturology"
- Georgy Oppokov (1888–1938), Russian Bolshevik
- Rachel Bluwstein (1890–1931), Hebrew-language poet
- Isaak Zelensky (1890–1938), Russian politician; Secretary General of the Uzbek Soviet Socialist Republic
- Konstantin Fedin (1892–1977), Russian novelist and literary functionary
- Nikolay Semyonov (1896–1986), Russian Soviet physicist and chemist; awarded the 1956 Nobel Prize in Chemistry for his work on the mechanism of chemical transformation
- Stepan Kayukov (1898–1960), Soviet actor
- Viktor Bolkhovitinov (1899–1970), Soviet engineer, team-leader of the developers of the Bereznyak-Isayev BI-1 aircraft
- Nadezhda Mandelstam (1899–1980), Russian writer and educator

=== 20th century ===
==== 1901–1930 ====
- Alexander Bek (1903–1972), Soviet novelist and writer
- Jerzy Pichelski (1903–1963), Polish film and theatre actor
- Boris Babochkin (1904–1975), Soviet film and theatre actor and director
- Viktor Wagner (1908–1981), Russian mathematician
- Vladimir Ovchinnikov (1911–1978), Soviet and Russian painter
- Sweeney Schriner (1911–1990), Russian-born Canadian professional ice hockey forward
- Sergey Filippov (1912–1990), Soviet film and theatre actor
- Nikolai Minkh (1912–1982), Soviet composer, conductor and pianist
- Boris Andreyev (1915–1982), Soviet actor
- Michel Garder (1916–1993), French author and military man
- Alexander Obukhov (1918–1989), Russian physicist and applied mathematician
- Raisa Aronova (1920–1982), Russian Po-2 pilot in World War II
- Vladimir Vengerov (1920–1997), Soviet film director
- Jan Białostocki (1921–1988), Polish art historian
- Boris Balashov (1927–1974), Editor-in-Chief of the Soviet magazine "Filateliya SSSR" ("Philately of the USSR")
- Nikolai Krogius (1930–2022), Russian Chess Grandmaster, International Arbiter, psychologist, chess coach, chess administrator and author

==== 1931–1950 ====
- Joseph G. Hakobyan (born 1931), Russian scientist
- Mikhail Shakhov (1931–2018), Soviet wrestler
- Lev Pitaevskii (1933–2022), Soviet theoretical physicist
- Oleg Tabakov (1935–2018), Soviet and Russian actor and the artistic director of the Moscow Art Theatre
- Irma Raush (born 1938), Russian actress
- Yury Sharov (1939–2021), Soviet fencer
- Yuri Simonov (born 1941), Russian conductor
- Boris Gromov (born 1943), prominent Russian military and political figure; Governor of Moscow Oblast from 2000 to 2012
- Evgeny Rukhin (1943–1976), Russian Non-Conformist painter
- Lydia Mordkovitch (1944–2014), Russian violinist
- Alexander Zemlianichenko (born 1950), Russian photojournalist

==== 1951–1970 ====
- Vladimir Konkin (born 1951), Soviet and Russian cinema and theatre actor
- Sergei Shuvalov (1951–2021), Soviet and Russian politician
- Alexander Koreshkov (born 1952), Russian professional football coach and player
- Alexander Sukhanov (born 1952), Soviet and Russian poet, composer, bard and mathematician
- Lyubov Sliska (born 1953), Russian politician
- Marina Shimanskaya (born 1955), Russian actress
- Sergei Konyagin (born 1957), Russian mathematician
- Andrei Shevtsov (born 1961), Russian professional footballer
- Yuri Klyuchnikov (born 1963), Russian professional football referee and player
- Julia Gomelskaya (born 1964), Ukrainian composer of contemporary classical music
- Vladimir Lazarev (born 1964), Russian and French chess Grandmaster
- Roman Abramovich (born 1966), Russian businessman, investor and politician
- Anatoli Fedotov (born 1966), Russian professional ice hockey player
- Yevgeny Mironov (born 1966), Russian film and stage actor
- Dmitry Chernyshenko (born 1968), Russian businessman and the President of the Sochi 2014 Olympic Organizing Committee for the 2014 Winter Olympics
- Filipp Yankovsky (born 1968), Russian actor and film director
- Igor Meglinski (born 1968), British scientist

==== 1971–1980 ====
- Kseniya Kachalina (born 1971), Russian actress
- Inessa Korkmaz (born 1972), Russian female volleyball player
- Sergei Nikolayev (born 1972), Russian professional ice hockey goaltender
- Yulia Timofeeva (born 1972), Russian former track and field sprinter and bobsledder
- Alexey Ashapatov (born 1973), Russian paralympian athlete competing mainly in category F57-58 throwing events
- Yuliya Levina (born 1973), Russian rower
- Alexei Yegorov (born 1976), Russian professional ice hockey goaltender
- Zanna Proniadu (born 1978), Greek female volleyball player
- Ksenya Stepanycheva (born 1978), Russian playwright
- Vadim Garin (born 1979), Russian professional football player

==== 1981–1990 ====
- Aleksei Ivanov (born 1981), Russian professional football player
- Denis Platonov (born 1981), Russian professional ice hockey centre
- Maxim Velikov (born 1982), Russian professional ice hockey defenceman
- Sergei Monia (born 1983), Russian professional basketball player
- Anton Grebnev (born 1984), Russian professional football player
- Maxim Krivonozhkin (born 1984), Russian professional ice hockey forward
- Nikolai Bondarenko (born 1985), Russian politician and blogger
- Andrei Murnin (born 1985), Russian professional football player
- Jurgita Dronina (born 1986), Russian-Lithuanian ballet dancer
- Katia Elizarova (born 1986), Russian model and actress
- Aleksey Ostapenko (born 1986), Russian volleyball player
- Vladimir Romanenko (born 1987), Russian professional football player
- Stanislav Romanov (born 1987), Russian professional ice hockey defenceman
- Evgeny Tomashevsky (born 1987), Russian chess Grandmaster and former World number 15
- Kombinaciya (founded 1988), Russian female pop band
- Zedd (born 1989), Russian-German Grammy Award-winning musician, music producer and DJ
- Artyom Molodtsov (born 1990), Russian professional football player
- Fyodor Smolov (born 1990), Russian professional football player

==== 1991–2000 ====
- Alexandr Loginov (born 1992), Russian biathlete
- Valeria Solovyeva (born 1992), Russian tennis player
- Elvira T (born 1994), Russian singer and songwriter
- Artyom Timofeyev (born 1994), Russian professional football player

== Lived in Saratov ==
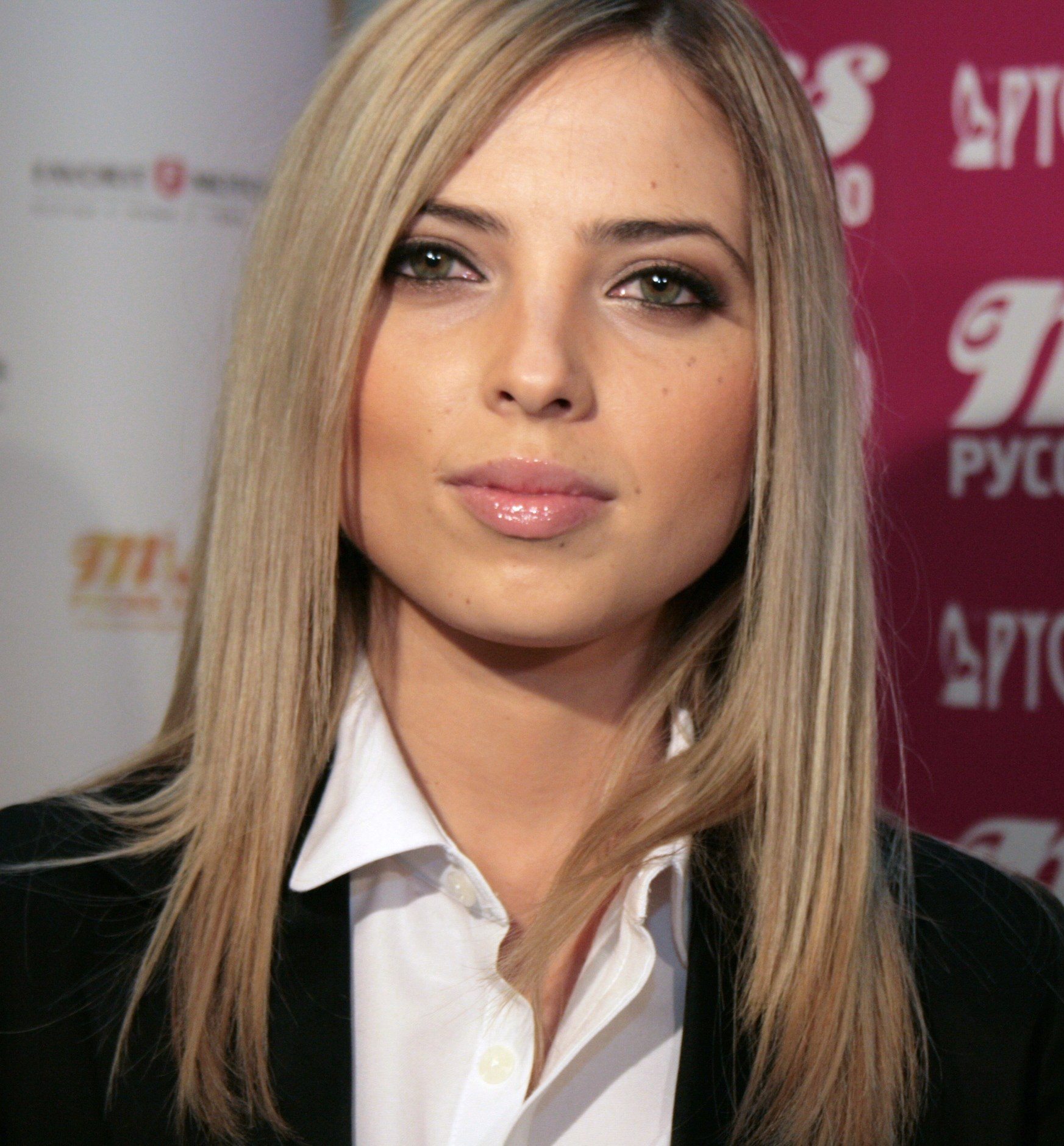
Anastasia Karpova (born 1984)

- Gavrila Derzhavin (1743–1816), one of the most highly esteemed Russian poets before Alexander Pushkin
- Alexander Radishchev (1749–1802), Russian author and social critic
- Jean-Victor Poncelet (1788–1867), French engineer and mathematician (prisoner of war)
- Nikolay Zinin (1812–1880), Russian organic chemist
- Alexey Bogolyubov (1824–1896), Russian landscape painter
- Lev Igorev (1821–1893), Russian portrait painter in the Academic style
- Ilya Salov (1834–1902), Russian writer, playwright and translator
- Mikhail Vrubel (1856–1910), Russian painter
- Fyodor Schechtel (1859–1926), Russian architect, graphic artist and stage designer, the most influential and prolific master of Russian Art Nouveau and late Russian Revival
- Pyotr Stolypin (1862–1911), 3rd Chairman of Council of Ministers of the Russian Empire, served as Prime Minister and Minister of Internal Affairs from 1906 to 1911
- Leonid Sobinov (1872–1934), Imperial Russian operatic tenor
- Kuzma Petrov-Vodkin (1878–1939), Russian and Soviet painter and writer
- Herwarth Walden (1879–1941), German Expressionist artist, critic, and courageous promoter of early 20th century avant-garde art. Killed in Saratov in a Soviet camp during Stalin's "Purges."
- Nikolai Vavilov (1887–1943), Russian and Soviet botanist and geneticist, died in a Saratov jail
- Mikhail Bulgakov (1891–1940), Russian writer and playwright
- Konstantin Paustovsky (1892–1968), Russian Soviet writer nominated for the Nobel Prize for literature in 1965
- Lidia Ruslanova (1900–1973), Russian folk singer
- Lev Kassil (1905–1970), Soviet writer of juvenile and young adult literature, depicting Soviet life, teenagers and their world, school, sports, cultural life and war
- Oleg Antonov (1906–1984), Soviet aircraft designer
- Alfred Schnittke (1934–1998), Soviet and Russian composer
- Boris M. Schein (1938–2023), Russian-American mathematician
- Eduard Limonov (1943–2020), Russian writer, poet, publicist and political dissident
- Oleg Yankovsky (1944–2009), Soviet Russian actor
- Valeriya (born 1968), Russian pop singer
- Anastasia Karpova (born 1984), Russian pop singer
- Natalia Pogonina (born 1985), Russian chess player who holds the FIDE title of Woman Grandmaster
- Polina Gagarina (born 1987), Russian pop singer
- Konstantin Lokhanov (born 1998), Russian junior world champion and Olympic sabre fencer living in the United States

== See also ==
- List of Russian people
- List of Russian-language poets
