= Velikov =

Velikov (masculine, Bulgarian: Великов) or Velikova (feminine, Bulgarian: Великова) is a Bulgarian surname. Notable people with the surname include:

- Nikolai Velikov (born 1945), Russian figure skater and coach
- Ludmila Velikova (born 1947), Russian figure skater and coach
- Petar Velikov (born 1951), Bulgarian chess grandmaster
- Igor Velikov (born 1976), Bulgarian/American investor and philanthropist
- Veselin Velikov (born 1977), Bulgarian footballer
- Maxim Velikov (born 1982), Russian ice hockey player
- Radoslav Velikov (born 1983), Bulgarian freestyle wrestler
