= Volleyball at the 2008 Summer Olympics – Men's North American qualification =

The North American Qualification Tournament for the 2008 Men's Olympic Volleyball Tournament was held in Caguas, Puerto Rico from 6 to 11 January 2008.

== Venue ==
- Coliseo Héctor Solá Bezares, Caguas, Puerto Rico

== Preliminary round ==
- All times are Atlantic Standard Time (UTC−04:00).

=== Pool A ===
Pos	Team	Pld	W	L	Pts	SW	SL	SR	SPW	SPL	SPR	Qualification
1	United States	3	3	0	6	9	0	MAX	225	157	1.433	Semifinals
2	Puerto Rico	3	2	1	5	6	3	2.000	232	202	1.149	Quarterfinals
3	Dominican Republic	3	1	2	4	3	6	0.500	209	221	0.946	Quarterfinals
4	Barbados	3	0	3	3	0	9	0.000	139	225	0.618	5th–8th semifinals

Date	Time		Score		Set 1	Set 2	Set 3	Set 4	Set 5	Total
6 Jan	13:00	Dominican Republic	0–3	United States	13–25	19–25	19–25			51–75
6 Jan	18:00	Puerto Rico	3–0	Barbados	25–13	25–12	25–19			75–44
7 Jan	16:00	United States	3–0	Barbados	25–14	25–10	25–16			75–40
7 Jan	20:00	Puerto Rico	3–0	Dominican Republic	28–26	25–21	38–36			91–83
8 Jan	16:00	Barbados	0–3	Dominican Republic	19–25	19–25	17–25			55–75
8 Jan	20:00	United States	3–0	Puerto Rico	25–21	25–23	25–22			75–66

=== Pool B ===
Pos	Team	Pld	W	L	Pts	SW	SL	SR	SPW	SPL	SPR	Qualification
1	Canada	3	3	0	6	9	1	9.000	246	194	1.268	Semifinals
2	Cuba	3	2	1	5	7	3	2.333	242	193	1.254	Quarterfinals
3	Mexico	3	1	2	4	3	6	0.500	201	195	1.031	Quarterfinals
4	Trinidad and Tobago	3	0	3	3	0	9	0.000	118	225	0.524	5th–8th semifinals

Date	Time		Score		Set 1	Set 2	Set 3	Set 4	Set 5	Total
6 Jan	11:00	Canada	3–0	Trinidad and Tobago	25–9	25–14	25–15			75–38
6 Jan	15:00	Cuba	3–0	Mexico	25–19	25–23	25–20			75–62
7 Jan	14:00	Trinidad and Tobago	0–3	Mexico	20–25	13–25	11–25			44–75
7 Jan	18:00	Cuba	1–3	Canada	23–25	25–19	24–26	20–25		92–95
8 Jan	14:00	Trinidad and Tobago	0–3	Cuba	13–25	8–25	15–25			36–75
8 Jan	18:00	Mexico	0–3	Canada	21–25	19–25	24–26			64–76

== Final round ==
- All times are Atlantic Standard Time (UTC−04:00).

Quarterfinals
9 January
Cuba	3
Dominican Republic	0
9 January
Puerto Rico	3
Mexico	2

Semifinals
10 January
Cuba	0
United States	3
10 January
Canada	0
Puerto Rico	3

Final
11 January
United States	3
Puerto Rico	0
3rd place match
11 January
Cuba	3
Canada	1

5th–8th semifinals
10 January
Dominican Republic	3
Trinidad and Tobago	0
10 January
Mexico	3
Barbados	0

5th place match
11 January
Dominican Republic	1
Mexico	3
7th place match
11 January
Trinidad and Tobago	3
Barbados	2

=== Quarterfinals ===
Date	Time		Score		Set 1	Set 2	Set 3	Set 4	Set 5	Total
9 Jan	18:00	Cuba	3–0	Dominican Republic	25–15	25–21	25–23			75–59
9 Jan	20:00	Puerto Rico	3–2	Mexico	25–23	30–28	22–25	19–25	15–11	111–112

=== 5th–8th semifinals ===
Date	Time		Score		Set 1	Set 2	Set 3	Set 4	Set 5	Total
10 Jan	14:00	Dominican Republic	3–0	Trinidad and Tobago	25–17	25–22	28–26			78–65
10 Jan	16:00	Mexico	3–0	Barbados	25–13	25–15	25–17			75–45

=== Semifinals ===
Date	Time		Score		Set 1	Set 2	Set 3	Set 4	Set 5	Total
10 Jan	18:00	Cuba	0–3	United States	22–25	25–27	18–25			65–77
10 Jan	20:00	Canada	0–3	Puerto Rico	39–41	21–25	19–25			79–91

=== 7th place match ===
Date	Time		Score		Set 1	Set 2	Set 3	Set 4	Set 5	Total
11 Jan	14:00	Trinidad and Tobago	3–2	Barbados	23–25	25–18	25–19	20–25	15–11	108–98

=== 5th place match ===
Date	Time		Score		Set 1	Set 2	Set 3	Set 4	Set 5	Total
11 Jan	16:00	Dominican Republic	1–3	Mexico	25–22	21–25	20–25	20–25		86–97

=== 3rd place match ===
Date	Time		Score		Set 1	Set 2	Set 3	Set 4	Set 5	Total
11 Jan	18:00	Cuba	3–1	Canada	25–23	25–23	24–26	25–23		99–95

=== Final ===
Date	Time		Score		Set 1	Set 2	Set 3	Set 4	Set 5	Total
11 Jan	20:00	United States	3–0	Puerto Rico	25–20	25–19	25–20			75–59

== Final standing ==
Rank	Team
1	United States
2	Puerto Rico
3	Cuba
4	Canada
5	Mexico
6	Dominican Republic
7	Trinidad and Tobago
8	Barbados

Qualified for the 2008 Summer Olympics
Qualified for the 2008 World Olympic Qualification Tournaments
