= Arjun Yodh =

American physicist

- Born: Maryland

Academic background
- Education: BSc, 1981, Cornell University; MS, PhD, 1986, Harvard University
- Thesis: High-resolution collision studies of ³P₁-state Zeeman coherences using photon echoes (1986)

Academic work
- Institutions: University of Pennsylvania

Arjun Gaurang Yodh is an American physicist and the James M. Skinner Professor of Science at the University of Pennsylvania (Penn). Since 2022, he has been Chair of the Department of Physics and Astronomy, and from 2009 to 2020, he was the Director of the university's Laboratory for Research on the Structure of Matter (LRSM) and its affiliated National Science Foundation (NSF) supported Materials Research Science and Engineering Center (MRSEC). He currently conducts research in Biophotonics, especially development and clinical application of diffuse optics for noninvasive imaging and monitoring of biological tissues, and in Soft Condensed Matter Physics, particularly experimental measurements of interactions, structure, dynamics, phase transformations, and assembly in colloids, liquid crystals, and complex fluid drops.

== Early life and education ==
Born in Pittsburgh, Pennsylvania and raised in Silver Spring, Maryland, Yodh was inspired by his father's career as a physicist. During his time at Springbrook High School, Yodh was recognized as a finalist in the 1977 Westinghouse Science Talent Search and runner-up for the best scientific paper at the Maryland Junior Science and Humanities Symposium. He earned his Bachelor of Science degree in Applied and Engineering Physics from Cornell University in 1981, and he completed his M.S. (1982) and Ph.D. (1986) at Harvard University in the Division of Engineering and Applied Sciences. His Ph.D. was carried out under the mentorship of Thomas W. Mossberg. Following his doctoral studies, Yodh completed a postdoctoral fellowship at AT&T Bell Laboratories, working first with Steven Chu and then with Harry W. K. Tom. His Ph.D. and postdoctoral research were primarily in the fields of atomic physics and nonlinear optics, i.e., AMO physics.

== Career ==
Yodh joined the University of Pennsylvania faculty in 1988 as an assistant professor of physics. His early work at Penn employed laser-based techniques to investigate a diverse range of physical systems. This research explored the nature and nonlinear optical responses of solid-solid interfaces, molecular responses on surfaces to ultrashort light pulses, multiple light scattering in complex fluids, and the structure and dynamics of colloidal suspensions. Yodh was recognized by awards during this time, including the Presidential Young Investigator Award (1990–95) of the National Science Foundation (NSF), the Office of Naval Research (ONR) Young Investigator Award (1991–94), and an Alfred P. Sloan Research Fellowship (1991).

Yodh was promoted to associate professor in 1993, and he was promoted to full professor and appointed William Smith Term Professor in 1997. In 2000, he became the James M. Skinner Professor of Science. In 2009 Yodh was selected to be director of Penn's Laboratory for Research on the Structure of Matter (LRSM) and its NSF supported Materials Research Science and Engineering Center (MRSEC); he served as director until 2020. Since 2022, Yodh has been Chair of the Department of Physics and Astronomy.

In 2000, Yodh was elected Fellow of the American Physical Society (APS) for his work on diffusing light fields and the structural, dynamical, and spectroscopic properties of highly scattering materials. In years thereafter, for various accomplishments, Yodh was elected Fellow of the Optical Society of America (OSA, now Optica), of the American Association for the Advancement of Science (AAAS), and of the American Institute for Medical and Biological Engineering (AIMBE). Additionally, Yodh's research was recognized by the Langmuir Lecturer award (2006) of the American Chemical Society's Division of Colloid and Surface Chemistry, the Humboldt Research Award (2016) of the Alexander von Humboldt Foundation in Germany, and the Michael S. Feld Biophotonics Award of Optica (2021). In 2024, he was recognized by the University of Pennsylvania with the Provost's Award for Distinguished PhD Teaching and Mentoring.

== Research contributions ==
In the field of soft condensed matter physics, Yodh employs optical technologies such as laser tweezers, confocal and video microscopy, and multiple light scattering to study physics in colloids. His colloid publications report measurements of interparticle interactions, investigation of entropic forces, studies of the assembly and melting of ordered, partially ordered, and frustrated materials, studies of particle diffusion, and studies of structure, dynamics, softness, and rearrangements in colloidal glasses composed of swellable microgel particles.

Yodh also investigates other complex fluids such as liquid crystals, carbon nanotube suspensions, and fluid drops. He has, for example, published papers about coffee rings in drying drops, shape transitions of drops containing liquid crystals, and solubilization/manipulation of carbon nanotubes in suspension.

In the field of biomedical optics, Yodh has been most active in diffuse optics. In these problems, light travels through biological tissue in a manner like heat diffusion. Yodh's publications helped to introduce and translate diffuse optical measurement technologies into clinical medicine and, for the work in total, he was recognized by the 2021 Michael S. Feld Biophotonics Award of the optical society (Optica). Early on, Yodh and his collaborators published studies of tissue phantoms that identified connections between diffuse optics and traditional optical phenomena such as refraction, diffraction, scattering, fluorescence, and tomographic imaging. Working with medical doctors, he helped translate these concepts for clinical breast cancer imaging and monitoring, as well as for therapy monitoring of other cancers. In parallel, Yodh and collaborators showed how to measure blood flow in tissues with diffuse optical correlation techniques, and then with clinical collaborators, he used the full palette of diffuse optical technologies to non-invasively probe cerebral blood flow and oxygen metabolism in the human brain during functional activation and in patients with a range of brain injuries.

== Awards and honors ==
- 1990–1995: NSF Presidential Young Investigator Award
- 1991: Alfred P. Sloan Research Fellowship
- 1991-1994: ONR Young Investigator Award
- 1997: William Smith Term Professor, University of Pennsylvania
- 2000: James M. Skinner Professor of Science, University of Pennsylvania
- 2000: Fellow, American Physical Society (APS)
- 2000: Fellow, Optical Society of America (OSA, now Optica)
- 2006: Langmuir Lecturer, American Chemical Society (ACS) Division of Colloid and Surface Chemistry
- 2016: Humboldt Research Award, Alexander von Humboldt Foundation
- 2017: Fellow, American Association for the Advancement of Science (AAAS)
- 2021: Fellow, American Institute for Medical and Biological Engineering (AIMBE)
- 2021: Michael S. Feld Biophotonics Award, Optica (formerly Optical Society of America)
- 2024: Provost PhD Mentoring Prize, University of Pennsylvania
