= Igor Meglinski =

British Biomedical Engineer, Quantum Biophotonics and Optical Physicist

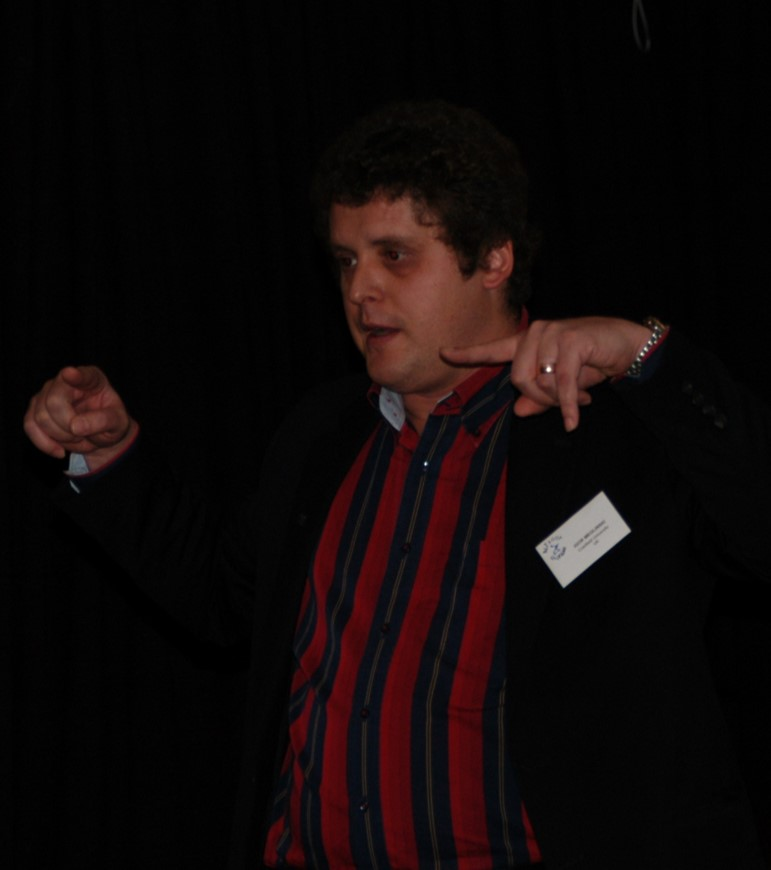
- Igor Meglinski in April 2015
- Born: April 3, 1968 (age 58); USSR
- Citizenship: United Kingdom
- Education: Saratov State University (B.S.)(M.S.); University of Pennsylvania & Saratov State University (Ph.D.)
- Known for: Polarized Light; Coherent effects of multiple scattering; Phase memory; Orbital Angular Momentum of Light; Monte Carlo method for photon transport; Diffusing-wave spectroscopy
- Awards: Top 100 in Photonics -- Electro-optics Photonics Industry Review Magazine (2024); Honorary Guest Professor Abbe School of Photonics & IPHT Jena (2023); The Royal Society APEX Research Award (2021); Innovation for the future Award IoP (2007)
- Scientific career
- Fields: Medical optical imaging, Diffusing-wave spectroscopy, Dynamic light scattering, Monte Carlo method for photon transport, Coherent backscattering, Orbital angular momentum of light, Optical vortex
- Workplaces: Aston University
- Doctoral advisors: Britton Chance and Valery Tuchin
- Other academic advisors: Arjun Yodh

Igor Meglinski is a British, New Zealand and Finnish scientist serving as a principal investigator at the College of Engineering & Physical Sciences at Aston University, where he is a professor in Quantum Biophotonics and Biomedical Engineering. He is a Faculty member in the School of Engineering and Technology at the Department of Mechanical, Biomedical & Design Engineering, and is also associated with the Aston Institute of Photonic Technologies (AIPT) and Aston Research Centre for Health in Ageing (ARCHA).

== Background and Education ==
Meglinski obtained his BSc/MSc in Laser Physics from Saratov State University. In 1994, he became the first inaugural recipient of the 'Presidential Boris Yeltsin Award,' the most prestigious award for young scientists in the Russian Federation, supporting overseas study. This accolade facilitated his pursuit of a PhD degree in 1997, which he completed at the interface between Saratov State University and the University of Pennsylvania under the supervision of Professor Britton Chance, Professor Arjun Yodh, and Professor Valery V. Tuchin. His master's research involved the development of one of the earliest versions of the Monte Carlo method for simulating the propagation of laser radiation in tissue-like highly scattering environment, including the consideration of 3D macroinhomogeneities. In the PhD studies he contributed to the invention and early development of Diffusing-wave spectroscopy (DWS) and its pioneering application for non-invasive monitoring of blood flow and superficial blood microcirculation in vivo.

== Research ==
Professor Igor Meglinski is recognized for his pioneering studies on polarization optics in turbid scattering medium, which have fundamentally reshaped our understanding of light–tissue interaction. He played a key role in advancing biomedical applications of circular polarization, polarization memory and Stokes vector depolarization composition. He pioneered the use of orbital angular momentum (OAM) in complex tissue-like scattering media, demonstrating for the first time that twisted light can retain its topological phase structure after multiple scattering. This work contributed to the emergence of a new research direction known as structured light diagnostics, which is based on the use of topological light modes. These studies were selected for publication in the Optics & Photonics News (OPN) 2024 Special Issue, which highlights the most exciting peer-reviewed optics research of the year, and were recognized for their potential to revolutionize non-invasive diagnostics using twisted light in clinical settings.

In addition, continuing his research and development of Dynamic Light Scattering (DLS)-based imaging of blood flow, he is exploring hemodynamic patterns in postmortem mice brains. He discovered more accurate way of checking blood flow in the feet of type 2 diabetes patients, and pioneered using art to bridge the gap between complex scientific findings and the public.

Currently, he explores novel phenomena at the intersection of optical polarimetry, actively contributes to the development of adaptive dynamic META-surfaces for 7D optical biopsy, and advances quantum polarimetry for next-generation tissue diagnostics.

== Publications ==
Professor Meglinski is author and co-author of over 450 scientific publications. His h-index is 56.

== Honours, awards and professional recognition ==
- 2024 Top 100 in Photonics.
- 2024 Photonics 100 in life sciences.
- 2024 Fellow of the International Institute of Acoustics and Vibration (IIAV).
- 2023 Honorary Guest Professor Abbe School of Photonics & Leibniz Institute of Photonic Technology (IPHT Jena)
- 2023 Fellow of the Royal Microscopical Society
- 2022 Fellow of Optica (society) (formerly Optical Society of America)
- 2021 APEX Award (The Royal Society)
- 2014 Fellow of The International Society for Optics and Photonic (SPIE)
- 2012 Fellow of Institute of Physics (IoP)
- 2012 Senior Member of Institute of Electrical and Electronics Engineers (IEEE)
- 2007 Innovation for the future Award IoP

== Early Research ==
After a few years of postdoctoral research at the School of Physics at the University of Exeter, Igor Meglinski joined Cranfield University in 2001 as a Lecturer and Director of the Biomedical Optical Diagnostics Laboratory within the School of Engineering. In 2007, he became the Head of Bio-Photonics & Bio-Medical Optical Diagnostics in the School of Health at Cranfield University. His research has primarily focused on a quantitative assessment of transdermal penetration of pharmaceutical and skin care product, and skin tissues chromophores and pigmentation by optical and near-infrared spectroscopy (NIR). He developed computational model of human skin for reflected spectra simulation. He also made significant contributions to the development of Optical Coherence Tomography (OCT), particularly in its application for skin and skin tissue diagnosis. Additionally, he has conducted studies applying the Monte Carlo method for simulating coherent effects in multiple scattering. He was involved in the invention of an optical method designed for analysis and monitoring. This method can be applied to detect and monitor various changes in physico-chemical parameters, concentrations of analytes, and chemical and biological processes.

Since 2009, while at the University of Otago (New Zealand), Prof. Meglinski's research has expanded to include the development of a medical device combining multispectral optoacoustic tomography and ultrasound-modulated optical tomography. This innovative device is designed to provide clear, accurate images of tissue, with the ultimate goal of enabling cancer cell analysis at much earlier stages than currently possible with existing technology, and at a significantly reduced cost. As a Node leader in the World Consortium Biophotonics4Life (BP4L), representing New Zealand on the global stage of biophotonics-based research, Prof. Meglinski actively engages in the exploration of the fundamental properties of light and ultrasound in cancer diagnostics, collaborating with clinicians at the University of Otago Dunedin School of Medicine, and with leading international scientists, while also being involved in the investigation of brain activity. He pioneered the application of circularly polarized light to distinguish between successive grades of cancer. This work demonstrated that the phase shift of polarized light backscattered from biological tissue samples carries important information about the presence of cervical intraepithelial neoplasia. In addition, in collaboration with his colleague, he developed a cloud-based online computational toolbox for the Biophotonics and Biomedical Optics scientific community, Nowadays, this toolbox is hosted at www.biophotonics.fi and is used extensively by a global audience of over 7500 users, including PhD students and young researchers.

In 2014, Meglinski returned to Europe, heading the Department of Opto-Electronic and Measurement Techniques at the Faculty of Information Technology and Electrical Engineering (ITEE) at the University of Oulu in Finland. Utilizing advanced photonics-based technologies, emerging paradigms in machine learning, and new concepts in computational modeling of light-tissue interaction, Prof. Meglinski and his team at the University of Oulu developed 'Polarization Sensitive Optical Biopsy'. This technique facilitates advanced diagnosis in cell cultures and screening of tissue samples, incorporating definitive pathology methods.Additionally, Prof. Meglinski and his team developed an Optical Tweezers (OT) based technology to investigate the impact of various nanoparticles on the mutual interaction of red blood cells. This research demonstrates the potential of OT in studying targeted drug delivery systems, providing crucial insights into how nanoparticles can influence red blood cell behavior — a key factor in the development of effective and efficient drug delivery carriers.

Since 2019 he is Professor in Quantum Biophotonics & Biomedical Engineering in Aston University, working at the interface between College of Engineering & Physical Sciences and College of Life & Health Sciences. His research focuses on quantum biophotonics and biomedical engineering, where he has pioneered the application of Orbital angular momentum of light (OAM) for the quantification of exosomes and the exploration of intracellular communication.
