= Nikolai Zlatovratsky =

Russian writer (1845–1911)

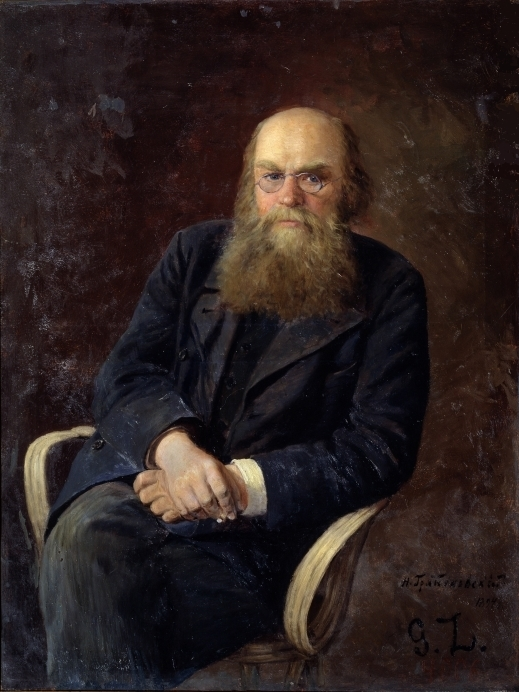
- Portrait by Nikolai Grandkovsky (1894)
- Born: December 26, 1845; Vladimir, Russian Empire
- Died: December 23, 1911 (aged 66); Moscow, Russian Empire

Nikolai Nikolaievich Zlatovratsky (Russian: Никола́й Никола́евич Златовра́тский) (December 26, 1845 – December 23, 1911), was a Russian writer.

== Biography ==
Zlatovratsky was born in Vladimir, where his father was a minor government official. His father set up a library for local people, and it was here that Zlatovratsky first became familiar with literature. He attended a gymnasium, and studied for a time at the St Petersburg Technological Institute, but had to leave for lack of money. He found a position as proof-reader at a newspaper, where he became interested in writing.

His first sketch was published in 1866. His novel Foundations (1883) was published in Annals of the Fatherland. The main subjects of his works were the peasants, and the populist intellectuals. He was a member of the Moscow literary group Sreda from its inception in 1899 until his death. He was eventually given honorary membership in the Imperial Academy of Arts. He died in Moscow in 1911.

== English translations ==
- Old Shadows, (story), from Anthology of Russian Literature, Volume 2, Leo Wiener, G.P. Putnam's Sons, 1903. from Archive.org
