= Volleyball at the 2008 Summer Olympics – Men's tournament =

Men's volleyball at the Games of the XXIX Olympiad
- Venue: Capital Indoor Stadium and Beijing Institute of Technology Gymnasium
- Date: 10–24 August
- Competitors: 144 from 12 nations

Medalists
1st place, gold medalist(s)		United States (3rd title)
2nd place, silver medalist(s)		Brazil
3rd place, bronze medalist(s)		Russia

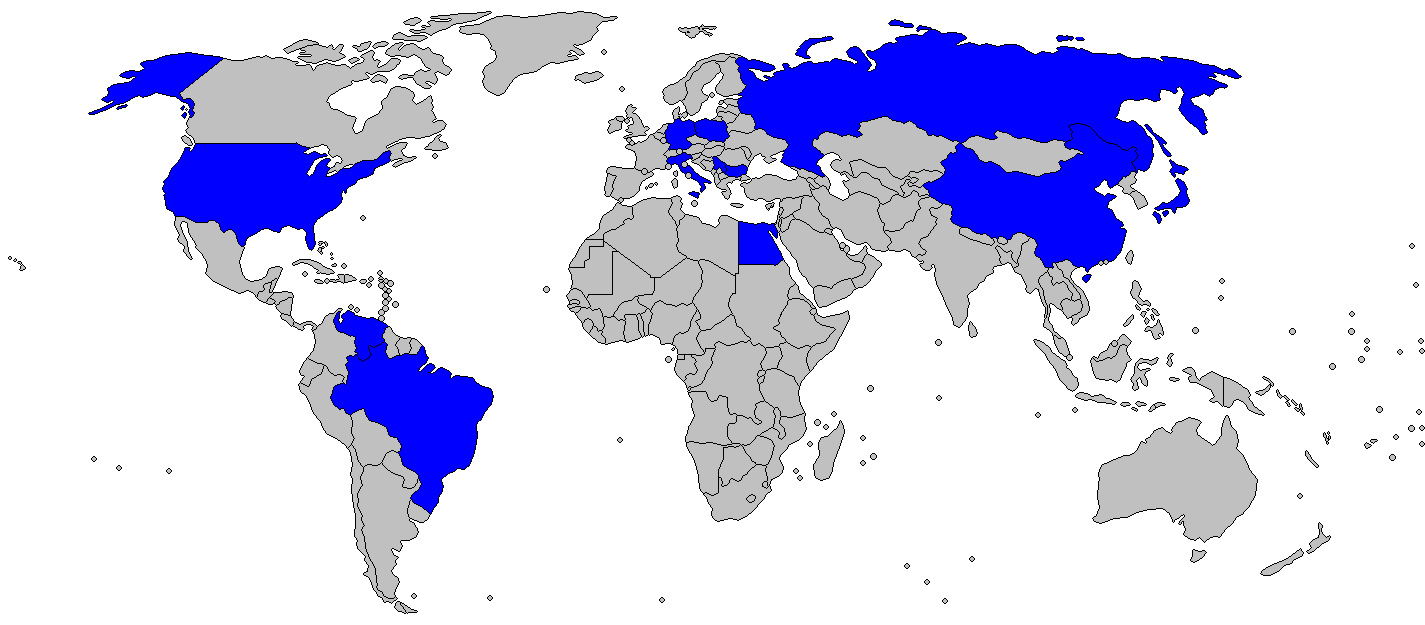
Competing teams

The men's tournament in volleyball at the 2008 Summer Olympics was the 12th edition of the event at the Summer Olympics, organized by the world's governing body, the FIVB, in conjunction with the IOC. It was held in Beijing, China from 10 to 24 August 2008.

The twelve competing teams were split equally into two pools of six teams. Each team played all other teams in their pool with the winning team gaining 2 points and the losing side 1 point. The top four teams from each pool progressed through to the quarterfinals. The rest of the tournament was a single-elimination bracket, with a bronze medal match held between the two semifinal losers.

A total of 38 matches were played: 15 in each group, 4 quarterfinals, 2 semifinals, 1 bronze medal match, and 1 gold medal match.

== Competition schedule ==
P	Preliminary round	¼	Quarter-finals	½	Semi-finals	B	Bronze medal match	F	Gold medal match

Sun 10	Mon 11	Tue 12	Wed 13	Thu 14	Fri 15	Sat 16	Sun 17	Mon 18	Tue 19	Wed 20	Thu 21	Fri 22	Sat 23	Sun 24	
P		P		P		P		P		¼		½		B	F

== Qualification ==
Means of qualification	Date	Host	Vacancies	Qualified
Host country	13 July 2001	(Russia) Moscow	1	China
2007 World Cup	18 November – 2 December 2007	Japan	3	Brazil
2007 World Cup	18 November – 2 December 2007	Japan	3	Russia
2007 World Cup	18 November – 2 December 2007	Japan	3	Bulgaria
African Qualifier	3–9 February 2008	(South Africa) Durban	1	Egypt
European Qualifier	7–13 January 2008	(Turkey) İzmir	1	Serbia
North American Qualifier	6–11 January 2008	(Puerto Rico) Caguas	1	United States
South American Qualifier	3–7 January 2008	(Argentina) Formosa	1	Venezuela
1st World Qualifier	23–25 May 2008	(Germany) Düsseldorf	1	Germany
2nd World Qualifier	30 May – 1 June 2008	(Portugal) Espinho	1	Poland
3rd World Qualifier	31 May – 8 June 2008	(Japan) Tokyo	1	Italy
Asian Qualifier (Note: The Asian Qualifier was combined with the 3rd World Qualifier. The first place team of the tournament qualified as the 3rd World Qualifier winners, while the best Asian team except the 3rd World Qualifier winners qualified as the Asian Qualifier winners.)	31 May – 8 June 2008	(Japan) Tokyo	1	Japan
Total			12	

== Pools composition ==
Teams were seeded following the serpentine system according to their FIVB World Ranking as of 3 December 2007. FIVB reserved the right to seed the hosts as head of pool A regardless of the World Ranking. Rankings are shown in brackets except the hosts who ranked 21st.

Pool A	Pool B
China (Hosts)	Brazil (1)
United States (3)	Russia (2)
Bulgaria (4)	Poland (5)
Italy (10)	Serbia (8)
Japan (12)	Egypt (14)
Venezuela (20)	Germany (19)

== Venues ==
Main venue	Sub venue
Beijing, China	Beijing, China
Capital Indoor Stadium	Beijing Institute of Technology Gymnasium
Capacity: 17,345	Capacity: 5,000

== Preliminary round ==
- All times are China Standard Time (UTC+08:00).
- The top four teams in each pool qualified for the quarterfinals.

=== Pool A ===
Pos	Team	Pld	W	L	Pts	SPW	SPL	SPR	SW	SL	SR	Qualification
1	United States	5	5	0	10	460	371	1.240	15	4	3.750	Quarterfinals
2	Italy	5	4	1	9	439	401	1.095	13	6	2.167	Quarterfinals
3	Bulgaria	5	3	2	8	446	440	1.014	10	9	1.111	Quarterfinals
4	China	5	2	3	7	445	492	0.904	9	13	0.692	Quarterfinals
5	Venezuela	5	1	4	6	421	451	0.933	8	12	0.667	
6	Japan	5	0	5	5	392	448	0.875	4	15	0.267	

10 August 2008; 12:10	Italy	3–1	Japan	Beijing Institute of Technology Gymnasium, Beijing; Attendance: 3,000; Referees: Humberto Salas (MEX), Victor Rodriguez (PUR)
10 August 2008; 12:10	(25–19, 25–18, 23–25, 25–17); Results Statistics			Beijing Institute of Technology Gymnasium, Beijing; Attendance: 3,000; Referees: Humberto Salas (MEX), Victor Rodriguez (PUR)

10 August 2008; 12:35	United States	3–2	Venezuela	Capital Indoor Stadium, Beijing; Attendance: 11,000; Referees: Konstantin Tufekchiev (BUL), Umit Sokullu (TUR)
10 August 2008; 12:35	(25–18, 25–18, 22–25, 21–25, 15–10); Results Statistics			Capital Indoor Stadium, Beijing; Attendance: 11,000; Referees: Konstantin Tufekchiev (BUL), Umit Sokullu (TUR)

10 August 2008; 20:00	Bulgaria	3–1	China	Capital Indoor Stadium, Beijing; Attendance: 11,000; Referees: Laert Souza (BRA), Mitch Davidson (CAN)
10 August 2008; 20:00	(25–20, 25–21, 26–28, 25–19); Results Statistics			Capital Indoor Stadium, Beijing; Attendance: 11,000; Referees: Laert Souza (BRA), Mitch Davidson (CAN)

12 August 2008; 12:30	United States	3–1	Italy	Capital Indoor Stadium, Beijing; Attendance: 12,500; Referees: Ibrahim Al-Naama (QAT), Kim Kun-tae (KOR)
12 August 2008; 12:30	(24–26, 25–22, 25–15, 25–21); Results Statistics			Capital Indoor Stadium, Beijing; Attendance: 12,500; Referees: Ibrahim Al-Naama (QAT), Kim Kun-tae (KOR)

12 August 2008; 20:00	Venezuela	2–3	China	Capital Indoor Stadium, Beijing; Attendance: 12,500; Referees: Massimo Menghini (ITA), Konstantin Tufekchiev (BUL)
12 August 2008; 20:00	(21–25, 25–21, 25–16, 21–25, 14–16); Results Statistics			Capital Indoor Stadium, Beijing; Attendance: 12,500; Referees: Massimo Menghini (ITA), Konstantin Tufekchiev (BUL)

12 August 2008; 22:45	Japan	1–3	Bulgaria	Capital Indoor Stadium, Beijing; Attendance: 3,200; Referees: Mitch Davidson (CAN), Victor Rodriguez (PUR)
12 August 2008; 22:45	(27–29, 25–23, 21–25, 19–25); Results Statistics			Capital Indoor Stadium, Beijing; Attendance: 3,200; Referees: Mitch Davidson (CAN), Victor Rodriguez (PUR)

14 August 2008; 10:00	Italy	3–0	Venezuela	Beijing Institute of Technology Gymnasium, Beijing; Attendance: 3,300; Referees: Mohammad Shahmiri (IRI), Mitch Davidson (CAN)
14 August 2008; 10:00	(25–21, 25–20, 25–21); Results Statistics			Beijing Institute of Technology Gymnasium, Beijing; Attendance: 3,300; Referees: Mohammad Shahmiri (IRI), Mitch Davidson (CAN)

14 August 2008; 20:00	China	3–2	Japan	Capital Indoor Stadium, Beijing; Attendance: 13,000; Referees: Bela Hobor (HUN), Frank Leuthauser (GER)
14 August 2008; 20:00	(25–20, 25–23, 17–25, 16–25, 15–10) result statistics			Capital Indoor Stadium, Beijing; Attendance: 13,000; Referees: Bela Hobor (HUN), Frank Leuthauser (GER)

14 August 2008; 22:30	Bulgaria	1–3	United States	Capital Indoor Stadium, Beijing; Attendance: 5,700; Referees: Laert Souza (BRA), Kun-Tae Kim (KOR)
14 August 2008; 22:30	(29–27, 21–25, 14–25, 24–26) result statistics			Capital Indoor Stadium, Beijing; Attendance: 5,700; Referees: Laert Souza (BRA), Kun-Tae Kim (KOR)

16 August 2008; 10:00	United States	3–0	China	Beijing Institute of Technology Gymnasium, Beijing; Attendance: 3,650; Referees: Patrick Deregnaucourt (FRA), Laert Souza (BRA)
16 August 2008; 10:00	(25–22, 25–12, 25–18) result statistics			Beijing Institute of Technology Gymnasium, Beijing; Attendance: 3,650; Referees: Patrick Deregnaucourt (FRA), Laert Souza (BRA)

16 August 2008; 14:50	Italy	3–0	Bulgaria	Capital Indoor Stadium, Beijing; Attendance: 8,000; Referees: Umit Sokullu (TUR), Mohammad Shahmiri (IRI)
16 August 2008; 14:50	(25–20, 25–21, 25–16) result statistics			Capital Indoor Stadium, Beijing; Attendance: 8,000; Referees: Umit Sokullu (TUR), Mohammad Shahmiri (IRI)

16 August 2008; 22:00	Venezuela	3–0	Japan	Capital Indoor Stadium, Beijing; Attendance: 7,500; Referees: Mitch Davidson (CAN), Victor Rodriguez (PUR)
16 August 2008; 22:00	(25–23, 25–21, 25–23) result statistics			Capital Indoor Stadium, Beijing; Attendance: 7,500; Referees: Mitch Davidson (CAN), Victor Rodriguez (PUR)

18 August 2008; 10:00	Bulgaria	3–1	Venezuela	Beijing Institute of Technology Gymnasium, Beijing; Attendance: 3,400; Referees: Mohammad Shahmiri (IRI), Laert Souza (BRA)
18 August 2008; 10:00	(23–25, 25–19, 25–16, 25–22) result statistics			Beijing Institute of Technology Gymnasium, Beijing; Attendance: 3,400; Referees: Mohammad Shahmiri (IRI), Laert Souza (BRA)

18 August 2008; 20:00	China	2–3	Italy	Capital Indoor Stadium, Beijing; Attendance: 12,500; Referees: Mitch Davidson (CAN), Humberto Salas (MEX)
18 August 2008; 20:00	(17–25, 23–25, 25–21, 25–20, 14–16) result statistics			Capital Indoor Stadium, Beijing; Attendance: 12,500; Referees: Mitch Davidson (CAN), Humberto Salas (MEX)

18 August 2008; 22:35	Japan	0–3	United States	Capital Indoor Stadium, Beijing; Attendance: 5,800; Referees: Dejan Jovanovic (SRB), Patrick Deregnaucourt (FRA)
18 August 2008; 22:35	(18–25, 12–25, 21–25) result statistics			Capital Indoor Stadium, Beijing; Attendance: 5,800; Referees: Dejan Jovanovic (SRB), Patrick Deregnaucourt (FRA)

=== Pool B ===
Pos	Team	Pld	W	L	Pts	SPW	SPL	SPR	SW	SL	SR	Qualification
1	Brazil	5	4	1	9	427	373	1.145	13	4	3.250	Quarterfinals
2	Russia	5	4	1	9	496	447	1.110	14	7	2.000	Quarterfinals
3	Poland	5	4	1	9	434	404	1.074	12	6	2.000	Quarterfinals
4	Serbia	5	2	3	7	440	439	1.002	9	10	0.900	Quarterfinals
5	Germany	5	1	4	6	418	440	0.950	6	12	0.500	
6	Egypt	5	0	5	5	267	379	0.704	0	15	0.000	

10 August 2008; 10:00	Serbia	1–3	Russia	Beijing Institute of Technology Gymnasium, Beijing; Attendance: 3,100; Referees: Bela Hobor (HUN), Osamu Sakaide (JPN)
10 August 2008; 10:00	(25–20, 21–25, 22–25, 14–25) result statistics			Beijing Institute of Technology Gymnasium, Beijing; Attendance: 3,100; Referees: Bela Hobor (HUN), Osamu Sakaide (JPN)

10 August 2008; 15:20	Brazil	3–0	Egypt	Capital Indoor Stadium, Beijing; Attendance: 8,500; Referees: Ning Wang (CHN), Mohammad Shahmiri (IRI)
10 August 2008; 15:20	(25–19, 25–15, 25–18) result statistics			Capital Indoor Stadium, Beijing; Attendance: 8,500; Referees: Ning Wang (CHN), Mohammad Shahmiri (IRI)

10 August 2008; 22:20	Poland	3–0	Germany	Capital Indoor Stadium, Beijing; Attendance: 5,700; Referees: Frans Loderus (NED), Massimo Menghini (ITA)
10 August 2008; 22:20	(25–17, 33–31, 25–20) result statistics			Capital Indoor Stadium, Beijing; Attendance: 5,700; Referees: Frans Loderus (NED), Massimo Menghini (ITA)

12 August 2008; 10:00	Russia	3–2	Germany	Beijing Institute of Technology Gymnasium, Beijing; Attendance: 3,500; Referees: Patrick Deregnaucourt (FRA), Bela Hobor (HUN)
12 August 2008; 10:00	(25–27, 25–21, 21–25, 25–23, 16–14) result statistics			Beijing Institute of Technology Gymnasium, Beijing; Attendance: 3,500; Referees: Patrick Deregnaucourt (FRA), Bela Hobor (HUN)

12 August 2008; 13:00	Egypt	0–3	Poland	Beijing Institute of Technology Gymnasium, Beijing; Attendance: 3,000; Referees: Mohammad Shahmiri (IRI), Patricia Salvatore (USA)
12 August 2008; 13:00	(21–25, 18–25, 10–25) result statistics			Beijing Institute of Technology Gymnasium, Beijing; Attendance: 3,000; Referees: Mohammad Shahmiri (IRI), Patricia Salvatore (USA)

12 August 2008; 15:00	Serbia	1–3	Brazil	Capital Indoor Stadium, Beijing; Attendance: 9,000; Referees: Ning Wang (CHN), Osamu Sakaide (JPN)
12 August 2008; 15:00	(27–25, 20–25, 17–25, 21–25) result statistics			Capital Indoor Stadium, Beijing; Attendance: 9,000; Referees: Ning Wang (CHN), Osamu Sakaide (JPN)

14 August 2008; 12:00	Germany	3–0	Egypt	Beijing Institute of Technology Gymnasium, Beijing; Attendance: 3,200; Referees: Ibrahim Al-Naama (QAT), Jiang Liu (CHN)
14 August 2008; 12:00	(29–27, 25–21, 25–21) result statistics			Beijing Institute of Technology Gymnasium, Beijing; Attendance: 3,200; Referees: Ibrahim Al-Naama (QAT), Jiang Liu (CHN)

14 August 2008; 12:30	Brazil	1–3	Russia	Capital Indoor Stadium, Beijing; Attendance: 12,000; Referees: Victor Rodriguez (PUR), Ning Wang (CHN)
14 August 2008; 12:30	(25–22, 24–26, 29–31, 19–25) result statistics			Capital Indoor Stadium, Beijing; Attendance: 12,000; Referees: Victor Rodriguez (PUR), Ning Wang (CHN)

14 August 2008; 15:05	Poland	3–1	Serbia	Capital Indoor Stadium, Beijing; Attendance: 7,000; Referees: Umit Sokullu (TUR), Patrick Deregnaucourt (FRA)
14 August 2008; 15:05	(31–29, 22–25, 25–22, 25–21) result statistics			Capital Indoor Stadium, Beijing; Attendance: 7,000; Referees: Umit Sokullu (TUR), Patrick Deregnaucourt (FRA)

16 August 2008; 12:00	Russia	3–0	Egypt	Beijing Institute of Technology Gymnasium, Beijing; Attendance: 3,200; Referees: Jiang Liu (CHN), Ibrahim Al-Naama (QAT)
16 August 2008; 12:00	(25–19, 25–14, 25–18) result statistics			Beijing Institute of Technology Gymnasium, Beijing; Attendance: 3,200; Referees: Jiang Liu (CHN), Ibrahim Al-Naama (QAT)

16 August 2008; 12:30	Serbia	3–1	Germany	Capital Indoor Stadium, Beijing; Attendance: 12,500; Referees: Ning Wang (CHN), Bela Hobor (HUN)
16 August 2008; 12:30	(25–21, 27–25, 24–26, 25–23) result statistics			Capital Indoor Stadium, Beijing; Attendance: 12,500; Referees: Ning Wang (CHN), Bela Hobor (HUN)

16 August 2008; 20:00	Brazil	3–0	Poland	Capital Indoor Stadium, Beijing; Attendance: 12,500; Referees: Kun-Tae Kim (KOR), Osamu Sakaide (JPN)
16 August 2008; 20:00	(30–28, 25–19, 25–19) result statistics			Capital Indoor Stadium, Beijing; Attendance: 12,500; Referees: Kun-Tae Kim (KOR), Osamu Sakaide (JPN)

18 August 2008; 12:20	Germany	0–3	Brazil	Beijing Institute of Technology Gymnasium, Beijing; Attendance: 3,400; Referees: Jiang Liu (CHN), Umit Sokullu (TUR)
18 August 2008; 12:20	(22–25, 21–25, 23–25) result statistics			Beijing Institute of Technology Gymnasium, Beijing; Attendance: 3,400; Referees: Jiang Liu (CHN), Umit Sokullu (TUR)

18 August 2008; 12:30	Poland	3–2	Russia	Capital Indoor Stadium, Beijing; Attendance: 12,000; Referees: Frans Loderus (NED), Frank Leuthauser (GER)
18 August 2008; 12:30	(17–25, 26–24, 24–26, 25–23, 15–12) result statistics			Capital Indoor Stadium, Beijing; Attendance: 12,000; Referees: Frans Loderus (NED), Frank Leuthauser (GER)

18 August 2008; 15:15	Egypt	0–3	Serbia	Capital Indoor Stadium, Beijing; Attendance: 6,000; Referees: Victor Rodriguez (PUR), Ibrahim Al-Naama (QAT)
18 August 2008; 15:15	(16–25, 13–25, 17–25) result statistics			Capital Indoor Stadium, Beijing; Attendance: 6,000; Referees: Victor Rodriguez (PUR), Ibrahim Al-Naama (QAT)

== Final round ==
- All times are China Standard Time (UTC+08:00).
- The first ranked teams of both pools played against the fourth ranked teams of the other pool. The second ranked teams faced the second or third ranked teams of the other pool, determined by drawing of lots. The drawing of lots was held after the last match in the preliminary round.

Quarterfinals
20 August
United States	3
Serbia	2
20 August
Bulgaria	1
Russia	3
20 August
Italy	3
Poland	2
20 August
China	0
Brazil	3

Semifinals
22 August
United States	3
Russia	2
22 August
Italy	1
Brazil	3

Gold medal match
24 August
United States	3
Brazil	1
Bronze medal match
24 August
Russia	3
Italy	0

=== Quarterfinals ===
20 August 2008; 10:00	Bulgaria	1–3	Russia	Capital Indoor Stadium, Beijing; Attendance: 11,500; Referees: Bela Hobor (HUN), Frans Loderus (NED)
20 August 2008; 10:00	(25–20, 16–25, 22–25, 21–25) result statistics			Capital Indoor Stadium, Beijing; Attendance: 11,500; Referees: Bela Hobor (HUN), Frans Loderus (NED)

20 August 2008; 12:15	Italy	3–2	Poland	Capital Indoor Stadium, Beijing; Attendance: 8,000; Referees: Umit Sokullu (TUR), Patrick Deregnaucourt (FRA)
20 August 2008; 12:15	(25–19, 25–22, 18–25, 26–28, 17–15) result statistics			Capital Indoor Stadium, Beijing; Attendance: 8,000; Referees: Umit Sokullu (TUR), Patrick Deregnaucourt (FRA)

20 August 2008; 20:00	China	0–3	Brazil	Capital Indoor Stadium, Beijing; Attendance: 13,000; Referees: Massimo Menghini (ITA), Frank Leuthauser (GER)
20 August 2008; 20:00	(17–25, 15–25, 16–25) result statistics			Capital Indoor Stadium, Beijing; Attendance: 13,000; Referees: Massimo Menghini (ITA), Frank Leuthauser (GER)

20 August 2008; 22:01	United States	3–2	Serbia	Capital Indoor Stadium, Beijing; Attendance: 7,500; Referees: Ning Wang (CHN), Mohammad Shahmiri (IRI)
20 August 2008; 22:01	(20–25, 25–23, 21–25, 25–18, 15–12) result statistics			Capital Indoor Stadium, Beijing; Attendance: 7,500; Referees: Ning Wang (CHN), Mohammad Shahmiri (IRI)

=== Semifinals ===
22 August 2008; 12:35	United States	3–2	Russia	Capital Indoor Stadium, Beijing; Attendance: 12,500; Referees: Osamu Sakaide (JPN), Ibrahim Al-Naama (QAT)
22 August 2008; 12:35	(25–22, 25–21, 25–27, 22–25, 15–13) result statistics			Capital Indoor Stadium, Beijing; Attendance: 12,500; Referees: Osamu Sakaide (JPN), Ibrahim Al-Naama (QAT)

22 August 2008; 20:00	Italy	1–3	Brazil	Capital Indoor Stadium, Beijing; Attendance: 12,500; Referees: Kun-Tae Kim (KOR), Humberto Salas (MEX)
22 August 2008; 20:00	(25–19, 18–25, 21–25, 22–25) result statistics			Capital Indoor Stadium, Beijing; Attendance: 12,500; Referees: Kun-Tae Kim (KOR), Humberto Salas (MEX)

=== Bronze medal match ===
24 August 2008; 10:00	(bronze) Russia	3–0	Italy	Capital Indoor Stadium, Beijing; Attendance: 11,500; Referees: Frank Leuthauser (GER), Dejan Jovanovic (SRB)
24 August 2008; 10:00	(25–22, 25–19, 25–23) result statistics			Capital Indoor Stadium, Beijing; Attendance: 11,500; Referees: Frank Leuthauser (GER), Dejan Jovanovic (SRB)

=== Gold medal match ===
24 August 2008; 12:00	(gold) United States	3–1	Brazil (silver)	Capital Indoor Stadium, Beijing; Attendance: 13,000; Referees: Ning Wang (CHN), Bela Hobor (HUN)
24 August 2008; 12:00	(20–25, 25–22, 25–21, 25–23) result statistics			Capital Indoor Stadium, Beijing; Attendance: 13,000; Referees: Ning Wang (CHN), Bela Hobor (HUN)

== Final standing ==
Rank	Team
1st place, gold medalist(s)	United States
2nd place, silver medalist(s)	Brazil
3rd place, bronze medalist(s)	Russia
4	Italy
5	Bulgaria
5	China
5	Poland
5	Serbia
9	Germany
9	Venezuela
11	Egypt
11	Japan

2008 Men's Olympic champions

United States
3rd title

12–man roster
Lloy Ball, Sean Rooney, David Lee, Rich Lambourne (L), Reid Priddy, Ryan Millar, Riley Salmon, Tom Hoff (c), Clay Stanley, Kevin Hansen, Gabe Gardner, Scott Touzinsky
Head coach
Hugh McCutcheon

== Medalists ==
Gold	Silver	Bronze
United States Lloy Ball; Sean Rooney; David Lee; Rich Lambourne (L); Reid Priddy; Ryan Millar; Riley Salmon; Tom Hoff (c); Clay Stanley; Kevin Hansen; Gabriel Gardner; Scott Touzinsky Head coach: Hugh McCutcheon	Brazil Bruno Rezende; Marcelo Elgarten; André Heller; Samuel Fuchs; Giba (c); Murilo Endres; André Nascimento; Sérgio Santos (L); Anderson Rodrigues; Gustavo Endres; Rodrigo Santana; Dante Amaral Head coach: Bernardinho	Russia Aleksandr Korneev; Semyon Poltavskiy; Aleksandr Kosarev; Sergey Grankin; Sergey Tetyukhin; Vadim Khamuttskikh (c); Yury Berezhko; Aleksey Ostapenko; Aleksandr Volkov; Aleksey Verbov (L); Maxim Mikhaylov; Aleksey Kuleshov Head coach: Vladimir Alekno

== Awards ==
- Most valuable player
  (United States) Clayton Stanley
- Best scorer
  (United States) Clayton Stanley
- Best spiker
  (Poland) Sebastian Świderski
- Best blocker
  (Brazil) Gustavo Endres
- Best server
  (United States) Clayton Stanley
- Best digger
  (Russia) Aleksey Verbov
- Best setter
  (Poland) Paweł Zagumny
- Best receiver
  (Poland) Michał Winiarski
- Best libero
  (Italy) Mirko Corsano
