= In the Style of Jazz =

- Directed by: Stanislav Govorukhin
- Written by: Ksenya Stepanycheva; Stanislav Govorukhin
- Produced by: Stanislav Govorukhin; Alexander Prosyanov
- Starring: Michał Żebrowski; Olga Krasko; Elena Yakovleva
- Cinematography: Alisher Khamidkhozhayev
- Music by: David Goloschekin
- Production company: Mosfilm
- Release date: November 4, 2010 (Pegards de Russie)
- Running time: 90 minutes
- Country: Russia
- Language: Russian

In the Style of Jazz (Russian: …в сти́ле JAZZ, romanized: …v stile JAZZ) is a 2010 romantic comedy directed by Stanislav Govorukhin.

== Plot ==
The protagonist is a successful young man with charm and the ability to please all women regardless of their age and position in society. The heroine is a girl of twenty-six, with a head gone to work, disappointed in love and no longer dreaming of a woman's happiness. But ... he gets acquainted with her younger sister and mother, still a beauty. Over time, they find themselves in the power of the hero's charm.

== Cast ==
- Michał Żebrowski as Sergei Vladimirovich Saveliev, writer (voiced by Viktor Rakov)
- Olga Krasko as Irina, the eldest daughter, an actress
- Elena Yakovleva as Vera Dmitrievna, mother, stewardess
- Aglaya Shilovskaya as Zhenya, the youngest daughter, a student
- Anatoly Bely as actor
- Tatyana Ustinova as Tanya, Sergey's ex-wife, a successful writer (actually - cameo)
- Marat Basharov as actor
- Fyodor Dobronravov as Lieutenant Colonel
- Roman Kartsev asOdessa taxi driver
- Anna Samokhina as wife of Victor Ivanovich
- Viktor Sukhorukov as Viktor Ivanovich, director
- Irina Skobtseva as former mother-in-law of Sergey Saveliev
- Olesya Zhurakovskaya as waitress in an Odessa restaurant

== Awards ==
- 2010 — Golden Rook Рrize for the first place in the contest Vyborg Аaccount of the XVIII annual Russian film festival "Window to Europe".
- 2011 — Grand Prix (Audience Choice Award) of the XIX All-Russian Film Festival Vivat, Cinema of Russia! In St. Petersburg
