= Isaak Zelensky =

Russian-Soviet politician (1890–1938)

- Исаак Зеленский
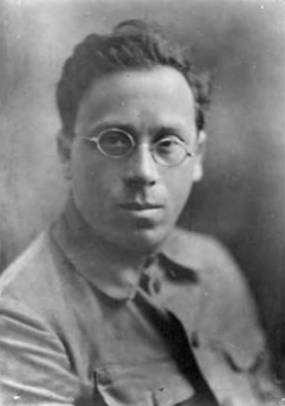
- Zelensky in 1937

First Secretary of the Central Committee of the Communist Party of Uzbekistan
- In office 11 June 1929 – December 1929
- Preceded by: Nikolai Gikalo
- Succeeded by: Akmal Ikramov

First Secretary of the Moscow Committee of the Russian Communist Party (Bolsheviks)
- In office 4 April 1921 – September 1924
- Preceded by: Varvara Yakovleva
- Succeeded by: Nikolai Uglanov

Personal details
- Born: 22 June 1890 Saratov, Russian Empire
- Died: 15 March 1938 (aged 47) Kommunarka shooting ground, Moscow, RSFSR, Soviet Union
- Party: Russian Social Democratic Labour Party (Bolsheviks) (1906–1918); All-Union Communist Party (b) (1918–1937)

Isaak Abramovich Zelensky (Russian: Исаа́к Абра́мович Зеле́нский; 22 June 1890 – 15 March 1938) was a Soviet politician, Communist Party official, and a victim of the Great Purge. In 1929, he was briefly Secretary General of the Uzbek Soviet Socialist Republic.

== Early life ==
Isaak Zelensky was born in 1890, in Saratov as the son of a craftsman's Jewish family. There he completed his schooling, and in 1906 he joined the Bolshevik faction of the Russian Social Democratic Labour Party, which later became the Communist Party of the Soviet Union. He worked as a party propagandist in several Russian cities, including Orenburg, Penza, Samara, Tsaritsyn and Moscow, and was arrested several times.

In February 1912, he was exiled to the Narym region of Siberia. In 1915, he was arrested again and exiled to Irkutsk in Siberia. However, he managed to escape a year later. During the Russian Revolution of 1917, he fought for the Bolsheviks in Moscow. During the Russian Civil War, he was responsible for supplies in Moscow, which involved forcibly confiscating produce from peasants.

== Career ==
In 1921, Zelensky was appointed first secretary of the Moscow communist party. and from 1922 he was elected a full member of the Central Committee in 1922 by the 11th Party Congress. As First Secretary of the Moscow City Committee, Zelensky served on the commission that arranged the burial of Lenin in 1924.

In June 1924, he was promoted to the rank of Secretary of the Central Committee, working alongside the General Secretary, Joseph Stalin. According to the evidence given at his trial in 1938, Zelensky's brother, Alexander, was exposed in 1924 as a former agent of the Tsarist secret police, the Okhrana, and shot.

He was demoted in August 1924 by being sent to Tashkent to participate in building up the party structures. He was secretary of the Central Asian bureau of the Communist Party in 1924–1929. In 1929, he was briefly the General Secretary of the Communist Party of Uzbekistan, but in December Akmal Ikramov replaced him as the first ethnic Uzbek in this position. The next year Zelensky tried to depose him, but since the Central Committee supported Ikramov, this attempt failed. Zelensky was recalled to Moscow in 1931 to run the state consumer distribution network.

== Show trial ==
Zelensky was arrested in August 1937. On 21 October, his name was included on a death list sent to Stalin, who crossed it off. The apparent reason for this stay of execution was that Stalin wanted to use an upcoming show to deflect blame for the shortage of consumer goods. Zelensky was reputedly humiliated and tortured to break him. According to Aleksandr Solzhenitsyn, "Zelensky was whipped with ramrods with his pants pulled down."

In March 1938, he was a defendant in the last and biggest of the Moscow Show Trials, the Trial of the Twenty-One. During the trial, he "confessed" to have been an Okhrana spy, like his brother, since 1911, and that while he was in charge of consumer goods he had arranged to sabotage food distribution by having nails inserted in butter and allowing fifty truckloads of eggs to be spoiled. Zelensky was sentenced to death and was executed on 15 March, 1938.

== Legacy ==
In 1959, he was posthumously rehabilitated. In 1988, the Soviet authorities announced that the entire trial had been fabricated.

== See also ==
- List of people from Saratov
