= Ksenya Stepanycheva =

Russian playwright (born 1978)

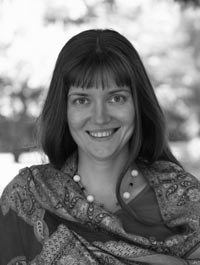
- Born: November 4, 1978 (age 47); Saratov, Russia

Ksenya Viktorovna Stepanycheva (Russian: Ксения Викторовна Степанычева, born November 4, 1978) is a Russian playwright.

Ksenya Stepanycheva was born in the city of Saratov on November 4, 1978, into the family of a military serviceman. She lived with her father in military garrisons in Germany, Ukraine and the subarctic region. She graduated from the Povozhskaya Civil Service Academy and got an honors degree of a manager and economist.

Her play 2 х 2 = 5 received First Prize at the All-Russian Competition of Playwrights, Protagonist (Deystvuyushiye litsa Russian: Действующие лица), 2004, and was staged by the School of Modern Drama Theater in Moscow and at the Saratov Drama Theater.

Kseniya is the author of such plays as 2 х 2 = 5, Private Life, Pink Bow, Staf, Divine Foam, and The Cossacks' Tales.

Four of Kseniya's plays were published in Modern Dramatics magazine. Pink Bow was published in The World of Children's Theater magazine. In 2004 she was awarded with the main prize in the "Dramatis Personae" annual contest of playwrights.

In April 2009 together with other young playwrights of Russia she undertook in-depth training at Princeton University (New Jersey, United States).

Her play 2 х 2 = 5 was staged at the Saratovskiy Academical Theater in 2005, at "The School of a Modern Play" Moscow theater in 2007, and other theatres in Donetsk (Ukraine) and Tomsk (Russia).

In 2009 Stanislav Govorukhin, a famous Russian film director, started to shoot a movie by Kseniya's script; the movie's name is In the Style of Jazz.

Private Life (Russian: Частная жизнь) by Kseniya Stepanycheva was staged at the Saratovskiy Academical Theater in 2009.
