= Lev Igorev =

Russian painter

Lev Stepanovich Igorev
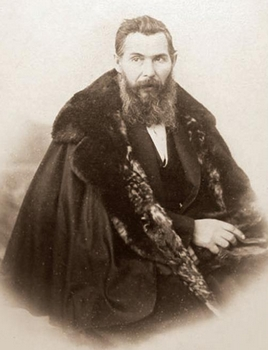
- Born: February 10, 1821; Komarovka, Kuznetsky Uyezd, Saratov Governorate
- Died: December 29, 1893 (aged 72); Saratov
- Occupation: Painter

Lev Stepanovich Igorev (Russian: Лев Степанович Игорев; 10 February 1821 in Komarovka, Saratov Governorate – 29 December 1893 in Saratov) was a Russian portrait painter in the Academic style.

== Biography ==
His father was the sexton at a small church. He attended a religious school in Petrovsk then, in 1838, he and his brother Sergei entered the Saratov Theological Seminary; graduating in 1844. During his stay, he made drawings of several church officials, including Bishop Yakov, who became his patron.

He was initially assigned to the village of Rudno in Kamyshinsky District, but the portraits he had done at the seminary made him interested in pursuing formal studies in art, so he applied to the Saint Petersburg Theological Academy for lessons that would enable him to become an art teacher at a religious school.

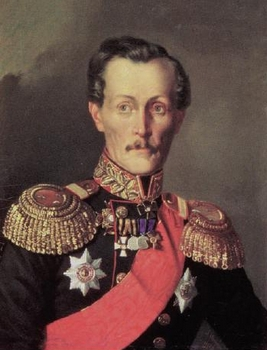
Karl-Burgardt Wenzel, Governor of Irkutsk

While there, he also audited classes at the Imperial Academy of Arts and his work won praise from Fyodor Tolstoy. In 1850, he was awarded the title of "Artist" and, in 1853, was named an Academician for his portrait of Macarius Bulgakov. In 1855, he became a teacher at the Theological Academy. At that time, he created icons for numerous churches in rural districts, as well as Saint Petersburg. He also created a medallion with the image of Mary for presentation to the Tsarina, Maria Alexandrovna.

=== Mission to China ===
After less than two years as a teacher, he volunteered for the fourteenth Russian Spiritual Mission to Beijing and, in 1857, became the mission's official artist. The mission was delayed by events related to the Taiping Rebellion, so he spent a year in Irkutsk. While there, he painted portraits of prominent Siberian statesmen such as Nikolay Muravyov-Amursky and Karl-Burgardt Wenzel.

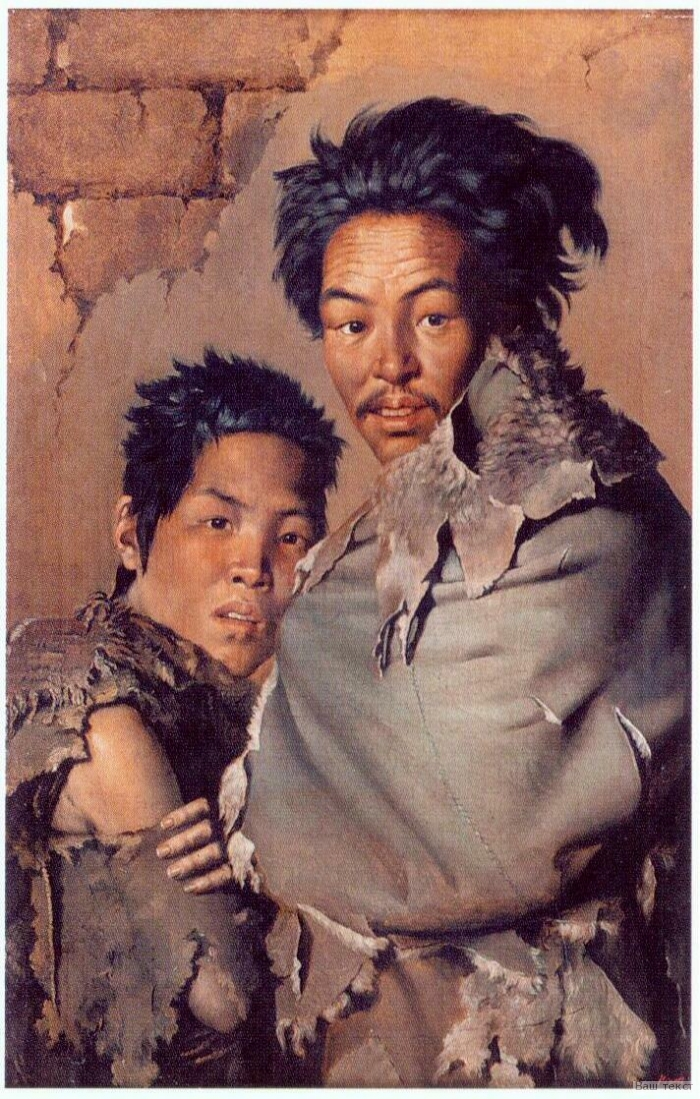
Chinese Beggars in the Cold

While in Beijing, his primary mission was replacing Albazinian icons that had been destroyed in 1685 by the Qing Army (and were destroyed again during the Cultural Revolution). In 1863, he was charged with delivering a diplomatic message to Admiral Popov in Shanghai.

Upon returning to Saint Petersburg in 1864, he mounted a major exhibition at the Academy, with genre scenes and portraits of Chinese officials and their families. He was also awarded the Order of Saint Stanislaus. Following that, he worked primarily as an icon painter, working in Kostroma, Novgorod, Vologda and Arzamas. In 1885, he did most of the decorative work for the newly rebuilt Church of the Intercession in Saratov. In 1890, he went to live there with his widowed sisters and wrote his memoirs. He died of paralysis after several trips to the village of Sleptsovka to make funeral arrangements for another sister.

Most of his church works were destroyed during the Soviet period. The current locations of all but two of the works he painted in China are unknown. In 1950, an unfinished posthumous portrait of Alexander Griboyedov was identified as his.
