= Harry W. K. Tom =

American physicist and professor

Harry W. K. Tom is a physicist and professor at the University of California, Riverside. He was elected a fellow of the American Physical Society in 2000, "[f]or pioneering contributions to our understanding of the ultrafast dynamics of surface chemical and physical reactions, particularly femtosecond laser-induced nonequilibrium phase transitions and chemical reactions."
