= Sergei Nikolayev (ice hockey) =

Russian ice hockey player

- Born: 8 June 1972 (age 53) Saratov, Russian SFSR, Soviet Union
- Height: 5 ft 10 in (178 cm)
- Weight: 194 lb (88 kg; 13 st 12 lb)
- Position: Goaltender
- Caught: Left
- Played for: Kristall Saratov; Torpedo Yaroslavl; Khimik Voskresensk; Lada Togliatti; Severstal Cherepovets; SKA Saint Petersburg; Salavat Yulaev Ufa; Sibir Novosibirsk; Metallurg Novokuznetsk
- Playing career: 1988–2011

Sergei Gennadyevich Nikolaev (Russian: Сергей Геннадьевич Николаев; born 8 June 1972) is a Russian retired professional ice hockey goaltender.

== Career ==
Nikolaev played in the Russian Superleague for Kristall Saratov, Torpedo Yaroslavl, Khimik Voskresensk, Lada Togliatti, Severstal Cherepovets, SKA Saint Petersburg, Salavat Yulaev Ufa, Sibir Novosibirsk and Metallurg Novokuznetsk. He also spent three seasons with Ak Bars Kazan in the Superleague's successor Kontinental Hockey League but didn't play a game for the team.
