= Elvira T =

Russian singer and songwriter (born 1994)

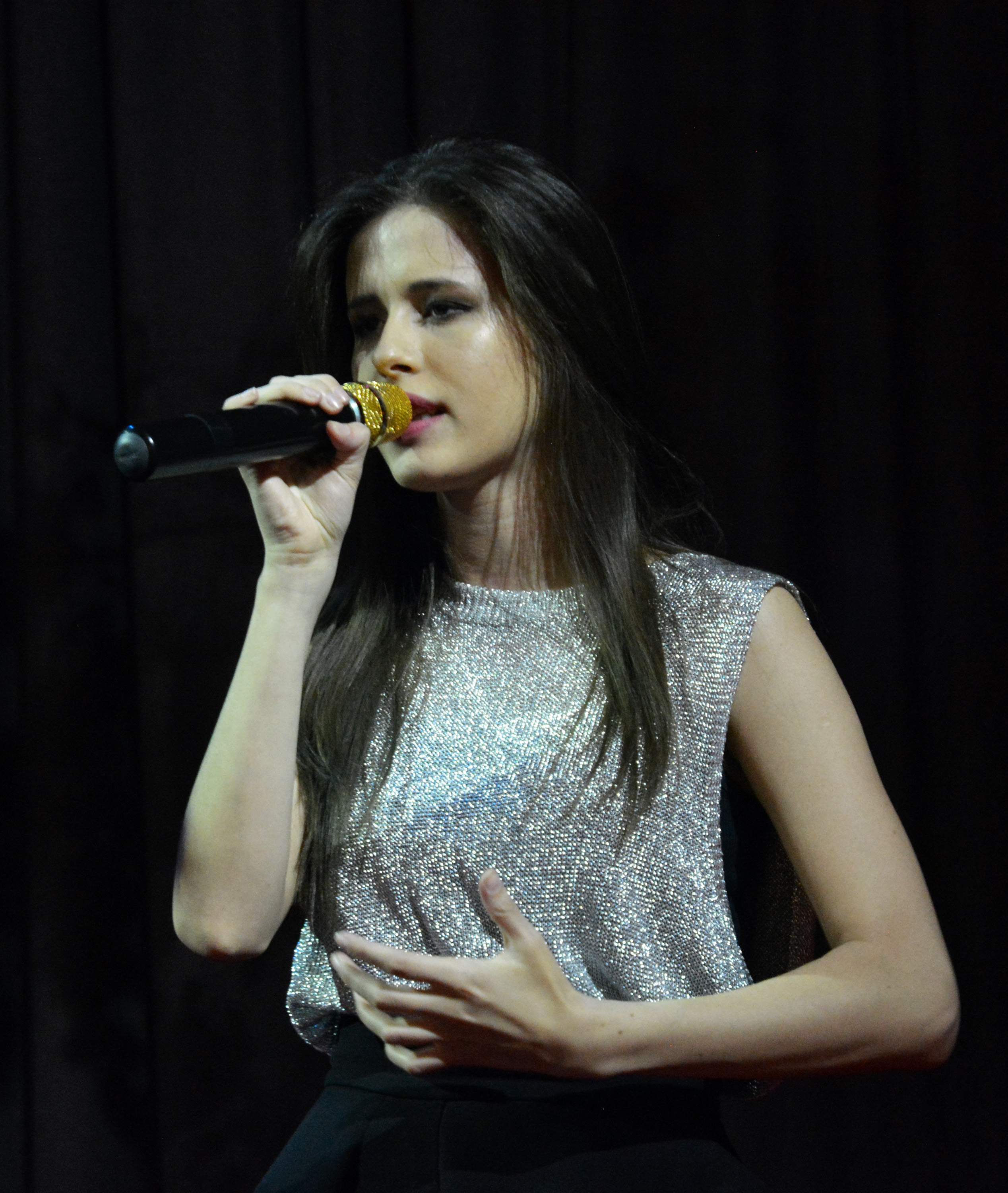
- Elvira T at the New Wave Junior Party
- Born: Elvira Sergeevna Tugusheva; 14 August 1994 (age 32); Saratov, Russia
- Years active: 2010 - present
- Height: 165 cm (5 ft 5 in) (Instagram); 169 cm (5 ft 7 in) (other sources)
- Website: elviramusic.ru

Elvira Sergeevna Tugusheva (Russian: Эльвира Сергеевна Тугушева, born 14 August 1994 in Saratov, Russia), better known by her stage name Elvira T is a Russian singer and songwriter. After the success of Elvira T's YouTube song "Всё решено" (Vsyo Resheno, "All is Decided") when she was 15, she quickly rose to fame with the song hitting the top 20 charts in Russia, and coming into the top 100 of Europe.

She later moved from Saratov to Moscow, enrolling in MGUKI where she continued to write songs.
