= Volleyball at the 2008 Summer Olympics – Men's qualification =

2008 Volleyball at the Summer Olympics – Men's qualification
- Dates: 1 September 2007 – 8 June 2008
- Teams: 31 (from 5 confederations)

The qualification for the 2008 Men's Olympic Volleyball Tournament was held from 1 September 2007 to 8 June 2008.

== Means of qualification ==
Qualified for the 2008 Summer Olympics
Qualified for the 2008 World Olympic Qualification Tournaments

== Host country ==
FIVB reserved a vacancy for the 2008 Summer Olympics host country to participate in the tournament.

- China

== 2007 World Cup ==
- Venues: Japan
- Dates: 18 November – 2 December 2007
- The top three teams qualified for the 2008 Summer Olympics.

Rank	Team
1st place, gold medalist(s)	Brazil
2nd place, silver medalist(s)	Russia
3rd place, bronze medalist(s)	Bulgaria
4	United States
5	Spain
6	Puerto Rico
7	Argentina
8	Australia
9	Japan
10	Egypt
11	South Korea
12	Tunisia

== Continental qualification tournaments ==
=== Africa ===
- Venue: Tongaat Hall, Durban, South Africa
- Dates: 3–9 February 2008
- The winners qualified for the 2008 Summer Olympics. The runners-up qualified for the 2008 World Olympic Qualification Tournaments.

Rank	Team
1	Egypt
2	Algeria
3	Cameroon
4	Tunisia
5	Morocco
5	South Africa
7	Gabon
7	Nigeria
9	Mozambique
9	Rwanda

=== Asia and Oceania ===
The 2008 Asian Olympic Qualification Tournament combined with 2008 3rd World Olympic Qualification Tournament. The hosts Japan and the top four ranked teams except Japan from the 2007 Asian Championship competed in the tournament. The top ranked among the five teams except the 2008 3rd World Olympic Qualification Tournament winners qualified for the 2008 Summer Olympics as the 2008 Asian Olympic Qualification Tournament winners.

=== Europe ===
- Venue: Halkapınar Sport Hall, İzmir, Turkey
- Dates: 7–13 January 2008
- The winners qualified for the 2008 Summer Olympics.

Rank	Team
1	Serbia
2	Spain
3	Finland
3	Netherlands
5	Germany
5	Poland
7	Italy
7	Turkey

=== North America ===
- Venue: Coliseo Héctor Solá Bezares, Caguas, Puerto Rico
- Dates: 6–11 January 2008
- The winners qualified for the 2008 Summer Olympics. The second and third ranked teams qualified for the 2008 World Olympic Qualification Tournaments.

Rank	Team
1	United States
2	Puerto Rico
3	Cuba
4	Canada
5	Mexico
6	Dominican Republic
7	Trinidad and Tobago
8	Barbados

=== South America ===
- Venue: Estadio Cincuentenario, Formosa, Argentina
- Dates: 3–7 January 2008
- All times are Argentina Time (UTC−03:00).
- The winners qualified for the 2008 Summer Olympics. The runners-up qualified for the 2008 World Olympic Qualification Tournaments.

Pos	Team	Pld	W	L	Pts	SW	SL	SR	SPW	SPL	SPR	Qualification
1	Venezuela	4	4	0	8	12	1	12.000	322	233	1.382	2008 Summer Olympics
2	Argentina	4	3	1	7	10	3	3.333	309	244	1.266	2008 World Olympic Qualification Tournaments
3	Paraguay	4	2	2	6	6	9	0.667	301	334	0.901	
4	Chile	4	1	3	5	5	9	0.556	278	320	0.869	
5	Uruguay	4	0	4	4	1	12	0.083	244	323	0.755	

Date	Time		Score		Set 1	Set 2	Set 3	Set 4	Set 5	Total	Report
3 Jan	17:30	Chile	2–3	Paraguay	27–25	14–25	25–18	24–26	10–15	100–109	P2
3 Jan	20:15	Argentina	3–0	Uruguay	25–16	25–16	25–16			75–48	P2
4 Jan	17:30	Chile	3–0	Uruguay	25–22	25–20	25–19			75–61	P2
4 Jan	20:15	Venezuela	3–0	Paraguay	25–9	25–19	25–13			75–41	P2
5 Jan	17:31	Venezuela	3–0	Chile	25–16	25–20	25–21			75–57	P2
5 Jan	20:17	Argentina	3–0	Paraguay	25–16	25–19	25–18			75–53	P2
6 Jan	17:30	Venezuela	3–0	Uruguay	25–17	25–16	25–18			75–51	P2
6 Jan	20:20	Argentina	3–0	Chile	25–14	25–14	25–18			75–46	P2
7 Jan	17:00	Paraguay	3–1	Uruguay	23–25	25–20	25–23	25–16		98–84	P2
7 Jan	20:01	Argentina	1–3	Venezuela	25–22	23–25	20–25	16–25		84–97	P2

== World qualification tournaments ==
Qualified teams

- Hosts
  - Germany
  - Portugal
  - Japan
- Qualified through the 2007 Asian Championship.
  - Australia *
  - South Korea *
  - Iran *
  - Thailand *
  - Indonesia
  - Chinese Taipei
- Qualified through the Continental Olympic Qualification Tournament or the FIVB World Ranking as of 3 December 2007.
  - Algeria (as African Olympic Qualification Tournament 2nd place)
  - Poland (as World Ranking for European Team 1st place)
  - Spain (as World Ranking for European Team 2nd place)
  - Italy (as World Ranking for European Team 3rd place)
  - Puerto Rico (as North American Olympic Qualification Tournament 2nd place)
  - Cuba (as North American Olympic Qualification Tournament 3rd place)
  - Argentina (as South American Olympic Qualification Tournament 2nd place)

* The top four teams from 2007 Asian Championship were predetermined to be in 3rd tournament in Japan.

=== 1st tournament ===
- Venue: ISS Dome, Düsseldorf, Germany
- Dates: 23–25 May 2008
- All times are Central European Summer Time (UTC+02:00).
- The winners qualified for the 2008 Summer Olympics.

Pos	Team	Pld	W	L	Pts	SW	SL	SR	SPW	SPL	SPR	Qualification
1	Germany	3	3	0	6	9	4	2.250	295	259	1.139	2008 Summer Olympics
2	Cuba	3	2	1	5	8	4	2.000	271	238	1.139	
3	Spain	3	1	2	4	6	7	0.857	284	282	1.007	
4	Chinese Taipei	3	0	3	3	1	9	0.111	177	248	0.714	

Date	Time		Score		Set 1	Set 2	Set 3	Set 4	Set 5	Total	Report
23 May	17:00	Chinese Taipei	0–3	Germany	18–25	15–25	17–25			50–75	P2 P3
23 May	20:00	Spain	1–3	Cuba	18–25	25–18	20–25	17–25		80–93	P2 P3
24 May	17:00	Spain	3–1	Chinese Taipei	25–19	25–15	23–25	25–20		98–79	P2 P3
24 May	20:00	Cuba	2–3	Germany	26–24	25–21	21–25	18–25	13–15	103–110	P2 P3
25 May	12:00	Chinese Taipei	0–3	Cuba	14–25	18–25	16–25			48–75	P2 P3
25 May	15:00	Germany	3–2	Spain	25–23	25–23	23–25	22–25	15–10	110–106	P2 P3

=== 2nd tournament ===
- Venue: Nave Municipal de Espinho, Espinho, Portugal
- Dates: 30 May – 1 June 2008
- All times are Western European Summer Time (UTC+01:00).
- The winners qualified for the 2008 Summer Olympics.

Pos	Team	Pld	W	L	Pts	SW	SL	SR	SPW	SPL	SPR	Qualification
1	Poland	3	3	0	6	9	0	MAX	226	179	1.263	2008 Summer Olympics
2	Portugal	3	2	1	5	6	4	1.500	236	206	1.146	
3	Puerto Rico	3	1	2	4	4	6	0.667	199	236	0.843	
4	Indonesia	3	0	3	3	0	9	0.000	185	225	0.822	

Date	Time		Score		Set 1	Set 2	Set 3	Set 4	Set 5	Total	Report
30 May	19:00	Indonesia	0–3	Portugal	23–25	17–25	21–25			61–75	P2 P3
30 May	21:00	Poland	3–0	Puerto Rico	25–23	25–18	25–14			75–55	P2 P3
31 May	15:00	Indonesia	0–3	Poland	20–25	17–25	23–25			60–75	P2 P3
31 May	17:00	Portugal	3–1	Puerto Rico	25–15	22–25	25–11	25–18		97–69	P2 P3
1 Jun	15:00	Puerto Rico	3–0	Indonesia	25–21	25–21	25–22			75–64	P2 P3
1 Jun	17:00	Portugal	0–3	Poland	21–25	19–25	24–26			64–76	P2 P3

=== 3rd tournament ===
- Venue: Tokyo Metropolitan Gymnasium, Tokyo, Japan
- Dates: 31 May – 8 June 2008
- All times are Japan Standard Time (UTC+09:00).
- The winners and the best Asian team except the winners qualified for the 2008 Summer Olympics.

Pos	Team	Pld	W	L	Pts	SW	SL	SR	SPW	SPL	SPR	Qualification
1	Italy	7	7	0	14	21	4	5.250	615	483	1.273	2008 Summer Olympics
2	Japan	7	6	1	13	20	7	2.857	659	584	1.128	2008 Summer Olympics
3	South Korea	7	4	3	11	14	13	1.077	622	584	1.065	
4	Argentina	7	4	3	11	16	11	1.455	598	589	1.015	
5	Australia	7	3	4	10	11	13	0.846	522	526	0.992	
6	Iran	7	2	5	9	11	16	0.688	597	630	0.948	
7	Algeria	7	2	5	9	7	17	0.412	501	578	0.867	
8	Thailand	7	0	7	7	2	21	0.095	425	565	0.752	

Date	Time		Score		Set 1	Set 2	Set 3	Set 4	Set 5	Total	Report
31 May	11:05	Australia	3–0	Thailand	25–12	25–15	25–14			75–41	P2 P3
31 May	13:05	South Korea	1–3	Argentina	25–16	23–25	23–25	27–29		98–95	P2 P3
31 May	15:30	Algeria	3–2	Iran	35–37	18–25	25–21	27–25	19–17	124–125	P2 P3
31 May	18:32	Italy	3–2	Japan	25–20	28–30	28–30	35–33	15–7	131–120	P2 P3
1 Jun	11:05	Thailand	0–3	Algeria	23–25	21–25	15–25			59–75	P2 P3
1 Jun	13:05	Argentina	0–3	Australia	16–25	20–25	18–25			54–75	P2 P3
1 Jun	15:05	Italy	3–0	South Korea	25–18	25–17	25–21			75–56	P2 P3
1 Jun	18:00	Japan	3–1	Iran	25–19	25–17	23–25	25–22		98–83	P2 P3
3 Jun	11:35	Algeria	0–3	Argentina	18–25	24–26	22–25			64–76	P2 P3
3 Jun	13:35	Australia	0–3	Italy	17–25	9–25	16–25			42–75	P2 P3
3 Jun	15:35	Iran	3–1	Thailand	19–25	25–15	25–23	25–14		94–77	P2 P3
3 Jun	18:30	South Korea	1–3	Japan	21–25	25–21	23–25	19–25		88–96	P2 P3
4 Jun	11:35	Argentina	3–1	Iran	25–27	27–25	25–19	25–9		102–80	P2 P3
4 Jun	13:55	South Korea	3–2	Australia	27–29	25–21	21–25	25–20	15–10	113–105	P2 P3
4 Jun	16:30	Italy	3–0	Algeria	25–15	25–21	25–20			75–56	P2 P3
4 Jun	18:30	Japan	3–0	Thailand	25–23	25–14	25–16			75–53	P2 P3
6 Jun	11:35	Thailand	0–3	Argentina	15–25	20–25	16–25			51–75	P2 P3
6 Jun	13:35	Iran	0–3	Italy	16–25	20–25	18–25			54–75	P2 P3
6 Jun	15:35	Algeria	0–3	South Korea	9–25	19–25	17–25			45–75	P2 P3
6 Jun	18:30	Australia	0–3	Japan	22–25	26–28	27–29			75–82	P2 P3
7 Jun	11:05	South Korea	3–1	Iran	25–19	25–20	22–25	25–22		97–86	P2 P3
7 Jun	13:15	Australia	3–1	Algeria	25–22	25–19	18–25	25–20		93–86	P2 P3
7 Jun	15:25	Italy	3–0	Thailand	25–19	25–19	26–24			76–62	P2 P3
7 Jun	18:00	Japan	3–2	Argentina	26–28	25–13	25–19	17–25	20–18	113–103	P2 P3
8 Jun	11:05	Thailand	1–3	South Korea	18–25	25–20	18–25	21–25		82–95	P2 P3
8 Jun	13:15	Iran	3–0	Australia	25–18	25–16	25–23			75–57	P2 P3
8 Jun	15:05	Argentina	2–3	Italy	19–25	19–25	25–22	25–21	5–15	93–108	P2 P3
8 Jun	18:00	Algeria	0–3	Japan	20–25	13–25	18–25			51–75	P2 P3
