= Nikolai Grandkovsky =

Russian painter

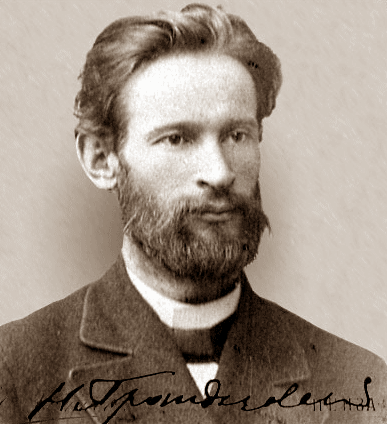
Nikolai Grandkovsky, (date unknown)

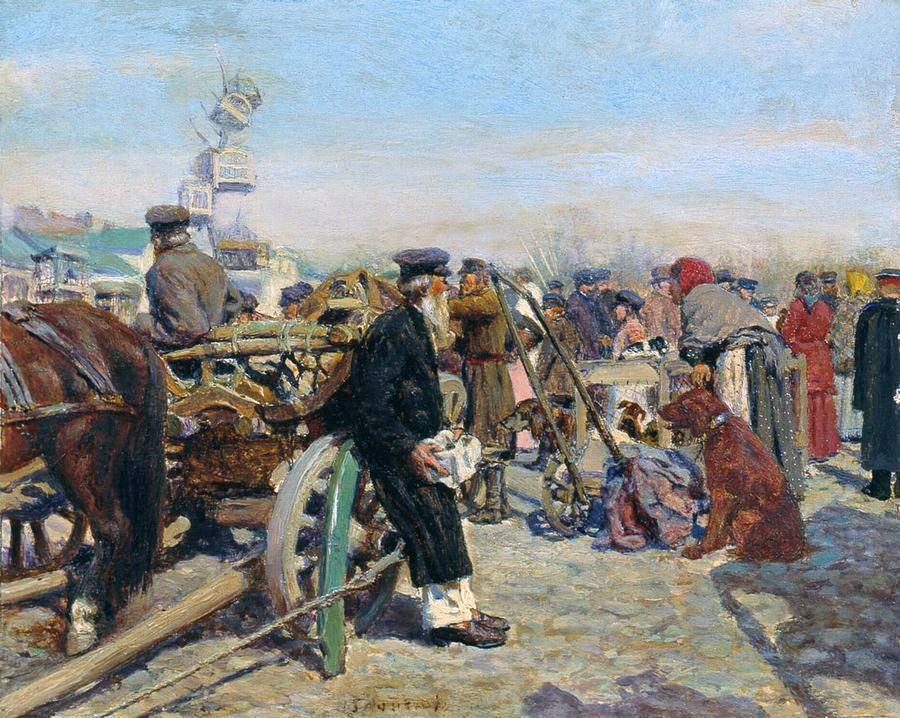
At the Bazaar

Nikolai Karlovich Grandkovsky (Russian: Николай Карлович Грандковский; 23 February 1864, Saratov - 18 May 1907, Penza) was a Russian Realist painter who specialized in portraits and genre scenes.

== Biography ==
He was born to Karl Mikhailovich Grandkovsky (1833-?), a college secretary, and his wife, Ekaterina Pavlovna Ilyina (1835-1873). After taking private lessons from Mikhail Ivanovich Dolivo-Dobrovolsky (1841-1881), and receiving his recommendation, Grandkovsky obtained a government grant and was enrolled at the Moscow School of Painting, Sculpture and Architecture in 1880. During his studies, his drawings received two silver medals from the Imperial Academy of Arts.

After graduating in 1889, he settled in Moscow. In 1891, he began to exhibit with the Peredvizhniki and, the following year, became a member of the "Moscow Society of Art Lovers". In 1894, he won an award for his portrait of Nikolai Zlatovratsky and, in 1895, another award for his painting "Купаться" (Bathing).

At the invitation of Konstantin Savitsky, he moved to Penza in 1897 to help him establish an art college at the new Penza Regional Art Gallery. He became one of the first professors there, together with the sculptor, Konstantin Klodt and the architect, Nikolai Zhukov. He also taught at the Penza Theological Seminary.

He died of typhus. Shortly after his death, the college held a major retrospective of his works.
