= Aleksey Ostapenko =

Russian volleyball player (born 1986)

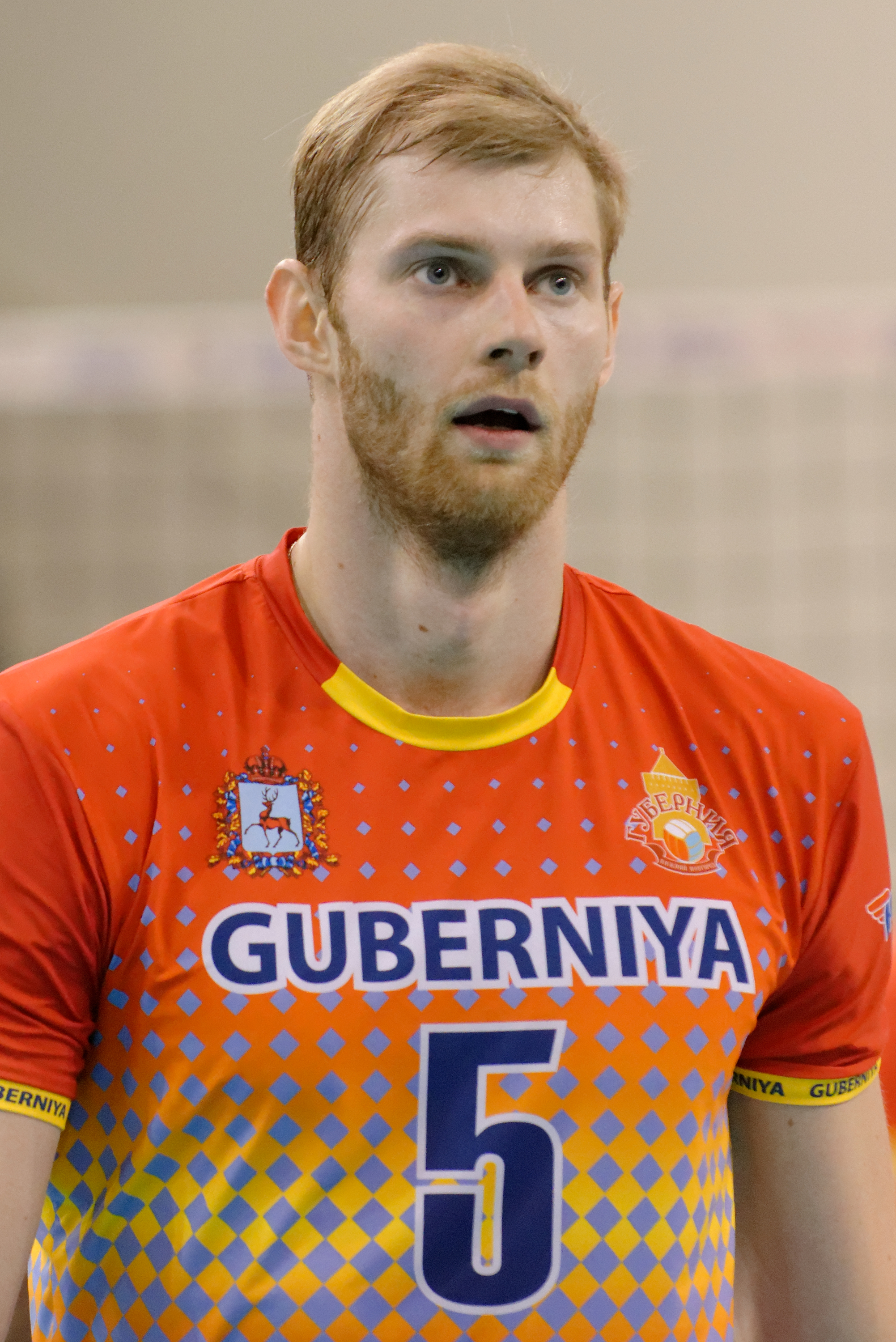
- Ostapenko in 2014

Personal information
- Full name: Aleksey Aleksandrovich Ostapenko
- Nationality: Russia
- Born: 26 May 1986 (age 40); Saratov, Russia
- Height: 2.06 m (6 ft 9 in)

Volleyball information
- Position: middle-blocker
- Current club: (Russia) Guberniya Nizhny Novgorod
- Number: 5
Medal record
Men's volleyball
Representing Russia
Olympic Games
Bronze medal – third place	2008 Beijing	Team competition

Aleksey Aleksandrovich Ostapenko (Russian: Алексей Александрович Остапенко, born 26 May 1986) is a volleyball player from Russia.

He was born in Saratov.

Ostapenko competed at the 2008 Summer Olympics, where Russia claimed the bronze medal.
