= Thomas W. Mossberg =

American physicist

- Born: Thomas William Mossberg; 1951 (age 73–74)
- Awards: 1993 Optical Society of America (Optica) Fellow; 1995 American Physical Society Fellow

Academic background
- Education: 1973 B.S., University of Chicago; 1978 Ph.D. Columbia University
- Thesis: Excited-state, tri-level, and two-photon echoes in atomic sodium vapor (1978)
- Doctoral advisor: Sven R. Hartmann

Thomas W. Mossberg (born 1951) is an American physicist, formerly of Columbia, Harvard, and the University of Oregon. He was also the founding President and CEO at LightSmyth Technologies, a nanotechnology company in Eugene, Oregon.

== Early life and education ==
The son of William and Rosemary (née Kotilinek) Mossberg, Thomas William Mossberg was born in 1951 in Hennepin, Minnesota. He completed his undergraduate work at the University of Chicago in 1973. He earned a Ph.D. at Columbia University 1978, with a dissertation titled, Excited-state, tri-level, and two-photon echoes in atomic sodium vapor, advised by Sven R. Hartmann.

== Career ==
After faculty positions at Columbia University and Harvard University, Mossberg joined the physics faculty at the University of Oregon from 1986–1999. Colleague Michael Raymer wrote, "Thomas Mossberg (Ph.D. Columbia Univ., 1978) in 1987 established a group to study experimental quantum optics. His group was first to demonstrate narrowing below the natural line width of an atomic emission line by the modification of the density of optical states within an optical cavity. In 1999 Mossberg went on to found successful optical technology companies in the Eugene area."

In 1996, the American Physical Society reported on "recent advances in spectral holographic optical data storage" of Mossberg's research, leading to "high capacity, high speed, optical RAM, and content-controlled optical switching devices". Mossberg's research between 1995–1997 was supported by NSF grants valued at $492,530.

At the urging of the University Technology Transfer Office, Mossberg started Templex Technology, Inc.:

In 1995, technologies developed by University of Oregon physicist Thomas Mossberg became the basis of a new company, Templex Technology, Inc. Since that time the company, which develops innovative, high-bandwidth optical communications, has grown to about thirteen employees. It recently re-located to the Riverfront Research Park adjacent to the UO. The new facility will allow Templex staffing to nearly double in the next year or two. On September 27, 1999, Templex announced that Intel Corporation has invested an undisclosed amount in the company. Templex intends to use the investment to further its product development, develop strategic partnerships, build company infrastructure, and create market awareness.

Mossberg's research produced hardware with record-breaking information density and speed:

Thomas Mossberg is developing a new kind of optical computer memory that far surpasses the capabilities of today's magnetic storage devices (e.g., hard drives). His experimental hardware handles vast amounts of digital information, storing it in a small crystal that can be accessed at lightning speeds. The hardware already holds a world's record for information density and access speed, storing the equivalent of 700 floppy disks of information in one square inch of memory material... A high-tech start-up company, Templex, has recently formed in Eugene to turn Mossberg's basic research into products for market. Only a year old, Templex already employs four Ph.D. physicists and additional staff members.

Mossberg also founded LightSmyth Technologies, serving as its president and CEO from 2000 until his retirement in 2018. The firm had three NASA research awards between 2005–2007, at a total value of $769,744. LightSmyth Technologies produced high performance transmission gratings and other diffractive devices for the optical communications industry. In 2014, LightSmyth Technologies was acquired by Finisar Corporation which was in turn acquired by II-VI Corporation.

== Selected publications ==
- Mossberg, Thomas W. (February 1, 1982). "Time-domain frequency-selective optical data storage". Optics Letters. 7 (2): 77–79. Bibcode:1982OptL....7...77M. doi:10.1364/OL.7.000077. ISSN 1539-4794. PMID 19710829.
- Lewenstein, M.; Mossberg, T. W.; Glauber, and R. J. (August 17, 1987). "Dynamical suppression of spontaneous emission". Physical Review Letters. 59 (7): 775–778. Bibcode:1987PhRvL..59..775L. doi:10.1103/PhysRevLett.59.775. PMID 10035868.
- Agarwal, G. S.; Zhu, Yifu; Gauthier, Daniel J.; Mossberg, T. W. (May 1, 1991). "Spectrum of radiation from two-level atoms under intense bichromatic excitation". JOSA B. 8 (5): 1163–1167. Bibcode:1991JOSAB...8.1163A. doi:10.1364/JOSAB.8.001163. ISSN 1520-8540.
- Lewenstein, Maciej; Zakrzewski, Jakub; Mossberg, Thomas W. (July 1, 1988). "Spontaneous emission of atoms coupled to frequency-dependent reservoirs". Physical Review A. 38 (2): 808–819. Bibcode:1988PhRvA..38..808L. doi:10.1103/PhysRevA.38.808. PMID 9900445.
- Zakrzewski, Jakub; Lewenstein, Maciej; Mossberg, Thomas W. (January 12, 1991). "Theory of dressed-state lasers. I. Effective Hamiltonians and stability properties". Physical Review A. 44 (11): 7717–7731. Bibcode:1991PhRvA..44.7717Z. doi:10.1103/PhysRevA.44.7717. PMID 9905909.
- Castro, Jose M.; Geraghty, David F.; Honkanen, Seppo; Greiner, Christoph M.; Iazikov, Dmitri; Mossberg, Thomas W. (May 30, 2005). "Demonstration of mode conversion using anti-symmetric waveguide Bragg gratings". Optics Express. 13 (11): 4180–4184. Bibcode:2005OExpr..13.4180C. doi:10.1364/OPEX.13.004180. ISSN 1094-4087. PMID 19495331.

== Selected patents ==
- Time domain data storage, (1984).
- Amplitude and phase control in distributed optical structures, (2004).
- Temperature-compensated planar waveguide optical apparatus, (2006).
- Multimode planar waveguide spectral filter, (2006).
- Optical waveform recognition and/or generation and optical switching, (2006).
- Multiple distributed optical structures in a single optical element, (2006).
- Multiple-wavelength optical source, (2006).
- Near to eye display system and appliance, (2010, application abandoned).

== Awards and honors ==
- Mossberg was elected an Optical Society of America Fellow in 1993.
- In 1995, Mossberg was elected a Fellow of the American Physical Society, cited For his work on optical resonance and cavity quantum electrodynamics, including the imaginative use of dressed-atom effects to control atomic dynamics and create new mechanisms for optical gain.
