= Maxim Velikov =

Russian ice hockey player

- Born: 14 January 1982 (age 44) Saratov, Russia
- Height: 5 ft 10 in (178 cm)
- Weight: 196 lb (89 kg; 14 st 0 lb)
- Position: Defence
- Shot: Left
- Played for: UHC Dynamo; Atlant Moscow Oblast; HC MVD; Kristall Saratov; HC CSKA Moscow; Amur Khabarovsk
- NHL draft: Undrafted
- Playing career: 2000–2015

Maxim Velikov (born January 14, 1982) is a Russian professional ice hockey defenceman who currently plays with Amur Khabarovsk in the Kontinental Hockey League.

== Career statistics ==
			Regular season					Playoffs
Season	Team	League	GP	G	A	Pts	PIM	GP	G	A	Pts	PIM
1999–00	HC CSKA Moscow	Russia	5	0	0	0	0	2	0	0	0	0
1999–00	HC CSKA Moscow-2	Russia3	20	4	14	18	38	—	—	—	—	—
2000–01	HC CSKA Moscow	Russia	15	0	0	0	2	—	—	—	—	—
2000–01	HC CSKA Moscow-2	Russia3	28	6	8	14	36	—	—	—	—	—
2001–02	HC CSKA Moscow	Russia	23	3	1	4	4	—	—	—	—	—
2001–02	HC CSKA Moscow-2	Russia3	12	2	5	7	16	—	—	—	—	—
2002–03	HC CSKA Moscow	Russia	7	0	0	0	0	—	—	—	—	—
2002–03	HC CSKA Moscow-2	Russia3	15	2	4	6	16	—	—	—	—	—
2002–03	Khimik Voskresensk	Russia2	13	0	0	0	6	14	0	0	0	4
2002–03	Khimik Voskresensk-2	Russia3	4	0	2	2	4	—	—	—	—	—
2003–04	Kristall Saratov	Russia2	60	7	4	11	36	4	0	1	1	4
2004–05	Kristall Saratov	Russia2	18	5	4	9	24	—	—	—	—	—
2004–05	HC MVD	Russia2	33	2	8	10	12	13	0	2	2	4
2005–06	HC MVD	Russia	40	0	3	3	38	4	0	0	0	4
2005–06	HK MVD-THK Tver	Russia3	3	2	1	3	4	—	—	—	—	—
2006–07	HC MVD	Russia	49	2	9	11	70	3	0	0	0	2
2007–08	HC MVD	Russia	56	4	12	16	62	3	0	0	0	10
2008–09	HC MVD	KHL	50	4	13	17	52	—	—	—	—	—
2009–10	HC MVD	KHL	42	2	6	8	26	22	2	5	7	18
2010–11	HC Dynamo Moscow	KHL	25	3	2	5	28	4	1	0	1	0
2011–12	HC Dynamo Moscow	KHL	17	0	2	2	14	—	—	—	—	—
2012–13	HC Dynamo Moscow	KHL	4	0	0	0	4	—	—	—	—	—
2012–13	Dynamo Balashikha	VHL	5	0	3	3	6	—	—	—	—	—
2013–14	Atlant Mytishchi	KHL	47	4	5	9	18	—	—	—	—	—
2014–15	Atlant Mytishchi	KHL	1	0	0	0	2	—	—	—	—	—
2014–15	Dizel Penza	VHL	11	0	3	3	8	—	—	—	—	—
2014–15	Amur Khabarovsk	KHL	23	0	2	2	14	—	—	—	—	—
KHL totals			209	13	30	43	158	26	3	5	8	18
Russia totals			195	9	25	34	176	12	0	0	0	16
Russia2 totals			124	14	16	30	78	31	0	3	3	12
