= 2020–21 Ukrainian Men's Volleyball Super League =

2020–21 SuperLeague
- League: Ukrainian Super League
- Sport: Men's volleyball
- Duration: 9 October 2020 – April 2021
- Number of teams: 10

Regular season
- Top seed: Barkom-Kazhany
- Top scorer: (Albania) Anton Qafarena

Finals

Ukrainian Volleyball League seasons
- ← 2019–20 2021–22 →

The 2020–21 Ukrainian Men's Volleyball Super League was the 2020–21 edition of the Ukrainian top-tier volleyball championship. Barkom-Kazhany was the defending champion.

This season was the first for Epicentr-Podoliany.

== Teams ==
Location of teams in 2020–21 Volleyball Super League

Team	City	Arena
Barkom-Kazhany	Lviv	
Burevisnyk	Chernihiv	National Pedagogical University
Sertse Podillia	Vinnytsya	
MHP-Vinnytsia	Trostianets (Vinnytsia Oblast)	
VSC MHP-Vinnytsia	Trostianets (Vinnytsia Oblast)	
Zhytychi Zhytomyr	Zhytomyr	
Lokomotyv Kharkiv	Kharkiv	Sports Palace "Lokomotyv"
Yurydychna Akademiya	Kharkiv	
Epicentr-Podoliany	Horodok (Khmelnytskyi Oblast)	
Pokuttia-Sniatyn-Prybyliv	Sniatyn	

== Play-offs ==
Quarterfinals					Semifinals			Finals
					Barkom-Kazhany	3	3
1	MHP-Vinnytsia	1	1	X	Zhytychi Zhytomyr	0	0
8	Yurydychna Akademiya	3	3	X
4	Zhytychi Zhytomyr	3	3	X
5	Prybyliv	0	0	X	Epicentr-Podoliany	3	3
					Yurydychna Akademiya	0	1

=== Quarter-finals ===
Date	Time		Score		Set 1	Set 2	Set 3	Set 4	Set 5	Total	Report
20 Feb	16:00	Yurydychna Akademiya	3–1	MHP-Vinnytsia	25–18	22–25	25–22	30–28		102–93	Report
20 Feb	12:00	Prybyliv	0–3	Zhytychi Zhytomyr	15–25	18–25	18–25			51–75	Report

Date	Time		Score		Set 1	Set 2	Set 3	Set 4	Set 5	Total	Report
6 Mar	16:00	MHP-Vinnytsia	1–3	Yurydychna Akademiya	30–32	21–25	25–17	23–25		99–99	Report
3 Mar	16:00	Zhytychi Zhytomyr	3–0	Prybyliv	25–17	25–15	27–25	25–10		102–67	Report

=== Semi-finals ===
Date	Time		Score		Set 1	Set 2	Set 3	Set 4	Set 5	Total	Report
26 Mar	17:00	Epicentr-Podoliany	3–0	Yurydychna Akademiya	25–23	28–26	30–28			83–77	Report
26 Mar	18:00	Barkom-Kazhany	3–0	Zhytychi Zhytomyr	26–24	25–18	25–21			76–63	Report

Date	Time		Score		Set 1	Set 2	Set 3	Set 4	Set 5	Total	Report
27 Mar	12:00	Epicentr-Podoliany	3–1	Yurydychna Akademiya	25–13	25–14	19–25	25–16		94–68	Report
27 Mar	12:00	Barkom-Kazhany	3–0	Zhytychi Zhytomyr	25–18	25–23	25–16			75–57	Report

Date	Time		Score		Set 1	Set 2	Set 3	Set 4	Set 5	Total	Report
1 Apr	16:00	Yurydychna Akademiya	–	Epicentr-Podoliany	–	–	–	–		0–0	Report
1 Apr	18:00	Zhytychi Zhytomyr	–	Barkom-Kazhany	–	–	–	–		0–0	Report

Date	Time		Score		Set 1	Set 2	Set 3	Set 4	Set 5	Total	Report
2 Apr	12:00	Yurydychna Akademiya	–	Epicentr-Podoliany	–	–	–	–		0–0	Report
2 Apr	12:00	Zhytychi Zhytomyr	–	Barkom-Kazhany	–	–	–	–		0–0	Report

== Ukrainian clubs in European competitions ==
Team	Competition	Progress
Barkom-Kazhany	CEV Challenge Cup	Round of 16
Epicentr-Podoliany	CEV Challenge Cup	Round of 8
