= Yurii Tomyn =

Ukrainian volleyball player (born 1988)

Personal information
- Nationality: Ukrainian
- Born: December 23, 1988 (age 37) Kolomyia, Ukraine
- Height: 6 ft 6 in (1.98 m)
- Weight: 194 lb (88 kg)
- Spike: 120 in (305 cm)
- Block: 128 in (325 cm)

Volleyball information
- Position: Οutside Hitter
- Current club: (Ukraine) Epicentr-Podoliany

Career
- Years: Team
- 2010–2016 2016–2017 2017–2018 2018–2020 2020–present: (Ukraine) Lokomotyv Kharkiv (Ukraine) Novator Khmelnytskyi (Ukraine) Lokomotyv Kharkiv (Ukraine) Barkom-Kazhany (Ukraine) Epicentr-Podoliany

National team
- Years: Team
- –: Ukraine
Medal record
European Volleyball League
| Gold medal – first place | 2017 Denmark |

Yurii Tomyn (Ukrainian: Юрій Томин, born December 23, 1988) is a Ukrainian volleyball player, a member of the Ukraine men's national volleyball team and Epicentr-Podoliany.

== Career ==
Yurii Tomyn started his professional career in Lokomotyv Kharkiv.

He was a member of the Ukraine men's national volleyball team in 2019 Men's European Volleyball Championship.

== Sporting achievements ==
=== Clubs ===
Ukrainian Championship:

- x7 2010/11, 2011/12, 2012/13, 2013/14, 2014/15, 2015/16, 2018/19

Ukrainian Cup:

- x7 2010/11, 2011/12, 2012/13, 2013/14, 2014/15, 2015/16, 2018/19

Ukrainian Supercup:

- x3 2017/18, 2018/2019, 2019/2020

=== National team ===
- 2017 European League

=== Individual ===
- 2019/2020 MVP (Ukraine) Ukrainian Supercup
- 2018/2019 Best Opposite (Ukraine) Ukrainian Cup
