= Andriy Levchenko =

Ukrainian volleyball player (born 1985)

Personal information
- Nationality: Ukrainian
- Born: 1 January 1985 (age 41); Kharkiv
- Hometown: Kharkiv
- Height: 6 ft 8 in (2.04 m)
- Weight: 214 lb (97 kg)
- Spike: 140 in (350 cm)
- Block: 130 in (320 cm)

Volleyball information
- Position: Middle blocker
- Current club: (Finland) VaLePa Sastamala
- Number: 9

Career
Years	Teams
2004-2008; 2008-2009; 2009-2011; 2011-2012; 2012-2014; 2014-2015; 2015-2016	(Ukraine) Lokomotyv Kharkiv (Latvia) ASK/Kuldiga (Ukraine) Lokomotyv Kharkiv (France) Arago de Sète (Belarus) Shakhtyor Soligorsk (Kazakhstan) TNK Kazchrome (Finland) VaLePa Sastamala

National team
Ukraine
Medal record
Summer Universiade
Silver medal – second place	2011 Shenzhen
European League
Gold medal – first place	2017 Denmark

Andriy Levchenko (born 1 January 1985) is a Ukrainian former volleyball player, a member of the Ukraine men's national volleyball team and Finnish club VaLePa Sastamala, a gold medalist of the 2017 European League.

After the end of the 2015/2016 season, he decided to end his volleyball career.

== Sporting achievements ==
=== Clubs ===
Ukrainian Cup:

- 2004, 2006, 2007, 2009, 2010

Ukrainian Championship:

- 2005, 2007, 2010, 2011
- 2008

Latvian Championship:

- 2009

French Championship:

- 2012

Belarusian Championship:

- 2013, 2014

Finnish Championship:

- 2016

=== National team ===
Summer Universiade:

- 2011

European League:

- 2017
