= 2021–22 CEV Challenge Cup =

- League: CEV Challenge Cup
- Sport: Volleyball
- Duration: 10 November 2021 – 22 March 2022

Finals
- Champions: (France) Narbonne Volley
- Finals MVP: (Argentina) Nicolás Uriarte

CEV Challenge Cup seasons
- ← 2020–21 2022–23 →

The 2021–22 CEV Challenge Cup was the 42nd edition of the third most important European volleyball club competition organised by the European Volleyball Confederation.

== Participating teams ==
Drawing of Lots took place on 25 June 2021 in Luxembourg City.

Rank	Country	Number of teams	Teams
1	Turkey	1	Halkbank Ankara
4	France	1	Narbonne Volley
6	Belgium	1	Tectum Achel
7	Switzerland	2	Volley Schönenwerd, Lausanne UC
8	Romania	1	CSA Steaua București
9	Portugal	2	AJ Fonte Bastardo Azores, Sporting CP
11	Austria	3	Union Raiffeisen Waldviertel, VCA Amstetten NÖ, UVC Weberzeile Ried im Innkreis
12	Greece	2	Panathinaikos AC Athens, PAOK Thessaloniki
13	Bulgaria	2	Levski Sofia, Marek Union-Ivkoni Dupnitsa
16	Belarus	1	Stroitel Minsk
17	Hungary	2	VRCK Kazincbarcika, Pénzügyőr SE Budapest
18	Bosnia and Herzegovina	1	Bosna Sarajevo
20	Croatia	1	MOK Mursa Osijek
22	Ukraine	3	Barkom-Kazhany Lviv, Epicentr-Podolyany Horodok, Yurydychna Akademiya Kharkiv
23	Estonia	2	TalTech, Pärnu VK
24	Israel	2	Hapoel Yoav Kfar Saba, Maccabi Yeadim Tel Aviv
25	Serbia	1	OK Niš
26	Slovenia	1	ACH Volley Ljubljana
27	Norway	1	Viking TIF Bergen
28	Cyprus	1	Omonia Nicosia
29	Spain	1	CAI Teruel
30	Kosovo	1	KV Pëja
31	Denmark	2	Gentofte Volley, Middelfart VK
32	Slovakia	2	TJ Spartak Myjava, VKP Bratislava
33	Luxembourg	1	VC Lorentzweiler

== Format ==
Qualification round (Home and away matches):

- 32nd Finals

Main phase (Home and away matches):

- 16th Finals → 8th Finals → 4th Finals

Final phase (Home and away matches):

- Semifinals → Finals

Aggregate score is counted as follows: 3 points for 3–0 or 3–1 win, 2 points for 3–2 win, 1 point for 2–3 loss.
In case the teams are tied after two legs, a Golden Set is played immediately at the completion of the second leg.

== Qualification round ==
=== 32nd Finals ===
Team 1	Agg.	Team 2	1st leg	2nd leg
Yurydychna Akademiya Kharkiv (Ukraine)	2–4	(Austria) VCA Amstetten NÖ	1–3	3–2
Middelfart VK (Denmark)	0–6	(Greece) PAOK Thessaloniki	0–3	0–3
Halkbank Ankara (Turkey)	6–0	(Bulgaria) Marek Union-Ivkoni Dupnitsa	3–0	3–0
UVC Weberzeile Ried im Innkreis (Austria)	4–2	(Hungary) VRCK Kazincbarcika	3–0	2–3
VKP Bratislava (Slovakia)	0–6	(Ukraine) Epicentr-Podolyany Horodok	W.O.	W.O.
Maccabi Yeadim Tel Aviv (Israel)	5–1	(Estonia) Pärnu VK	3–0	3–2

==== First leg ====
Date	Time		Score		Set 1	Set 2	Set 3	Set 4	Set 5	Total	Report
10 Nov	18:00	Yurydychna Akademiya Kharkiv (Ukraine)	1–3	(Austria) VCA Amstetten NÖ	22–25	33–31	23–25	20–25		98–106	Report
10 Nov	19:30	Middelfart VK (Denmark)	0–3	(Greece) PAOK Thessaloniki	22–25	19–25	16–25			57–75	Report
17 Nov	17:30	Halkbank Ankara (Turkey)	3–0	(Bulgaria) Marek Union-Ivkoni Dupnitsa	25–17	25–15	25–11			75–43	Report
10 Nov	19:00	UVC Weberzeile Ried im Innkreis (Austria)	3–0	(Hungary) VRCK Kazincbarcika	25–22	25–18	25–12			75–52	Report
18 Nov	19:00	Maccabi Yeadim Tel Aviv (Israel)	3–0	(Estonia) Pärnu VK	25–15	25–15	25–22			75–52	Report

==== Second leg ====
Date	Time		Score		Set 1	Set 2	Set 3	Set 4	Set 5	Total	Report
17 Nov	19:00	VCA Amstetten NÖ (Austria)	2–3	(Ukraine) Yurydychna Akademiya Kharkiv	23–25	25–18	25–20	20–25	11–15	104–103	Report
17 Nov	18:00	PAOK Thessaloniki (Greece)	3–0	(Denmark) Middelfart VK	25–16	25–23	25–21			75–60	Report
18 Nov	15:00	Marek Union-Ivkoni Dupnitsa (Bulgaria)	0–3	(Turkey) Halkbank Ankara	16–25	10–25	13–25			39–75	Report
18 Nov	19:00	VRCK Kazincbarcika (Hungary)	3–2	(Austria) UVC Weberzeile Ried im Innkreis	23–25	26–24	25–20	22–25	15–11	111–105	Report
19 Nov	19:00	Pärnu VK (Estonia)	2–3	(Israel) Maccabi Yeadim Tel Aviv	15–25	15–25	25–20	25–20	10–15	90–105	Report

== Main phase ==
=== 16th Finals ===
Team 1	Agg.	Team 2	1st leg	2nd leg	Golden Set
Halkbank Ankara (Turkey)	6–0	(Bosnia and Herzegovina) Bosna Sarajevo	3–0	3–0	
Viking TIF Bergen (Norway)	1–5	(Austria) Union Raiffeisen Waldviertel	1–3	2–3	
TalTech (Estonia)	4–2	(Denmark) Gentofte Volley	3–0	2–3	
UVC Weberzeile Ried im Innkreis (Austria)	1–5	(Switzerland) Volley Schönenwerd	0–3	2–3	
Epicentr-Podolyany Horodok (Ukraine)	6–0	(Hungary) Pénzügyőr SE Budapest	3–1	3–1	
Maccabi Yeadim Tel Aviv (Israel)	1–5	(Greece) Panathinaikos AC Athens	2–3	1–3	
TJ Spartak Myjava (Slovakia)	3–2	(Israel) Hapoel Yoav Kfar Saba	3–2	Cancelled	
CAI Teruel (Spain)	5–1	(Belgium) Tectum Achel	3–1	3–2	
PAOK Thessaloniki (Greece)	6–0	(Croatia) MOK Mursa Osijek	3–0	3–0	
KV Pëja (Kosovo)	0–6	(Portugal) AJ Fonte Bastardo Azores	0–3	0–3	
ACH Volley Ljubljana (Slovenia)	6–0	(Ukraine) Barkom-Kazhany Lviv	3–0	3–1	
VC Lorentzweiler (Luxembourg)	0–6	(Romania) CSA Steaua București	0–3	0–3	
Lausanne UC (Switzerland)	4–2	(Belarus) Stroitel Minsk	3–2	3–2	
VCA Amstetten NÖ (Austria)	3–3	(Bulgaria) Levski Sofia	0–3	3–1	16–14
Sporting CP (Portugal)	6–0	(Serbia) OK Niš	3–1	3–1	
Omonia Nicosia (Cyprus)	1–5	(France) Narbonne Volley	0–3	2–3	

==== First leg ====
Date	Time		Score		Set 1	Set 2	Set 3	Set 4	Set 5	Total	Report
8 Dec	14:00	Halkbank Ankara (Turkey)	3–0	(Bosnia and Herzegovina) Bosna Sarajevo	25–16	25–15	25–17			75–48	Report
7 Dec	19:00	Viking TIF Bergen (Norway)	1–3	(Austria) Union Raiffeisen Waldviertel	9–25	14–25	25–23	22–25		70–98	Report
30 Nov	19:00	TalTech (Estonia)	3–0	(Denmark) Gentofte Volley	25–18	25–19	25–20			75–57	Report
30 Nov	19:00	UVC Weberzeile Ried im Innkreis (Austria)	0–3	(Switzerland) Volley Schönenwerd	22–25	24–26	17–25			63–76	Report
7 Dec	18:00	Epicentr-Podolyany Horodok (Ukraine)	3–1	(Hungary) Pénzügyőr SE Budapest	22–25	25–9	25–20	25–17		97–71	Report
30 Nov	20:40	Maccabi Yeadim Tel Aviv (Israel)	2–3	(Greece) Panathinaikos AC Athens	13–25	25–19	18–25	25–18	11–15	92–102	Report
21 Dec	17:30	TJ Spartak Myjava (Slovakia)	3–2	(Israel) Hapoel Yoav Kfar Saba	19–25	19–25	25–19	25–18	15–12	103–99	Report
1 Dec	20:00	CAI Teruel (Spain)	3–1	(Belgium) Tectum Achel	23–25	25–21	25–17	25–21		98–84	Report
1 Dec	19:00	PAOK Thessaloniki (Greece)	3–0	(Croatia) MOK Mursa Osijek	25–20	25–18	25–23			75–61	Report
1 Dec	18:00	KV Pëja (Kosovo)	0–3	(Portugal) AJ Fonte Bastardo Azores	20–25	15–25	14–25			49–75	Report
1 Dec	18:00	ACH Volley Ljubljana (Slovenia)	3–0	(Ukraine) Barkom-Kazhany Lviv	25–14	25–17	25–13			75–44	Report
2 Dec	20:00	VC Lorentzweiler (Luxembourg)	0–3	(Romania) CSA Steaua București	16–25	16–25	17–25			49–75	Report
1 Dec	19:00	Lausanne UC (Switzerland)	3–2	(Belarus) Stroitel Minsk	12–25	25–23	23–25	26–24	15–10	101–107	Report
7 Dec	18:30	VCA Amstetten NÖ (Austria)	0–3	(Bulgaria) Levski Sofia	19–25	18–25	14–25			51–75	Report
30 Nov	20:00	Sporting CP (Portugal)	3–1	(Serbia) OK Niš	25–17	21–25	25–16	25–10		96–68	Report
30 Nov	20:00	Omonia Nicosia (Cyprus)	0–3	(France) Narbonne Volley	22–25	19–25	22–25			63–75	Report

==== Second leg ====
Date	Time		Score		Set 1	Set 2	Set 3	Set 4	Set 5	Total	Report
9 Dec	17:00	Bosna Sarajevo (Bosnia and Herzegovina)	0–3	(Turkey) Halkbank Ankara	20–25	14–25	15–25			49–75	Report
8 Dec	17:00	Union Raiffeisen Waldviertel (Austria)	3–2	(Norway) Viking TIF Bergen	25–17	25–13	23–25	23–25	16–14	112–94	Report
1 Dec	19:00	Gentofte Volley (Denmark)	3–2	(Estonia) TalTech	32–30	19–25	25–22	19–25	17–15	112–117	Report
8 Dec	19:30	Volley Schönenwerd (Switzerland)	3–2	(Austria) UVC Weberzeile Ried im Innkreis	24–26	25–19	21–25	26–24	15–12	111–106	Report
8 Dec	18:00	Pénzügyőr SE Budapest (Hungary)	1–3	(Ukraine) Epicentr-Podolyany Horodok	23–25	25–20	25–27	23–25		96–97	Report
8 Dec	20:00	Panathinaikos AC Athens (Greece)	3–1	(Israel) Maccabi Yeadim Tel Aviv	25–20	21–25	25–16	31–29		102–90	Report
9 Dec	20:30	Tectum Achel (Belgium)	2–3	(Spain) CAI Teruel	20–25	17–25	25–12	25–23	11–15	98–100	Report
8 Dec	19:00	MOK Mursa Osijek (Croatia)	0–3	(Greece) PAOK Thessaloniki	13–25	25–27	19–25			57–77	Report
8 Dec	17:00	AJ Fonte Bastardo Azores (Portugal)	3–0	(Kosovo) KV Pëja	25–14	25–14	25–13			75–41	Report
8 Dec	19:00	Barkom-Kazhany Lviv (Ukraine)	1–3	(Slovenia) ACH Volley Ljubljana	25–20	27–29	17–25	19–25		88–99	Report
8 Dec	18:00	CSA Steaua București (Romania)	3–0	(Luxembourg) VC Lorentzweiler	25–23	25–15	25–13			75–51	Report
7 Dec	19:00	Stroitel Minsk (Belarus)	2–3	(Switzerland) Lausanne UC	25–14	25–22	29–31	19–25	13–15	111–107	Report
8 Dec	18:30	Levski Sofia (Bulgaria)	1–3	(Austria) VCA Amstetten NÖ	19–25	25–19	23–25	19–25		86–94	Report
Golden set		Levski Sofia (Bulgaria)	14–16	(Austria) VCA Amstetten NÖ							
8 Dec	18:00	OK Niš (Serbia)	1–3	(Portugal) Sporting CP	15–25	19–25	25–16	22–25		81–91	Report
7 Dec	20:00	Narbonne Volley (France)	3–2	(Cyprus) Omonia Nicosia	25–11	25–20	21–25	23–25	15–12	109–93	Report

=== 8th Finals ===
Team 1	Agg.	Team 2	1st leg	2nd leg	Golden Set
Halkbank Ankara (Turkey)	6–0	(Austria) Union Raiffeisen Waldviertel	W.O.	W.O.	
TalTech (Estonia)	3–3	(Switzerland) Volley Schönenwerd	3–1	1–3	15–13
Epicentr-Podolyany Horodok (Ukraine)	1–5	(Greece) Panathinaikos AC Athens	1–3	2–3	
TJ Spartak Myjava (Slovakia)	3–3	(Spain) CAI Teruel	3–1	1–3	9–15
PAOK Thessaloniki (Greece)	0–6	(Portugal) AJ Fonte Bastardo Azores	1–3	1–3	
ACH Volley Ljubljana (Slovenia)	6–0	(Romania) CSA Steaua București	3–1	3–0	
Lausanne UC (Switzerland)	5–1	(Austria) VCA Amstetten NÖ	3–2	3–0	
Sporting CP (Portugal)	3–3	(France) Narbonne Volley	1–3	3–1	15–17

==== First leg ====
Date	Time		Score		Set 1	Set 2	Set 3	Set 4	Set 5	Total	Report
11 Jan	20:00	TalTech (Estonia)	3–1	(Switzerland) Volley Schönenwerd	22–25	25–21	25–17	25–17		97–80	Report
12 Jan	18:00	Epicentr-Podolyany Horodok (Ukraine)	1–3	(Greece) Panathinaikos AC Athens	24–26	23–25	25–20	22–25		94–96	Report
12 Jan	18:00	TJ Spartak Myjava (Slovakia)	3–1	(Spain) CAI Teruel	20–25	25–20	25–19	25–18		95–82	Report
11 Jan	17:00	PAOK Thessaloniki (Greece)	1–3	(Portugal) AJ Fonte Bastardo Azores	23–25	26–24	23–25	25–27		97–101	Report
12 Jan	18:00	ACH Volley Ljubljana (Slovenia)	3–1	(Romania) CSA Steaua București	26–24	21–25	25–19	25–12		97–80	Report
12 Jan	19:00	Lausanne UC (Switzerland)	3–2	(Austria) VCA Amstetten NÖ	25–21	23–25	25–21	21–25	15–10	109–102	Report
12 Jan	19:30	Sporting CP (Portugal)	1–3	(France) Narbonne Volley	20–25	25–17	22–25	31–33		98–100	Report

==== Second leg ====
Date	Time		Score		Set 1	Set 2	Set 3	Set 4	Set 5	Total	Report
12 Jan	20:00	Volley Schönenwerd (Switzerland)	3–1	(Estonia) TalTech	27–25	34–36	25–23	25–15		111–99	Report
Golden set		Volley Schönenwerd (Switzerland)	13–15	(Estonia) TalTech							
18 Jan	20:00	Panathinaikos AC Athens (Greece)	3–2	(Ukraine) Epicentr-Podolyany Horodok	25–17	25–22	23–25	19–25	17–15	109–104	Report
19 Jan	20:00	CAI Teruel (Spain)	3–1	(Slovakia) TJ Spartak Myjava	25–19	22–25	25–20	25–20		97–84	Report
Golden set		CAI Teruel (Spain)	15–9	(Slovakia) TJ Spartak Myjava							
19 Jan	20:30	AJ Fonte Bastardo Azores (Portugal)	3–1	(Greece) PAOK Thessaloniki	22–25	25–15	25–18	25–19		97–77	Report
19 Jan	18:00	CSA Steaua București (Romania)	0–3	(Slovenia) ACH Volley Ljubljana	21–25	17–25	15–25			53–75	Report
19 Jan	20:20	VCA Amstetten NÖ (Austria)	0–3	(Switzerland) Lausanne UC	16–25	25–27	23–25			64–77	Report
20 Jan	19:30	Narbonne Volley (France)	1–3	(Portugal) Sporting CP	25–22	24–26	20–25	24–26		93–99	Report
Golden set		Narbonne Volley (France)	17–15	(Portugal) Sporting CP							

=== 4th Finals ===
Team 1	Agg.	Team 2	1st leg	2nd leg	Golden Set
Halkbank Ankara (Turkey)	6–0	(Estonia) TalTech	3–0	3–0	
Panathinaikos AC Athens (Greece)	3–3	(Spain) CAI Teruel	3–1	0–3	15–11
AJ Fonte Bastardo Azores (Portugal)	1–5	(Slovenia) ACH Volley Ljubljana	2–3	1–3	
Lausanne UC (Switzerland)	0–6	(France) Narbonne Volley	1–3	1–3	

==== First leg ====
Date	Time		Score		Set 1	Set 2	Set 3	Set 4	Set 5	Total	Report
2 Feb	17:30	Halkbank Ankara (Turkey)	3–0	(Estonia) TalTech	25–20	25–18	25–17			75–55	Report
2 Feb	17:00	Panathinaikos (Greece)	3–1	(Spain) CAI Teruel	29–31	25–19	25–13	25–18		104–81	Report
2 Feb	20:30	AJ Fonte Bastardo Azores (Portugal)	2–3	(Slovenia) ACH Volley Ljubljana	25–23	19–25	26–24	21–25	6–15	97–112	Report
3 Feb	19:00	Lausanne UC (Switzerland)	1–3	(France) Narbonne Volley	25–22	21–25	22–25	15–25		83–97	Report

==== Second leg ====
Date	Time		Score		Set 1	Set 2	Set 3	Set 4	Set 5	Total	Report
3 Feb	15:00	TalTech (Estonia)	0–3	(Turkey) Halkbank Ankara	15–25	23–25	21–25			59–75	Report
9 Feb	20:00	CAI Teruel (Spain)	3–0	(Greece) Panathinaikos	25–21	25–21	25–20			75–62	Report
Golden set		CAI Teruel (Spain)	11–15	(Greece) Panathinaikos							
9 Feb	18:00	ACH Volley Ljubljana (Slovenia)	3–1	(Portugal) AJ Fonte Bastardo Azores	25–9	27–29	25–22	25–21		102–81	Report
9 Feb	19:30	Narbonne Volley (France)	3–1	(Switzerland) Lausanne UC	25–22	23–25	25–19	25–18		98–84	Report

== Final phase ==
=== Semifinals ===
Team 1	Agg.	Team 2	1st leg	2nd leg	Golden Set
Halkbank Ankara (Turkey)	5–1	(Greece) Panathinaikos AC Athens	3–0	3–2	
ACH Volley Ljubljana (Slovenia)	3–3	(France) Narbonne Volley	2–3	3–2	9–15

==== First leg ====
Date	Time		Score		Set 1	Set 2	Set 3	Set 4	Set 5	Total	Report
23 Feb	17:30	Halkbank Ankara (Turkey)	3–0	(Greece) Panathinaikos AC Athens	25–22	25–20	25–21			75–63	Report
24 Feb	17:30	ACH Volley Ljubljana (Slovenia)	2–3	(France) Narbonne Volley	23–25	22–25	30–28	25–16	10–15	110–109	Report

==== Second leg ====
Date	Time		Score		Set 1	Set 2	Set 3	Set 4	Set 5	Total	Report
1 Mar	20:00	Panathinaikos AC Athens (Greece)	2–3	(Turkey) Halkbank Ankara	19–25	22–25	30–28	25–17	18–20	114–115	Report
1 Mar	19:00	Narbonne Volley (France)	2–3	(Slovenia) ACH Volley Ljubljana	25–17	25–17	28–30	18–25	13–15	109–104	Report
Golden set		Narbonne Volley (France)	15–9	(Slovenia) ACH Volley Ljubljana							

=== Finals ===
Team 1	Agg.	Team 2	1st leg	2nd leg	Golden Set
Halkbank Ankara (Turkey)	3–3	(France) Narbonne Volley	3–0	1–3	19–21

==== First leg ====
Date	Time		Score		Set 1	Set 2	Set 3	Set 4	Set 5	Total	Report
15 Mar	17:00	Halkbank Ankara (Turkey)	3–0	(France) Narbonne Volley	25–20	25–22	25–23			75–65	Report

==== Second leg ====
Date	Time		Score		Set 1	Set 2	Set 3	Set 4	Set 5	Total	Report
22 Mar	19:30	Narbonne Volley (France)	3–1	(Turkey) Halkbank Ankara	25–22	22–25	25–23	25–19		97–89	Report
Golden set		Narbonne Volley (France)	21–19	(Turkey) Halkbank Ankara							

== Final standings ==
Rank	Team
1st place, gold medalist(s)	(France) Narbonne Volley
2nd place, silver medalist(s)	(Turkey) Halkbank Ankara
Semifinalists	(Slovenia) ACH Volley Ljubljana (Greece) Panathinaikos AC Athens

2021–22 CEV Challenge Cup winners
(France)
Narbonne Volley
1st title
