= Horden Brova =

Ukrainian volleyball player (born 1991)

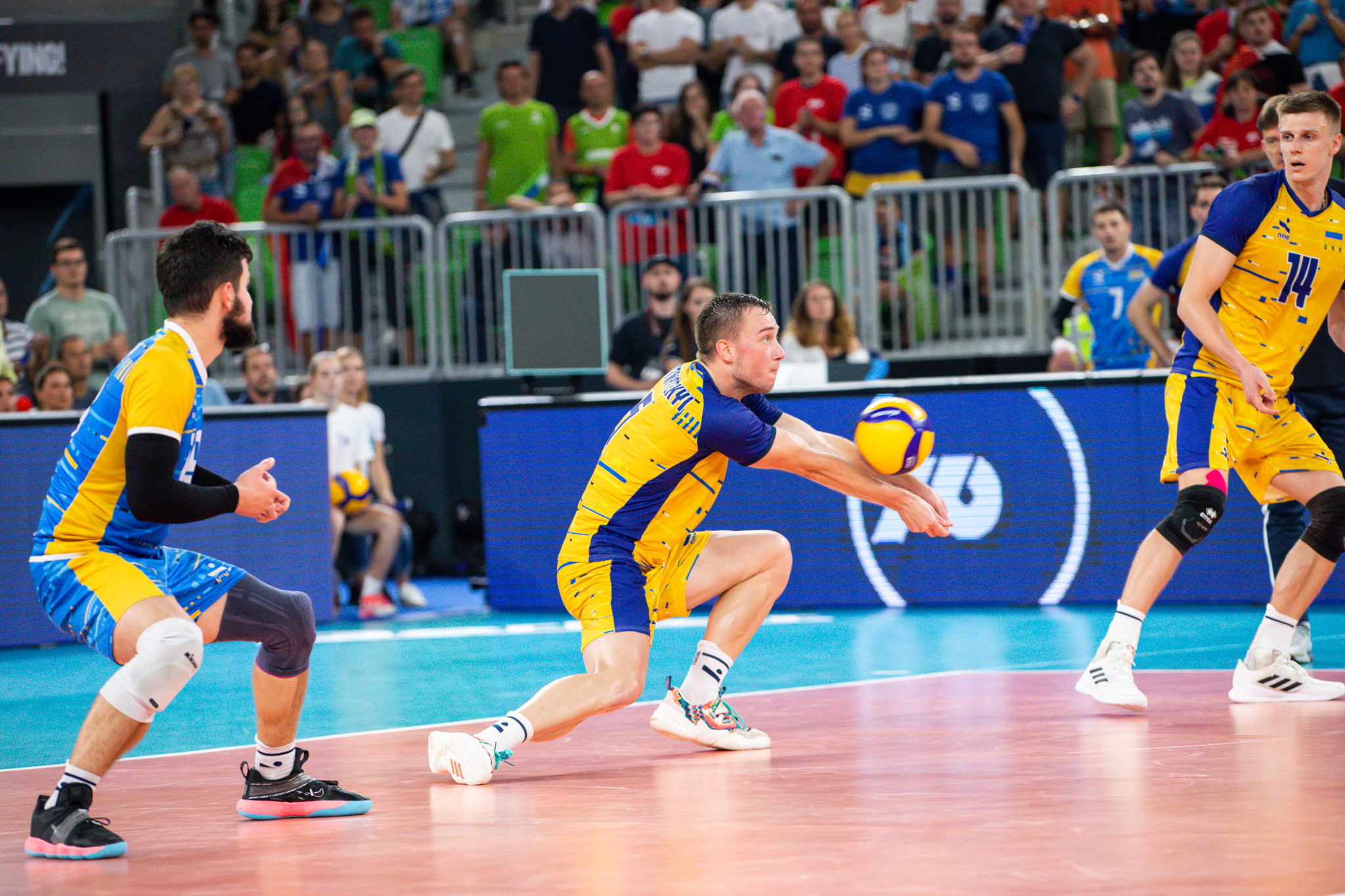

Personal information
- Nationality: Ukrainian
- Born: 8 April 1991 (age 35); Soledar, Ukraine
- Height: 6 ft 2 in (1.89 m)
- Weight: 181 lb (82 kg)
- Spike: 120 in (300 cm)
- Block: 124 in (315 cm)

Volleyball information
- Position: Libero
- Current club: (Ukraine) Barkom-Kazhany

Career
Years	Teams
2011–2016; 2016-present	(Ukraine) Yurydychna Akademiya (Ukraine) Barkom-Kazhany

National team
Ukraine
Medal record
European Volleyball League
Gold medal – first place	2017 Denmark

Horden Brova (Ukrainian: Горден Брова; born 8 April 1991) is a Ukrainian volleyball player. He was a member of the Ukrainian national volleyball team and Barkom-Kazhany.

== Career ==
Horden Brova started his professional career in Yurydychna Akademiya.

He was a member of the Ukraine men's national volleyball team in 2019 Men's European Volleyball Championship.

== Sporting achievements ==
=== Clubs ===
Ukrainian Championship:

- 2017/18, 2018/19

Ukrainian Cup:

- 2016/17, 2017/18, 2018/19

Ukrainian Supercup:

- 2016/17, 2018/2019, 2019/2020

=== National team ===
- 2017 European League

=== Individual ===
- 2016/2017 Best libero (Ukraine) Ukrainian Super League
- 2017/2018 Best libero (Ukraine) Ukrainian Super League
- 2018/2019 Best libero (Ukraine) Ukrainian Super League
- 2016/2017 Best libero (Ukraine) Ukrainian Cup
