= Oleh Shevchenko =

Ukrainian volleyball player (born 1993)

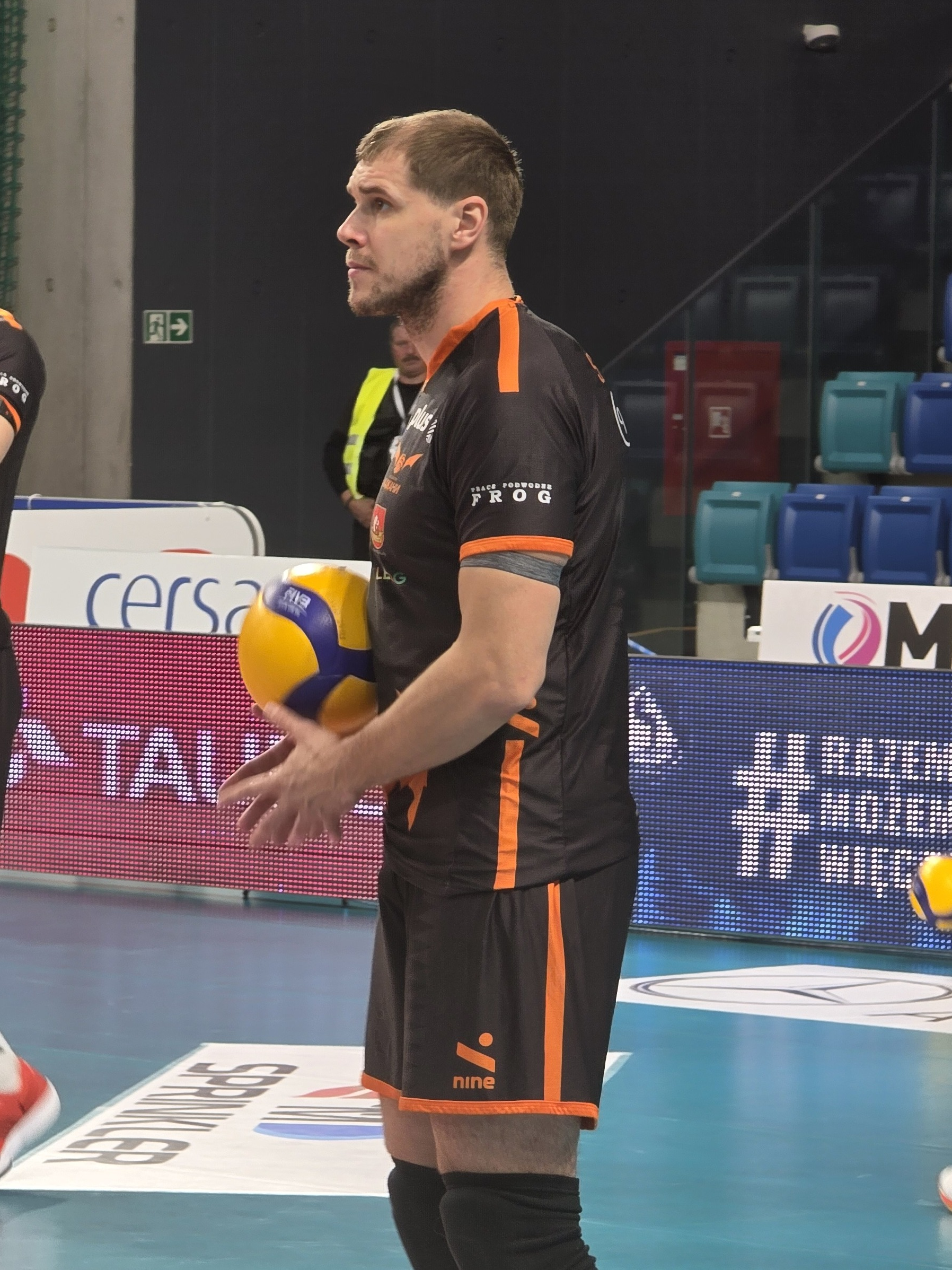
- Oleh Shevchenko in 2025

Personal information
- Nationality: Ukrainian
- Born: January 8, 1993 (age 33); Kharkiv, Ukraine
- Height: 6 ft 4 in (1.94 m)
- Weight: 209 lb (95 kg)
- Spike: 120 in (305 cm)
- Block: 128 in (325 cm)

Volleyball information
- Position: Οutside Hitter
- Current club: (Ukraine) Barkom-Kazhany

Career
Years	Teams
2011–2016; 2016–2017; 2017–2018; 2018; 2018–present	(Ukraine) Yurydychna Akademiya (Kazakhstan) Atyrau VC (Ukraine) Lokomotyv Kharkiv (Kazakhstan) Atyrau VC (Ukraine) Barkom-Kazhany

National team
Ukraine
Medal record
European Volleyball League
Gold medal – first place	2017 Denmark

Oleh Shevchenko (Ukrainian: Олег Шевченко (born January 8, 1993) is a Ukrainian volleyball player, a member of the Ukraine men's national volleyball team and Barkom-Kazhany.

== Career ==
Oleh Shevchenko started his professional career in Yurydychna Akademiya.

He was a member of the Ukraine men's national volleyball team in 2019 Men's European Volleyball Championship.

== Sporting achievements ==
=== Clubs ===
Kazakhstan Championship:

- x1 2017/18

(Ukraine) Ukrainian Championship:

- x1 2018/19

(Ukraine) Ukrainian Cup:

- x1 2018/19

(Ukraine) Ukrainian Supercup:

- x2 2018/2019, 2019/2020

=== National team ===
- 2017 European League

=== Individual ===
- 2015/2016 Best Opposite (Ukraine) Ukrainian Super League
- 2017/2018 Best Οutside Hitter (Ukraine) Ukrainian Super League
- 2018/2019 Best Οutside Hitter (Ukraine) Ukrainian Super League
- 2018/2019 MVP (Ukraine) Ukrainian Cup
