= Vladyslav Didenko =

Ukrainian volleyball player (born 1992)

Personal information
- Nationality: Ukrainian
- Born: September 19, 1992 (age 34) Pervomaiskyi, Kharkiv Oblast, Ukraine
- Height: 6 ft 3 in (1.90 m)
- Weight: 181 lb (82 kg)
- Spike: 120 in (300 cm)
- Block: 124 in (315 cm)

Volleyball information
- Position: Setter
- Current club: (Ukraine) Epicentr-Podoliany

Career
- Years: Team
- 2013–2015 2015–2018 2018–2019 2019–2020 2019–2020 2020–present: (Ukraine) Yurydychna Akademiya Kharkiv (Ukraine) Barkom-Kazhany (Ukraine) MHP-Vinnytsia (France) Grand Nancy Volley-Ball (Russia) Gazprom-Ugra Surgut (Ukraine) Epicentr-Podoliany

National team
- Years: Team
- –: Ukraine

Vladyslav Didenko (Ukrainian: Владислав Діденко (born September 19, 1992) is a Ukrainian volleyball player, a member of the Ukraine men's national volleyball team and Epicentr-Podoliany.

== Career ==
Vladyslav Didenko started his professional career in Yurydychna Akademiya Kharkiv.

He was a member of the Ukraine men's national volleyball team in 2019 Men's European Volleyball Championship.

== Sporting achievements ==
=== Clubs ===
Ukrainian Championship:

- x1 2017/18

Ukrainian Cup:

- x2 2016/17, 2017/18

Ukrainian Supercup:

- x1 2016/17

Vyshcha Liha:

- x1 2013/14

=== Individual ===
- 2015/2016 Best Setter (Ukraine) Ukrainian Championship
- 2016/2017 Best Setter (Ukraine) Ukrainian Championship
- 2016/2017 Best Setter (Ukraine) Ukrainian Cup
- 2017/2018 Best Setter (Ukraine) Ukrainian Cup
- 2017/2018 MVP (Ukraine) Ukrainian Championship
