= Yevhen Kapaiev =

Ukrainian volleyball player (b. 1984)

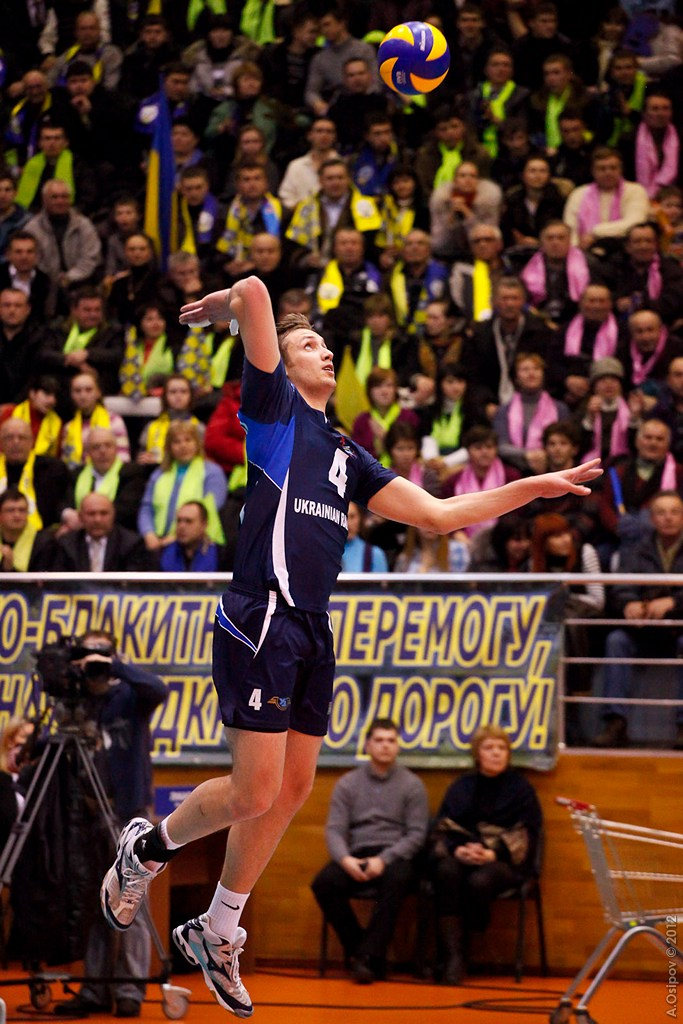

Personal information
- Nationality: Ukrainian
- Born: September 12, 1984 (age 42) Makiivka
- Height: 6 ft 6 in (1.99 m)
- Weight: 220 lb (100 kg)
- Spike: 130 in (340 cm)
- Block: 132 in (335 cm)

Volleyball information
- Position: Outside hitter
- Current club: (Ukraine) VC Lokomotyv Kharkiv

Career
- Years: Team
- 2004–2015 2015–2017 2017–2018 2018–2019 2019–2020 2020-present: (Ukraine) Lokomotyv Kharkiv (Ukraine) Barkom-Kazhany (Ukraine) Lokomotyv Kharkiv (Poland) Ślepsk Suwałki (Ukraine) Lokomotyv Kharkiv (Ukraine) Reshetylivka

Yevhen Kapaiev (Ukrainian: Євген Капаєв (born September 12, 1984) is a professional Ukrainian volleyball player and captain of the Lokomotyv Kharkiv in Ukrainian Super League.

== Career ==
In July 2017 Kapaiev returned to the Lokomotyv Kharkiv.

== Sporting achievements ==
=== Clubs ===
Ukrainian Championship:

- 2005, 2007, 2009, 2010, 2011, 2012, 2013, 2014

Ukrainian Cup:

- 2006, 2007, 2008, 2009, 2010, 2011, 2012, 2013, 2014
