= Denys Fomin =

Ukrainian volleyball player

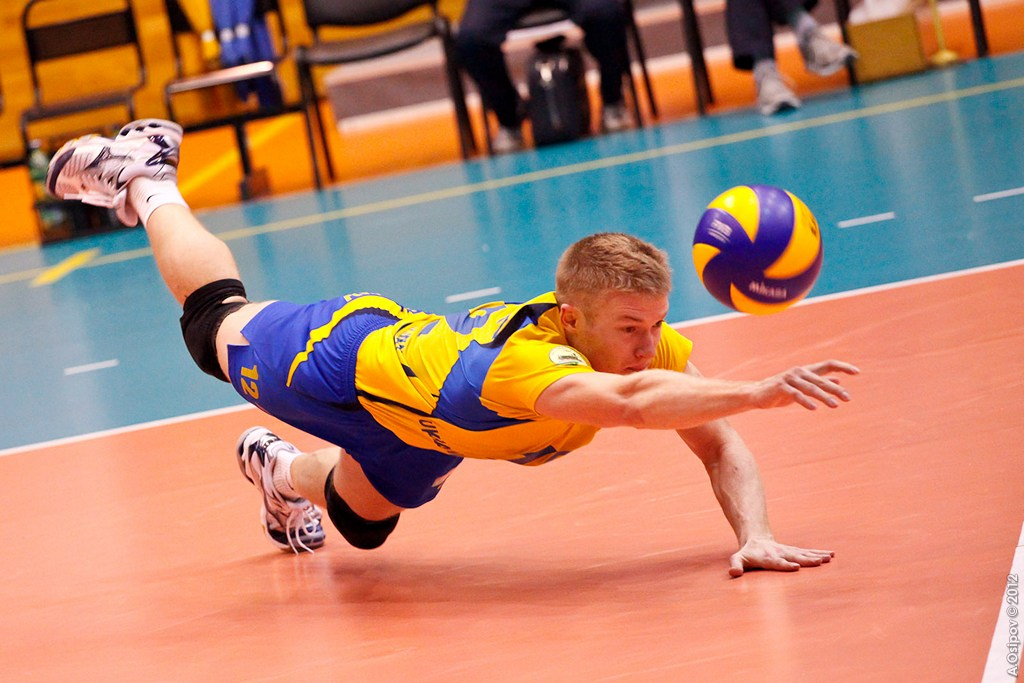
- Fomin in 2012

Personal information
- Nationality: Ukrainian
- Born: July 21, 1986 (age 40); Zherebkove, Ananiv Raion, Odesa Oblast, Ukraine
- Height: 5 ft 10 in (1.77 m)
- Weight: 176 lb (80 kg)
- Spike: 104 in (265 cm)
- Block: 110 in (280 cm)

Volleyball information
- Position: Libero
- Current club: (Ukraine) Epicentr-Podoliany

Career
Years	Teams
2009–2018; 2018–2019; 2019–2020; 2020–present	(Ukraine) Lokomotyv Kharkiv (Ukraine) Sertse Podillia (France) Cambrai Volley (Ukraine) Epicentr-Podoliany

National team
Ukraine
Honours
European Volleyball League
Gold medal – first place	2017 Denmark

Denys Fomin (Ukrainian: Денис Фомін (born July 21, 1986) is a Ukrainian volleyball player, a member of the Ukraine men's national volleyball team and Epicentr-Podoliany.

== Career ==
Denys Fomin started his professional career in Lokomotyv Kharkiv.

He was a member of the Ukraine men's national volleyball team in 2019 Men's European Volleyball Championship.

== Sporting achievements ==
=== Clubs ===
Ukrainian Championship:

- x8 2009/2010, 2010/11, 2011/12, 2012/13, 2013/14, 2014/15, 2015/16, 2016/2017

Ukrainian Cup:

- x7 2009/2010, 2010/11, 2011/12, 2012/13, 2013/14, 2014/15, 2015/16

Ukrainian Supercup:

- x1 2017/18

=== National team ===
- 2017 European League

=== Individual ===
- 2017/2018 Best Libero (Ukraine) Ukrainian Cup
- 2018/2019 Best Libero (Ukraine) Ukrainian Cup
