= Yurii Semeniuk =

Ukrainian volleyball player (born 1993)

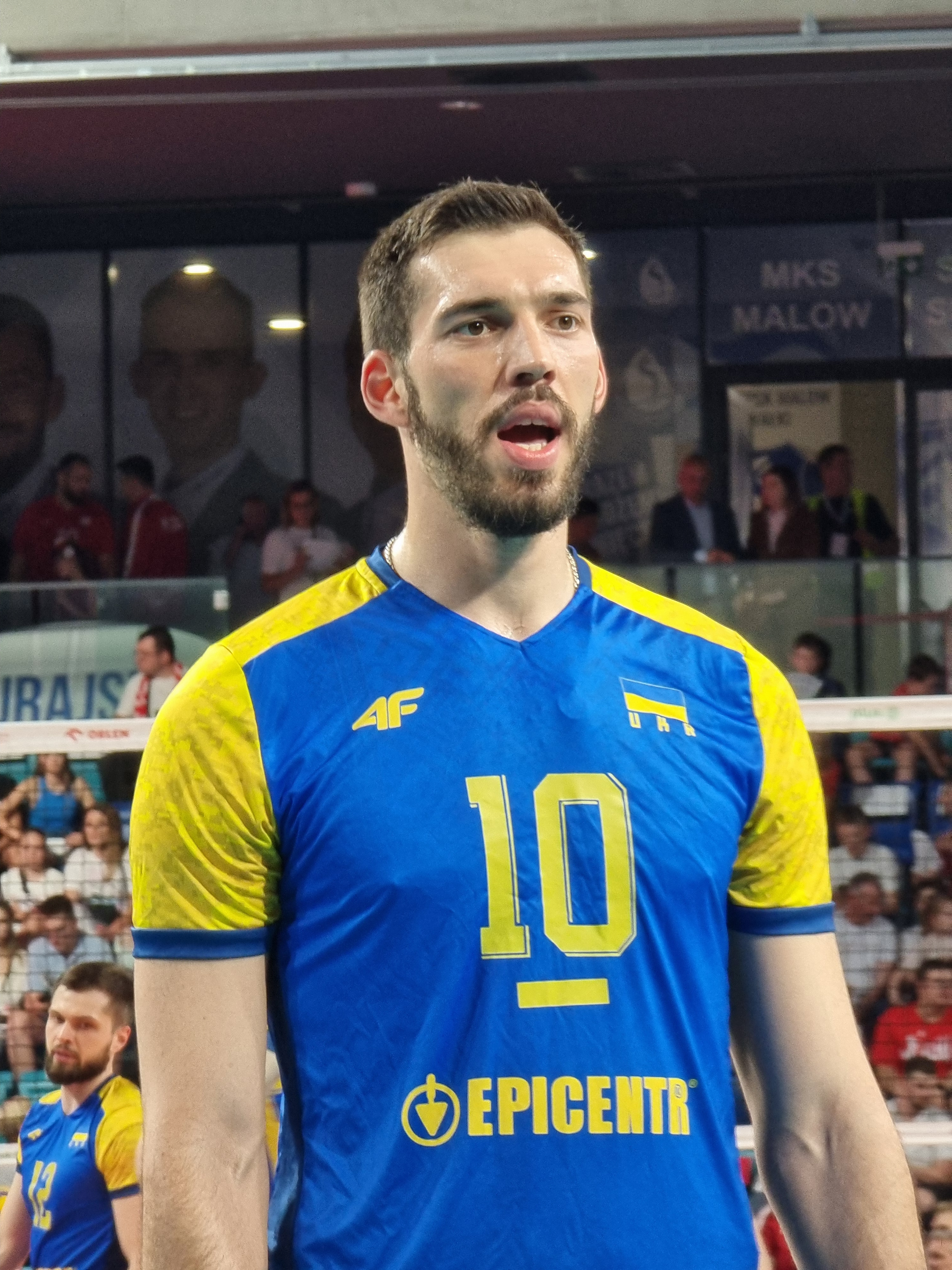
- Semeniuk in 2024

Personal information
- Full name: Yurii Hennadiiovych Semeniuk
- Born: 12 May 1994 (age 32) Lviv, Ukraine
- Height: 2.10 m (6 ft 11 in)
- Weight: 114 kg (251 lb)
- Spike: 360 cm (142 in)
- Block: 340 cm (134 in)

Volleyball information
- Position: Middle blocker
- Current club: Projekt Warsaw
- Number: 9

Career
- Years: Team
- 2016–2019 2019–2020 2020–2021 2021–2022 2022–: Barkom-Kazhany; Greenyard Maaseik; Barkom-Kazhany; Epicentr-Podolyany; Projekt Warsaw

National team
- Years: Team
- –: Ukraine
Honours
Men's volleyball
Representing Ukraine
European League
Gold medal – first place	2017 Gentofte
Gold medal – first place	2024 Osijek
Silver medal – second place	2021 Kortrijk
Silver medal – second place	2023 Zadar

Yurii Hennadiiovych Semeniuk (Ukrainian: Юрій Геннадійович Семенюк; born 12 May 1994) is a Ukrainian professional volleyball player who plays as a middle blocker for Projekt Warsaw and the Ukraine national team.

== Honours ==
=== Club ===
- CEV Challenge Cup
  - 2023–24 – with Projekt Warsaw
- Domestic
  - 2018–19 Ukrainian SuperCup, with Barkom-Kazhany
  - 2018–19 Ukrainian Cup, with Barkom-Kazhany
  - 2018–19 Ukrainian Championship, with Barkom-Kazhany
  - 2020–21 Ukrainian SuperCup, with Barkom-Kazhany
  - 2020–21 Ukrainian Cup, with Barkom-Kazhany
  - 2020–21 Ukrainian Championship, with Barkom-Kazhany
  - 2021–22 Ukrainian Championship, with Barkom-Kazhany

=== Individual awards ===
- 2024: CEV Challenge Cup – Most valuable player
