= Shakhtar =

Shakhtar, Shakhtyor or Shakhter ('miner' in some Slavic languages) may refer to:

- FC Shakhtar Donetsk, a Ukrainian football club
- MFC Shakhtar Donetsk, a Ukrainian futsal club
- VC Shakhtar Donetsk, a defunct Ukrainian volleyball club
- PFC Shakhtar Sverdlovsk, a Ukrainian football club
- FC Shakhtyor Soligorsk, a Belarusian football club
- HC Shakhtyor Soligorsk, a Belarusian hockey club
- FC Shakhter Karagandy, a Kazakh football club
- FC Shakhtyor Prokopyevsk, a former Russian football club
- FC Shakhtyor Shakhty, a Russian football club 1958–2004, later FC Burevestnik-YuRGUES Shakhty
