= Volleyball at the 2011 Summer Universiade – Men's tournament =

The men's tournament of volleyball at the 2011 Summer Universiade at Shenzhen, China began on August 12 and ended on August 22.

== Teams ==
Americas	Asia	Europe	Oceania
Brazil; Canada; Mexico; United States	China; Japan; Hong Kong; Iran; Oman; South Korea; Thailand; United Arab Emirates	Czech Republic; Israel; Norway; Russia; Switzerland; Sweden; Turkey; Ukraine	Australia

== Preliminary round ==
=== Group A ===
Pos	Team	Pld	W	L	Pts	SW	SL	SR	SPW	SPL	SPR
1	Canada	4	4	0	8	12	1	12.000	316	223	1.417
2	Switzerland	4	3	1	7	10	6	1.667	349	340	1.026
3	Australia	4	1	3	5	4	9	0.444	296	308	0.961
4	Norway	4	1	3	5	5	9	0.556	289	323	0.895
5	China	4	1	3	5	4	10	0.400	289	345	0.838

Date		Score		Set 1	Set 2	Set 3	Set 4	Set 5	Total
12 August	China	0–3	Norway	21–25	21–25	25–27			67–77
12 August	Switzerland	3–0	Australia	25–23	25–18	30–28			80–69
13 August	Australia	1–3	China	24–26	25–17	25–27	21–25		95–95
13 August	Canada	3–1	Switzerland	25–13	16–25	25–17	25–10		91–65
14 August	Norway	0–3	Australia	20–25	22–25	16–25			58–75
14 August	China	0–3	Canada	12–25	14–25	23–25			49–75
16 August	Switzerland	3–1	China	25–20	25–13	23–25	25–20		98–78
16 August	Canada	3–0	Norway	25–20	25–18	25–14			75–52
17 August	Norway	2–3	Switzerland	25–23	25–18	23–25	19–25	10–15	102–106
17 August	Australia	0–3	Canada	20–25	17–25	20–25			57–75

=== Group B ===
Pos	Team	Pld	W	L	Pts	SW	SL	SR	SPW	SPL	SPR
1	Russia	4	4	0	8	12	2	6.000	344	266	1.293
2	Ukraine	4	3	1	7	9	3	3.000	300	272	1.103
3	Iran	4	2	2	6	7	9	0.778	364	372	0.978
4	Japan	4	1	3	5	6	9	0.667	317	338	0.938
5	Oman	4	0	4	4	1	12	0.083	240	317	0.757

Date		Score		Set 1	Set 2	Set 3	Set 4	Set 5	Total
12 August	Oman	0–3	Russia	15–25	10–25	20–25			45–75
12 August	Japan	0–3	Ukraine	19–25	22–25	22–25			63–75
13 August	Iran	3–1	Oman	25–17	27–25	15–25	25–22		92–89
13 August	Russia	3–1	Japan	25–18	24–26	25–15	25–19		99–78
14 August	Ukraine	0–3	Russia	22–25	22–25	19–25			63–75
14 August	Japan	2–3	Iran	26–24	18–25	26–24	16–25	15–17	101–115
16 August	Iran	0–3	Ukraine	33–35	25–27	19–25			77–87
16 August	Oman	0–3	Japan	17–25	17–25	15–25			49–75
17 August	Russia	3–1	Iran	25–14	25–23	20–25	25–18		95–80
17 August	Ukraine	3–0	Oman	25–23	25–19	25–15			75–57

=== Group C ===
Pos	Team	Pld	W	L	Pts	SW	SL	SR	SPW	SPL	SPR
1	Brazil	4	4	0	8	12	2	6.000	364	263	1.384
2	South Korea	4	3	1	7	10	6	1.667	384	333	1.153
3	Israel	4	2	2	6	9	6	1.500	323	305	1.059
4	Sweden	4	1	3	5	4	9	0.444	262	295	0.888
5	Hong Kong	4	0	4	4	0	12	0.000	163	300	0.543

Date		Score		Set 1	Set 2	Set 3	Set 4	Set 5	Total
12 August	South Korea	3–0	Hong Kong	25–8	25–19	25–15			75–42
12 August	Israel	3–0	Sweden	25–15	25–18	25–19			75–52
13 August	Brazil	3–1	South Korea	25–16	27–29	25–21	37–35		114–101
13 August	Hong Kong	0–3	Israel	18–25	13–25	13–25			44–75
15 August	Israel	1–3	Brazil	25–22	10–25	20–25	18–25		73–97
15 August	Sweden	3–0	Hong Kong	25–21	25–13	25–12			75–46
16 August	Brazil	3–0	Sweden	25–15	28–26	25–17			78–58
16 August	South Korea	3–2	Israel	23–25	23–25	25–17	26–24	15–9	112–100
17 August	Sweden	1–3	South Korea	25–19	12–25	15–25	25–27		77–96
17 August	Hong Kong	0–3	Brazil	12–25	10–25	9–25			31–75

=== Group D ===
Pos	Team	Pld	W	L	Pts	SW	SL	SR	SPW	SPL	SPR
1	Czech Republic	5	5	0	10	15	5	3.000	478	416	1.149
2	Thailand	5	4	1	9	13	4	3.250	415	344	1.206
3	United States	5	3	2	8	12	6	2.000	418	367	1.139
4	Mexico	5	2	3	7	6	9	0.667	323	365	0.885
5	Turkey	5	1	4	6	5	13	0.385	356	421	0.846
6	United Arab Emirates	5	0	5	5	1	15	0.067	313	390	0.803

Date		Score		Set 1	Set 2	Set 3	Set 4	Set 5	Total
12 August	Mexico	0–3	United States	17–25	23–25	15–25			55–75
12 August	Czech Republic	3–0	United Arab Emirates	25–19	25–18	25–20			75–57
12 August	Thailand	3–0	Turkey	30–28	25–21	25–10			80–59
13 August	United States	3–0	Turkey	25–18	25–9	25–20			75–47
13 August	United Arab Emirates	0–3	Thailand	21–25	23–25	10–25			54–75
13 August	Mexico	0–3	Czech Republic	19–25	18–25	30–32			67–82
15 August	Czech Republic	3–2	United States	25–23	25–23	23–25	25–27	15–13	113–111
15 August	Thailand	3–0	Mexico	25–14	25–21	25–16			75–51
15 August	Turkey	3–1	United Arab Emirates	15–25	25–17	25–20	25–19		90–81
16 August	United States	3–0	United Arab Emirates	25–21	25–13	25–20			75–54
16 August	Mexico	3–0	Turkey	25–23	25–21	25–22			75–66
16 August	Czech Republic	3–1	Thailand	25–22	23–25	25–20	25–20		98–87
17 August	Thailand	3–1	United States	25–15	23–25	25–19	25–23		98–82
17 August	Turkey	2–3	Czech Republic	25–22	18–25	25–23	15–25	11–15	94–110
17 August	United Arab Emirates	0–3	Mexico	22–25	22–25	23–25			67–75

== Quarterfinal Round ==
=== Classification 17-21 places ===
Date		Score		Set 1	Set 2	Set 3	Set 4	Set 5	Total
19 August	Oman	3–2	United Arab Emirates	19–25	25–16	22–25	25–22	15–11	106–99

=== Classification 9-16 places ===
Date		Score		Set 1	Set 2	Set 3	Set 4	Set 5	Total
19 August	Australia	3–2	Sweden	14–25	25–21	20–25	25–16	15–12	99–99
19 August	United States	2–3	Japan	20–25	25–23	30–28	21–25	11–15	107–116
19 August	Israel	3–0	Norway	28–26	25–17	25–16			78–59
19 August	Iran	3–0	Mexico	27–25	25–23	25–16			77–64

=== Quarterfinals ===
Date		Score		Set 1	Set 2	Set 3	Set 4	Set 5	Total
19 August	Russia	3–0	Thailand	25–21	25–21	25–22			75–64
19 August	Brazil	3–0	Switzerland	25–13	25–22	25–21			75–56
19 August	Canada	3–1	South Korea	22–25	25–23	25–16	25–21		97–85
19 August	Czech Republic	2–3	Ukraine	25–19	23–25	25–27	25–23	11–15	109–109

== Semifinal Round ==
=== Classification 17-20 places ===
Date		Score		Set 1	Set 2	Set 3	Set 4	Set 5	Total
20 August	China	0–3	Turkey	15–25	13–25	18–25			46–75
20 August	Hong Kong	0–3	Oman	19–25	11–25	17–25			47–75

=== Classification 13-16 places ===
Date		Score		Set 1	Set 2	Set 3	Set 4	Set 5	Total
20 August	Sweden	1–3	United States	21–25	26–24	10–25	25–27		82–101
20 August	Norway	3–0	Mexico	25–23	25–18	25–18			75–59

=== Classification 9-12 places ===
Date		Score		Set 1	Set 2	Set 3	Set 4	Set 5	Total
20 August	Australia	0–3	Japan	10–25	18–25	23–25			51–75
20 August	Israel	3–0	Iran	25–0	25–0	25–0			75–0

=== Classification 5-8 places ===
Date		Score		Set 1	Set 2	Set 3	Set 4	Set 5	Total
20 August	Switzerland	0–3	Thailand	16–25	14–25	16–25			46–75
20 August	South Korea	3–2	Czech Republic	28–30	25–16	25–19	14–25	15–12	107–102

=== Semifinals ===
Date		Score		Set 1	Set 2	Set 3	Set 4	Set 5	Total
20 August	Brazil	1–3	Russia	25–27	25–15	16–25	25–27		91–94
20 August	Canada	1–3	Ukraine	25–27	23–25	25–20	10–25		83–97

== Final round ==
=== 19th place ===
Date		Score		Set 1	Set 2	Set 3	Set 4	Set 5	Total
21 August	China	3–2	Hong Kong	22–25	25–22	27–29	25–18	15–11	114–105

=== 17th place ===
Date		Score		Set 1	Set 2	Set 3	Set 4	Set 5	Total
21 August	Turkey	3–1	Oman	25–21	25–23	24–26	25–22		99–92

=== 15th place ===
Date		Score		Set 1	Set 2	Set 3	Set 4	Set 5	Total
21 August	Sweden	3–1	Mexico	25–21	25–20	25–27	25–18		100–86

=== 13th place ===
Date		Score		Set 1	Set 2	Set 3	Set 4	Set 5	Total
21 August	United States	3–1	Norway	25–19	22–25	25–16	25–14		98–74

=== 11th place ===
Date		Score		Set 1	Set 2	Set 3	Set 4	Set 5	Total
21 August	Australia	3–0	Iran	25–0	25–0	25–0			75–0

=== 9th place ===
Date		Score		Set 1	Set 2	Set 3	Set 4	Set 5	Total
21 August	Japan	3–0	Israel	26–24	25–18	30–28			81–70

=== 7th place ===
Date		Score		Set 1	Set 2	Set 3	Set 4	Set 5	Total
21 August	Czech Republic	3–0	Switzerland	25–23	25–15	25–20			75–58

=== 5th place ===
Date		Score		Set 1	Set 2	Set 3	Set 4	Set 5	Total
21 August	South Korea	3–2	Thailand	25–19	23–25	27–25	16–25	15–7	106–101

=== Bronze medal match ===
Date		Score		Set 1	Set 2	Set 3	Set 4	Set 5	Total
22 August	Canada	1–3	Brazil	20–25	15–25	25–19	19–25		79–94

=== Gold Medal match ===
Date		Score		Set 1	Set 2	Set 3	Set 4	Set 5	Total
23 August	Ukraine	1–3	Russia	21–25	23–25	25–22	14–25		83–97

== Final standings ==
Place	Team	Score
1st place, gold medalist(s)	Russia	7–0
2nd place, silver medalist(s)	Ukraine	5–2
3rd place, bronze medalist(s)	Brazil	6–1
4	Canada	5–2
5	South Korea	5–2
6	Thailand	5–3
7	Czech Republic	6–2
8	Switzerland	3–4
9	Japan	4–3
10	Israel	4–3
11	Australia	3–4
12	Iran	3–4
13	United States	5–3
14	Norway	2–5
15	Sweden	2–5
16	Mexico	2–6
17	Turkey	3–4
18	Oman	2–5
19	China	2–4
20	Hong Kong	0–6
21	United Arab Emirates	0–6
