= Volleyball at the 2011 Summer Universiade =

Volleyball was contested at the 2011 Summer Universiade from August 12 to August 22 at the Shenzhen Gym and surrounding venues in Shenzhen, China.

== Medal summary ==
=== Medal table ===
Rank	Nation	Gold	Silver	Bronze	Total
1	Brazil (BRA)	1	0	1	2
1	Russia (RUS)	1	0	1	2
3	China (CHN)	0	1	0	1
3	Ukraine (UKR)	0	1	0	1
Totals (4 entries)		2	2	2	6

=== Events ===
Event	Gold	Silver	Bronze
Men	Russia (RUS); Yevgeni Sivozhelez; Pavel Kruglov; Aleksandr Abrosimov; Anton Dubrovin; Konstantin Lesik; Roman Martynyuk; Mikhail Shcherbakov; Vasily Nosenko; Alexey Obmochaev; Sergei Bagrey; Alexander Gutsalyuk; Nikolay Leonenko	Ukraine (UKR); Pylyp Harmash; Dmytro Shavrak; Oleksiy Klymar; Volodymyr Kovalchuk; Oleksandr Zhumatii; Ruslan Yushkevych; Andriy Savin; Viktor Shchekaliuk; Andrii Tupchii; Andriy Levchenko; Dmytro Babkov; Ruslan Shevtsov	Brazil (BRA); Maurício Souza; Luiz Felipe Fonteles; Murilo Radke; Túlio Nogueira; Thiago Alves; Gustavo Bonatto; Tiago Brendle; Renan Buiatti; Carlos Faccin; Éder Carbonera; Rogério Nogueira; Wallace de Souza
Women	Brazil (BRA); Fernanda Alves; Tássia Silva; Regiane Bidias; Mariana Costa; Flávia Kuchenbecker; Fernanda Isis da Silva; Michelle Pavão; Ana Carolina da Silva; Roberta Ratzke; Amanda Francisco; Natasha Farinea; Juliana Nogueira	China (CHN); Xi Xi; Bian Yuqian; Li Xinyun; Wang Lili; Zhu Huijing; Zhang Yuan; Zhang Lei; Ma Xiaoying; Xiao Yanwen; Zhang Yichan; Shen Yi; Chen Yina	Russia (RUS); Yana Shcherban; Irina Stratanovich; Valeriya Goncharova; Ekaterina Osichkina; Daria Vekshina; Daria Stolyarova; Kseniia Bondar; Victoria Rusakova; Daria Pisarenko; Irina Uraleva; Svetlana Sourtseva; Regina Moroz

== Men ==
The men's tournament took place on 12–17 August and 19–22 August. 22 teams participated in the men's tournament.

=== Teams ===
Pool A

- China
- Canada
- Switzerland
- Australia
- Norway

Pool B

- Russia
- Ukraine
- Japan
- Iran
- Oman

Pool C

- Brazil
- South Korea
- Sweden
- Hong Kong
- Israel

Pool D

- Czech Republic
- Turkey
- United States
- United Arab Emirates
- Mexico
- Thailand

== Women ==
The women's tournament took place on 14–16 August and 18–21 August. 16 teams participated in the women's tournament.

=== Teams ===
Pool A

- China
- Japan
- Sweden
- Belgium

Pool B

- Italy
- Brazil
- Ukraine

Pool C

- Poland
- Chinese Taipei
- Canada
- France

Pool D

- Russia
- Thailand
- Norway
- Hong Kong
