= Lukas Kampa =

German volleyball player (born 1986)

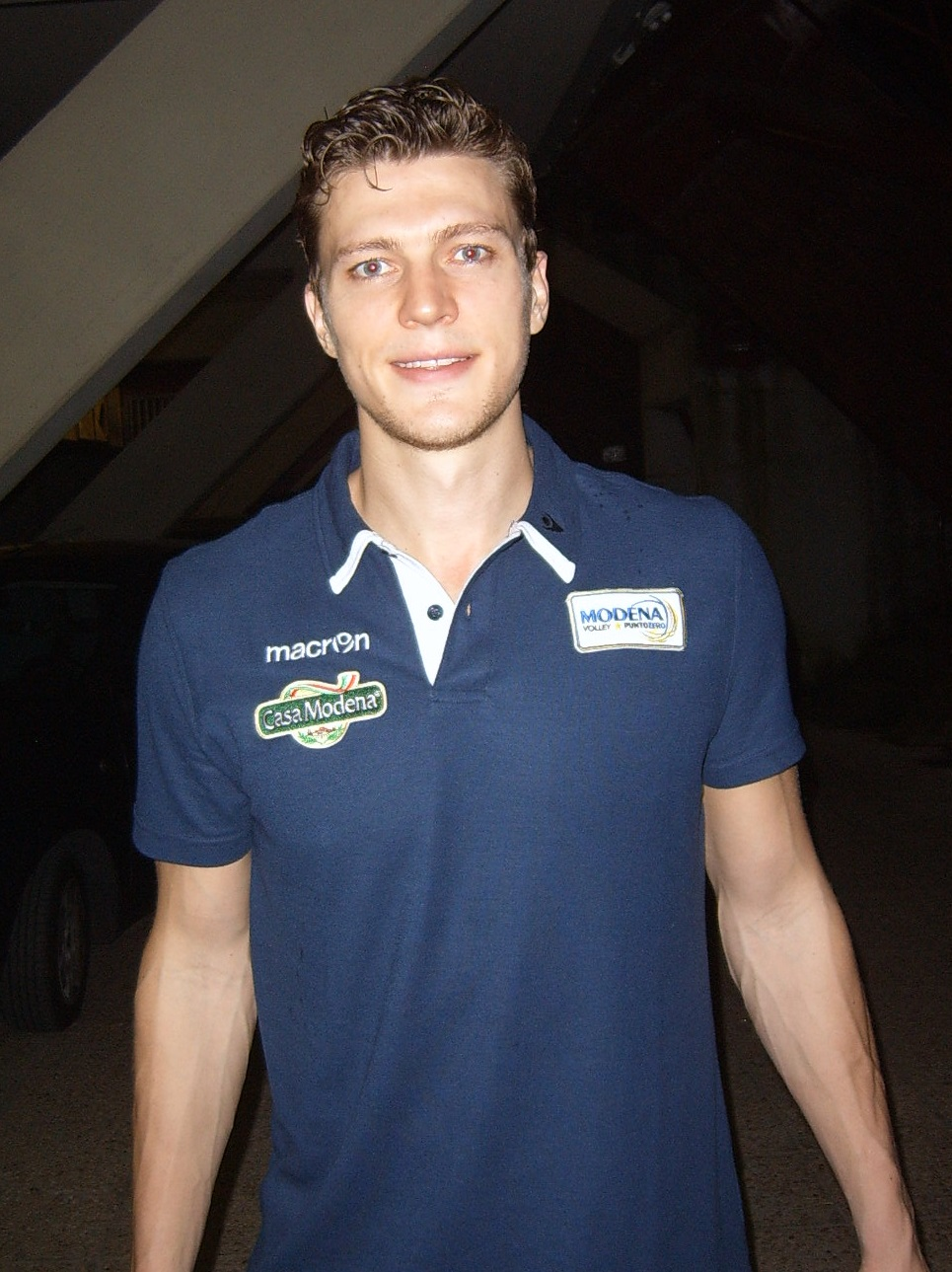

Personal information
- Full name: Lukas Immanuel Kampa
- Born: 29 November 1986 (age 39); Bochum, West Germany
- Height: 1.93 m (6 ft 4 in)
- Weight: 90 kg (198 lb)
- Spike: 340 cm (134 in)
- Block: 324 cm (128 in)

Volleyball information
- Position: Setter

Career
Years	Teams
2006–2008; 2008–2010; 2010–2011; 2011–2012; 2012–2013; 2013; 2013–2014; 2014–2016; 2016–2021; 2021–2025; 2025–2026	Moerser SC; VfB Friedrichshafen; VC Bottrop 90; Copra Elior Piacenza; Belogorie Belgorod; Lokomotiv Kharkiv; Modena Volley; Czarni Radom; Jastrzębski Węgiel; Trefl Gdańsk; Barkom-Kazhany Lviv

National team
2008–2024	Germany
Honours
Men's volleyball
Representing Germany
FIVB World Championship
Bronze medal – third place	2014 Poland
CEV European Championship
Silver medal – second place	2017 Poland
European Games
Gold medal – first place	2015 Baku

Lukas Immanuel Kampa (born 29 November 1986) is a German professional volleyball player who plays as a setter. Kampa is a former member of the Germany national team.

== Personal life ==
Kampa was born in Bochum, West Germany as a son of Ulrich Kampa – a former volleyball player. He has a sister and a brother David, who is also a volleyball player. He relocated his family to Poland where he has lived for the past 10 years.

== Career ==
In 2014, Kampa signed a contract with the Polish PlusLiga team, Cerrad Czarni Radom. In 2016, he joined Jastrzębski Węgiel.

Kampa was a bronze medallist at the 2014 World Championship and named the Best Setter of the whole tournament.

== Honours ==
=== Club ===
- Domestic
  - 2008–09 German Championship, with VfB Friedrichshafen
  - 2009–10 German Championship, with VfB Friedrichshafen
  - 2012–13 Russian Cup, with Belogorie Belgorod
  - 2012–13 Ukrainian Championship, with Lokomotiv Kharkiv
  - 2020–21 Polish Championship, with Jastrzębski Węgiel

=== Individual awards ===
- 2014: FIVB World Championship – Best setter
- 2015: German volleyball player of the year
- 2017: German volleyball player of the year

Awards
Preceded by (Serbia) Nikola Grbić	Best Setter of FIVB World Championship; 2014	Succeeded by (United States) Micah Christenson
