= Lazar Ćirović =

Serbian volleyball player (born 1992)

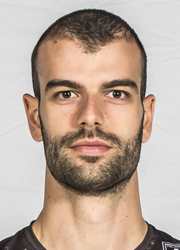

Personal information
- Nationality: (Serbia) Serb
- Born: 26 February 1992 (age 34); Kragujevac, SR Serbia, SFR Yugoslavia

Volleyball information
- Position: Outside hitter
- Current club: (China) Jiangsu Volleyball

Career
Years	Teams
2007–2014; 2014–2015; 2015–2016; 2016–2017; 2017–2019; 2019; 2019–	(Serbia) Radnički Kragujevac (Montenegro) Budvanska Rivijera Budva (Turkey) Afyon Belediyespor (Greece) Panathinaikos Athens (Italy) Kioene Padova (Serbia) Radnički Kragujevac (China) Jiangsu Volleyball

National team
2015–	Serbia
Honours
Representing Serbia
Men's volleyball
CEV European Championship
Gold medal – first place	2019 Belgium/France/Netherlands/Slovenia

Lazar Ćirović (Serbian Cyrillic: Лазар Ћировић, Serbian pronunciation: [[lazar t͡ɕirɔʋit͡ɕ]], born 26 February 1992) is a Serbian volleyball player, a member of the Serbia men's national volleyball team and Chinese club Jiangsu Volleyball. 2019 European Champion.

== Sporting achievements ==
=== National championships ===
- 2007/2008 Serbian Cup, with Radnički Kragujevac
- 2007/2008 Serbian Championship, with Radnički Kragujevac
- 2008/2009 Serbian Championship, with Radnički Kragujevac
- 2009/2010 Serbian Championship, with Radnički Kragujevac
- 2014/2015 Montenegrin Cup, with Budvanska Rivijera Budva
