= VC Shakhtar Donetsk =

VC Shakhtar Donetsk is a volleyball club from Donetsk. It won the Soviet Volleyball Championship in 1992, and was the last to do so.

== History ==
The club was formed in 1983, and after finishing second in the 1983/84 second tier season, the club got promoted, and played 5 seasons in that the top Soviet league. The club finished runner-up in 1990/91, and as a champion in 1991/92/

Except the 1992 championship, it was a runner up in 1991. Almost the whole championship line-up left to clubs abroad

The team also won the first two (1992, 1993) Ukrainian championships, and finished third once (1995), but in 1997 after releasing players due to financial difficulties the club finished last in the league and was relegated. In 1998 the club finished 10th in the second tear, and was shut down.

== Honours ==
- (Soviet Union) Soviet Volleyball Championship
  - Winners (1): 1992
  - Runner-Up (1): 1991
- (Ukraine) Ukrainian Volleyball Championship
  - Winners (2): 1992, 1993
  - Third place (1): 1995
- (Ukraine) Ukrainian Volleyball Cup
  - Winners (1): 1993
