= VC Epicentr-Podolyany =

Ukrainian professional men's volleyball team

- Full name: Volleyball Club Epicentr-Podolyany
- Short name: Epicentr-Podolyany
- Founded: 2018
- Manager: Mariusz Sordyl
- League: Ukrainian Super League

Epicentr-Podolyany (Ukrainian: Епіцентр-Подоляни) is a Ukrainian professional men's volleyball team, based in Horodok (Khmelnytskyi Oblast), playing in Ukrainian Super League.

== Achievements ==
- Ukrainian Super League
  (x2) 2022, 2025
- Vyshcha Liha (second division)
  (x1) 2020
- Druha Liha (third division)
  (x1) 2019
- Ukrainian Cup
  (x2) 2024, 2025

== Season by season ==
Season	Ukrainian Super League	Ukrainian Cup	Ukrainian Supercup	European competitions
2020–21	‒	‒	‒	CEV Challenge Cup ‒

== Team roster ==
Team roster in season 2020-21

Shirt No	Nationality	Player	Birth Date	Height	Position
1	Ukraine	Denys Fomin	July 21, 1986 (age 39)	1.77	Libero
2	Ukraine	Vladyslav Pavlyuk	March 29, 2000 (age 25)	1.93	Οutside Hitter
3	Ukraine	Ruslan Osypenko	November 1, 1999 (age 26)	1.97	Middle Blocker
4	Ukraine	Volodymyr Ostapenko	July 28, 1998 (age 27)	1.98	Middle Blocker
5	Ukraine	Illia Hlabai	August 2, 1997 (age 28)	1.93	Opposite
6	Ukraine	Oleksandr Buzduhan	April 6, 1995 (age 30)	1.97	Οutside Hitter
7	Ukraine	Dmytro Sukhinin	June 15, 1987 (age 38)	1.95	Οutside Hitter
8	Ukraine	Bohdan Sereda (C)	March 26, 1983 (age 42)	1.93	Setter
9	Ukraine	Yurii Palasiuk	May 6, 1987 (age 38)	2.01	Middle Blocker
10	Ukraine	Andrii Orobko	August 10, 1997 (age 28)	2.02	Middle Blocker
11	Ukraine	Vladyslav Didenko	September 29, 1992 (age 33)	1.90	Setter
13	Ukraine	Igor Vitiuk	January 29, 1988 (age 38)	1.97	Οutside Hitter
16	Ukraine	Daniil Anokhin	July 17, 1997 (age 28)	1.87	Libero
17	Ukraine	Yurii Tomyn	December 23, 1988 (age 37)	1.98	Οutside Hitter
18	Ukraine	Volodymyr Sydorenko	October 5, 1988 (age 37)	2.08	Οutside Hitter
44	Serbia	Marko Nikolić	June 22, 1990 (age 35)	1.93	Οutside Hitter

Starting lineup in season 2020-21

Shirt No	Player	Position
9	(Ukraine) Yurii Palasiuk	Middle Blocker
10	(Ukraine) Andrii Orobko	Οutside Hitter
11	(Ukraine) Vladyslav Didenko	Setter
17	(Ukraine) Yurii Tomyn	Οutside Hitter
13	(Ukraine) Igor Vitiuk	Οutside Hitter
1	(Ukraine) Denys Fomin	Libero

=== Technical staff ===
Technical staff
Head coach	(Ukraine) Yurii Melnychuk
Assistant coach	(Ukraine) Vadym Kulpa

=== Squad changes 2020/2021 ===
==== In ====
- (Ukraine) Denys Fomin from (France) Cambrai Volley
- (Ukraine) Vladyslav Didenko from (Russia) Yugra-Samotlor Nizhnevartovsk
- (Ukraine) Yurii Tomyn from (Ukraine) Barkom-Kazhany
- (Ukraine) Daniil Anokhin from (Ukraine) Yurydychna Akademiya Kharkiv
- (Ukraine) Vladyslav Pavlyuk from (Ukraine) Yurydychna Akademiya Kharkiv
- (Serbia) Marko Nikolić from (Serbia) OK Niš

==== Out ====
- (Ukraine) Dmytro Kozlovskyi to (Ukraine) Lokomotyv Kharkiv
