= Ukraine men's national volleyball team =

Men's national volleyball team representing Ukraine

Ukraine
- Association: Федерація Волейболу України
- Confederation: CEV
- Head coach: Raúl Lozano
- FIVB ranking: 11 (3 August 2026)

Uniforms
Home	Away

World Championship
- Appearances: 3 (First in 1998)
- Best result: 7th (2022)

European Championship
- Appearances: 8 (First in 1993)
- Best result: 6th (1993)
- www.fvu.in.ua (in Ukrainian)

Ukraine men's national volleyball team
Medal record

FIVB Challenger Cup
Bronze medal – third place	2023 Qatar	

European League
Gold medal – first place	2017 Gentofte	
Gold medal – first place	2024 Osijek	
Silver medal – second place	2021 Kortrijk	
Silver medal – second place	2023 Zadar	

Summer Universiade
Silver medal – second place	2011 Shenzhen	Team
Silver medal – second place	2015 Gwangju	Team

The Ukraine men's national volleyball team (Ukrainian: Чоловіча збірна України з волейболу, Cholovicha zbirna Ukrainy z voleibolu) represents Ukraine in international volleyball competitions and friendly matches. It is governed by the Ukrainian Volleyball Federation.

== Competition record ==
=== World Championship ===
World Championship record
Year	Round	Position	GP	MW	ML	SW	SL	Squad
(Greece) 1994	Did not qualify							
(Japan) 1998	9th-12th places	10th	12	4	8	15	27	Squad
(Argentina) 2002	Did not qualify							
(Japan) 2006	Did not qualify							
(Italy) 2010	Did not qualify							
(Poland) 2014	Did not qualify							
(Italy) (Bulgaria) 2018	Did not qualify							
(Poland) (Slovenia) 2022	Quarter-finals	7th	5	3	2	10	7	Squad
(Philippines) 2025	Preliminary round	24th	3	1	2	3	6	Squad
(Poland) 2027	Future event							
(Qatar) 2029	Future event							
Total:3/23	Quarter-finals	7th	20	8	12	28	40	—

=== Nations League ===
Nations League record
Year	Round	Position	GP	MW	ML	SW	SL	Squad
(France) 2018	Did not qualify							
(United States) 2019	Did not qualify							
(Italy) 2021	Did not qualify							
(Italy) 2022	Did not qualify							
(Poland) 2023	Did not qualify							
(Poland) 2024	Did not qualify							
(China) 2025	Preliminary round	10th	12	6	6	25	25	Squad
(China) 2026	Quarter-finals	7th	13	7	6	28	23	Squad
(N/A) 2027	Qualified							
Total:3/9	Quarter-finals	7th	25	13	12	53	48	—

=== Challenger Cup ===
3rd 4th

Challenger Cup record (Defunct)
Year	Round	Position	GP	MW	ML	SW	SL	Squad
(Portugal) 2018	Did not qualify							
(Slovenia) 2019	Did not qualify							
(South Korea) 2022	Did not qualify							
(Qatar) 2023	3rd place match	3rd	3	2	1	8	4	Squad
(China) 2024	3rd place match	4th	3	1	2	7	7	Squad
Total:2/5	3rd place	3rd	6	3	3	15	11	—

=== European Championship ===
European Championship record
Year	Round	Position	GP	MW	ML
1948–1991	As part of Soviet Union				
(Finland) 1993	Fifth Place Match	6th	7	4	3
(Greece) 1995	Preliminary Round	9th	5	1	4
(Netherlands) 1997	Seventh Place Match	7th	7	4	3
(Austria) 1999	did not qualify				
(Czech Republic) 2001	did not qualify				
(Germany) 2003	did not qualify				
(Serbia and Montenegro) (Italy) 2005	Preliminary Round	12th	5	0	5
(Russia) 2007	did not qualify				
(Turkey) 2009	did not qualify				
(Austria) (Czech Republic) 2011	did not qualify				
(Denmark) (Poland) 2013	did not qualify				
(Belgium) (France) (Netherlands) (Slovenia) 2019	Quarter-finals	7th	6	3	3
(Poland) (Czech Republic) (Estonia) (Finland) 2021	Round of 16	13th	6	3	3
(Israel) (North Macedonia) (Italy) (Bulgaria) 2023	Quarter-finals	8th	7	3	4
(Bulgaria) (Finland) (Italy) (Romania) 2026	Round of 16	10th	6	4	2
(Montenegro) 2028	To be determined				
Total:5/13	Quarter-finals	6th	49	22	27

=== European League ===
1st 2nd 3rd 4th

European League record
Year	Round	Position	GP	MW	ML	SW	SL
(Czech Republic) 2004	Did not qualify						
(Russia) 2005	Did not qualify						
(Turkey) 2006	Did not qualify						
(Portugal) 2007	Did not qualify						
(Turkey) 2008	Did not qualify						
(Portugal) 2009	Did not qualify						
(Spain) 2010	Did not qualify						
(Slovakia) 2011	Did not qualify						
(Turkey) 2012	Did not qualify						
(Turkey) 2013	Did not qualify						
(Montenegro) 2014	Did not qualify						
(Poland) 2015	Did not qualify						
(Bulgaria) 2016	Did not qualify						
(Denmark) 2017	Final	1st	8	7	1	21	10
(Czech Republic) 2018	League round	8th	6	3	3	13	13
(Estonia) 2019	League round	5th	6	4	2	15	9
(Belgium) 2021	Final	2nd	6	5	1	16	6
(Croatia) 2022	Semi-finals	4th	8	6	2	22	13
(Croatia) 2023	Final	2nd	8	7	1	23	4
(Croatia) 2024	Final	1st	8	6	2	21	9
(Czech Republic) 2025	Did not enter (Note: Participated in the Nations League)						
(Finland) (Netherlands) 2026	Did not enter						
Total:7/22	2 Titles		50	38	12	131	64

== Team ==
=== Current roster ===
Head coach:	(Argentina) Raúl Lozano
Assistants:	(Ukraine) Vladyslav Lazarchuk, (Ukraine) Ihor Rabkiv, (Ukraine) Ivan Slynchuk, (Latvia) Artūrs Tinte

No.	Name	Date of birth	Height	Weight	Spike	Block	Club
1	Tymofii Poluian	10 January 1998	1.98 m (6 ft 6 in)	88 kg (194 lb)	320 cm (130 in)	330 cm (130 in)	(Turkey) Sorgun
2	Maksym Drozd	5 August 1991	2.08 m (6 ft 10 in)	93 kg (205 lb)	328 cm (129 in)	320 cm (130 in)	(Ukraine) Epicentr-Podoliany
4	Oleh Shevchenko	8 January 1993	1.95 m (6 ft 5 in)	90 kg (200 lb)	340 cm (130 in)	320 cm (130 in)	(Ukraine) Barkom-Kazhany
5	Oleh Plotnytskyi (C)	5 June 1997	1.95 m (6 ft 5 in)	97 kg (214 lb)	320 cm (130 in)	300 cm (120 in)	(Italy) Perugia
7	Horden Brova	8 April 1991	1.90 m (6 ft 3 in)	80 kg (180 lb)	330 cm (130 in)	320 cm (130 in)	(Ukraine) Epicentr-Podoliany
8	Andrii Rohozhyn	13 July 1997	2.02 m (6 ft 8 in)	90 kg (200 lb)	335 cm (132 in)	315 cm (124 in)	(Ukraine) Epicentr-Podoliany
10	Yurii Semeniuk	12 May 1994	2.10 m (6 ft 11 in)	106 kg (234 lb)	330 cm (130 in)	325 cm (128 in)	(Ukraine) Epicentr-Podoliany
11	Vladyslav Didenko	29 September 1992	1.90 m (6 ft 3 in)	80 kg (180 lb)	300 cm (120 in)	305 cm (120 in)	(Ukraine) Epicentr-Podoliany
12	Denys Fomin	21 July 1986	1.77 m (5 ft 10 in)	72 kg (159 lb)	352 cm (139 in)	325 cm (128 in)	(Ukraine) Epicentr-Podoliany
14	Illia Kovalov	31 August 1996	1.98 m (6 ft 6 in)	86 kg (190 lb)			(Poland) Cuprum Lubin
15	Vitalii Shchytkov	25 November 1991	1.88 m (6 ft 2 in)	84 kg (185 lb)	325 cm (128 in)	311 cm (122 in)	(Ukraine) Zhytychi
16	Vitalii Kucher	27 October 1997	2.00 m (6 ft 7 in)	92 kg (203 lb)	350 cm (140 in)	315 cm (124 in)	(Ukraine) Barkom-Kazhany
18	Yan Yereshchenko	6 April 1990	1.97 m (6 ft 6 in)	82 kg (181 lb)	310 cm (120 in)	320 cm (130 in)	(Turkey) Develi
19	Dmytro Kanaiev	3 October 1997	1.75 m (5 ft 9 in)	73 kg (161 lb)	310 cm (120 in)	290 cm (110 in)	(Ukraine) Barkom-Kazhany
21	Yevhenii Kisiliuk	27 January 1995	1.97 m (6 ft 6 in)	95 kg (209 lb)	335 cm (132 in)	320 cm (130 in)	(Ukraine) Epicentr-Podoliany
22	Yurii Synytsia	22 August 1993	1.95 m (6 ft 5 in)	96 kg (212 lb)			(Ukraine) Zhytychi

== See also ==
- Ukraine women's national volleyball team
- Ukraine men's national under-21 volleyball team
