= Zhytychi Zhytomyr =

Ukrainian professional men's volleyball team

VC Zhytychi
- Full name: Volleyball Club Zhytychi
- Short name: Zhytychi
- Founded: 2017
- League: Ukrainian Super League

Zhytychi (Ukrainian: Житичі) is a Ukrainian professional men's volleyball team, based in Zhytomyr, playing in Ukrainian Super League.

== Achievements ==
- Vyshcha Liha
  (x1) 2019
- Ukrainian Cup
  (x1) 2020

== Team roster ==
Team roster in season 2020-21

Shirt No	Nationality	Player	Birth Date	Height	Position
1	Ukraine	Serhii Popov	August 6, 1991 (age 34)	1.87	Libero
2	Ukraine	Artem Omelchenko	June 18, 1993 (age 32)	2.02	Middle blocker
3	Ukraine	Dmytro Storozhylov	June 1, 1986 (age 39)	1.96	Setter
7	Ukraine	Dmytro Shorkin	December 26, 1989 (age 35)	1.91	Οutside Hitter
9	Ukraine	Vitalii Bondar	June 23, 1999 (age 26)	1.99	Οpposite
10	Bosnia and Herzegovina	Alen Didović	January 8, 1997 (age 28)	1.94	Οutside Hitter
11	Ukraine	Mykola Rudnytskyi	September 18, 1981 (age 44)	2.10	Middle blocker
12	Ukraine	Serhii Yevstratov	August 24, 1993 (age 32)	1.90	Setter
14	Ukraine	Viktor Shchekalyuk	February 17, 1988 (age 37)	2.05	Middle blocker
15	Ukraine	Dmytro Kuzmenko	February 2, 1988 (age 37)	1.80	Libero
17	Ukraine	Valentyn Burkovskyi	January 31, 1986 (age 39)	2.02	Middle blocker
18	Ukraine	Mykola Moroz	December 19, 1992 (age 32)	2.05	Οutside Hitter
23	Ukraine	Viktor Kraievskyi	January 12, 1988 (age 37)	1.88	Libero

=== Technical staff ===
Technical staff
Head coach	(Ukraine) Serhii Tereikovskyi
Assistant coach	(Ukraine) Oleksandr Dubovenko

== Notable players ==
- (Montenegro) Luka Babić
