= Sertse Podillia =

Ukrainian professional men's volleyball team

VC Sertse Podillia
- Full name: Volleyball Club Sertse Podillia
- Short name: Sertse Podillia
- Founded: 2010
- League: Ukrainian Super League
- 2018/2019: 2

Sertse Podillia (Ukrainian: Серце Поділля) is a Ukrainian professional men's volleyball team, based in Vinnytsia, playing in Ukrainian Super League.

== Achievements ==
- Ukrainian Super League
  (x1) 2019
- Ukrainian Cup
  (x1) 2019

== Team roster ==
Team roster in season 2019-20

Shirt No	Nationality	Player	Birth Date	Height	Position
1	Ukraine	Stanislav Lyzanets	March 25, 1993 (age 32)	1.96	Οutside Hitter
2	Ukraine	Serhii Rudenko	September 2, 1993 (age 32)	1.90	Middle Blocker
3	Ukraine	Ivan Slynchuk	February 9, 1986 (age 39)	1.94	Οutside Hitter
5	Ukraine	Vitalii Shchytkov	November 25, 1991 (age 34)	1.88	Setter
6	Ukraine	Serhii Kushnir	July 2, 1985 (age 40)	1.99	Οutside Hitter
7	Ukraine	Illia Polishchuk	March 28, 1996 (age 29)	1.88	Setter
8	Ukraine	Bohdan Bosenko	January 16, 1997 (age 29)	2.02	Middle Blocker
9	Ukraine	Illia Dovhyi	August 1, 1998 (age 27)	2.00	Middle Blocker
10	Ukraine	Anastasii Ostroumov	March 6, 1985 (age 40)	1.89	Libero
15	Ukraine	Viktor Kraievskyi	January 12, 1994 (age 32)	1.90	Libero
17	Ukraine	Andrii Horbenko	February 10, 1991 (age 34)	2.02	Οpposite
18	Ukraine	Volodymyr Sydorenko (C)	October 5, 1988 (age 37)	2.08	Οpposite
23	Ukraine	Viktor Shchekaliuk	February 17, 1988 (age 37)	2.05	Middle Blocker
96	Ukraine	Kyrylo Klochko	December 9, 1996 (age 29)	1.96	Οutside Hitter

=== Technical staff ===
Technical staff
Head coach	(Ukraine) Viktor Boldariev
Assistant coach	(Ukraine) Ivan Slynchuk

== Notable players ==
Notable, former or current players of the club.

- (Ukraine) Denys Fomin
