= OK Niš =

- Full name: Odbojkaški Klub Niš
- Founded: 1972
- Ground: SC Čair (Capacity: 4,000)
- Chairman: (Serbia) Milan Pešić
- Manager: (Serbia) Dragan Svetozarević
- League: Wiener Staditsche Superliga
- 2019/2020: 2
- Website: Club home page

Uniforms
Home	Away

Volleyball club Niš (Serbian: Odbojkaški klub Niš), is a professional volleyball team based in Niš, Serbia. It plays in the Serbian volley league.

== History ==
Volleyball club Niš (OK Niš) is a successor team of a former volleyball club Student Niš. The club was founded on 24.06.1972. and during that time, the team was a competitor of lower Serbian leagues. Games and practices were conducted at the basketball club Radnički outdoor court, until 1973, when "22. December" Hall was opened.

In the season 1975-1976, volleyball club Niš (volleyball club Student, at the time) won title of 2nd league East champion, and played in promotion play-offs with the winner of the 2nd league South, Rabotnički Skopje. Student won that play-off game with 3-1, and was promoted into the 1st league of Yugoslavia. It was the club's biggest achievement until promotion to Wiener Staditsche Superliga in 2014-2015 season.

Club name was officially changed in 1997.

== 2015-2016 squad ==
Number	Name	Position	Height (cm)	Year of Birth
2	(Serbia) Andrej Rakić	Setter	187	1997.
3	(Serbia) Aleksandar Pejčić	Setter	190	1990.
5	(Serbia) Strahinja Kuburović	Setter	197	1988.
6	(Serbia) Ivan Perović	Outside Hitter	193	1991.
8	(Serbia) Nemanja Jelić	Outside Hitter	195	1996.
10	(Serbia) Milan Stamenković	Opposite	195	1995.
11	(Serbia) Milan Stojković	Middle Blocker	204	1989.
12	(Serbia) Milan Kostadinović	Libero	186	1990.
13	(Serbia) Predrag Pržić	Opposite	194	1987.
15	(Serbia) Milan Mijalković	Middle Blocker	202	1985.
16	(Serbia) Nemanja Opaćič	Outside Hitter	197	1991.
17	(North Macedonia) Darko Angelovski	Libero	180	1994.
18	(Serbia) Aleksandar Ilić	Middle Blocker	190	1993.
19	(Serbia) Dušan Jović	Outside Hitter	190	1997.
