= VC Lokomotiv Kharkiv =

Ukrainian volleyball team

- Full name: Volleyball Club Lokomotiv Kharkiv
- Short name: Lokomotiv Kharkiv
- Founded: 1973
- Ground: Sports Palace "Lokomotiv", Kharkiv (Capacity: 4000)
- League: Ukrainian Super League

Uniforms
| Home | Away |

Lokomotiv Kharkiv (Ukrainian: Локомотив Харків) is a Ukrainian professional men's volleyball team, based in Kharkiv, playing in Ukrainian Super League.

== Achievements ==
=== Domestic ===
- Ukrainian Super League
  (x17) 1994, 1996, 2001, 2002, 2003, 2004, 2005, 2007, 2009, 2010, 2011, 2012, 2013, 2014, 2015, 2016, 2017
  (x4) 1992, 1995, 2008, 2018
  (x1) 2000
- Vyshcha Liha
  (x1) 2019
- Ukrainian Cup
  (x13) 2001, 2002, 2004, 2006, 2007, 2008, 2009, 2010, 2011, 2012, 2013, 2014, 2015, 2016
  (x2) 2017, 2018
- Soviet Championship
  (x1) 1978

=== European ===
- CEV Cup
  - Winner (1) 2003–04

== Season by season ==
Playoff berth

| Season | Tier | League | Finish | Wins | Losses | Win% | Playoffs | Other competitions | Head coach |
|---|---|---|---|---|---|---|---|---|---|
VC Lokomotiv Kharkiv
| 2018–19 | 2 | Higher League | 2nd | 11 | 3 | .786 | – | – | (Ukraine) Serhii Kysil |
| 2019–20 | 1 | SuperLeague | 6th | 9 | 19 | .321 | – | First stage Ukrainian Cup | (Ukraine) Serhii Kysil |

== Team roster ==
Team roster in season 2020-21

Team roster – season 2020/2021
| Shirt No | Nationality | Player | Birth Date | Height | Position |
| 1 | Ukraine | Denys Onyshchuk | May 25, 1994 (age 31) | 1.84 | Οutside Hitter |
| 2 | Ukraine | Yevhen Yehorov | December 21, 1985 (age 39) | 1.90 | Οutside Hitter |
| 4 | Ukraine | Stanislav Samusiev | November 20, 1995 (age 30) | 1.98 | Middle Blocker |
| 5 | Ukraine | Oleksandr Novokhatskyi | January 10, 2000 (age 25) | 1.95 | Οutside Hitter |
| 7 | Ukraine | Dmytro Kozlovskyi (C) | April 26, 1987 (age 38) | 1.90 | Setter |
| 8 | Ukraine | Dmytro Burma | May 25, 1999 (age 26) | 1.94 | Οutside Hitter |
| 9 | Ukraine | Danylo Pashchenko | September 10, 2001 (age 24) | 2.00 | Οutside Hitter |
| 10 | Ukraine | Maksym Hrytsyk | August 12, 2000 (age 25) | 1.90 | Οutside Hitter |
| 11 | Ukraine | Artem Troianovskyi | July 24, 2001 (age 24) | 2.01 | Οutside Hitter |
| 12 | Ukraine | Borys Yakovliev | June 24, 2003 (age 22) | ? | Libero |
| 14 | Ukraine | Daniil Pyvovarenko | January 21, 2004 (age 21) | ? | Οutside Hitter |
| 15 | Ukraine | Maksym Merzlikin | March 8, 1980 (age 45) | 1.97 | Οutside Hitter |
| 17 | Ukraine | Maksym Donets | February 23, 2003 (age 22) | 1.98 | Setter |
| 18 | Ukraine | Ihor Ivanov | July 14, 2001 (age 24) | 1.96 | Οutside Hitter |
| | Ukraine | Arsenii Donets | August 17, 2004 (age 21) | 1.75 | Libero |

Starting lineup in season 2020-21

| Shirt No | Player | Position |
| 4 | (Ukraine) Stanislav Samusiev | Middle Blocker |
| 17 | (Ukraine) Maksym Donets | Middle Blocker |
| 7 | (Ukraine) Dmytro Kozlovskyi | Setter |
| 11 | (Ukraine) Artem Troianovskyi | Οutside Hitter |
| 9 | (Ukraine) Danylo Pashchenko | Οutside Hitter |
| 13 | (Ukraine) Pylyp Harmash | Libero |

=== Technical staff ===
Technical staff
| Head coach | (Ukraine) Serhii Kysil |
| Assistant coach | (Ukraine) Ihor Ziablitsev |

=== Squad changes 2020/2021 ===
==== In ====
- (Ukraine) Pylyp Harmash from (Romania) Știința
- (Ukraine) Dmytro Burma from (Ukraine) Burevisnyk
- (Ukraine) Dmytro Kozlovskyi from (Ukraine) Epicentr-Podoliany
- (Ukraine) Maksym Hrytsyk from (Ukraine) VC MHP-Vinnytsia Trostianets

==== Out ====
- (Ukraine) Yevhen Kapaiev to (Ukraine) Reshetylivka
- (Ukraine) Dmytro Starchikov to (Ukraine) Reshetylivka
- (Ukraine) Yevhen Politko to (Ukraine) MHP-Vinnytsia Trostianets
- (Ukraine) Denys Veletskyi to (Hungary) Kaposvár
- (Ukraine) Stanislav Zalizko to (Ukraine) Pokuttia
- (Ukraine) Pylyp Harmash to (Ukraine) Yurydychna Akademiya

Team roster in season 2019-20

Team roster – season 2019/2020
| Shirt No | Nationality | Player | Birth Date | Height | Position |
| 1 | Ukraine | Dmytro Starchikov | March 29, 1993 (age 32) | 2.05 | Middle Blocker |
| 2 | Ukraine | Bohdan Kiril | April 12, 1995 (age 30) | 2.00 | Middle Blocker |
| 3 | Ukraine | Oleksandr Novokhatskyi | January 10, 2000 (age 25) | 1.98 | Οutside Hitter |
| 4 | Ukraine | Rodion Chmil | October 19, 1979 (age 46) | 1.98 | Οpposite |
| 5 | Ukraine | Artem Antonenko | January 8, 1993 (age 32) | 1.80 | Libero |
| 7 | Ukraine | Pavlo Lyashenko | August 19, 1995 (age 30) | 1.97 | Setter |
| 8 | Ukraine | Vladyslav Palenko | September 14, 1999 (age 26) | 1.96 | Οutside Hitter |
| 9 | Ukraine | Stanislav Zalizko | April 22, 2001 (age 24) | 1.93 | Setter |
| 10 | Ukraine | Yevhen Politko | February 16, 2000 (age 25) | 1.98 | Οpposite |
| 11 | Ukraine | Artem Troianovskyi | July 24, 2001 (age 24) | 2.01 | Οutside Hitter |
| 12 | Ukraine | Ihor Ivanov | July 14, 2001 (age 24) | 1.96 | Οutside Hitter |
| 13 | Ukraine | Danylo Pashchenko | September 10, 2001 (age 24) | 2.00 | Οutside Hitter |
| 14 | Ukraine | Yevhen Kapaiev (C) | September 12, 1984 (age 41) | 1.99 | Οutside Hitter |
| 15 | Ukraine | Denys Veletskyi | January 15, 2000 (age 25) | 2.05 | Middle Blocker |
| 17 | Ukraine | Maksym Donets | February 23, 2003 (age 22) | 1.98 | Setter |
| 18 | Ukraine | Bohdan Tysiachnyk | April 14, 1992 (age 33) | 2.02 | Οutside Hitter |
| | Ukraine | Maksym Drebota | March 2, 2003 (age 22) | 1.95 | Οutside Hitter |
| | Ukraine | Vladyslav Vynohradov | July 18, 2003 (age 22) | 1.91 | Libero |

Starting lineup in season 2019-20
| Shirt No | Player | Position |
| 2 | (Ukraine) Bohdan Kiril | Middle Blocker |
| 15 | (Ukraine) Denys Veletskyi | Middle Blocker |
| 7 | (Ukraine) Pavlo Lyashenko | Setter |
| 10 | (Ukraine) Yevhen Politko | Οpposite |
| 11 | (Ukraine) Artem Troianovskyi | Οutside Hitter |
| 14 | (Ukraine) Yevhen Kapaiev | Οutside Hitter |
| 5 | (Ukraine) Artem Antonenko | Libero |

== Notable players ==
Notable, former or current players of the club.

- (Ukraine) Andrii Diachkov
- (Ukraine) Oleh Plotnytskyi
- (Greece) Dima Filippov
- (Germany) Lukas Kampa
- (Montenegro) Miloš Ćulafić
- (Bulgaria) Georgi Bratoev
- (Belgium) Frank Depestele
- (Venezuela) Andy Rojas
- (Serbia) Zoran Jovanovic
- (Russia) Levan Kalandadze
- (Ukraine) Maksym Drozd
- (Ukraine) Dmytro Teryomenko
- (Ukraine) Ian Iereshchenko
- (Ukraine) Dmytro Viietskyi
- (Ukraine) Timofii Poluian
- (Ukraine) Denys Fomin
- (Ukraine) Yurii Tomyn
- (Ukraine) Volodymyr Kovalchuk
- (Ukraine) Oleh Shevchenko
- (Ukraine) Pylyp Harmash
