= VC Yurydychna Akademiya Kharkiv =

Ukrainian volleyball team

Yurydychna Akademiya
- Full name: Volleyball Club Yurydychna Akademiya
- Short name: Yurakademiya
- Founded: 1995
- Ground: Sports Palace "Lokomotiv", Kharkiv (Capacity: 4000)
- League: Ukrainian Super League
- 2018/2019: 4

Yurydychna Akademiya (Ukrainian: Юридична Академія) is a Ukrainian professional men's volleyball team, based in Kharkiv, playing in Ukrainian Super League.

== Team history ==
In the 1980s, the student team of the Kharkiv Law Institute participated in city, regional, and republican championships among higher educational institutions, becoming a prizewinner and winner of championships among higher educational institutions of the Soviet Union.

In 1992, at the All-Ukrainian Transitional Tournament, it won the right to participate in the first national volleyball championship among the teams of the 1st league masters. At the same time, the team became a farm club of Kharkiv “Lokomotiv” and was named “Yuracademiya — Lokomotiv”.

In 1995, "Yuracademiya - Lokomotiv" took first place in the First League and won the right to play in the Higher League of the Ukrainian Championship. In connection with the new tasks facing the team, on the initiative of the rector of the academy Vasily Tatsiy, the volleyball sports club "Yurydychna Akademiya" was created.

The first president of the club was the vice-rector of the academy for educational and methodological work, Professor of the Department of Civil Procedure Vyacheslav Komarov,. The structure of the club included the volleyball department of the Kharkiv Regional School of Physical Culture No. 2, in which the reserve for the main team of the higher league (now the Superleague) “Yurydychna Akademiya” was prepared in the teams of the second and first leagues.

In December 1999, the club was headed by the Dean of the Faculty of Justice, Associate Professor of the Department of History of State and Law, Candidate of Law Viktor Yermolayev.

== Achievements ==
- Ukrainian Super League
  (x2) 2003, 2004
  (x4) 2001, 2002, 2015, 2016

== Notable players ==
Notable, former or current players of the club.

- (Ukraine) Horden Brova
- (Ukraine) Vladyslav Didenko
- (Ukraine) Oleh Shevchenko
- (Russia) / (Ukraine) Dmitry Muserskiy
- (Russia) / (Ukraine) Nikolay Pavlov
