= 2017 Men's European Volleyball League =

2017 Men's European League
Tournament details
- Host country: Denmark
- Dates: 9–25 June (qualification); 1–2 July (final round)
- Teams: 8
- Venue: 1 (in 1 host city)

Final positions
- Champions: Ukraine (1st title)
- Runners-up: Macedonia
- Third place: Sweden
- Fourth place: Denmark

Tournament awards
- MVP: (Ukraine) Maksym Drozd
- Best Setter: (Ukraine) Volodymyr Kovalchuk
- Best OH: (Ukraine) Oleksiy Klyamar (Denmark) Rasmus Breuning Nielsen
- Best MB: (Ukraine) Maksym Drozd (North Macedonia) Gjoko Josifov
- Best OPP: (North Macedonia) Nikola Gjorgiev
- Best Libero: (Sweden) Anton Wijk Tegenrot

The 2017 Men's European Volleyball League is the 14th edition of the annual Men's European Volleyball League, which features men's national volleyball teams from eight European countries.

A preliminary league round is played from 9 to 25 June 2017, and the final four tournament from 1 to 2 July 2017 at the Gentofte Sportspark in Gentofte, Denmark.

== Teams ==
- Albania
- Azerbaijan
- Denmark
- Hungary
- Israel
- Macedonia
- Sweden
- Ukraine

== League round ==
- All times are local.

=== Pool A ===
Pos	Team	Pld	W	L	Pts	SW	SL	SR	SPW	SPL	SPR	Qualification
1	Macedonia	6	6	0	17	18	3	6.000	511	436	1.172	Final Four
2	Sweden	6	3	3	9	12	12	1.000	534	512	1.043	Final Four
3	Albania	6	3	3	9	12	12	1.000	514	518	0.992	
4	Azerbaijan	6	0	6	1	3	18	0.167	347	425	0.816	

==== Week 1 ====
- Venue: (North Macedonia) SRC Kale, Skopje, Macedonia

Date	Time		Score		Set 1	Set 2	Set 3	Set 4	Set 5	Total	Report
16 Jun	17:00	Albania	3–2	Sweden	15–25	23–25	25–23	26–24	15–9	104–106	Report
16 Jun	19:30	Macedonia	3–0	Azerbaijan	25–19	25–19	25–20			75–58	Report
17 Jun	17:00	Sweden	3–2	Azerbaijan	19–25	23–25	26–24	25–9	15–12	108–95	Report
17 Jun	19:30	Albania	0–3	Macedonia	21–25	16–25	22–25			59–75	Report
18 Jun	17:00	Azerbaijan	1–3	Albania	22–25	22–25	25–17	10–25		79–92	Report
18 Jun	19:30	Sweden	1–3	Macedonia	26–24	17–25	18–25	18–25		79–99	Report

==== Week 2 ====
- Venue: Tirana Olympic Park, Tirana, Albania

Date	Time		Score		Set 1	Set 2	Set 3	Set 4	Set 5	Total	Report
23 Jun	15:00	Sweden	0–3	Macedonia	16–25	22–25	30–32			68–82	Report
23 Jun	18:00	Albania	3–0	Azerbaijan	25–15	25–21	25–19			75–55	Report
24 Jun	15:00	Macedonia	3–0	Azerbaijan	25–20	25–19	25–21			75–60	Report
24 Jun	18:00	Sweden	3–1	Albania	25–22	25–12	23–25	25–23		98–82	Report
25 Jun	15:00	Azerbaijan	0–3	Sweden	18–25	16–25	16–25			50–75	Report
25 Jun	18:00	Macedonia	3–2	Albania	25–21	17–25	25–21	23–25	15–10	105–102	Report

=== Pool B ===
Pos	Team	Pld	W	L	Pts	SW	SL	SR	SPW	SPL	SPR	Qualification
1	Ukraine	6	5	1	14	15	7	2.143	519	446	1.164	Final Four
2	Denmark (Note: Qualified as hosts) (H)	6	4	2	12	14	7	2.000	497	468	1.062	Final Four
3	Hungary	6	2	4	7	9	14	0.643	502	512	0.980	
4	Israel	6	1	5	3	6	16	0.375	434	526	0.825	

(H) Host

==== Week 1 ====
- Venue: Physical Education College, Ivano-Frankivsk, Ukraine

Date	Time		Score		Set 1	Set 2	Set 3	Set 4	Set 5	Total	Report
9 Jun	16:00	Denmark	3–0	Hungary	25–19	26–24	25–21			76–64	Report
9 Jun	19:00	Ukraine	3–0	Israel	25–22	25–20	25–19			75–61	Report
10 Jun	16:00	Hungary	3–1	Israel	22–25	25–15	25–16	25–22		97–78	Report
10 Jun	19:00	Denmark	3–0	Ukraine	25–22	25–22	25–23			75–67	Report
11 Jun	16:00	Israel	3–1	Denmark	18–25	25–22	25–23	25–20		93–90	Report
11 Jun	19:00	Hungary	1–3	Ukraine	25–21	19–25	16–25	22–25		82–96	Report

==== Week 2 ====
- Venue: Continental Aréna, Nyíregyháza, Hungary

Date	Time		Score		Set 1	Set 2	Set 3	Set 4	Set 5	Total	Report
16 Jun	16:00	Israel	0–3	Ukraine	16–25	13–25	15–25			44–75	Report
16 Jun	18:30	Hungary	0–3	Denmark	23–25	23–25	21–25			67–75	Report
17 Jun	15:00	Israel	1–3	Hungary	19–25	25–20	13–25	22–25		79–95	Report
17 Jun	17:30	Ukraine	3–1	Denmark	23–25	25–19	25–21	25–22		98–87	Report
18 Jun	16:00	Ukraine	3–2	Hungary	25–15	21–25	25–21	22–25	15–11	108–97	Report
18 Jun	18:30	Denmark	3–1	Israel	19–25	25–18	25–18	25–18		94–79	Report

== Final four ==
The top placed team from each group and the best second-placed team will qualify for the final four. The fourth participant will be the organizer of the tournament.

Qualified teams

- Denmark (Host)
- Macedonia
- Ukraine
- Sweden

=== Bracket ===
- All times are local
- Venue: Gentoftehallen, Gentofte, Denmark

Semi-finals
1 July
Sweden	2
Ukraine	3
1 July
Denmark	2
Macedonia	3

Final
2 July
Ukraine	3
Macedonia	1
Third place
2 July
Sweden	3
Denmark	1

=== Semifinals ===
Date	Time		Score		Set 1	Set 2	Set 3	Set 4	Set 5	Total	Report
1 Jul	16:00	Sweden	2–3	Ukraine	25–23	19–25	16–25	25–22	16–18	101–113	Report
1 Jul	19:00	Denmark	2–3	Macedonia	25–19	25–20	14–25	20–25	11–15	95–104	Report

=== Third place game ===
Date	Time		Score		Set 1	Set 2	Set 3	Set 4	Set 5	Total	Report
2 Jul	16:00	Sweden	3–1	Denmark	25–23	16–25	25–19	25–21		91–88	Report

=== Final ===
Date	Time		Score		Set 1	Set 2	Set 3	Set 4	Set 5	Total	Report
2 Jul	19:00	Ukraine	3–1	Macedonia	25–15	25–22	24–26	25–13		99–76	Report

== Final standings ==
Rank	Team
1st place, gold medalist(s)	Ukraine
2nd place, silver medalist(s)	Macedonia
3rd place, bronze medalist(s)	Sweden
4	Denmark
5	Albania
6	Hungary
7	Israel
8	Azerbaijan

2017 European League champions

Ukraine
1st title

14-man roster for Final Round
Yevhenii Kisiliuk, Dmytro Storozhylov, Oleksiy Klyamar, Maksym Drozd, Gorden Brova, Volodymyr Kovalchuk, Yuriy Semenyuk, Yuriy Tomyn, Denys Fomin, Oleg Shevchenko, Volodymyr Tevkun, Andriy Levchenko, Kostiantyn Riabukha
Head coach
Uģis Krastiņš

== Awards ==
- Most valuable player
  (Ukraine) Maksym Drozd
- Best setter
  (Ukraine) Volodymyr Kovalchuk
- Best outside spikers
  (Ukraine) Oleksiy Klyamar
  (Denmark) Rasmus Breuning Nielsen
- Best middle blockers
  (Ukraine) Maksym Drozd
  (North Macedonia) Gjoko Josifov
- Best opposite spiker
  (North Macedonia) Nikola Gjorgiev
- Best libero
  (Sweden) Anton Wijk Tegenrot

== See also ==
- 2017 Women's European Volleyball League
