= 2019 Men's European Volleyball Championship =

Tournament details
- Host country: France; Slovenia; Belgium; Netherlands
- Dates: 12–29 September
- Teams: 24 (from 1 confederation)
- Venue: 10 (in 9 host cities)

Final positions
- Champions: Serbia (3rd title)
- Runners-up: Slovenia
- Third place: Poland
- Fourth place: France

Tournament awards
- MVP: (Serbia) Uroš Kovačević
- Best Setter: (France) Benjamin Toniutti
- Best OH: (Serbia) Uroš Kovačević (Poland) Wilfredo León
- Best MB: (Slovenia) Jan Kozamernik (Serbia) Srećko Lisinac
- Best OPP: (Serbia) Aleksandar Atanasijević
- Best Libero: (Slovenia) Jani Kovačič

Tournament statistics
- Matches played: 76
- Attendance: 250,077 (3,290 per match)

The 2019 Men's European Volleyball Championship was the 31st edition of the Men's European Volleyball Championship, organised by Europe's governing volleyball body, the CEV. For the first time the EuroVolley was held in four countries: France, Slovenia, Belgium and Netherlands. The tournament ran from 12 to 29 September 2019. The number of national teams participating in the event was also expanded from 16 to 24.

Serbia won the title over finalist Slovenia in the final held in Paris.

== Qualification ==
Means of qualification	Qualifier	Means of qualification		Qualifier
Host Countries	France	Qualification	Pool A	Romania
Host Countries	Slovenia	Qualification	Pool B	Estonia
Host Countries	Belgium	Qualification	Pool C	Slovakia
Host Countries	Netherlands	Qualification	Pool D	Portugal
2017 European Championship	Russia	Qualification	Pool E	Belarus
2017 European Championship	Germany	Qualification	Pool F	Ukraine
2017 European Championship	Serbia	Qualification	Pool G	Greece
2017 European Championship	Italy	Qualification	Best runners-up	Spain
2017 European Championship	Bulgaria	Qualification	Best runners-up	Montenegro
2017 European Championship	Czech Republic	Qualification	Best runners-up	Finland
2017 European Championship	Poland	Qualification	Best runners-up	Austria
2017 European Championship	Turkey	Qualification	Best runners-up	North Macedonia
Total 24

== Pools composition ==
Montenegro and North Macedonia made their first appearance, whilst Russia was the defending champions. The drawing of lots is combined with a seeding of National Federations and performed as follows:

1. The 4 Organisers are seeded in Preliminary pools. France in Pool A, Belgium in Pool B, Slovenia in Pool C and Netherlands in Pool D.
2. The first and second best ranked from the previous edition of the CEV competition are drawn in different Preliminary pools,
3. According to the CEV National Team ranking list as per 4 September 2017, National Federations are seeded by descending order in a number of cups that equals the number of Preliminary pools.

Pot 1	Pot 2	Pot 3	Pot 4	Pot 5
Russia; Serbia; Poland; Italy	Bulgaria; Germany; Finland; Czech Republic	Estonia; Slovakia; Turkey; Portugal	Spain; Ukraine; Greece; North Macedonia	Belarus; Montenegro; Romania; Austria

Draw

The drawing of lots was held on 16 January 2019 at the Atomium, Brussels, Belgium.

Group A	Group B	Group C	Group D
France	Belgium	Slovenia	Netherlands
Italy	Serbia	Russia	Poland
Bulgaria	Germany	Finland	Czech Republic
Portugal	Slovakia	Turkey	Estonia
Greece	Spain	North Macedonia	Ukraine
Romania	Austria	Belarus	Montenegro

== Venues ==
Pool A	Round of 16 and Quarterfinals	Semifinals and Finals	2019 Men's European Volleyball Championship is located in France
Montpellier, France	Nantes, France	Paris, France	2019 Men's European Volleyball Championship is located in France
Sud de France Arena	Hall XXL	AccorHotels Arena	2019 Men's European Volleyball Championship is located in France
Capacity: 10,700	Capacity: 10,750	Capacity: 15,609	2019 Men's European Volleyball Championship is located in France
	No Image		2019 Men's European Volleyball Championship is located in France
Pool B (13–14 September)	Pool B (15–19 September)	Round of 16 and Quarterfinals	2019 Men's European Volleyball Championship is located in Belgium
Brussels, Belgium	Antwerp, Belgium		2019 Men's European Volleyball Championship is located in Belgium
Palais 12	Lotto Arena	Sportpaleis	2019 Men's European Volleyball Championship is located in Belgium
Capacity: 15,000	Capacity: 5,218	Capacity: 18,400	2019 Men's European Volleyball Championship is located in Belgium
Pool C, Round of 16, Quarterfinals and Semifinals		Ljubljana is located in Slovenia	
Ljubljana, Slovenia		Ljubljana is located in Slovenia	
Arena Stožice		Ljubljana is located in Slovenia	
Capacity: 12,480		Ljubljana is located in Slovenia	
Pool D (13–16 September)	Pool D (17–19 September)	Round of 16 and Quarterfinals	2019 Men's European Volleyball Championship is located in Netherlands
Rotterdam, Netherlands	Amsterdam, Netherlands	Apeldoorn, Netherlands	2019 Men's European Volleyball Championship is located in Netherlands
Rotterdam Ahoy	Sporthallen Zuid	Omnisport Apeldoorn	2019 Men's European Volleyball Championship is located in Netherlands
Capacity: 16,426	Capacity: 2,525	Capacity: 5,000	2019 Men's European Volleyball Championship is located in Netherlands

== Pool standing procedure ==
1. Number of matches won
2. Match points
3. Sets ratio
4. Points ratio
5. If the tie continues as per the point ratio between two teams, the priority will be given to the team which won the match between them. When the tie in points ratio is between three or more teams, a new classification of these teams in the terms of points 1, 2, 3 and 4 will be made taking into consideration only the matches in which they were opposed to each other.

Match won 3–0 or 3–1: 3 match points for the winner, 0 match points for the loser
Match won 3–2: 2 match points for the winner, 1 match point for the loser

== Preliminary round ==
- All times are Central European Summer Time (UTC+02:00).
- The top four teams in each pool qualified for the final round.

=== Group A ===
Pos	Team	Pld	W	L	Pts	SW	SL	SR	SPW	SPL	SPR	Qualification
1	France	5	5	0	15	15	1	15.000	398	303	1.314	Final round
2	Italy	5	4	1	12	13	6	2.167	452	389	1.162	Final round
3	Bulgaria	5	3	2	9	10	7	1.429	396	394	1.005	Final round
4	Greece	5	1	4	3	5	13	0.385	386	432	0.894	Final round
5	Portugal	5	1	4	3	5	13	0.385	386	433	0.891	
6	Romania	5	1	4	3	5	13	0.385	372	439	0.847	

Source: CEV

Date	Time		Score		Set 1	Set 2	Set 3	Set 4	Set 5	Total	Report
12 Sep	14:15	Bulgaria	3–0	Greece	25–22	25–16	25–20			75–58	Report
12 Sep	17:15	Portugal	0–3	Italy	21–25	10–25	22–25			53–75	Report
12 Sep	20:45	France	3–0	Romania	25–19	25–14	25–16			75–49	Report
13 Sep	17:15	Bulgaria	3–0	Romania	28–26	25–20	25–20			78–66	Report
13 Sep	20:45	Italy	3–1	Greece	17–25	25–23	25–19	25–18		92–85	Report
14 Sep	17:15	Greece	0–3	France	14–25	18–25	24–26			56–76	Report
14 Sep	20:45	Bulgaria	3–1	Portugal	25–23	28–30	25–23	25–22		103–98	Report
15 Sep	14:00	Romania	1–3	Italy	15–25	14–25	25–23	14–25		68–98	Report
15 Sep	17:30	Portugal	0–3	France	11–25	20–25	23–25			54–75	Report
16 Sep	17:15	Romania	1–3	Greece	25–23	24–26	25–27	21–25		95–101	Report
16 Sep	20:45	France	3–0	Bulgaria	25–19	25–21	25–14			75–54	Report
17 Sep	14:00	Greece	1–3	Portugal	25–19	21–25	23–25	17–25		86–94	Report
17 Sep	19:30	Italy	3–1	Bulgaria	22–25	25–23	25–21	25–17		97–86	Report
18 Sep	14:00	Portugal	1–3	Romania	21–25	25–19	18–25	23–25		87–94	Report
18 Sep	20:30	France	3–1	Italy	25–22	22–25	25–21	25–22		97–90	Report

=== Group B ===
Pos	Team	Pld	W	L	Pts	SW	SL	SR	SPW	SPL	SPR	Qualification
1	Serbia	5	5	0	15	15	1	15.000	396	313	1.265	Final round
2	Belgium	5	4	1	11	12	5	2.400	386	345	1.119	Final round
3	Germany	5	2	3	7	9	9	1.000	397	394	1.008	Final round
4	Spain	5	2	3	6	9	12	0.750	454	471	0.964	Final round
5	Slovakia	5	2	3	5	6	12	0.500	386	423	0.913	
6	Austria	5	0	5	1	3	15	0.200	360	433	0.831	

Source: CEV

Date	Time		Score		Set 1	Set 2	Set 3	Set 4	Set 5	Total	Report
13 Sep	15:00	Serbia	3–0	Germany	25–21	25–17	25–15			75–53	Report
13 Sep	17:30	Slovakia	3–2	Spain	25–23	25–23	20–25	16–25	18–16	104–112	Report
13 Sep	20:30	Belgium	3–0	Austria	25–17	25–23	25–17			75–57	Report
14 Sep	17:30	Germany	2–3	Belgium	23–25	17–25	25–22	25–15	13–15	103–102	Report
14 Sep	20:30	Slovakia	3–1	Austria	19–25	25–20	25–21	25–15		94–81	Report
15 Sep	15:30	Spain	0–3	Belgium	17–25	21–25	14–25			52–75	Report
15 Sep	18:30	Serbia	3–0	Slovakia	25–19	25–20	25–21			75–60	Report
16 Sep	17:30	Austria	0–3	Germany	23–25	15–25	16–25			54–75	Report
16 Sep	20:30	Spain	1–3	Serbia	25–21	19–25	19–25	20–25		83–96	Report
17 Sep	17:30	Austria	2–3	Spain	23–25	28–26	23–25	25–23	11–15	110–114	Report
17 Sep	20:30	Slovakia	0–3	Belgium	23–25	20–25	15–25			58–75	Report
18 Sep	17:30	Germany	3–0	Slovakia	25–23	30–28	25–19			80–70	Report
18 Sep	20:30	Belgium	0–3	Serbia	19–25	21–25	19–25			59–75	Report
19 Sep	17:30	Spain	3–1	Germany	25–22	25–20	18–25	25–19		93–86	Report
19 Sep	20:30	Serbia	3–0	Austria	25–16	25–22	25–20			75–58	Report

=== Group C ===
Pos	Team	Pld	W	L	Pts	SW	SL	SR	SPW	SPL	SPR	Qualification
1	Russia	5	5	0	15	15	2	7.500	427	329	1.298	Final round
2	Slovenia	5	3	2	9	10	7	1.429	419	376	1.114	Final round
3	Turkey	5	2	3	7	9	10	0.900	413	421	0.981	Final round
4	Finland	5	2	3	6	9	12	0.750	455	472	0.964	Final round
5	North Macedonia	5	2	3	6	7	11	0.636	409	445	0.919	
6	Belarus	5	1	4	2	6	14	0.429	404	484	0.835	

Source: CEV

Date	Time		Score		Set 1	Set 2	Set 3	Set 4	Set 5	Total	Report
12 Sep	14:30	Turkey	1–3	Russia	13–25	25–23	17–25	15–25		70–98	Report
12 Sep	17:30	Finland	3–1	North Macedonia	25–23	25–22	23–25	25–21		98–91	Report
12 Sep	20:30	Slovenia	3–0	Belarus	25–17	25–14	25–19			75–50	Report
13 Sep	17:30	North Macedonia	0–3	Turkey	20–25	23–25	13–25			56–75	Report
13 Sep	20:30	Belarus	1–3	Russia	25–23	17–25	22–25	10–25		74–98	Report
14 Sep	17:30	North Macedonia	0–3	Russia	15–25	16–25	28–30			59–80	Report
14 Sep	20:30	Slovenia	3–1	Finland	25–18	26–24	24–26	25–15		100–83	Report
15 Sep	17:30	Belarus	3–2	Finland	13–25	17–25	30–28	25–22	15–13	100–113	Report
15 Sep	20:30	Turkey	0–3	Slovenia	28–30	16–25	23–25			67–80	Report
16 Sep	17:30	Russia	3–0	Finland	25–17	26–24	25–22			76–63	Report
16 Sep	20:30	Belarus	1–3	North Macedonia	25–23	19–25	27–29	20–25		91–102	Report
17 Sep	17:30	Slovenia	1–3	North Macedonia	24–26	28–30	25–19	24–26		101–101	Report
17 Sep	20:30	Turkey	3–1	Belarus	25–21	26–24	20–25	25–19		96–89	Report
18 Sep	17:30	Slovenia	0–3	Russia	21–25	21–25	21–25			63–75	Report
18 Sep	20:30	Finland	3–2	Turkey	25–20	15–25	18–25	25–23	15–12	98–105	Report

=== Group D ===
Pos	Team	Pld	W	L	Pts	SW	SL	SR	SPW	SPL	SPR	Qualification
1	Poland	5	5	0	15	15	1	15.000	400	283	1.413	Final round
2	Netherlands	5	3	2	10	11	7	1.571	412	383	1.076	Final round
3	Ukraine	5	3	2	9	9	8	1.125	385	367	1.049	Final round
4	Czech Republic	5	2	3	6	9	11	0.818	433	447	0.969	Final round
5	Montenegro	5	2	3	5	7	11	0.636	348	426	0.817	
6	Estonia	5	0	5	0	2	15	0.133	367	439	0.836	

Source: CEV

Date	Time		Score		Set 1	Set 2	Set 3	Set 4	Set 5	Total	Report
13 Sep	14:00	Czech Republic	1–3	Ukraine	21–25	19–25	25–19	22–25		87–94	Report
13 Sep	17:00	Estonia	1–3	Poland	22–25	27–25	22–25	17–25		88–100	Report
13 Sep	20:00	Netherlands	3–0	Montenegro	25–13	25–17	25–15			75–45	Report
14 Sep	16:00	Ukraine	0–3	Netherlands	26–28	27–29	21–25			74–82	Report
14 Sep	19:00	Estonia	0–3	Montenegro	23–25	28–30	23–25			74–80	Report
15 Sep	16:00	Netherlands	0–3	Poland	19–25	18–25	19–25			56–75	Report
15 Sep	19:00	Czech Republic	3–0	Estonia	25–18	34–32	28–26			87–76	Report
16 Sep	17:00	Montenegro	1–3	Ukraine	25–19	18–25	15–25	19–25		77–94	Report
16 Sep	20:00	Poland	3–0	Czech Republic	25–18	25–12	25–15			75–45	Report
17 Sep	17:00	Montenegro	0–3	Poland	10–25	17–25	19–25			46–75	Report
17 Sep	20:00	Estonia	1–3	Netherlands	25–22	19–25	19–25	20–25		83–97	Report
18 Sep	16:00	Ukraine	3–0	Estonia	25–17	25–15	25–14			75–46	Report
18 Sep	20:00	Netherlands	2–3	Czech Republic	18–25	25–18	20–25	25–22	14–16	102–106	Report
19 Sep	17:00	Czech Republic	2–3	Montenegro	23–25	25–14	22–25	25–21	13–15	108–100	Report
19 Sep	20:00	Poland	3–0	Ukraine	25–17	25–16	25–15			75–48	Report

== Final round ==
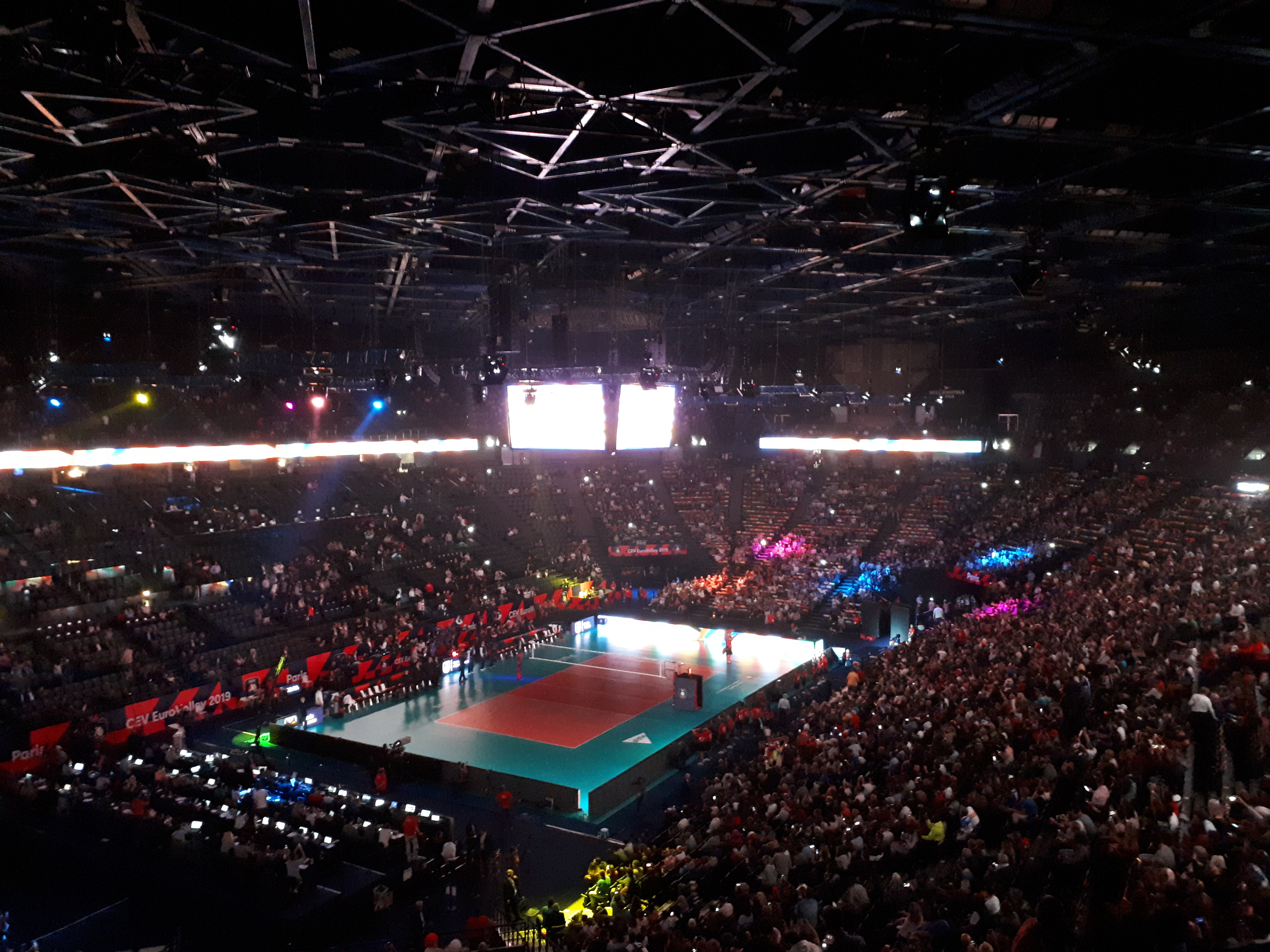
France - Serbia (Semifinals)

- All times are Central European Summer Time (UTC+02:00).

Round of 16
21 September – Antwerp
Serbia	3
Czech Republic	0
21 September – Antwerp
Belgium	2
Ukraine	3
21 September – Nantes
France	3
Finland	0
22 September – Nantes
Italy	3
Turkey	0
21 September – Apeldoorn
Poland	3
Spain	0
21 September – Apeldoorn
Netherlands	1
Germany	3
21 September – Ljubljana
Russia	3
Greece	0
21 September – Ljubljana
Slovenia	3
Bulgaria	1

Quarterfinals
24 September – Antwerp
Serbia	3
Ukraine	2
24 September – Nantes
France	3
Italy	0
23 September – Apeldoorn
Poland	3
Germany	0
23 September – Ljubljana
Russia	1
Slovenia	3

Semifinals
27 September – Paris
Serbia	3
France	2
26 September – Ljubljana
Poland	1
Slovenia	3

Final
29 September – Paris
Serbia	3
Slovenia	1
3rd place match
28 September – Paris
France	0
Poland	3

=== Round of 16 ===
Date	Time		Score		Set 1	Set 2	Set 3	Set 4	Set 5	Total	Report
21 Sep	16:00	Netherlands	1–3	Germany	17–25	22–25	32–30	23–25		94–105	Report
21 Sep	17:30	Russia	3–0	Greece	25–16	25–15	25–16			75–47	Report
21 Sep	17:30	Serbia	3–0	Czech Republic	31–29	25–21	25–18			81–68	Report
21 Sep	19:30	France	3–0	Finland	25–16	25–23	25–21			75–60	Report
21 Sep	20:00	Poland	3–0	Spain	25–18	25–13	25–16			75–47	Report
21 Sep	20:30	Belgium	2–3	Ukraine	22–25	25–21	25–14	18–25	10–15	100–100	Report
21 Sep	20:30	Slovenia	3–1	Bulgaria	25–27	25–17	25–16	25–17		100–77	Report
22 Sep	17:00	Italy	3–0	Turkey	25–22	25–18	25–21			75–61	Report

=== Quarterfinals ===
Date	Time		Score		Set 1	Set 2	Set 3	Set 4	Set 5	Total	Report
23 Sep	20:00	Poland	3–0	Germany	25–19	25–21	25–18			75–58	Report
23 Sep	20:30	Russia	1–3	Slovenia	23–25	22–25	25–21	21–25		91–96	Report
24 Sep	20:30	Serbia	3–2	Ukraine	21–25	25–23	25–22	19–25	15–9	105–104	Report
24 Sep	21:00	France	3–0	Italy	25–16	27–25	25–14			77–55	Report

=== Semifinals ===
Date	Time		Score		Set 1	Set 2	Set 3	Set 4	Set 5	Total	Report
26 Sep	20:30	Poland	1–3	Slovenia	23–25	26–24	22–25	23–25		94–99	Report
27 Sep	21:00	Serbia	3–2	France	23–25	25–23	25–21	17–25	15–7	105–101	Report

=== 3rd place match ===
Date	Time		Score		Set 1	Set 2	Set 3	Set 4	Set 5	Total	Report
28 Sep	18:00	France	0–3	Poland	24–26	22–25	21–25			67–76	Report

=== Final ===
Date	Time		Score		Set 1	Set 2	Set 3	Set 4	Set 5	Total	Report
29 Sep	17:30	Serbia	3–1	Slovenia	19–25	25–16	25–18	25–20		94–79	Report

== Final standing ==
Rank	Team
1st place, gold medalist(s)	Serbia
2nd place, silver medalist(s)	Slovenia
3rd place, bronze medalist(s)	Poland
4	France
5	Russia
6	Italy
7	Ukraine
8	Germany
9	Belgium
10	Netherlands
11	Bulgaria
12	Turkey
13	Czech Republic
14	Finland
15	Spain
16	Greece
17	North Macedonia
18	Montenegro
19	Slovakia
20	Portugal
21	Romania
22	Belarus
23	Austria
24	Estonia

2019 Men's European champions

Serbia
3rd title

14–man roster
Aleksandar Okolić, Uroš Kovačević, Nemanja Petrić (c), Lazar Ćirović, Nikola Peković, Petar Krsmanović, Marko Ivović, Nikola Jovović, Aleksandar Atanasijević, Dražen Luburić, Neven Majstorović, Marko Podraščanin, Srećko Lisinac, Vuk Todorović
Head coach
Slobodan Kovač

== Awards ==
- Most valuable player
  (Serbia) Uroš Kovačević
- Best setter
  (France) Benjamin Toniutti
- Best outside spikers
  (Poland) Wilfredo León
  (Serbia) Uroš Kovačević
- Best middle blockers
  (Slovenia) Jan Kozamernik
  (Serbia) Srećko Lisinac
- Best opposite spiker
  (Serbia) Aleksandar Atanasijević
- Best libero
  (Slovenia) Jani Kovačič

== See also ==
- 2019 Women's European Volleyball Championship
