= VC Barkom-Kazhany =

Ukrainian men's volleyball club

- Full name: Volleyball Club Barkom-Kazhany
- Short name: Barkom-Kazhany
- Founded: 2009; 16 years ago
- Chairman: Oleg Baran
- Manager: Uģis Krastiņš
- League: PlusLiga
- 2024–25: 13th place
- Website: Club home page

Uniforms
Home	Away

Barkom-Kazhany (Ukrainian: Барком-Кажани) is a Ukrainian professional men's volleyball team, based in Lviv, playing in the Polish PlusLiga.

== Achievements ==
- Ukrainian Super League
  (x4) 2018, 2019, 2020, 2021
  (x2) 2017, 2022
- Ukrainian Cup
  (x4) 2017, 2018, 2019, 2021
- Ukrainian Supercup
  (x4) 2016, 2018, 2019, 2020

== Season by season ==
Season	Ukrainian Super League	Ukrainian Cup	Ukrainian Supercup	European competitions
2017–18	Champion	Champion	Runner-up	CEV Cup 1/16 Finals
2018–19	Champion	Champion	Champion	CEV Cup 1/32 Finals
2019–20	Champion	3rd place	Champion	CEV Cup 1/8 Finals
2020–21	Champion	Champion	Champion	CEV Challenge Cup 1/16 Finals
2021–22	Runner-up	Cancelled	Runner-up	CEV Challenge Cup 1/16 Finals

Season	PlusLiga
2022–23	13th
2023–24	12th
2024–25	13th

== Team ==
As of 2025–26 season

=== Coaching staff ===
Occupation	Name
Head coach	(Latvia) Uģis Krastiņš
Assistant coach	(Poland) Kacper Nowicki

=== Players ===
No.	Name	Date of birth	Position
1	(France) Moussé Gueye	November 11, 1996 (age 29)	middle blocker
2	(Ukraine) Illia Kovalov	August 31, 1996 (age 29)	outside hitter
3	(Australia) Lorenzo Pope	December 6, 2001 (age 23)	outside hitter
4	(Ukraine) Oleh Shevchenko	January 8, 1993 (age 32)	outside hitter
6	(Ukraine) Mykola Kuts	May 17, 2006 (age 19)	middle blocker
8	(Poland) Oskar Woźny	April 26, 2005 (age 20)	libero
11	(Germany) Lukas Kampa	November 29, 1986 (age 38)	setter
12	(Ukraine) Vladyslav Shchurov	April 27, 2001 (age 24)	middle blocker
13	(Ukraine) Vasyl Tupchii	January 13, 1992 (age 33)	opposite
14	(Ukraine) Dmytro Vietskyy	February 19, 1998 (age 27)	opposite
16	(Japan) Yamato Nakano	October 2, 1999 (age 26)	setter
19	(Ukraine) Andrii Rohozhyn	July 13, 1997 (age 28)	middle blocker
21	(Ukraine) Yaroslav Pampushko	November 11, 2001 (age 24)	libero
22	(Slovakia) Július Firkaľ	January 14, 1998 (age 27)	outside hitter

== Notable players ==
Notable, former or current players of the club.

- (Ukraine) Yurii Semeniuk
- (Ukraine) Oleh Shevchenko
- (Ukraine) Horden Brova
- (Ukraine) Vasyl Tupchii
- (Ukraine) Maksym Drozd
- (Germany) Lukas Kampa
- (Turkey) Murat Yenipazar
- (Cuba) Christian Thondike Mejías
- (Argentina) Luciano Palonsky
- (Estonia) Märt Tammearu
