= Ukrainian Men's Volleyball Super League =

National men's volleyball championship of Ukraine

- Current season, competition or edition: 2026–27 Ukrainian Men's Volleyball Super League
- Sport: Volleyball
- Founded: 1992
- Administrator: Ukrainian Volleyball Federation
- No. of teams: 8
- Country: Ukraine
- Level on pyramid: 1
- Relegation to: Vyshcha Liha
- Domestic cup: Ukrainian Cup
- International cups: CEV Champions League; CEV Cup; CEV Challenge Cup
- Website: Ukrainian Volleyball Federation

The Ukrainian Men's Volleyball Super League (Ukrainian: Волейбольна Суперліга) is the top men's league of Ukrainian volleyball. It was founded in 1992. It is run by the Volleyball Federation of Ukraine (FVU).

Before, the Ukrainian teams played in the championship of the USSR, founded in 1933. During the seasons 1991/92-1999/00 called the Premier League (Ukrainian: Волейбольна Вища ліга). Between leagues at the end of each season, the teams exchanged - the worst two (one - directly, the second - in the case of unsuccessful performance in the play-off matches) are eliminated in the relegation - they occupy a place of lower league teams.

== Teams ==
Location of teams in 2020–21 Volleyball Super League

Team	City	Arena
Barkom-Kazhany	Lviv	
Burevisnyk	Chernihiv	Chernihiv National Pedagogical University
Sertse Podillia	Vinnytsya	
MHP-Vinnytsia	Trostianets (Vinnytsia Oblast)	
VSC MHP-Vinnytsia	Trostianets (Vinnytsia Oblast)	
Zhytychi Zhytomyr	Zhytomyr	
Lokomotyv Kharkiv	Kharkiv	Sports Palace "Lokomotyv"
Yurydychna Akademiya	Kharkiv	
Epicentr-Podoliany	Horodok (Khmelnytskyi Oblast)	
Pokuttia-Sniatyn-Prybyliv	Sniatyn	

== Ukrainian men's volleyball champions ==
Year	Gold	Silver	Bronze
1992	Shakhtar Donetsk	Lokomotyv Kharkiv	Azot Cherkasy
1992–93	Shakhtar Donetsk	Dynamo Luhansk	Torpedo Odesa
1993–94	Lokomotyv Kharkiv	Lokomotyv Kyiv	Torpedo Odesa
1994–95	Lokomotyv Kyiv	Lokomotyv Kharkiv	Shakhtar Donetsk
1995–96	Lokomotyv Kharkiv	Dorozhnyk-SKA Odesa	Azot Cherkasy
1996–97	Dorozhnyk-SKA Odesa	Azot Cherkasy	Stirol Horlivka
1997–98	Dorozhnyk-SKA Odesa	Dynamo Luhansk	Azot Cherkasy
1998–99	Dorozhnyk-SKA Odesa	Azot Cherkasy	VPS Vinnytsia
1999–00	Azot Cherkasy	Dorozhnyk-SKA Odesa	Lokomotyv Kharkiv
2000–01	Lokomotyv Kharkiv	Azot Cherkasy	Yurydychna Akademiya
2001–02	Lokomotyv Kharkiv	Azot Cherkasy	Yurydychna Akademiya
2002–03	Lokomotyv Kharkiv	Yurydychna Akademiya	Azot-Spartak Cherkasy
2003–04	Lokomotyv Kharkiv	Yurydychna Akademiya	Markokhim Mariupol
2004–05	Lokomotyv Kharkiv	Markokhim Mariupol	Azot-Spartak Cherkasy
2005–06	Azot-Spartak Cherkasy	Krymsoda Krasnoperekopsk	Markokhim Mariupol
2006–07	Lokomotyv Kharkiv	Azot-Spartak Cherkasy	Azovstal Mariupol
2007–08	Lokomotyv Kyiv	Lokomotyv Kharkiv	Impexahro Sport Cherkasy
2008–09	Lokomotyv Kharkiv	Budivelnyk-Dynamo-Bukovyna Chernivtsi	Krymsoda Krasnoperekopsk
2009–10	Lokomotyv Kharkiv	Krymsoda Krasnoperekopsk	Impexahro Sport Cherkasy
2010–11	Lokomotyv Kharkiv	Impexahro Sport Cherkasy	Loko-Ekspres Kharkiv
2011–12	Lokomotyv Kharkiv	Krymsoda Krasnoperekopsk	Favoryt Lubny
2012–13	Lokomotyv Kharkiv	Krymsoda Krasnoperekopsk	Favoryt Lubny
2013–14	Lokomotyv Kharkiv	Khimprom Sumy	Favoryt Lubny
2014–15	Lokomotyv Kharkiv	Khimprom Sumy	Yurydychna Akademiya
2015–16	Lokomotyv Kharkiv	Dnipro	Yurydychna Akademiya
2016–17	Lokomotyv Kharkiv	Barkom-Kazhany	Vinnytsya
2017–18	Barkom-Kazhany	Lokomotyv Kharkiv	Novator Khmelnytskyi
2018–19	Barkom-Kazhany	Sertse Podillia	MKhP-Vinnytsia Trostianets
2019–20	Barkom-Kazhany	MKhP-Vinnytsia Trostianets	Sertse Podillia
2020–21	Barkom-Kazhany	Epicentr-Podoliany	Yurydychna Akademiya
2021–22	Epicentr-Podoliany	Barkom-Kazhany	Prometey Dnipro
2022–23	Prometey Dnipro	Epicentr-Podoliany	VC Yurydychna Akademiya Kharkiv
2023–24	Prometey Dnipro	Epicentr-Podoliany	Zhytychi Zhytomyr
2024–25	Epicentr-Podoliany	Zhytychi Zhytomyr	Ukraine U20
2025–26	Epicentr-Podoliany	Ukraine U20	MHP-Vinnytsia

== Performance by club ==
Team	Wins
Lokomotyv Kharkiv	17
Barkom-Kazhany	4
Epicentr-Podoliany	3
Dorozhnyk-SKA Odesa	3
Prometey Dnipro	2
Impexahro Sport Cherkasy	2
Lokomotyv Kyiv	2
Shakhtar Donetsk	2

== See also ==
- Ukrainian Women's Volleyball Super League
