= 2014 Ukrainian parliamentary election =

- 26 October 2014

423 of the 450 seats in the Verkhovna Rada (Note: 27 seats were in occupied areas where elections could not take place.) 226 seats needed for a majority
- Opinion polls
- Turnout: 51.91% (▼5.52 pp)
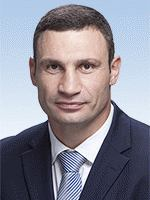

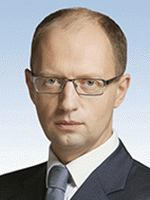

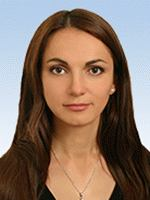

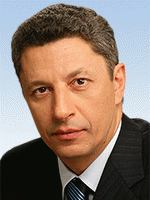

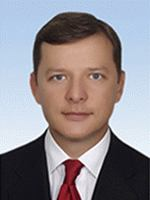

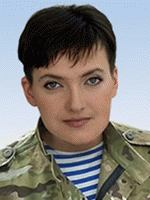

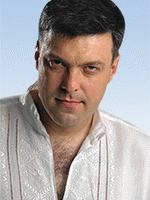
	First party	Second party	Third party
Leader	Vitali Klitschko (Note: Klitschko was only the leader of the Petro Poroshenko Bloc list. The party chairman at that time was Yuriy Lutsenko.)	Arseniy Yatsenyuk	Hanna Hopko (Note: Hopko was only the leader of the Self Reliance list. The party chairman at that time was Andriy Sadovyi.)
Party	Petro Poroshenko Bloc	People's Front	Self Reliance
Leader since	14 September 2014	10 September 2014	12 September 2014
Leader's seat	Party list	Party list	Party list
Last election	New	New	New
Seats won	131	82	33
Seat change	New	New	New
Popular vote	3,437,521	3,488,114	1,729,271
Percentage	21.82% (PR)	22.14% (PR)	10.98% (PR)
Swing	New	New	New
	Fourth party	Fifth party	Sixth party
Leader	Yuriy Boyko	Oleh Liashko	Nadiya Savchenko (Note: Savchenko was only the leader of the Batkivshchyna list. The party chairwoman at that time was Yulia Tymoshenko. Savchenko was in prison in Russia at the time of her election, but was pardoned by the Russian president and exchanged in 2016.)
Party	Opposition Bloc	Radical Party	Batkivshchyna
Leader since	21 September 2014	8 August 2011	14 September 2014
Leader's seat	Party list	Party list	Party list
Last election	New	1 seat, 1.08%	101 seat, 25.55%
Seats won	29	22	20
Seat change	New	▲21	▼81
Popular vote	1,486,203	1,173,131	894,837
Percentage	9.43% (PR)	7.45% (PR)	5.68% (PR)
Swing	New	▲6.38%	▼19.87%
	Seventh party
Leader	Oleh Tyahnybok
Party	Svoboda
Leader since	14 February 2004
Leader's seat	Party list (lost)
Last election	37 seats, 10.45%
Seats won	6
Seat change	▼31
Popular vote	742,022
Percentage	4.71% (PR)
Swing	▼5.74%
Prime Minister before election
Arseniy Yatsenyuk
People's Front
Elected Prime Minister
Arseniy Yatsenyuk
People's Front

Snap parliamentary elections were held in Ukraine on 26 October 2014 to elect members of the Verkhovna Rada. President Petro Poroshenko had pressed for early parliamentary elections since his victory in the presidential elections in May. The July breakup of the ruling coalition gave him the right to dissolve the parliament, so on 25 August 2014 he announced the early election.

Voting did not take place in the Russian-occupied Autonomous Republic of Crimea and Sevastopol, nor in large parts of Donetsk and Luhansk oblasts because of the ongoing war in Donbas. Because of this, 27 of the 450 seats remained unfilled.

The elections were seen as a realignment. Ruling from 2010 to 2014, and taking one of the top two spots in elections since 2006, the Party of Regions did not participate in the 2014 elections, while its informal successor Opposition Bloc received only 9% of the vote. For the first time since Ukrainian independence, the Communist Party of Ukraine failed to win a seat. Four newly created parties received the highest vote shares; the Petro Poroshenko Bloc (formed in July 2014 by Poroshenko's supporters), People's Front (split from Fatherland in August 2014), Self Reliance (registered in 2012) and Opposition Bloc (formed in September 2014 by a group of the former Party of Regions members).

The work of the new parliament started on 27 November 2014. On the same day, five factions formed the "European Ukraine" coalition: Petro Poroshenko Bloc, People's Front, Self Reliance, Radical Party and Fatherland. On 2 December the second Yatsenyuk government was approved.

== Background ==
According to the election law of November 2011, elections to the Verkhovna Rada must take place at least every five years. That law came into effect with the 2012 Ukrainian parliamentary election. If the Rada had sat for the maximum allotted time, the next parliamentary election would have occurred on 29 October 2017. Despite this, the president-elect Petro Poroshenko said that he wanted to hold early parliamentary elections following his victory in the presidential election on 25 May 2014. At 26 June session of the Parliamentary Assembly of the Council of Europe, Poroshenko said that he hoped to hold parliamentary elections in October 2014, portraying this as "the most democratic way". (Note: In a Research & Branding Group opinion poll held from 26 July until 5 August 72% of respondents supported the call for early elections.)

The parliamentary coalition that supported the Yatsenyuk Government, formed in the aftermath of the 2014 Ukrainian revolution and of the Euromaidan movement, was dissolved on 24 July. If no new coalition formed within thirty days, President Poroshenko would become entitled to dissolve the Rada and to call early parliamentary elections. On the same day as the dissolution, the Sovereign European Ukraine faction submitted a bill to the Rada that called for elections to take place on 28 September 2014.

In an interview with Ukrainian television channels on 14 August, Poroshenko justified early elections because the Rada refused to recognise the self-proclaimed breakaway Donetsk and Luhansk People's Republics as terrorist organisations. The two republics, situated in the eastern Ukrainian region of the Donbas, originated in the Donetsk and Luhansk oblasts of Ukraine respectively, and have been fighting Ukrainian government forces in the war in Donbas. President Poroshenko said: "I don't know how to work with a parliament in which a huge number [of deputies], whole factions, make up 'the fifth column' controlled from abroad [referring to Russia]. And this danger is only increasing". He also said that new elections "are the best and the most efficient form of lustration of not only the parliament but also the political forces".

Poroshenko announced on 25 August that he had called for elections to the Rada to take place on 26 October 2014. In his accompanying television address, he portrayed the elections as necessary to "purify the Rada of the mainstay of [former president] Viktor Yanukovych". These deputies, Poroshenko said, "clearly do not represent the people who elected them". Poroshenko also painted these Rada deputies as responsible for "the [January 2014] Dictatorship laws that took the lives of the Heavenly Hundred". Poroshenko also stated that many of the (then) current MPs were "direct sponsors and accomplices or at least sympathizers of the militants/separatists".

== Electoral system ==
The Verkhovna Rada has 450 members, elected to a five-year term in parallel voting, with 225 members elected in single-member constituencies using FPTP system and 225 members elected by proportional representation (closed list) in a single nationwide constituency using the largest remainder method with 5% threshold. Parties are not allowed to form electoral blocs (in contrast to 1998-2007 elections). Attempts to return to proportional representation with open party lists and electoral blocs were failed.

The division into 225 electoral districts was the same as at the 2012 election. Voting was only organized in 198 of them.

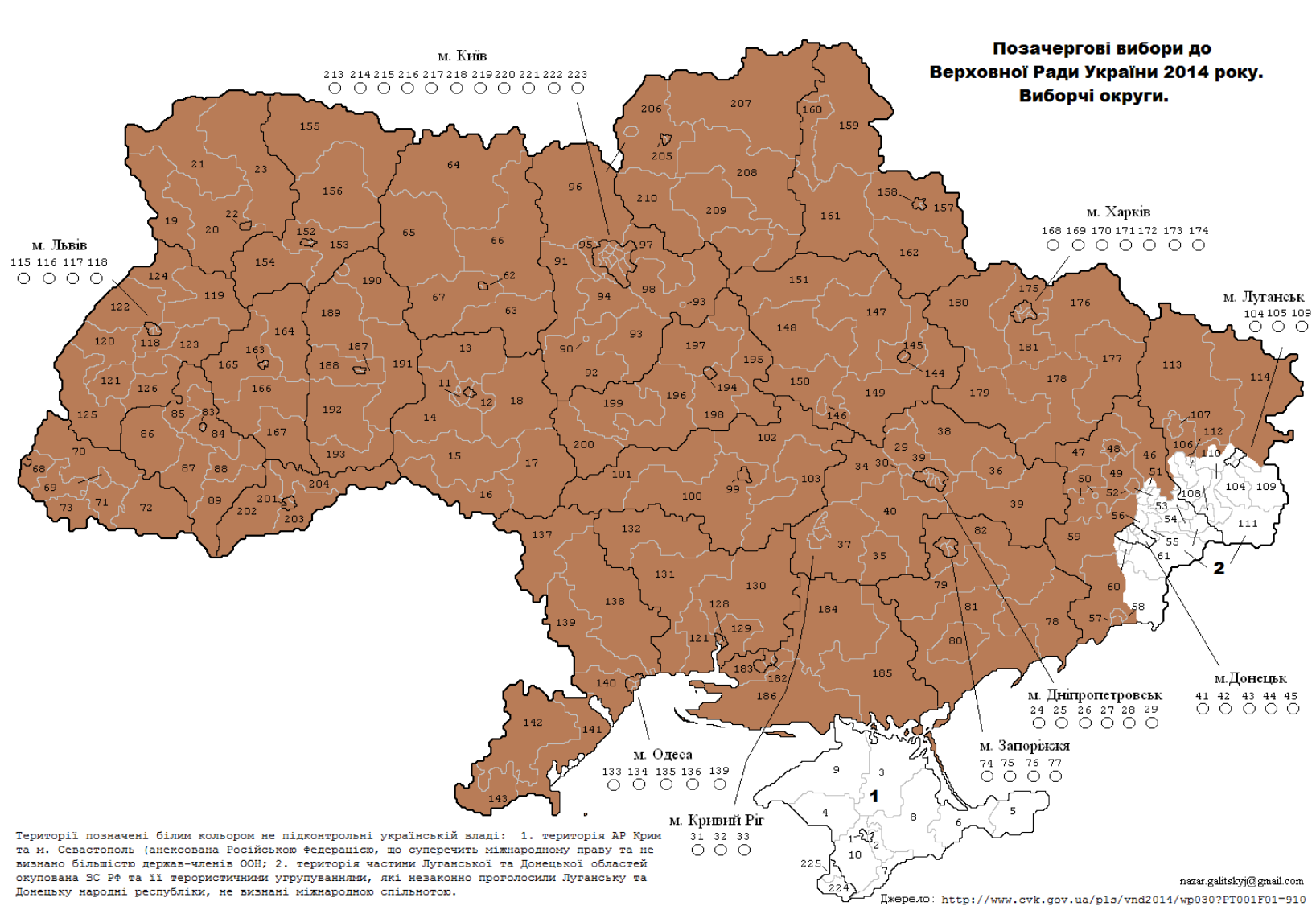
Electoral districts

=== Non-voting areas ===
The voting was impossible to provide on the territories that was not under government control. Particularly, because of Russian occupation of Crimea there was no voting in all 10 districts in Autonomous Republic of Crimea and 2 in Sevastopol. The voting in Donbas was provided partially. The democratic watchdog OPORA estimated that 4.6 million Ukrainians were unable to vote: 1.8 million in Crimea and the city of Sevastopol, 1.6 million in Donetsk Oblast and 1.2 million in Luhansk Oblast.

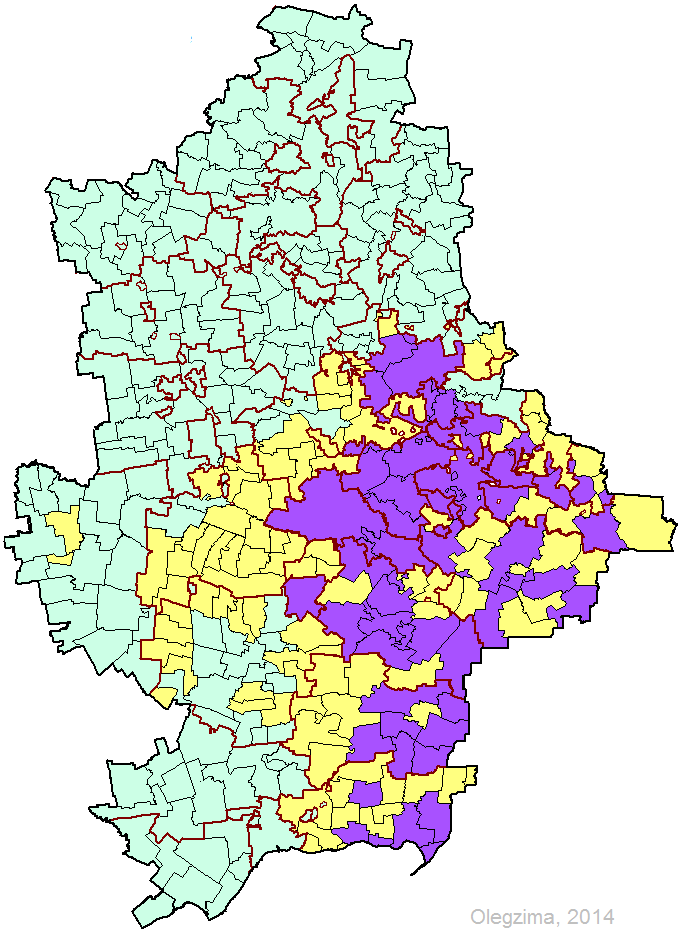
Light green coloured parts of the Donetsk Oblast took part in the Ukrainian parliamentary election, purple coloured parts in the 2 November Donetsk People's Republic elections and yellow parts took part in neither.

==== Crimea ====
About 1.8 million eligible voters live in Autonomous Republic of Crimea and the city of Sevastopol, that is 5% of the whole number of voters in Ukraine. The Ukrainian government lost control over the region in March 2014 during the annexation of Crimea by the Russian Federation. Since that time no legitimate elections are provided there. In the 2014 legislative election Crimean voters had ability to vote in any other region for party-lists in the single nationwide constituency, but they were unable to vote for candidates in single-member constituencies.

==== Donbas ====
"Donbas" is an unofficial name of the two most eastern Ukrainian oblasts: Donetsk and Luhansk. About 5 million of eligible voters live there, that is 14% of the whole number of voters in Ukraine. After an active phase of war in Donbas in the summer 2014 and September ceasefire, roughly a half of the region remained to be controlled by separatists loyal to Yanukovych. On the day before the election, the CEC stated that there was no ability to provide voting in the captured areas. Thus, full-fledged voting was provided only in 8 districts of 32. Other 9 districts were split by the front line for controlled and not controlled areas, so voting was provided there only partly. In 2 of them only slight number of polling station was opened: in 53rd district only 9% of voters were able to vote and in 45th district only 2%. In spite of this, the elections in these single-member constituencies were recognized as successful, and the winners (Oleh Nedava and Yukhym Zvyahilsky) got mandates. To the other 15 districts ballots were not transferred at all.

	Donetsk Oblast	Luhansk Oblast	Total
Districts with full-fledged voting	7	1	8
Districts with partial voting	5	4	9
Districts with no voting	9	6	15

Instead of this election, on the captured territories separatists organized so-called "Donbas general elections" on 2 November, that were a violation of Minsk agreement and were not recognized by the world community.

== Campaign ==
In the 225 electoral districts some 3,321 candidates participated, out of which 2,018 were independent candidates. 52 political parties nominated candidates. 147 candidates withdrew after the 1 October candidate registration deadline.

In the election campaign the parties positions on foreign relations and the war in Donbas could be roughly divided into two groups. The first group consisted of pro-European parties that advocated to end the war in Donbas by use of force and consisted of Fatherland Party, Civic Position, Radical Party and People's Front (this party was ambiguous about use of force). Svoboda also wanted to end the war in Donbas by use of force. The party Petro Poroshenko Bloc was the only pro-European party that wanted to end the war in Donbas by a peaceful solution. The second group was Strong Ukraine and Opposition Bloc who were considered pro-Russian and they advocated to end the war in Donbas by a peaceful solution. The Communist Party of Ukraine (according to political scientist Tadeusz A. Olszański) "effectively supports the separatist rebellion".

According to Olszański Radical Party and the Communists were the only left-wing parties.

=== Registered parties and candidates ===
==== Nationwide party lists ====
On 26 September 2014 the Central Election Commission of Ukraine finished registering the nationwide party lists. A total of 29 parties participated in the election. Parties appeared on the ballot in the following order:

1. Radical Party of Oleh Lyashko
2. Solidarity of Ukrainian Women
3. Internet Party of Ukraine
4. Opposition Bloc
5. People's Front
6. 5.10
7. All-Ukrainian Agrarian Union "ZASTUP"
8. Revival
9. New Politics
10. United Country
11. People's Power
12. Svoboda
13. National Democratic Party of Ukraine
14. Communist Party of Ukraine
15. Self Reliance Party
16. Ukraine is United
17. Right Sector
18. Ukraine of the Future
19. Liberal Party of Ukraine
20. Party of Greens of Ukraine
21. Green Planet
22. Petro Poroshenko Bloc
23. Strength and Honour
24. Congress of Ukrainian Nationalists
25. Strong Ukraine
26. Fatherland
27. Civil Position
28. Bloc of Ukrainian Left Forces
29. Ukrainian Civil Movement

===== Forming of political coalitions =====
On 2 September Vitaliy Kovalchuk (the parliamentary leader) of UDAR stated that since his party and Petro Poroshenko Bloc had agreed to "joint participation in parliamentary elections" on 29 March 2014 the two parties were "in discussion" about "the format" for how to do so in these elections. On 15 September it became clear that 30% of the Petro Poroshenko Bloc election list would be filled by members of UDAR and that UDAR leader Vitali Klitschko is at the top of this list, Klitschko vowed not to resign as incumbent Mayor of Kyiv.

7 September party congress of Civil Position decided that the party would participate in the election on a partly list with members of Democratic Alliance.

On 10 September, the Fatherland Party split because party leaders Yatsenyuk and Turchynov became founding members of the new party People's Front.

The biggest party in the previous 2012 parliamentary elections, Party of Regions, chose not to participate in the election because of a perceived lack of legitimacy (of the election), because not every resident of the Donbas could vote. Individual members of the Party of Regions would take part in the election as candidates of the party Opposition Bloc. According to Yuriy Boyko, who is heading the party's election list, Opposition Bloc does not represent parties, but consists only of individual politicians.

== Conduct ==
The elections were monitored by 2,321 accredited foreign observers, 304 of them on behalf of 21 states and 2,017 from 20 international organisations.

The Ukrainian democratic watchdog OPORA stated about the elections that they were legitimate, but that "the [election] campaign cannot be called fully free within the limits of the country" because of the fighting in the Donbas region. The NGO Committee of Voters of Ukraine asked the Central Election Commission of Ukraine to declare invalid the results of constituencies 45 and 102 because there "significant irregularities were numerous".

The OSCE stated about the elections that they were "in line with international commitments, and were characterized by many positive aspects, including an impartial and efficient Central Election Commission, competitive contests that offered voters real choice, and general respect for fundamental freedoms". European Council President Herman Van Rompuy and European Commission President José Manuel Barroso called the elections "a victory of the people of Ukraine and of democracy". US President Barack Obama and his Secretary of State John Kerry also congratulated Ukraine "on successful parliamentary elections". The day after the election Russian Foreign Minister Sergey Lavrov stated "I think we will recognize this election because it is very important for us that Ukraine will finally have authorities that do not fight one another, do not drag Ukraine to the West or to the East, but that will deal with the real problems facing the country". He also hoped that the new Ukrainian government "will be constructive, will not seek to continue escalating confrontational tendencies in society, (in ties) with Russia". Lavrov's Deputy Foreign Minister Grigory Karasin stated "the election is valid in spite of the rather harsh and dirty election campaign". Karasin also "welcomed the success of parties supporting a peaceful resolution of the conflict in eastern Ukraine" and warned that "nationalistic and chauvinistic forces" in parliament could undermine peace efforts and were "extremely dangerous". Senator Vladimir Dzhabarov, acting chairman of the (Russian) Federation Council's International Affairs Committee, stated that "The contacts earlier established between the State Duma and the Federation Council on the one hand and the Verkhovna Rada on the other will hopefully be re-launched in some format" although he stated he could not imagine how these contacts would be developed since he believed "The new Ukrainian parliament has become more radical-minded". Dzhabarov claimed about the elections that "If such elections had been held in some other country, in Russia for instance, the West would have never recognized them as legitimate. Nevertheless, the West and Europe have recognized the Ukrainian elections as valid". Observers of the Organization of the Black Sea Economic Cooperation were positive about the elections and in particular welcomed that "administrative resources" were not used in the elections. Observers of the International Republican Institute also expressed this opinion and stated that its observers had witnessed only minor non-systemic irregularities that could not have affected the outcome of the election.

== Results ==
The counting of votes was significantly delayed: Central Electoral Commission announced that all ballots were counted on 10 November only. The announcement of the result for 38th electoral district was delayed until mid-November due to the results being challenged in court.

Voter turnout throughout Ukraine.

Voter turnout was much reduced from 2012 (16,052,228 down from 20,797,206). The main reason of this decrease was the impossibility to organize voting in some regions. Because of this, the official turnout was calculated by division by the number of people who live in areas where voting was provided only (according to the CEC, it was 30,921,218). So, the official voter turnout was 51.91%. In any case this percent is smaller than in 2012, when the turnout was 57.43%.

The turnout level had obvious geographical differences. The highest turnout (60-70%) was registered in western regions (except Zakarpattia and Chernivtsi Oblast), the level of turnout in central regions was average (54-58%) and in southern and eastern regions it was quite low (40-48%). The turnout in two oblasts of Donbas (or more exactly in the parts of these oblasts where the voting was provided) was 32% - the lowest in the country.

Previously, the Donbas region displayed high turnout for every election. According to Tadeusz Olszański of Centre for Eastern Studies, The Party of Regions that had plenitude of the power over this region until the 2014 Ukrainian revolution artificially increased voter turnout there. The 2014 election was the end of this artificial increase. One more reason of low turnout in Donbas as well as in other south-eastern regions was a feeling among a significant part of the local population that no party represented their interests.

Party	Proportional			Constituency			Total seats	+/–
Party	Votes	%	Seats	Votes	%	Seats	Total seats	+/–
People's Front	3,488,114	22.14	64	1,461,870	9.64	18	82	New
Petro Poroshenko Bloc	3,437,521	21.82	63	2,896,640	19.11	68	131	New
Self Reliance	1,729,271	10.98	32	161,175	1.06	1	33	New
Opposition Bloc	1,486,203	9.43	27	223,649	1.48	2	29	New
Radical Party of Oleh Liashko	1,173,131	7.45	22	601,022	3.96	0	22	+21
Batkivshchyna	894,837	5.68	17	960,285	6.33	3	20	–81
Svoboda	742,022	4.71	0	358,061	2.36	6	6	–31
Communist Party of Ukraine	611,923	3.88	0	226,176	1.49	0	0	–32
Strong Ukraine	491,471	3.12	0	259,676	1.71	1	1	New
Civil Position	489,523	3.11	0	51,731	0.34	0	0	0
Spade	418,301	2.66	0	134,418	0.89	1	1	New
Right Sector	284,943	1.81	0	156,763	1.03	1	1	+1
Solidarity of Women of Ukraine	105,094	0.67	0	8,649	0.06	0	0	0
5.10	67,124	0.43	0	4,324	0.03	0	0	New
Internet Party of Ukraine	58,197	0.37	0	8,709	0.06	0	0	0
Party of Greens of Ukraine	39,636	0.25	0	4,612	0.03	0	0	0
Green Planet	37,726	0.24	0	19,238	0.13	0	0	0
Revival	31,201	0.20	0				0	0
United Country	28,145	0.18	0				0	New
Ukraine – United Country	19,838	0.13	0				0	New
New Politics	19,222	0.12	0	7,481	0.05	0	0	0
Power of the People	17,817	0.11	0	44,161	0.29	0	0	New
Ukraine of the Future	14,168	0.09	0				0	New
Strength and Honor	13,549	0.09	0				0	New
Civil Movement of Ukraine	13,000	0.08	0				0	New
Bloc of Left Forces of Ukraine	12,499	0.08	0	37,800	0.25	0	0	New
National Democratic Party of Ukraine	11,826	0.08	0	7,243	0.05	0	0	New
Congress of Ukrainian Nationalists	8,976	0.06	0	31,889	0.21	0	0	0
Liberal Party of Ukraine	8,523	0.05	0	36,421	0.24	0	0	0
Ukrainian Platform "Sobor"				38,257	0.25	0	0	0
Democratic Alliance				31,796	0.21	0	0	New
Ukrainian Republican Party				24,845	0.16	0	0	New
Public Power				21,723	0.14	0	0	New
Joint Action				19,343	0.13	0	0	New
Justice				14,284	0.09	0	0	New
People's Party				13,197	0.09	0	0	–2
People's Movement of Ukraine				7,488	0.05	0	0	0
Meritocratic Party of Ukraine				3,032	0.02	0	0	0
Patriotic Party of Ukraine				2,268	0.01	0	0	0
Social Christian Party				450	0.00	0	0	0
Independents				7,282,814	48.03	97	97	+54
Vacant						27	27	–
Total	15,753,801	100.00	225	15,161,490	100.00	225	450	0
Valid votes	15,753,801	98.14						
Invalid/blank votes	298,402	1.86						
Total votes	16,052,203	100.00						
Registered voters/turnout	30,921,218	51.91						
Source: CLEA

=== Party list results by oblast ===
The regional distribution of the proportional vote showed clear differences between the main political forces. The People's Front finished first in 12 oblasts, while the Petro Poroshenko Bloc won seven oblasts and the city of Kyiv. The Opposition Bloc placed first in five oblasts: Dnipropetrovsk, Donetsk, Kharkiv, Luhansk and Zaporizhzhia.

The People's Front was particularly strong in western Ukraine, receiving more than 30% in Chernivtsi, Ivano-Frankivsk, Lviv, Ternopil and Volyn oblasts, and it also won several northern and central regions. The Poroshenko Bloc had a somewhat more geographically even distribution of support, winning in Vinnytsia, Chernihiv, Sumy and Zakarpattia, as well as the southern Kherson, Mykolaiv and Odesa oblasts and the city of Kyiv.

The unexpectedly strong result of the People's Front was widely interpreted as a personal success for Prime Minister Arseniy Yatsenyuk. The Centre for Eastern Studies argued that its result reflected support for Yatsenyuk and for a firmer policy towards the insurgency in Donbas and Russia; Yatsenyuk and Oleksandr Turchynovwere associated with a harder line, while Poroshenko was more closely associated with attempts to reach a negotiated settlement. The People's Front had also emerged from a split in Batkivshchyna and succeeded in taking with it a substantial part of that party's electorate.

The Opposition Bloc won the proportional vote in five eastern oblasts, receiving over 30% in the government-controlled parts of Donetsk and Luhansk oblasts as well as in Kharkiv oblast. It also won in Dnipropetrovsk and Zaporizhzhia, and performed strongly in Odesa and Mykolaiv. The party was composed largely of former Party of Regions politicians and became the principal political force competing for much of that party's former electorate.

Strong Ukraine and the Communist Party displayed a similar east–south pattern but failed to cross the 5% electoral threshold.

Self Reliance performed strongly in western and central Ukraine and especially in large urban areas, receiving 21.39% in Kyiv and 18.78% in Lviv Oblast.

The Radical Party of Oleh Liashko performed particularly strongly in northern and central oblasts. Its electorate was considerably more rural.

Batkivshchyna retained relatively stronger support in parts of central, northern and western Ukraine. Its electorate also remained somewhat more rural than average.

Svoboda remained strongest in western Ukraine, receiving between 6.19% and 8.81% in most Western oblasts. Nevertheless, its national share fell narrowly below the 5% threshold.

More broadly, the election showed both the persistence and the weakening of Ukraine's traditional regional electoral divide: the Opposition Bloc, Strong Ukraine and the Communists remained concentrated in the east and south, while the People's Front, Poroshenko Bloc, Self Reliance, Radical Party, Batkivshchyna and Svoboda competed for different parts of the western and central electorate.

Turnout also showed a pronounced regional pattern. In most western oblasts it ranged from the high 50s to around 70%. In northern and central Ukraine turnout was mostly in the mid-50s. By contrast, it was substantially lower across much of southern and eastern Ukraine, generally ranging from the high 30s to high 40s. The lowest figures were recorded in the conflict-affected Donetsk and Luhansk oblasts, at 32.40% and 32.87% respectively.

Oblast	People's Front		Petro Poroshenko Bloc		Self Reliance		Opposition Bloc		Radical Party		Batkivshchyna		Svoboda		Communist Party		Strong Ukraine		Civil Position		Zastup		Right Sector		Others		Turnout %
Oblast	Votes	%	Votes	%	Votes	%	Votes	%	Votes	%	Votes	%	Votes	%	Votes	%	Votes	%	Votes	%	Votes	%	Votes	%	Votes	%	Turnout %
Cherkasy	151,337	26.79	127,107	22.50	55,534	9.83	15,604	2.76	56,806	10.05	36,376	6.44	33,076	5.85	12,742	2.25	8,881	1.57	26,221	4.64	16,835	2.98	8,584	1.51	15,691	2.78	56.05
Chernihiv	94,014	19.49	103,536	21.46	36,814	7.63	18,729	3.88	79,249	16.42	35,879	7.43	18,674	3.87	16,247	3.36	13,546	2.80	17,598	3.64	28,264	5.85	4,695	0.97	15,117	3.13	56.95
Chernivtsi	107,679	32.39	70,480	21.20	28,474	8.56	9,499	2.85	29,228	8.79	24,789	7.45	16,032	4.82	5,478	1.64	8,846	2.66	7,480	2.25	10,262	3.08	5,195	1.56	8,946	2.69	48.49
Dnipropetrovsk	151,226	12.24	240,594	19.48	106,182	8.59	299,758	24.27	93,850	7.59	57,583	4.66	35,099	2.84	65,426	5.29	47,115	3.81	37,568	3.04	24,261	1.96	26,838	2.17	49,405	4.00	47.86
Donetsk	27,124	6.14	80,474	18.22	17,020	3.85	170,856	38.69	18,314	4.14	8,626	1.95	5,276	1.19	45,304	10.25	37,615	8.51	5,031	1.13	2,491	0.56	4,344	0.98	19,093	4.32	32.40
Ivano-Frankivsk	253,521	37.48	123,441	18.25	99,353	14.69	3,701	0.54	32,824	4.85	41,896	6.19	59,630	8.81	2,520	0.37	3,175	0.46	17,509	2.58	17,064	2.52	12,954	1.91	8,674	1.28	63.73
Kharkiv	77,641	8.13	144,813	15.17	71,506	7.49	307,070	32.16	60,921	6.38	37,118	3.88	19,937	2.08	81,454	8.53	43,499	4.55	27,185	2.84	24,752	2.59	13,085	1.37	45,566	4.77	45.32
Kherson	55,752	16.14	76,889	22.26	23,158	6.70	35,893	10.39	31,045	8.98	19,650	5.68	12,177	3.52	30,776	8.91	21,210	6.14	11,570	3.35	9,855	2.85	4,141	1.19	13,233	3.83	41.36
Khmelnytskyi	160,635	26.09	153,845	24.98	63,972	10.39	13,756	2.23	57,485	9.33	47,124	7.65	33,481	5.43	10,644	1.72	8,643	1.40	14,733	2.39	25,771	4.18	9,305	1.51	16,265	2.64	60.21
Kyiv (city)	222,589	18.70	285,082	23.95	254,658	21.39	43,964	3.69	42,164	3.54	62,153	5.22	84,561	7.10	33,017	2.77	22,622	1.90	51,776	4.35	4,866	0.40	39,218	3.29	43,353	3.64	55.86
Kyiv Oblast	232,688	28.25	199,982	24.28	108,148	13.13	22,065	2.67	56,949	6.91	54,054	6.56	46,517	5.64	13,589	1.65	12,505	1.51	22,141	2.68	12,713	1.54	17,483	2.12	24,557	2.98	57.24
Kirovohrad	96,118	23.66	88,280	21.73	32,106	7.90	28,443	7.00	47,443	11.67	33,910	8.34	16,698	4.11	14,002	3.44	7,365	1.81	12,138	2.98	9,301	2.28	4,659	1.14	15,742	3.88	53.72
Luhansk	8,695	5.94	20,940	14.32	7,519	5.14	53,516	36.59	7,851	5.36	3,412	2.33	2,154	1.47	17,385	11.88	12,825	8.77	2,054	1.40	1,140	0.77	891	0.60	7,840	5.36	32.87
Lviv	450,860	33.03	278,836	20.42	256,369	18.78	9,799	0.71	73,120	5.35	64,634	4.73	84,585	6.19	6,957	0.50	5,816	0.42	60,526	4.43	16,363	1.19	39,614	2.90	17,455	1.28	70.00
Mykolaiv	53,383	14.04	78,491	20.64	29,317	7.71	60,385	15.88	29,577	7.78	17,692	4.65	10,628	2.79	35,038	9.21	25,856	6.80	9,504	2.50	8,291	2.18	4,750	1.24	17,198	4.52	42.81
Odesa	67,355	9.76	135,489	19.63	49,939	7.23	124,562	18.05	37,329	5.41	30,637	4.44	15,880	2.30	61,944	8.97	78,312	11.35	14,098	2.04	30,412	4.40	9,690	1.40	34,321	4.97	39.52
Poltava	147,921	23.33	147,328	23.24	58,443	9.22	33,833	5.33	68,828	10.85	39,457	6.22	29,059	4.58	24,939	3.93	17,348	2.73	19,443	3.06	17,392	2.74	8,465	1.33	21,334	3.37	54.53
Rivne	148,585	29.31	122,748	24.21	56,179	11.08	8,903	1.75	40,111	7.91	33,719	6.65	33,031	6.51	6,124	1.20	8,300	1.63	12,773	2.51	12,001	2.36	10,675	2.10	13,761	2.71	59.59
Sumy	106,948	21.81	123,059	25.09	40,632	8.28	22,778	4.64	52,064	10.61	35,293	7.19	20,793	4.24	20,987	4.28	13,657	2.78	15,885	3.23	15,565	3.17	5,474	1.11	17,144	3.50	54.64
Ternopil	209,569	36.50	113,274	19.73	64,898	11.30	3,548	0.61	37,887	6.59	36,278	6.31	46,979	8.18	1,809	0.31	3,033	0.52	21,133	3.68	13,862	2.41	14,800	2.57	7,033	1.23	68.28
Vinnytsia	163,860	22.41	273,732	37.45	55,499	7.59	16,535	2.26	44,524	6.09	48,312	6.60	31,133	4.25	12,167	1.66	9,267	1.26	18,866	2.58	31,817	4.35	8,174	1.11	17,033	2.33	58.08
Volyn	165,410	33.22	84,119	16.89	57,092	11.46	7,362	1.47	48,325	9.70	37,253	7.48	31,764	6.38	5,974	1.20	7,089	1.42	15,277	3.06	17,851	3.58	8,196	1.64	12,092	2.43	64.85
Zakarpattia	106,469	25.63	116,525	28.05	40,017	9.63	10,048	2.41	28,399	6.83	21,303	5.12	14,589	3.51	5,412	1.30	13,587	3.27	10,781	2.59	25,026	6.02	5,187	1.24	17,934	4.32	44.68
Zaporizhzhia	72,207	10.91	112,052	16.94	56,878	8.59	146,750	22.18	39,219	5.92	30,557	4.61	14,580	2.20	64,510	9.75	47,308	7.15	19,350	2.92	19,951	3.01	8,644	1.30	29,451	4.45	47.19
Zhytomyr	146,240	26.39	127,601	23.03	50,549	9.12	18,298	3.30	58,930	10.63	36,141	6.52	23,053	4.16	16,945	3.05	13,475	2.43	16,961	3.06	22,143	3.99	6,572	1.18	17,142	3.09	56.67
Overseas	10,288	25.38	8,804	21.72	9,015	22.24	548	1.35	689	1.70	991	2.44	2,636	6.50	533	1.31	576	1.42	1,922	4.74	52	0.12	3,310	8.16	1,161	2.86	8.82
Ukraine	3,488,114	22.14	3,437,521	21.82	1,729,271	10.97	1,486,203	9.43	1,173,131	7.44	894,837	5.68	742,022	4.71	611,923	3.88	491,471	3.11	489,523	3.10	418,301	2.65	284,943	1.80	506,541	3.22	52.42
Source: Central Election Commission

Italicised oblasts were only partially under Ukrainian government control, and voting took place only in areas where it could be organised. No voting was held in Crimea or Sevastopol following their annexation by Russia in 2014.

=== By single-member constituency ===
Many deputies elected in single-member constituencies ran as independents. Of the 198 deputies elected in constituency contests, 97 were initially not formally associated with any major party. Many were representatives of local administrative or business networks, including former Party of Regions figures and candidates linked to influential regional businessmen and oligarchic groups.

Winners in single-member constituencies
Region			District^{[District]}		Candidate	Votes %	Party member
No.	Name	No. of mandates	Geographical reference and name	No.	Candidate	Votes %	Party member
1	AR Crimea	10	South-East Simferopol-Tsentralny	001			
1	AR Crimea	10	South-East Simferopol-Kyivsky	002			
1	AR Crimea	10	South-East Dzhankoi	003			
1	AR Crimea	10	South-East Yevpatoriia	004			
1	AR Crimea	10	South-East Kerch	005			
1	AR Crimea	10	South-East Feodosiia	006			
1	AR Crimea	10	South-East Yalta	007			
1	AR Crimea	10	South-East Sudak	008			
1	AR Crimea	10	South-East Krasnoperekopsk	009			
1	AR Crimea	10	South-East Bakhchysarai	010			
2	Vinnytsia	8	Central Vinnytsia (Vyshenka)	011	Oleksandr Dombrovsky	51.37	Petro Poroshenko Bloc
2	Vinnytsia	8	Central Vinnytsia (Zamosttia)	012	Oleksiy Poroshenko	64.04	Petro Poroshenko Bloc
2	Vinnytsia	8	Central Kalynivka	013	Petro Yurchyshyn	44.79	
2	Vinnytsia	8	Central Zhmerynka	014	Ivan Melnychuk	42.37	Petro Poroshenko Bloc
2	Vinnytsia	8	Central Sharhorod	015	Ivan Sporysh	34.04	Petro Poroshenko Bloc
2	Vinnytsia	8	Central Yampil	016	Roman Stadniychuk	21.76	
2	Vinnytsia	8	Central Ladyzhyn	017	Mykola Kucher	47.63	
2	Vinnytsia	8	Central Illintsi	018	Ruslan Demchak	51.68	Petro Poroshenko Bloc
3	Volyn	5	West Volodymyr-Volynskyi	019	Ihor Huz	30.69	People's Front
3	Volyn	5	West Horokhiv	020	Serhiy Matrynyak	35.24	
3	Volyn	5	West Kovel	021	Stepan Ivakhiv	63.49	
3	Volyn	5	West Lutsk	022	Ihor Lapin	24.24	People's Front
3	Volyn	5	West Manevychi	023	Ihor Yeremeyev/Iryna Konstankevych (after by-elections in July 2016)	40.43/57.42	Independent/UKROP
4	Dnipropetrovsk	17	South-East Dnipropetrovsk-Industrialny	024	Yakiv Bezbakh	30.90	
4	Dnipropetrovsk	17	South-East Dnipropetrovsk-Krasnohvardiysky	025	Maksym Kuryachyy	27.90	Petro Poroshenko Bloc
4	Dnipropetrovsk	17	South-East Dnipropetrovsk-Babushkinsky	026	Andriy Denysenko	36.18	Petro Poroshenko Bloc
4	Dnipropetrovsk	17	South-East Dnipropetrovsk-Zhovtnevy	027	Borys Filatov/Tetyana Rychkova (after by-elections in July 2016)	56.66/44.57	
4	Dnipropetrovsk	17	South-East Dnipropetrovsk-Lyeninsky	028	Ivan Kulichenko	33.50	Petro Poroshenko Bloc
4	Dnipropetrovsk	17	South-East Dnipropetrovsk (Yuvileine)	029	Vitaliy Kupriy	29.71	Petro Poroshenko Bloc
4	Dnipropetrovsk	17	South-East Dniprodzerzhynsk	030	Oleksandr Dubinin	26.08	Petro Poroshenko Bloc
4	Dnipropetrovsk	17	South-East Kryvyi Rih-Ternivsky	031	Kostyantyn Pavlov	33.36	
4	Dnipropetrovsk	17	South-East Kryvyi Rih-Dovhynetsky	032	Andriy Halchenko	24.75	
4	Dnipropetrovsk	17	South-East Kryvyi Rih-Tsentralnomisky	033	Kostiantyn Usov	28.43	Petro Poroshenko Bloc
4	Dnipropetrovsk	17	South-East Tsarychanka	034	Oleh Kryshyn	24.16	
4	Dnipropetrovsk	17	South-East Nikopol	035	Andriy Shypko	33.00	
4	Dnipropetrovsk	17	South-East Pavlohrad	036	Artur Martovytsky	50.40	
4	Dnipropetrovsk	17	South-East Kryvyi Rih	037	Dnytro Shpenov	39.02	
4	Dnipropetrovsk	17	South-East Novomoskovsk	038	Vadym Nesterenko	31.35	
4	Dnipropetrovsk	17	South-East Vasylkivka	039	Dmytro Yarosh	29.76	Right Sector
4	Dnipropetrovsk	17	South-East Marhanets	040	Valentyn Didych	27.55	Petro Poroshenko Bloc
5	Donetsk	21	South-East Donetsk-Budyonnivsky	041			
5	Donetsk	21	South-East Donetsk-Voroshilovsky	042			
5	Donetsk	21	South-East Donetsk-Lyeninsky	043			
5	Donetsk	21	South-East Donetsk-Kirovsky	044			
5	Donetsk	21	South-East Donetsk-Kyivsky	045	Yukhym Zvyahilsky	72.73	
5	Donetsk	21	South-East Artemivsk	046	Serhiy Klyuyev	47.47	
5	Donetsk	21	South-East Sloviansk	047	Yuriy Solod	34.17	Opposition Bloc
5	Donetsk	21	South-East Kramatorsk	048	Maksym Yefimov	34.12	
5	Donetsk	21	South-East Kostiantynivka	049	Denys Omelyanovych	27.35	
5	Donetsk	21	South-East Krasnoarmiysk	050	Yevhen Heller	39.54	
5	Donetsk	21	South-East Horlivka	051			
5	Donetsk	21	South-East Dzerzhynsk	052	Ihor Shkirya	41.71	
5	Donetsk	21	South-East Yenakiieve	053	Oleh Nedava	63.63	
5	Donetsk	21	South-East Shakhtarsk	054			
5	Donetsk	21	South-East Makiivka-Hirnytsky	055			
5	Donetsk	21	South-East Makiivka-Tsentralnomisky	056			
5	Donetsk	21	South-East Mariupol-Ilyichivsky	057	Serhiy Matviyenkov	64.16	
5	Donetsk	21	South-East Mariupol-Zhovtnevy	058	Serhiy Taruta	60.00	
5	Donetsk	21	South-East Marinka	059			
5	Donetsk	21	South-East Volnovakha	060	Dmytro Lubinets	48.18	Petro Poroshenko Bloc
5	Donetsk	21	South-East Starobesheve	061			
6	Zhytomyr	6	Central Zhytomyr	062	Boryslav Rosenblat	20.81	Petro Poroshenko Bloc
6	Zhytomyr	6	Central Berdychiv	063	Oleksandr Reveha	29.40	
6	Zhytomyr	6	Central Korosten	064	Volodymyr Areshonkov	41.03	Petro Poroshenko Bloc
6	Zhytomyr	6	Central Novohrad-Volynskyi	065	Volodymyr Lytvyn	41.48	
6	Zhytomyr	6	Central Malyn	066	Pavlo Dzyublyk	19.10	People's Front
6	Zhytomyr	6	Central Chudniv	067	Viktor Razvadovsky	37.19	
7	Zakarpattia	6	West Uzhhorod	068	Robert Horvat	21.58	Petro Poroshenko Bloc
7	Zakarpattia	6	West Mukacheve	069	Viktor Baloha	61.91	
7	Zakarpattia	6	West Svaliava	070	Mykhailo Lanyo	38.75	
7	Zakarpattia	6	West Khust	071	Pavlo Baloha	44.62	
7	Zakarpattia	6	West Tiachiv	072	Vasyl Petyovka	68.04	
7	Zakarpattia	6	West Vynohradiv	073	Ivan Baloha	44.86	
8	Zaporizhzhia	9	South-East Zaporizhzhia-Kommunarsky	074	Petro Sabashuk	27.76	Petro Poroshenko Bloc
8	Zaporizhzhia	9	South-East Zaporizhzhia-Lyeninsky	075	Ihor Artyushenko	29.91	Petro Poroshenko Bloc
8	Zaporizhzhia	9	South-East Zaporizhzhia-Ordzhonikidzevsky	076	Mykola Frolov	21.75	Petro Poroshenko Bloc
8	Zaporizhzhia	9	South-East Zaporizhzhia-Shevchenkivsky	077	Vyacheslav Bohuslayev	53.74	
8	Zaporizhzhia	9	South-East Berdiansk	078	Oleksandr Ponomaryov	48.51	
8	Zaporizhzhia	9	South-East Vasylivka	079	Oleksandr Hryhorchuk	21.94	
8	Zaporizhzhia	9	South-East Melitopol	080	Yevhen Balytsky	47.40	
8	Zaporizhzhia	9	South-East Tokmak	081	Serhiy Valentyrov	24.51	
8	Zaporizhzhia	9	South-East Polohy	082	Vadym Kryvokhatko	36.00	Petro Poroshenko Bloc
9	Ivano-Frankivsk	7	West Ivano-Frankivsk	083	Oleksandr Shevchenko	40.69	Petro Poroshenko Bloc
9	Ivano-Frankivsk	7	West Tysmenytsia	084	Mykhailo Dovbenko	18.26	Petro Poroshenko Bloc
9	Ivano-Frankivsk	7	West Kalush	085	Ihor Nasalyk/Viktor Shevchenko (after by-elections in July 2016)	52.05/21.19	Petro Poroshenko Bloc/UKROP
9	Ivano-Frankivsk	7	West Dolyna	086	Anatoliy Dyriv	22.30	People's Front
9	Ivano-Frankivsk	7	West Nadvirna	087	Yuriy Derevianko	69.67	Volia
9	Ivano-Frankivsk	7	West Kolomyia	088	Yuriy Tymoshenko	29.32	People's Front
9	Ivano-Frankivsk	7	West Sniatyn	089	Yuriy Solovei	23.07	Petro Poroshenko Bloc
10	Kyiv Oblast	9	Central Bila Tserkva	090	Oleksandr Marchenko	23.66	Svoboda
10	Kyiv Oblast	9	Central Makariv	091	Ruslan Solvar	50.96	Petro Poroshenko Bloc
10	Kyiv Oblast	9	Central Uzyn	092	Vitaliy Hudzenko	27.03	Petro Poroshenko Bloc
10	Kyiv Oblast	9	Central Myronivka	093	Oleksandr Onyshchenko	35.77	
10	Kyiv Oblast	9	Central Obukhiv	094	Viktor Romanyuk	32.00	People's Front
10	Kyiv Oblast	9	Central Irpin	095	Mykhailo Havrylyuk	19.43	People's Front
10	Kyiv Oblast	9	Central Vyshhorod	096	Yaroslav Moskalenko	26.28	
10	Kyiv Oblast	9	Central Brovary	097	Pavlo Rizanenko	34.11	Petro Poroshenko Bloc
10	Kyiv Oblast	9	Central Yahotyn	098	Serhiy Mishchenko	40.41	
11	Kirovohrad	5	Central Kirovohrad	099	Kostiantyn Yarynich	37.99	Petro Poroshenko Bloc
11	Kirovohrad	5	Central Bobrynets	100	Stanislav Berezkin	28.02	
11	Kirovohrad	5	Central Holovanivsk	101	Mykhailo Poplavskyi	31.44	
11	Kirovohrad	5	Central Znamianka	102	Oles Dovhyi	29.90	
11	Kirovohrad	5	Central Oleksandriia	103	Anatoliy Kuzmenko	35.52	Petro Poroshenko Bloc
12	Luhansk	11	South-East Luhansk-Artemivsky	104			
12	Luhansk	11	South-East Luhansk-Zhovtnevy	105			
12	Luhansk	11	South-East Severodonetsk	106	Yevhen Bakulin	43.01	Opposition Bloc
12	Luhansk	11	South-East Lysychansk	107	Serhiy Dunayev	37.76	
12	Luhansk	11	South-East Krasnyi Luch	108			
12	Luhansk	11	South-East Krasnodon	109			
12	Luhansk	11	South-East Alchevsk	110			
12	Luhansk	11	South-East Sverdlovsk	111			
12	Luhansk	11	South-East Rubizhne	112	Yuliy Ioffe	48.62	
12	Luhansk	11	South-East Svatove	113	Vitaliy Kurylo	21.40	
12	Luhansk	11	South-East Stanytsia Luhanska	114	Yuriy Harbuz/Serhiy Shahov (after by-elections in July 2016)	25.56/37.62	Independent/Our Land
13	Lviv	12	West Lviv-Sykhivsky	115	Dmytro Dobrodomov	42.10	
13	Lviv	12	West Lviv-Zaliznychny	116	Iryna Podolyak	41.20	Self Reliance
13	Lviv	12	West Lviv-Frankivsky	117	Oksana Yurynets	42.55	Petro Poroshenko Bloc
13	Lviv	12	West Lviv-Lychakivsky	118	Bohdan Dubnevych	43.11	Petro Poroshenko Bloc
13	Lviv	12	West Brody	119	Mykhailo Bondar	26.36	People's Front
13	Lviv	12	West Horodok	120	Yaroslav Dubnevych	60.01	Petro Poroshenko Bloc
13	Lviv	12	West Drohobych	121	Bohdan Matkivsky	23.62	
13	Lviv	12	West Yavoriv	122	Volodymyr Parasyuk	56.56	
13	Lviv	12	West Peremyshliany	123	Taras Batenko	50.89	Petro Poroshenko Bloc
13	Lviv	12	West Sokal	124	Oleh Musiy	29.86	
13	Lviv	12	West Staryi Sambir	125	Andriy Lopushanskyy	32.12	
13	Lviv	12	West Stryy	126	Andriy Kit	30.64	Petro Poroshenko Bloc
14	Mykolaiv	6	South-East Mykolaiv-Zavodsky	127	Borys Kozyr	33.17	Petro Poroshenko Bloc
14	Mykolaiv	6	South-East Mykolaiv-Lyeninsky	128	Artem Iliuk	33.41	
14	Mykolaiv	6	South-East Mykolaiv-Tsentralny	129	Oleksandr Zholobetsky	39.63	Petro Poroshenko Bloc
14	Mykolaiv	6	South-East Bashtanka	130	Andriy Vadatursky	43.75	Petro Poroshenko Bloc
14	Mykolaiv	6	South-East Voznesensk	131	Oleksandr Livik	20.37	Petro Poroshenko Bloc
14	Mykolaiv	6	South-East Pervomaisk	132	Arkadiy Kornatskyy	34.82	Petro Poroshenko Bloc
15	Odesa	11	South-East Odesa-Kyivsky	133	Eduard Matviychuk	24.20	
15	Odesa	11	South-East Odesa-Malynovsky	134	Hennadiy Chekita	38.34	Petro Poroshenko Bloc
15	Odesa	11	South-East Odesa-Prymorsky	135	Serhiy Kivalov	28.80	
15	Odesa	11	South-East Odesa-Suvorovsky	136	Dmytro Holubov	30.31	Petro Poroshenko Bloc
15	Odesa	11	South-East Kotovsk	137	Leonid Klimov	30.88	
15	Odesa	11	South-East Shyriaieve	138	Ivan Fursin	35.01	
15	Odesa	11	South-East Rozdilna	139	Oleksandr Presman	42.54	
15	Odesa	11	South-East Biliaivka	140	Vasyl Hulyaev	29.28	
15	Odesa	11	South-East Tatarbunary	141	Vitaliy Barvinenko	26.66	
15	Odesa	11	South-East Artsyz	142	Anton Kisse	52.96	
15	Odesa	11	South-East Izmail	143	Oleksandr Urbansky	23.76	Strong Ukraine
16	Poltava	8	Central Poltava-Oktyabrsky	144	Serhiy Kaplin	46.30	Petro Poroshenko Bloc
16	Poltava	8	Central Poltava-Kyivsky	145	Yuriy Bublyk	22.60	Svoboda
16	Poltava	8	Central Kremenchuk	146	Yuriy Shapovalov	22.67	
16	Poltava	8	Central Myrhorod	147	Oleh Kulinich	21.19	
16	Poltava	8	Central Lubny	148	Kostiantyn Ishcheikin	22.75	Petro Poroshenko Bloc
16	Poltava	8	Central Karlivka	149	Andriy Reka	25.19	People's Front
16	Poltava	8	Central Komsomolsk	150	Kostyantyn Zhevaho	43.81	
16	Poltava	8	Central Lokhvytsia	151	Taras Kutovy/Ruslan Bogdan (after by-elections in July 2016)	62.86/21.64	Petro Poroshenko Bloc/Fatherland
17	Rivne	5	West Rivne	152	Oleh Osukhovsky	24.51	Svoboda
17	Rivne	5	West Ostroh	153	Yuriy Voznyuk	35.66	People's Front
17	Rivne	5	West Dubno	154	Oleksandr Dekhtyarchuk	21.01	Petro Poroshenko Bloc
17	Rivne	5	West Dubrovytsia	155	Vasyl Yanitsky	28.68	Petro Poroshenko Bloc
17	Rivne	5	West Sarny	156	Serhiy Yevtushok	27.63	Fatherland
18	Sumy	6	Central Sumy	157	Oleh Medunytsia	31.02	People's Front
18	Sumy	6	Central Bilopillia	158	Oleksandr Suhonyako	28.08	Petro Poroshenko Bloc
18	Sumy	6	Central Hlukhiv	159	Andriy Derkach	61.84	
18	Sumy	6	Central Shostka	160	Ihor Molotok	46.15	
18	Sumy	6	Central Romny	161	Mykola Lavryk	21.50	Petro Poroshenko Bloc
18	Sumy	6	Central Okhtyrka	162	Vladyslav Bukharyev	20.26	Fatherland
19	Ternopil	5	West Ternopil	163	Taras Pastukh	35.45	
19	Ternopil	5	West Zbarazh	164	Mykhailo Holovko	35.58	Svoboda
19	Ternopil	5	West Zboriv	165	Taras Yuryk	52.96	Petro Poroshenko Bloc
19	Ternopil	5	West Terebovlya	166	Mykola Lyushnyak	40.48	Petro Poroshenko Bloc
19	Ternopil	5	West Chortkiv	167	Oleh Barna	28.53	Petro Poroshenko Bloc
20	Kharkiv	14	South-East Kharkiv-Dzerzhynsky	168	Valeriy Pysarenko	30.98	
20	Kharkiv	14	South-East Kharkiv-Kyivsky	169	Oleksandr Kirsh	24.71	People's Front
20	Kharkiv	14	South-East Kharkiv-Moskovsky	170	Dmytro Svyatash	34.01	
20	Kharkiv	14	South-East Kharkiv-Frunzensky	171	Vitaliy Khomutynnik	29.79	
20	Kharkiv	14	South-East Kharkiv-Ordzhonikidzevsky	172	Volodymyr Mysyk	54.34	
20	Kharkiv	14	South-East Kharkiv-Kominternivsky	173	Anatoliy Denysenko	42.05	
20	Kharkiv	14	South-East Kharkiv-Lyeninsky	174	Oleksandr Feldman	64.94	
20	Kharkiv	14	South-East Derhachi	175	Volodymyr Katsuba	35.17	
20	Kharkiv	14	South-East Chuhuiv	176	Dmytro Shentsev	54.80	
20	Kharkiv	14	South-East Kupiansk	177	Viktor Ostapchuk	47.70	
20	Kharkiv	14	South-East Balakliia	178	Dmytro Dobkin	33.05	
20	Kharkiv	14	South-East Krasnohrad	179	Anatoliy Hirshfeld	24.23	
20	Kharkiv	14	South-East Zolochiv	180	Oleksandr Bilovol	53.03	
20	Kharkiv	14	South-East Zmiiv	181	Yevhen Murayev	48.95	
21	Kherson	5	South-East Kherson-Suvorovsky	182	Oleksandr Spivakovskyy	21.60	Petro Poroshenko Bloc
21	Kherson	5	South-East Kherson-Komsomolsky	183	Andriy Hordeyev/Yuriy Odarchenko (after by-elections in July 2016)	27.28/25	Petro Poroshenko Bloc/Fatherland
21	Kherson	5	South-East Nova Kakhovka	184	Ivan Vinnyk	18.13	Petro Poroshenko Bloc
21	Kherson	5	South-East Kakhovka	185	Serhiy Khlan	39.04	Petro Poroshenko Bloc
21	Kherson	5	South-East Tsyurupinsk	186	Fedir Nehoi	27.47	
22	Khmelnytskyi	7	Central Khmelnytskyi	187	Serhiy Melnyk	33.37	
22	Khmelnytskyi	7	Central Khmelnytskyi (and vicinity)	188	Serhiy Labazyuk	35.81	
22	Khmelnytskyi	7	Central Krasyliv	189	Andriy Shynkovych	17.99	
22	Khmelnytskyi	7	Central Shepetivka	190	Roman Matsola	30.18	Petro Poroshenko Bloc
22	Khmelnytskyi	7	Central Starokostiantyniv	191	Viktor Bondar	18.61	
22	Khmelnytskyi	7	Central Dunaivtsi	192	Oleksandr Hereha	73.77	
22	Khmelnytskyi	7	Central Kamianets-Podilskyi	193	Volodymyr Melnychenko	33.70	
23	Cherkasy	7	Central Cherkasy-Prydniprovsky	194	Oleh Petrenko	41.15	Petro Poroshenko Bloc
23	Cherkasy	7	Central Cherkasy-Sosnivsky	195	Volodymyr Zubyk	31.26	
23	Cherkasy	7	Central Korsun-Shevchenkivskyi	196	Hennadiy Bobov	30.04	
23	Cherkasy	7	Central Kaniv	197	Vladyslav Holub	34.16	Petro Poroshenko Bloc
23	Cherkasy	7	Central Smila	198	Serhiy Rudyk	21.45	
23	Cherkasy	7	Central Zhashkiv	199	Valentyn Nychyporenko	44.30	
23	Cherkasy	7	Central Uman	200	Anton Yatsenko	57.41	
24	Chernivtsi	4	West Chernivtsi	201	Mykola Fedoruk	34.47	People's Front
24	Chernivtsi	4	West Storozhynets	202	Ivan Rybak	21.28	Petro Poroshenko Bloc
24	Chernivtsi	4	West Novoselytsia	203	Hryhoriy Tymish	28.74	Petro Poroshenko Bloc
24	Chernivtsi	4	West Khotyn	204	Maksym Burbak	24.22	People's Front
25	Chernihiv	6	Central Chernihiv-Desnyansky	205	Valeriy Kulich/Serhiy Berezenko (after by-elections in July 2015)	27.98/35.90	Petro Poroshenko Bloc (both winners)
25	Chernihiv	6	Central Chernihiv-Novozavodsky	206	Vladyslav Atroshenko/Maksym Mykytas (after by-elections in July 2016)	51.34/31.45	Petro Poroshenko Bloc/Independent
25	Chernihiv	6	Central Koriukivka	207	Anatoliy Yevlakhov	37.59	Petro Poroshenko Bloc
25	Chernihiv	6	Central Bakhmach	208	Valeriy Davydenko	38.86	Zastup
25	Chernihiv	6	Central Nizhyn	209	Oleksandr Kodola	26.88	People's Front
25	Chernihiv	6	Central Pryluky	210	Oleh Dmytrenko	27.58	Petro Poroshenko Bloc
26	Kyiv City	13	Central Kyiv-Holosiyivsky	211	Yevhen Rybchynsky	34.39	Petro Poroshenko Bloc
26	Kyiv City	13	Central Kyiv-Darnytsky	212	Vitaliy Stashuk	36.75	People's Front
26	Kyiv City	13	Central Kyiv-Desnyansky	213	Boryslav Bereza	29.44	
26	Kyiv City	13	Central Kyiv-Dniprovsky	214	Viktor Chumak	51.52	Petro Poroshenko Bloc
26	Kyiv City	13	Central Kyiv-Desnyansky (minor Dniprovsky)	215	Andriy Illyenko	39.55	Svoboda
26	Kyiv City	13	Central Kyiv-Dniprovsky (minor Darnytsky)	216	Oleksandr Suprunenko	24.46	
26	Kyiv City	13	Central Kyiv-Obolonsky	217	Andriy Biletsky	33.75	
26	Kyiv City	13	Central Kyiv-Svyatoshynsky (minor Obolonsky)	218	Volodymyr Ariev	63.46	Petro Poroshenko Bloc
26	Kyiv City	13	Central Kyiv-Svyatoshynsky	219	Oleksandr Tretiakov	44.91	Petro Poroshenko Bloc
26	Kyiv City	13	Central Kyiv-Podilsky	220	Vyacheslav Konstantinovsky	32.47	People's Front
26	Kyiv City	13	Central Kyiv-Pechersky	221	Leonid Yemets	37.70	People's Front
26	Kyiv City	13	Central Kyiv-Solomyansky	222	Dmytro Andriyevsky	57.29	Petro Poroshenko Bloc
26	Kyiv City	13	Central Kyiv-Shevchenkivsky	223	Yuriy Levchenko	37.30	Svoboda
27	Sevastopol	2	South-East Sevastopol-Gagarinsky	224			
27	Sevastopol	2	South-East Sevastopol-Leninsky	225			
Notes: District. Electoral districts are not part of the administrative territorial system and may include several territorial units of the Ukrainian regions (raions, cities of regional significance, and others).

== By-elections ==
=== 2015 ===
On 26 July 2015 mid-term election were held in constituency 205 located in Chernihiv. These were necessary after 2014 winner Valeriy Kulich had left parliament because of his appointment as Governor of Chernihiv Oblast. 91 candidates took part in the elections; eight of them for political parties, the others were self-nominated candidates. On election day the ballot paper stretched to about 1 meter. 36 candidates had withdrawn from participation in the elections. During the election campaign top candidates Hennadiy Korban and Serhiy Berezenko were repeatedly accused of bribing voters, the use of black PR and other violations (of the electoral legislation).

The election was won by Berezenko of Petro Poroshenko Bloc with 35.90% of the vote. Second most votes were won by Korban of UKROP who received 14.76%. The official voter turnout was set at 35.3%.

=== 2016 ===
On 17 July 2016 mid-term election were held in 7 single-member districts (constituency 23, 27, 85, 114, 151, 183 and 206) because their representatives had been elected to executive political positions and the death of Ihor Yeremeyev. Turnout varied from about 50% until less than 20%. The elections were monitored by 57 international official observers.

Vote counting in constituency 114 (situated in Stanytsia Luhanska) was disrupted after several members of the election commission refused to count votes. In the same constituency 14 criminal cases for violating the election were opened. Constituency 151 was last in announcing its final results when it did so on 21 July 2016.

17 July 2016 single mandate winners
Region		District^{[District]}		Candidate	Votes %	Party member
No.	Name	Geographical reference and name	No.	Candidate	Votes %	Party member
3	Volyn	West Manevychi	023	Iryna Konstankevych	57.42	UKROP
4	Dnipropetrovsk	South-East Dnipropetrovsk-Zhovtnevy	027	Tetyana Rychkova	44.57	BPP (Note: Although not a member of any political party, Tetyana Rychkova joined the Petro Poroshenko Bloc faction in parliament.)
9	Ivano-Frankivsk	West Kalush	085	Victor Shevchenko	21.19	UKROP
12	Luhansk	South-East Stanytsia Luhanska	114	Serhiy Shahov	37.62	Our Land
16	Poltava	Central Lokhvytsia	151	Ruslan Bogdan	21.64	Fatherland
21	Kherson	South-East Kherson-Komsomolsky	183	Yuriy Odarchenko	25	Fatherland
25	Chernihiv	Central Chernihiv-Novozavodsky	206	Maksym Mykytas	31.45	
