= Demchak =

Demchak (Ukrainian: Демчак) is a gender-neutral Ukrainian surname. Notable people with the surname include:

- Ruslan Demchak (born 1974), Ukrainian politician
- William S. Demchak (born 1962), American business executive
- Brandon C. Demchak (born 1987), American filmmaker
