= Ivan Franko University =

Ivan Franko is considered a great Ukrainian historical figure, and several universities are named after him. Ivan Franko University may refer to:

- Ivan Franko National University of Lviv
- Ivan Franko Zhytomyr State University
