= Valentyn Didych =

Ukrainian politician

- Валентин Дідич
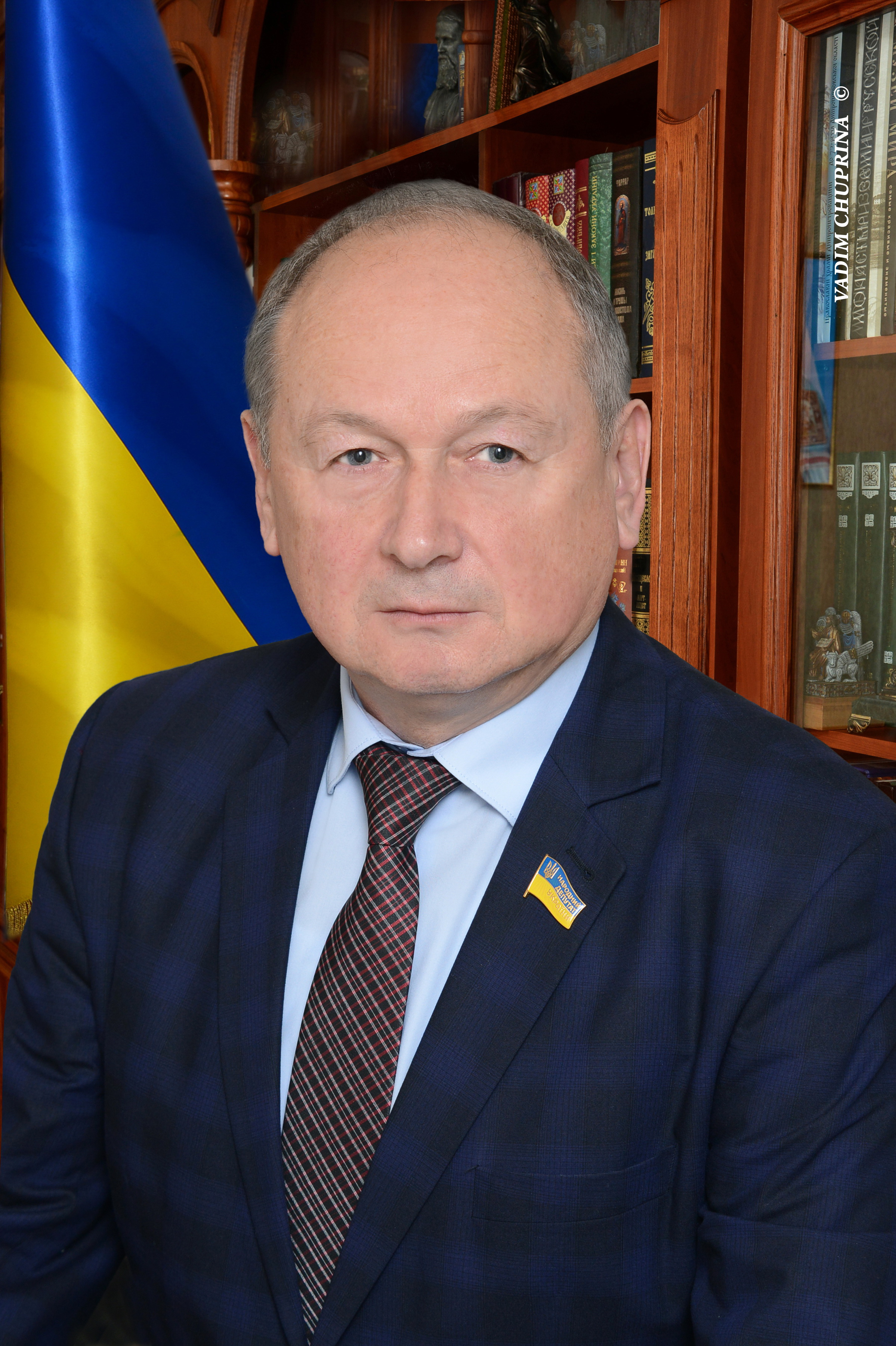
- Didych in 2015

People's Deputy of Ukraine
- In office 27 November 2014 – 29 August 2019
- Preceded by: Oleg Tsaryov
- Succeeded by: Oleksandr Trukhin
- Constituency: Dnipropetrovsk Oblast, No. 40

Personal details
- Born: 11 October 1957 (age 68) Zavadivka, Ukrainian SSR, Soviet Union
- Party: UKROP
- Other political affiliations: Independent; Petro Poroshenko Bloc; Ukrainian Democratic Alliance for Reform (c. 2011–2012); Our Ukraine (2006–2009)
- Education: National Academy for Public Administration under the President of Ukraine

Valentyn Volodymyrovych Didych (Ukrainian: Валентин Володимирович Дідич, born 11 October 1957) is a Ukrainian politician who was a People's Deputy of Ukraine from November 2014 to July 2019, representing Ukraine's 40th electoral district in Dnipropetrovsk Oblast. He was previously chairman of Krynychky Raion from 2005 to 2010.

== Early life and career ==
Valentyn Volodymyrovych Didych was born 11 October 1957 in the village of Zavadivka, Kyiv Oblast, then part of the Soviet Union. He studied at the Uman Agricultural Institute (now the Uman National University of Horticulture), graduating in 1980 with a degree in agronomy. 28 years after graduating from the Uman Agricultural Institute, he earned a degree in state administration from the National Academy for Public Administration under the President of Ukraine.

From 1982 to 1996 he was head of production at the Agro-Industrial Association of Krynychky Raion, later becoming the association's director. He was also director of Dar, a winemaking company, from 1996 to 2005. He served in the Soviet Army.

== Political career ==
From 1994 to 2010, Didych was a member of the Krynychky Raion Council. He was a member of the Our Ukraine party council in the raion from 2006 to 2009, and served as chairman of the raion from 2005 to 2010.

Didych joined the Ukrainian Democratic Alliance for Reform in April 2011. During the 2012 Ukrainian parliamentary election he was a candidate for People's Deputy of Ukraine from Ukraine's 40th electoral district, located in Dnipropetrovsk Oblast. He ultimately was not elected, gathering 10.53% of the vote. He placed behind Oleg Tsaryov of the Party of Regions and Ivan Riazantsev of Batkivshchyna.

Didych ran in the 40th district again during the 2014 Ukrainian parliamentary election, this time as a member of the Petro Poroshenko Bloc. This time, he was successfully elected, winning 27.55% of the vote against Riazantsev's 13.36%.

=== People's Deputy of Ukraine ===
Didych was a member of the Committee on Agrarian Policy and Land Affairs. He left the Petro Poroshenko Bloc in April 2015, becoming an independent before later joining the UKROP party.

Didych has referred to himself as "agrarian" and advocated for the protection of sharecroppers, opposing laws on the sale of land without protections provided to sharecroppers and without the existence of a state-owned bank for farmers. He expressed support for abolishing tariffs on American and European fertilisers in 2017, saying that it would increase competition and reduce prices in the fertiliser market. He has called on the Ukrainian government to sanction Russian chemical fertiliser producers. Didych has expressed opposition to healthcare reforms proposed by Ulana Suprun, claiming that they do not allow paramedical or midwife services to exist. He supports Olha Bohomolets's proposed healthcare reforms as an alternative to Suprun's proposal due to its maintenance of existing healthcare structures.

As a People's Deputy, Didych was accused of piano voting by anti-corruption non-governmental organisation Chesno. Chesno also alleged that his role as a member of the Committee on Agrarian Policy involved conflicts of interest due to his wife's status as the beneficiary of a grain company. Slovo i dilo, a news portal, reported in 2018 that Didych did not contact police about harassment of workers attempting to form a trade union at a DTEK mine in Pavlohrad, after having previously vowed to do so. Anti-corruption monitoring portal Stopcor accused him of bringing financial losses to farmers by supporting a bill abolishing value-added tax on sunflower, soybean and rapeseed exports.

Didych was a candidate in the 2019 Ukrainian parliamentary election in the 40th district. He was not successfully elected, being defeated by Oleksandr Trukhin from the Servant of the People party.
