= Internet Party of Ukraine =

Internet Party of Ukraine Інтернет Партія України
- Leader: Dmitri Golubov
- Founded: February 24, 2009
- Headquarters: Odesa
- Colours: Green and White

Party flag

Website
- www.ipu.com.ua

Internet Party of Ukraine (Ukrainian: Інтернет Партія України, romanized: Internet Partiia Ukrainy) is a political party in Ukraine established in 2007 and registered in April 2010.

Its headquarters is located in Odesa, Ukraine.

== History ==
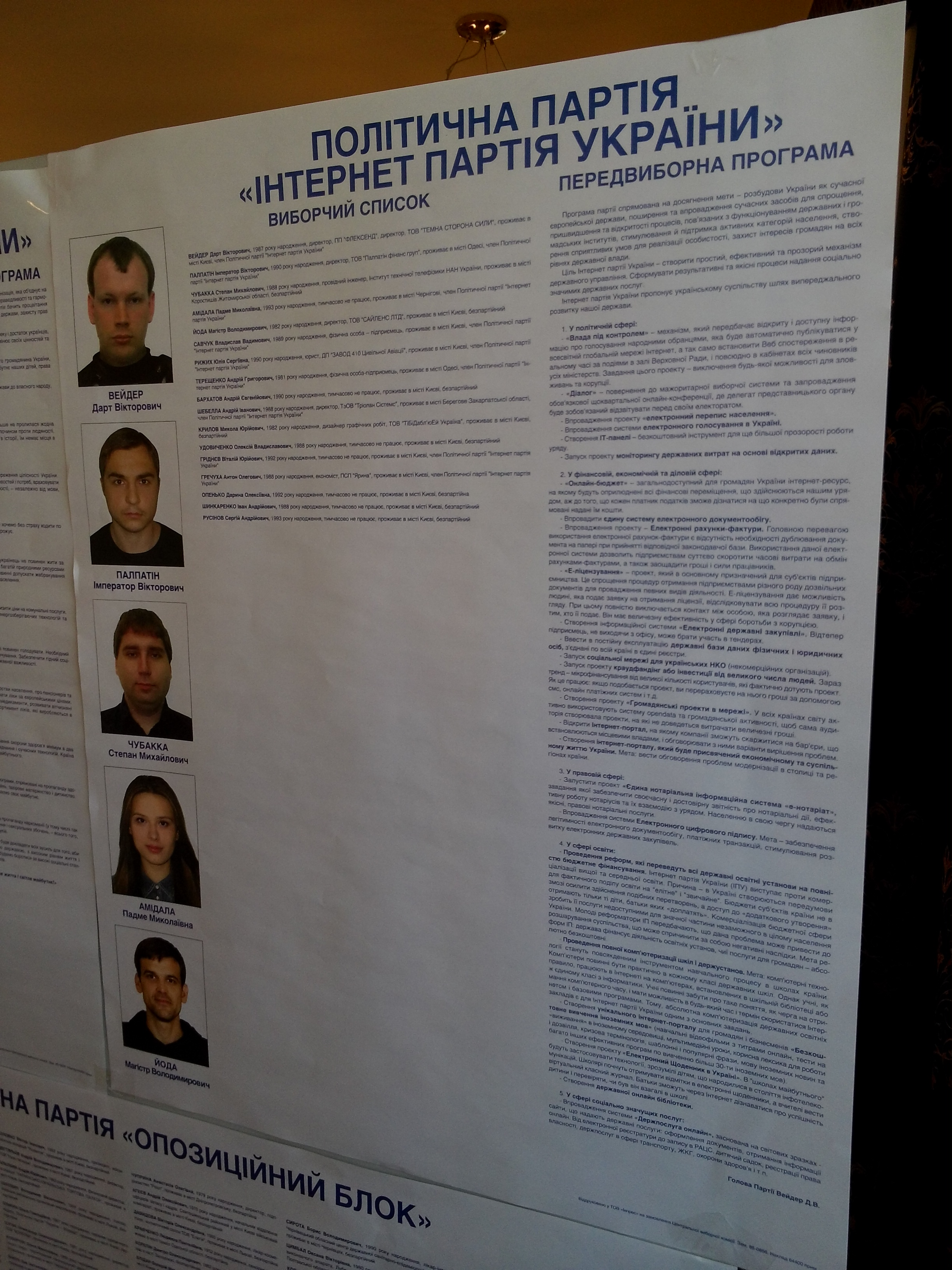
Election list for parliamentary elections in 2014

Founded and led by Dmitri Golubov the party claims to be the first Internet party in the world, its slogan is "electronic government against bureaucracy" and it wants to "create an electronic government in Ukraine".

The party was formed between 2006 and 2007, by the alleged Ukrainian hacker, Dmytro Holubov. The founding congress was held on October 1, 2007. On March 1, 2009 in a hotel complex "Magnolia" in Odesa, was held the first official congress of the party.

The vice-president of the Union of Advocates of Ukraine Petro Boyko and Denys Hrihoryev, world champion from Thai boxing in super-heavyweight are also founding members.

In the 2012 Ukrainian parliamentary election the party competed in/for 1 constituency (seat); but it lost in this one and thus missed parliamentary representation. In the 2014 Ukrainian presidential elections the party tried to nominate a man named Darth Vader; but his registration was refused because his real identity could not be verified.

A man named Darth Vader was a candidate at the 25 May 2014 Kyiv mayoral election and the Odesa mayoral election of the same day for the party. In the 2014 Ukrainian parliamentary election the party let Darth Vader along other Star Wars characters such as Chewbacca, Padmé Amidala, and Yoda run for seats in the Ukrainian parliament. In the election, the party failed to clear the 5% election threshold (it got 0.36% of the votes) and also did not win a constituency seat and thus no parliamentary seats. Party founder Golubov did win a parliamentary seat as a candidate for Petro Poroshenko Bloc constituency 136 located in Odesa with 30.31% of the votes.

On 23 October 2015, a group of Internet Party members, along with their leader, participated in the opening ceremony of the monument to Darth Vader, which was modified as a part of decommunization process by artist Aleksandr Milov from a statue of Vladimir Lenin at the territory of Pressmash plant in Odesa.

In the 2019 Ukrainian parliamentary election the party had 1 candidate in constituency 95 located in Odesa, but he got only 0.15% of the votes (133 votes). In the election Golubov was not reelected in constituency 136, this time as an independent candidate, with 40.92% of the votes (winner Oleksandr Horeniuk of Servant of the People gained 47.08%).

== Purpose ==
The political power tends to create attractive investment conditions in Ukraine and reach a new level of economic development and technology, its purpose is:

- Computerization of the entire country
- Elimination of bureaucracy in its negative sense
- Transition to digital media and away from paperwork
- Free PC courses and foreign languages for all citizens of Ukraine due to budget
- Seven taxes instead of 98
- Single income tax of 25%
- Abolition of VAT
- Ban on sale of GMO products in Ukraine
- Establishment of offshore zones in Ukraine
- Withdrawal from the FATF
