= Klymentii Konyk =

Ukrainian military officer and Soviet educator (1888–1937)

Klym Konyk
- Клим Йосипович Коник
- Klym Konyk
- Born: 27 October 1888; Posada Sanocka, Kingdom of Galicia and Lodomeria, Austria-Hungary (now Sanok, Poland)
- Died: 3 November 1937 (aged 49); Sandarmokh, Karelian ASSR, Russian SFSR, Soviet Union
- Education: University of Vienna
- Military career
- Allegiance: Austria-Hungary; West Ukrainian People's Republic; Soviet Union
- Branch: Ukrainian Sich Riflemen; Ukrainian Galician Army; Red Ukrainian Galician Army; Red Army
- Rank: Pidkhorunzhyi (USS); Khorunzhyi (UHA)
- Commands: Deputy platoon commander, 1st Regiment of the Ukrainian Sich Riflemen (1914–1918); Commander of the field gendarmerie unit in Drohobych (1919); Machine-gun company commander, 44th Rifle Division (1919–1920)
- Conflicts: World War I (Battle of Makivka, Battle of Lysonia, Battle of Koniuchy); Polish–Ukrainian War (Drohobych revolt); Polish–Soviet War
- Awards: Military Merit Cross (3rd Class)

Klym Yosypovych Konyk (Ukrainian: Клим Йосипович Коник; 27 October 1888 – 3 November 1937) was a Ukrainian military officer, journalist, economist, and Soviet educational administrator. He served in the Ukrainian Sich Riflemen, the Ukrainian Galician Army, and the Red Army, and later headed higher education institutions in the Ukrainian Soviet Socialist Republic before being executed during the Great Purge.

== Biography ==
=== Early life and education ===
Konyk was born on 27 October 1888 in the village of Posada Sanocka near Sanok in Galicia (then part of Austria-Hungary). His father, Yosyp Konyk, worked as a clerk at the district court, and his mother, Maria-Istsylia (née Margulis), came from a Jewish family and later converted to Greek Catholicism. He had four brothers, including Erast Konyk (who also became an officer in the Ukrainian Sich Riflemen), and one sister.

He attended elementary schools in Sanok and Berezhany, and later graduated from the Berezhany Gymnasium and the Academic Gymnasium of Lviv. Konyk enrolled in the Faculty of Law at University of Lviv. In July 1910, he participated in student demonstrations against the Polonization of the university, during which Ukrainian student Adam Kotsko was killed. Following the clashes, Konyk was arrested along with over a hundred other students, spent three and a half months in prison, and was expelled from the university. He subsequently continued his legal studies at the University of Vienna, graduating in 1914 with a specialization in international law.

=== Military service ===
At the outbreak of World War I in 1914, Konyk joined the Ukrainian Sich Riflemen (USS) within the Austro-Hungarian Army. By January 1916, he held the rank of pidkhorunzhyi (ensign) and served as deputy platoon commander in the 2nd Company of the 1st USS Regiment. He was wounded in action near Berezhany and at the Battle of Lysonia in 1916, and again at the Battle of Koniuchy in 1917. In 1916–1917, he also worked as a teacher in Ukrainian elementary schools established by the Sich Riflemen in Volhynia, specifically in the village of Puziv near Volodymyr-Volynskyi.

From November 1918 to August 1919, Konyk served in the Ukrainian Galician Army (UHA) during the Polish–Ukrainian War. In April 1919, he commanded a field gendarmerie unit that suppressed the Drohobych revolt and restored order in Drohobych. Following the alliance between the UHA and the Bolsheviks in early 1920, he joined the Red Ukrainian Galician Army and later served in the 44th Rifle Division of the Red Army as a machine-gun company commander, senior investigator of the Special Department, and secretary of the divisional newspaper Shliakh chervonoarmiitsia.

=== Academic and administrative career in Soviet Ukraine ===
In May 1921, Konyk began working in cultural and educational institutions in Zhytomyr. He headed the local state publishing house, collaborated with regional newspapers, and led the Zhytomyr Governorate Department of Education. In 1925, he was appointed rector and lecturer in social sciences at the Volhynian Institute of Public Education (now Zhytomyr Ivan Franko State University).

In February 1928, Konyk became rector of the Odesa Institute of National Economy. During his tenure, the institution transitioned from a three-year to a four-year curriculum and incorporated a local industrial and commercial technical school. Later in 1928, he was transferred to Kharkiv to serve as deputy head of the Department of Scientific Institutions at the People's Commissariat of Education of the Ukrainian SSR, and subsequently headed the science planning sector at the State Planning Committee (Derzhplan) of the Ukrainian SSR. In his 1931 monograph Plianuvannia nauky na Ukraini (Planning of Science in Ukraine), he advocated for subordinating academic research to Soviet five-year economic plans.

=== Arrest and execution ===
On 5 May 1933, Konyk was arrested in Kharkiv by the Soviet secret police on fabricated charges of belonging to the Ukrainian Military Organization (UVO) and espionage on behalf of Poland. He was sentenced to five years in a corrective labor camp and sent to the Solovki prison camp.

In October 1937, an NKVD troika of the Leningrad Oblast reviewed his case and sentenced him to death along with 133 other Ukrainian prisoners. Konyk was executed by shooting on 3 November 1937 at Sandarmokh in Karelia. He was posthumously rehabilitated in 1956.

== Works ==
- Plianuvannia nauky na Ukraini (Planning of Science in Ukraine), Kharkiv: Hospodarstvo Ukrainy, 1931.
