= Erast Konyk =

Ukrainian military officer (1886–after 1960s)

- Ераст Йосипович Коник
- Born: 22 November 1886; Przemyśl, Austria-Hungary
- Died: after 1960s Lviv, Ukrainian SSR
- Education: University of Lviv
- Military career
- Allegiance: Austria-Hungary; West Ukrainian People's Republic; Ukrainian People's Republic; Ukrainian Soviet Socialist Republic
- Branch: Austro-Hungarian Army; Ukrainian Galician Army; Red Ukrainian Galician Army
- Rank: Chetar (Second lieutenant)
- Units: 80th Infantry Regiment (Austria-Hungary); Ukrainian Sich Riflemen; 4th Zolochiv Brigade (UHA); 9th Belz Brigade (UHA); 2nd Brigade (ChUHA)
- Commands: Acting Company Commander, Ukrainian Sich Riflemen (1914); Platoon Commander, Budzynovskyi's Company, Ukrainian Sich Riflemen (1914–1915); Commander, 11th Infantry Company, 4th Zolochiv Brigade (1918–1919)
- Conflicts: World War I; Eastern Front; Battle of Mount Kobyla; Carpathian Winter War; Polish–Ukrainian War; November Uprising; Battle of Lviv; Chortkiv offensive; Ukrainian–Soviet War
- Awards: 1912–1913 Mobilization Cross

Erast Yosypovych Konyk (Ukrainian: Ераст Йосипович Коник; 22 November 1886 – after 1960s) was a Ukrainian military officer who served in the Austro-Hungarian Army, the Ukrainian Sich Riflemen (USS), the Ukrainian Galician Army (UHA), and the Red Ukrainian Galician Army (ChUHA). He participated in World War I, the Polish–Ukrainian War, and the Ukrainian–Soviet War, holding the rank of chetar (second lieutenant) in the UHA.

== Early life and education ==
Konyk was born on 22 November 1886 in Przemyśl into the family of Yosyf Konyk, a court clerk, and Mariia-Istsyliia (née Margulis), who was of Jewish origin and converted to Greek Catholicism. He was the eldest of six children. His younger brother Klymentii Konyk also became a Ukrainian military officer and later a Soviet official.

Konyk attended gymnasiums in Sanok, Berezhany, and Lviv. In October 1906, he enrolled in the Faculty of Law and Political Science at the University of Lviv (then Francis I University), studying until 1910. During his studies, he participated in the Ukrainian student movement advocating for a separate Ukrainian university in Lviv, including the protests of 1910.

In late 1910, Konyk enlisted as a one-year volunteer in the Austro-Hungarian 80th Infantry Regiment stationed in Zolochiv, reaching the rank of cadet-aspirant in January 1912. Following a disciplinary inquiry in 1913 while stationed in Nevesinje, he was discharged to the reserves without his cadet rank and returned to Lviv, where he joined the paramilitary society "Sich Riflemen II" led by Roman Dashkevych.

== World War I and Ukrainian Sich Riflemen ==
Upon the outbreak of World War I in August 1914, Konyk joined the Ukrainian Sich Riflemen (USS), initially assisting with recruitment in the Stanyslaviv district before serving as an acting company commander. In September 1914, alongside Legion commander Mykhailo Halushchynskyi, he opposed Austro-Hungarian plans to break up the riflemen companies into small reconnaissance detachments, which were subsequently abandoned after heavy losses.

Following the October 1914 reorganization of the Legion, Konyk was appointed platoon commander (chetar) in Osyp Budzynovskyi's company. In late October 1914, he commanded a sector of the defense during the Battle of Mount Kobyla near Boryslav and subsequently fought at the Verecke Pass. In March 1915, he left the Legion for the Austro-Hungarian 55th Infantry Regiment. Due to rheumatism, a medical commission in Bruck an der Leitha reassigned him in October 1915 to the accounting service of the Northern Military Railway.

== Ukrainian Galician Army ==
Following the November Uprising in Lviv, Konyk joined the Ukrainian Galician Army (UHA) on 20 November 1918. In December 1918, he received the rank of khorunzhyi (ensign) in Zolochiv and took command of the 11th Infantry Company within the 4th Zolochiv Brigade.

In early 1919, he served as adjutant to Lieutenant Romaniuk—participating in truce negotiations with besieged Polish forces in Belz in February 1919—and later became a staff officer in the 9th Belz Brigade under Bohuslav Shashkevych. He fought on the Northern Front around Lviv, Zhovkva, Dobrosyn, and Zbarazh. On 1 August 1919, Dictator Yevhen Petrushevych promoted him to the rank of chetar.

After the UHA crossed the Zbruch River in October 1919, Konyk served in the army's counterintelligence (defensive) service until March 1920, before joining the staff of the 2nd Brigade of the Red Ukrainian Galician Army (ChUHA) under Yulian Holovinskyi. When the 2nd and 3rd ChUHA brigades broke with Soviet command in April 1920, Konyk supported the uprising and was subsequently captured and interned by Polish forces.

== Later life ==
Konyk returned to Lviv in early 1921. In the interwar period, he worked as a candidate for the bar (kandydat adwokacki). On 30 October 1932, he married Mariia-Vanda Bliumer (widow of Stanisław Jasiński) at St. Anne's Church in Lviv.

In the mid-1960s, Konyk resided on Pekarska Street in Lviv, maintaining contact with members of the Ukrainian intelligentsia and former UHA veterans, including literary scholar Stepan Shchurat. The exact date of his death and place of burial remain unknown.

== Sources ==
- Boida, Andrii (2026). "Avstriiskyi period zhyttia Erasta Konyka (1886 – ?)". Naukovi horyzonty XXI stolittia: multydystsyplinarni doslidzhennia (in Ukrainian). Uzhhorod: Uzhhorod National University. pp. 259–263.
- Dumin, Osyp (1936). Istoriia Lehionu Ukrainskykh Sichovykh Striltsiv. 1914–1918 (in Ukrainian). Lviv: Chervona Kalyna.
- Halushchynskyi, Mykhailo (1934). "Z Ukrainskymy sichovymy striltsiamy". Dilo (in Ukrainian). No. 37. p. 4.
- Hancharyk, T. (1937). "Boi U.S.S. na Hori Kobyli 1914 r.". Litopys Chervonoi Kalyny (in Ukrainian) (10): 9–11.
- Khudash, Mykhailo (2009). "Iz moikh spohadiv pro doktora filolohichnykh nauk Stepana Vasylovycha Shchurata". Narodoznavchi zoshyty (in Ukrainian) (1–2): 260–280.
- Księga adresowa Małopolski: Lwów, Stanisławów, Tarnopol. Rocznik 1935/1936 (in Polish). Lwów. 1936. p. 192.
- Lazarovych, Mykola (2005). Lehion Ukrainskykh sichovykh striltsiv: formuvannia, ideia, borotba (in Ukrainian). Ternopil: Dzhura.
- Lytvyn, Mykola; Naumenko, Kim (1991). Istoriia halytskoho striletstva (in Ukrainian). Lviv: Kameniar.
