= Volodymyr Areshonkov =

Ukrainian politician

Volodymyr Yuriyovych Areshonkov
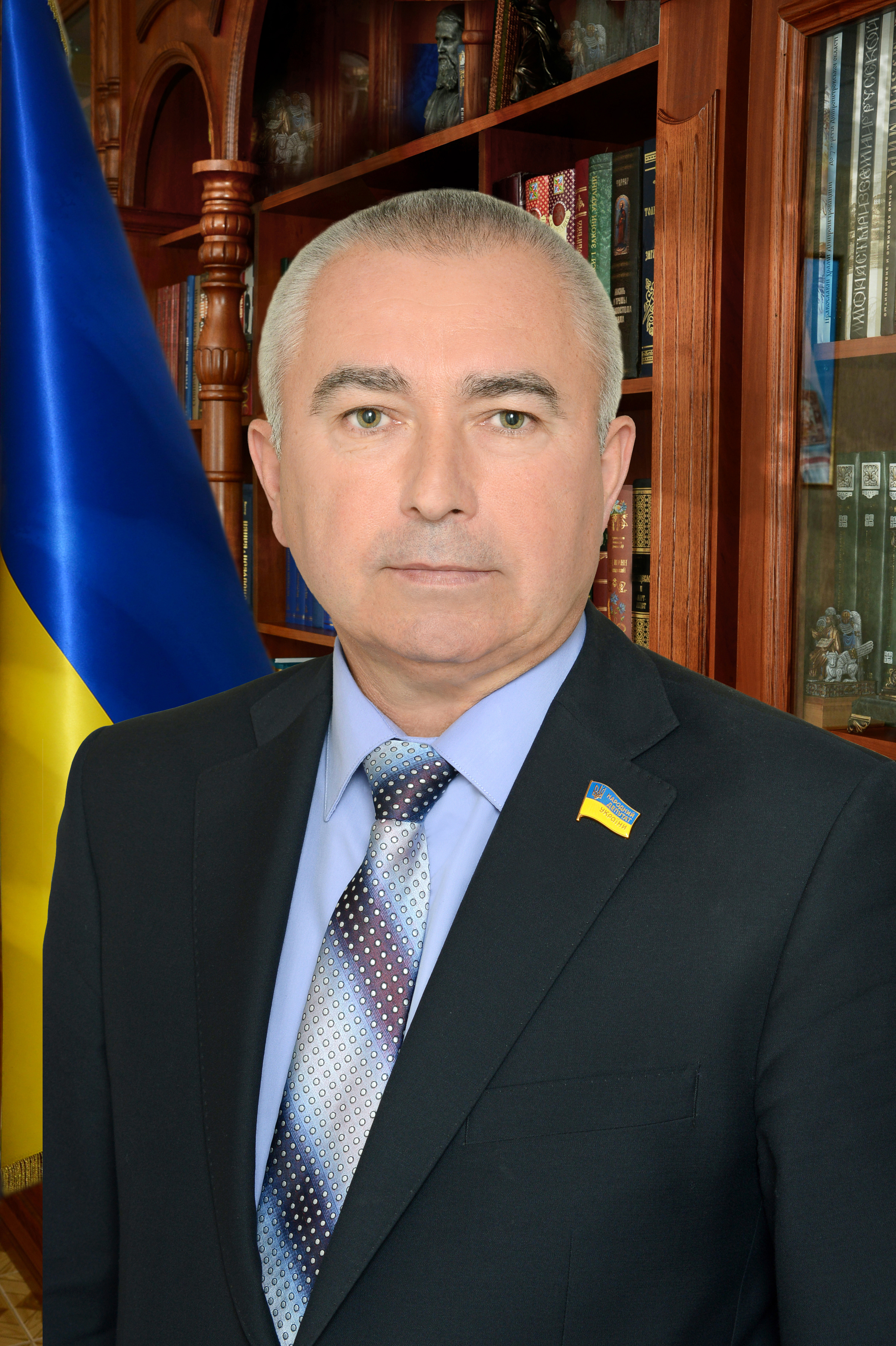
- Born: December 17, 1957 (age 67)
- Occupation: Ukrainian politician

Volodymyr Yuriyovych Areshonkov (Ukrainian: Володимир Арешонков; born December 17, 1957, in Korosten, Zhytomyr Oblast, Ukraine) is a People's Deputy of Ukraine and Honored Worker of Education of Ukraine (2017).

== Biography ==
- 1981 – Uzhhorod State University, Russian language and literature, philologist-teacher;
- 2003 – Ukrainian Academy of Public Administration under the President of Ukraine, Public Administration – Master of Public Administration;
- 2007 – Candidate of Pedagogical Sciences;
- 2008 – Associate Professor of Education Management and Innovative Educational Technologies.
- 2015 – Doctor of Pedagogical Sciences.
- 2016 – Professor of the Department of Special Historical Disciplines and Jurisprudence of Zhytomyr State University named after Ivan Franko.

== Labor and political activity ==
- April–November 2010 – Viktor Yanukovych is appointed head of the Korosten District State Administration.
- November 27, 2014 – elected People's Deputy of Ukraine in the 64th majority constituency with its center in Korosten from the Bloc of Petro Poroshenko party. Deputy Chairman of the Verkhovna Rada of Ukraine Committee on Rules of Procedure and Organization of Work of the Verkhovna Rada of Ukraine.

According to the media, he was engaged in bribing voters.
