= Opinion polling for the 2014 Ukrainian parliamentary election =

In the run up to the 2014 Ukrainian parliamentary election, various organisations carried out opinion polling to gauge voting intention in Ukraine. Results of such polls are displayed in this article.

The date range for these opinion polls are from the previous general election, held on 28 October 2012, to the day the next election was held, on 26 October 2014.

== Party vote ==
Poll results are listed in the table below in reverse chronological order, showing the most recent first. The percentages that overcome the 5% election threshold are displayed in bold, and the background shaded in the leading party's colour. In the instance that there is a tie, then no figure is bolded. The lead column on the right shows the percentage-point difference between the two parties with the highest figures. Poll results use the date the survey's fieldwork was done, as opposed to the date of publication. However, if such date is unknown, the date of publication will be given instead.

Date	Polling firm	PoR	Fatherland	UDAR	Svoboda	CPU	Poroshenko Bloc	Radical	CP	SU	SR	PF (Note: A new party led by Arseniy Yatsenyuk and Oleksandr Turchynov that was formed after several people left Fatherland on 21 August 2014 (see People's Front).)	Others	Lead
12–21 Oct	Gorshenin Institute	(Note: In this poll this party was either not polled as an independent party, or its results were categorised in its "Others"-section.)	**10.4**	(Note: In this poll UDAR and Yuri Lutsenko were polled along with the Bloc of Petro Poroshenko.)	3	2.8	**24.2**	**7.4**	**5.4**	4	**5.3**	**7.9**	7.1 (Note: In this poll 19% of respondents who intend to vote had not decided whom to vote for and 3.5% were unable to answer the question.)	13.8
9–18 Oct	KIIS, Ilko Kucheriv Democratic Initiatives Foundation		4.7		2	2.8	**20.5**	**8.6**	3.3	3.75	**5.8**	**6.8**	9.75 (Note: In this poll 32% of respondents who intend to vote had not decided whom to vote for.)	11.9
1–8 Oct	Rating		**6.9**		~4	4.5	**33.5**	**12.8**	4.6	**7.8**	**5.4**	**8.9**	~11.6 (Note: In this poll, Opposition Bloc received 5.1%, thus overcoming the threshold required to enter the Rada.)	20.7
24 Sep – 5 Oct	GfK Ukraine		**8.7**				**29.9**	**7.6**	**7.3**			**7.0**		21.2
19–22 Sep	Active Group		**6.3**		4	2.9	**40.8**	**11.7**	**8.2**	4.7	2.0	**6.6**	12.8	29.1
15–21 Sep	All-Ukrainian Sociological Service (Note: This survey shows its poll results without disregarding those who are undecided or said they will abstain from voting (either physically or by voting blank). To obtain results comparable to other surveys and the official election results, the result shown in this table will be that obtained, with a simple rule of three, from disregarding undecided and/or abstaining voters from the totals offered in the survey.)		**11.7**		**9.4**	2.4	**40.5**	**12.5**	**6.6**	4.7	3.2	**6.6**	2.4	28
12–21 Sep	KIIS, Ilko Kucheriv Democratic Initiatives Foundation		**7.8**	4.3	4.7	4.5	**39.5**	**10.4**	**6.9**	**5.2**	2.6	**5.8**	8.2	29.1
5–12 Sep	UISPP (NAPS)	2.0	**7.9**	4.6	4.6	4.2	**31.5**	**12.7**	**6.6**	**6.3**	3.0	**8.1**	8.7	18.8
5–10 Sep	SOCIS	1.9	**8.1**		4.5	2.9	**45.7**	**13.7**	**8.1**	4.4	2.0	**5.6**	3.1	32.0
23 Aug – 2 Sep	KIIS	3.8	**6.1**		4.4	4.6	**37.1**	**13.1**	**9.7**	**7.8**	2.9	**6.4**	2.3	24.0
**2014 parliamentary election campaign**
14–25 Aug	GfK Ukraine	2	**13** (Note: The party would gain this result if Arseniy Yatsenyuk would be on its party list)	**6**	4	3	**16**	**14**	**7**	**6**	1	(Note: The possible results for a possible (new) party of Arseniy Yatsenyuk and Oleksandr Turchynov were not polled)	2	2
16–23 Jul	KIIS	2.7	**17.4**	**11.5**	**6.9**	3.9	**11.1**	**22.2**	**11.5**	**5.3**	3.3	-	4.2	4.8
28 Jun – 10 Jul	Rating	3.8	**16.6** (Note: In this poll Front for Change, which is part of the Fatherland coalition, was polled independently and received 3.4% of decided votes.)	**8.7**	4.8	4.4	**27.8**	**11.5**	**5.3**	4.0	1.0	-	7.6	11.2
**2014 presidential election**
8–18 May	Democratic Initiative Foundation	3 (Note: For the results of Strong Ukraine see SU section in this table.)	**10.4**	**6.8**	3.1	**5.2**	**22.4**	4.5	NP	4.2	1.2	-	4.3 (Note: In this poll 23.1% of respondents had not decided whom to vote for and 11.8% had stated that they would not take part in the election.)	12
8–13 May	Rating	**9** (Note: Including Strong Ukraine.)	**17.4**	**13.1**	**6.6**	**6.3**	**26.6**	**7.2**	**6.8**	–	0.8	-	6.2	9.2
25–29 Apr	Razumkov Centre	**11.6**	**20.3**	**12.2**	**5.2**	**6.5**	**31.1**	**5.7**	–	–	-	-	7.4	10.8
14–26 Mar	International Republican Institute (Note: Some opinion polls round their data so that in the end up showing a .0 or a .5 value. This practise is maintained for these polls when disregarding undecided and/or abstaining voters from the totals so as to avoid different interpretations of the same value.)	**9.5**	**25.5**	**19**	**8**	**6.5**	**17.5**	–	–	–	-	-	16	6.5
14–19 Mar	SOCIS, KIIS, Rating, Razumkov Centre	**13.6**	**22.2**	**16.4**	**5.2**	**6.9**	**21.6**	**5.7**	–	–	-	-	8.5	0.6
1–6 Mar	Social Monitoring Centre	**16.6**	**21.7**	**19.8**	**6.5**	**7.9**	**13.7**	4.4	–	–	-	-	9.5	0.9
24 Feb – 4 Mar	SOCIS	**12.9**	**22.7**	**22.3**	**6.5**	**7.1**	**18.9**	3.7	–	–	-	-	5.9	0.4
28 Feb – 3 Mar	KIIS	**16.2**	**24**	**25.4**	**7.1**	**10.8**	4.6	**5.4**	–	–	-	-	6.7	1.4
**2014 Ukrainian revolution**
24 Jan – 1 Feb	SOCIS	**29.2**	**21.4**	**23.4**	**5.6**	**5.8**	**9.8**	1.1	–	–	-	-	3.5	5.8
17–26 Jan	SOCIS	**29.2**	**20.2**	**23.8**	**6.7**	**7.6**	**9.4**	0.7	–	–	-	-	2.3	5.4
**2014 calendar year**
23–27 Dec	R&B Group	**36.6**	**22.1**	**21.8**	**9.4**	**7.1**	–	–	–	–	-	-	3.1	14.5
7–17 Dec	Rating	**28.1**	**23.6**	**22.1**	**7.8**	**7.6**	4.9	1.0	–	–	-	-	4.7	4.5
30 Sep – 8 Oct	Razumkov Centre	**27.7**	**27.9**	**21**	**7**	**9.3**	–	0.8	–	–	-	-	6.2	0.2
26 Sep – 6 Oct	Rating	**27.0**	**26**	**21**	**9**	**10**	–	–	–	–	-	-	7.0	1.0
15–25 Sep	R&B Group	**32.9**	**27.9**	**19.9**	**7.9**	**9.1**	–	–	–	–	-	-	2.5	5.0
**2013 calendar year**
**28 October 2012**	**2012 election results**	**30**	**25.6**	**14**	**10.5**	**13.2**	–	**1.08**	–	–	-	-	**6.9**	**4.4**
