= Dmitri Golubov (politician) =

Ukrainian politician (born 1983)

- Дмитро Голубов
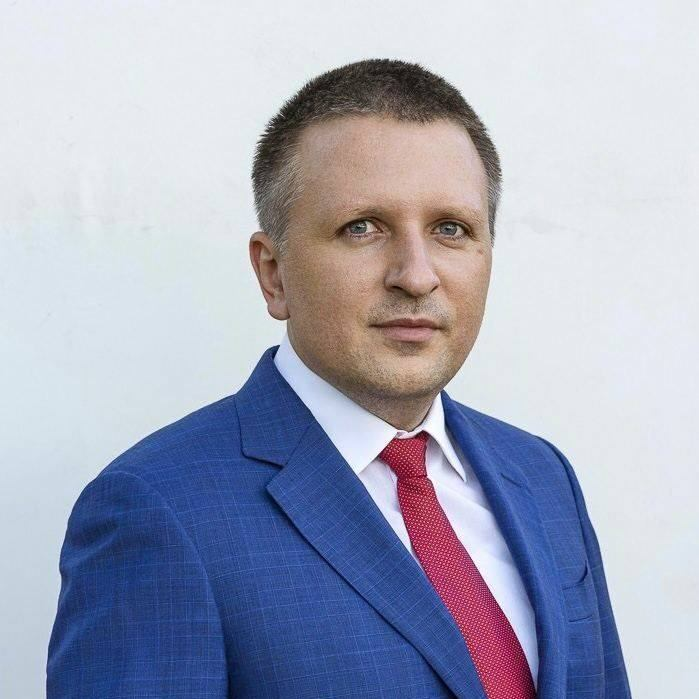

People's Deputy of Ukraine
- In office 27 November 2014 – 29 August 2019

Personal details
- Born: October 16, 1983 (age 42) Odesa, Ukraine

Dmitri Ivanovich Golubov (Note: as it is commonly transliterated from the Russian: Дмитрий Иванович Голубов. Transliterated as Dmytro Ivanovych Holubov from Ukrainian) (Ukrainian: Дмитро Іванович Голубов, born October 16, 1983) is a Ukrainian politician and former People's Deputy of Ukraine, cybercriminal, former carder. He is also the leader of the Internet Party of Ukraine, although he has never taken part in any election as a candidate of this party.

== Political career ==
In the 2014 Ukrainian parliamentary election Golubov won a parliamentary seat as a candidate for Petro Poroshenko Bloc constituency 136 located in Odesa with 30.31% of the votes.

In the 2019 Ukrainian parliamentary election Golubov was not reelected in constituency 136, this time as an independent candidate, with 40.92% of the votes (winner Oleksandr Horeniuk of Servant of the People gained 47.08%).

In 2012 Golubov bought 4376 bitcoins and declared it in 2017.

In the 2020 Odesa local election Golubov was a candidate for mayor of Odesa (nominated by Dmitry Golubov Bloc). After his below 1% score Golubov and his Dmitry Golubov Bloc supported Opposition Platform — For Life candidate Mykola Skoryk in the second round of the election. Incumbent mayor Gennadiy Trukhanov defeated Skoryk in the second round of the mayoral election on 15 November 2020 with 54.28% of the votes.

== Carderplanet case ==
In the mid-2000s, Golubov was involved in a hacking case with international payment bank cards under the nickname of Script.

In 2001 or 2003, Carderplanet.com was launched and registered in Madagascar, where a group of about 7,000 card-criminals were engaged in bank card fraud. The participants registered on the site were mainly representatives of Eastern European countries.

The leaders of the criminal group were tracked down after the FBI, US Secret Service and the United States Postal Inspection Service were engaged in the investigation of frauds using information from the Carderplanet.com website. On July 7, 2005, Golubov was detained at his home in Odesa.

Golubov spent six months in the Lukyanivska Prison in Kyiv. He was threatened with imprisonment for up to 12 years. On December 22, 2005, at a preliminary hearing in the Solomensky District Court of Kyiv, Judge Volodymyr Skoryk decided to release Golubov from custody and transfer him to bail MPs Volodymyr Makeyenko and Volodymyr Demyokhin. They made a deposit of ₴50,000 each. The judge denied MasterCard and Visa representatives to appear in court as civil plaintiffs.

After four years of court proceedings, Golubov was fully acquitted by the Solomensky District Court of Kyiv under Articles 200 part 2, 255 part 1, 190 part 4 because of "lack of corpus delicti."
