= Oleh Meidych =

Ukrainian businessman and politician

- Олег Мейдич
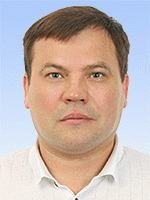
- Official portrait, 2019

People's Deputy of Ukraine
- Incumbent
- Assumed office 29 August 2019
- Preceded by: Ruslan Demchak
- Constituency: Vinnytsia Oblast, No. 18

Personal details
- Born: 24 November 1970 (age 55) Kalynivka, Ukrainian SSR, Soviet Union (now Ukraine)
- Party: Batkivshchyna

Oleh Leonidovych Meidych (Ukrainian: Олег Леонідович Мейдич; born 24 November 1970) is a Ukrainian businessman and politician currently serving as a People's Deputy of Ukraine from Ukraine's 18th electoral district, representing north-eastern Vinnytsia Oblast.

== Early life ==
Meidych was born on 24 November 1970 in Kalynivka, which was then part of the Ukrainian SSR in the Soviet Union. He later received a higher education.

Meidych is director of Kalinov Dairy Plant Ltd. He has also founded the private enterprise "Prodholod", the agricultural company "Ivan Sirko Regiment", and the nonprofit "Wrestling Association of the Vinnytsia Oblast".

== Political career ==
In 2002 and 2010, he ran for the Vinnytsia Oblast Council, both times unsuccessfully as an independent candidate and later a candidate of the Socialist Party of Ukraine. Meidich worked as an assistant to People's Deputy Petro Gasyuk from 2007 to 2012.

From 2015, Meidych was a member of the Vinnytsia Oblast Council, serving as head of the Batkivshchyna party in the council, as well as a member of the Standing Committee on Regulation of Communal Property and Privatization.

He was a proxy candidate of Yulia Tymoshenko in the 2019 Ukrainian presidential election.

In the 2019 Ukrainian parliamentary election, Meidych was a successful candidate for People's Deputy of Ukraine, running in Ukraine's 18th electoral district as a member of Batkivshchyna. He currently serves as First Deputy Chairman of the Committee on Agrarian Policy and Land Relations in the Verkhovna Rada.
