= Piano voting =

Lawmakers voting on others' behalf

Piano voting, also known as ghost voting, is the practice of a legislator voting for an absent one, either with or without their consent. Piano voting is illegal in many countries. The term is a metaphor: voters are pushing multiple keys, as if playing piano.

== By country ==
=== Ukraine ===
Piano voting is a common occurrence in Ukraine, even at the parliamentary level in the Verkhovna Rada (the Ukrainian national parliament). The Ukrainian government has attempted to curtail the practice, through disincentives like fines and the installation of sensor technology that makes it more difficult to vote for multiple people. Nonetheless, piano voting remains a serious issue at both the national level and the local level.

=== Other ===
There have been several votes in which members of the Parliament of Armenia, mainly of the Republican Party of Armenia (RPA), voted instead of other MPs.

Piano voting has been reported in Russia.
