= Konstantin Usov =

Ukrainian politician

- Константин Усов
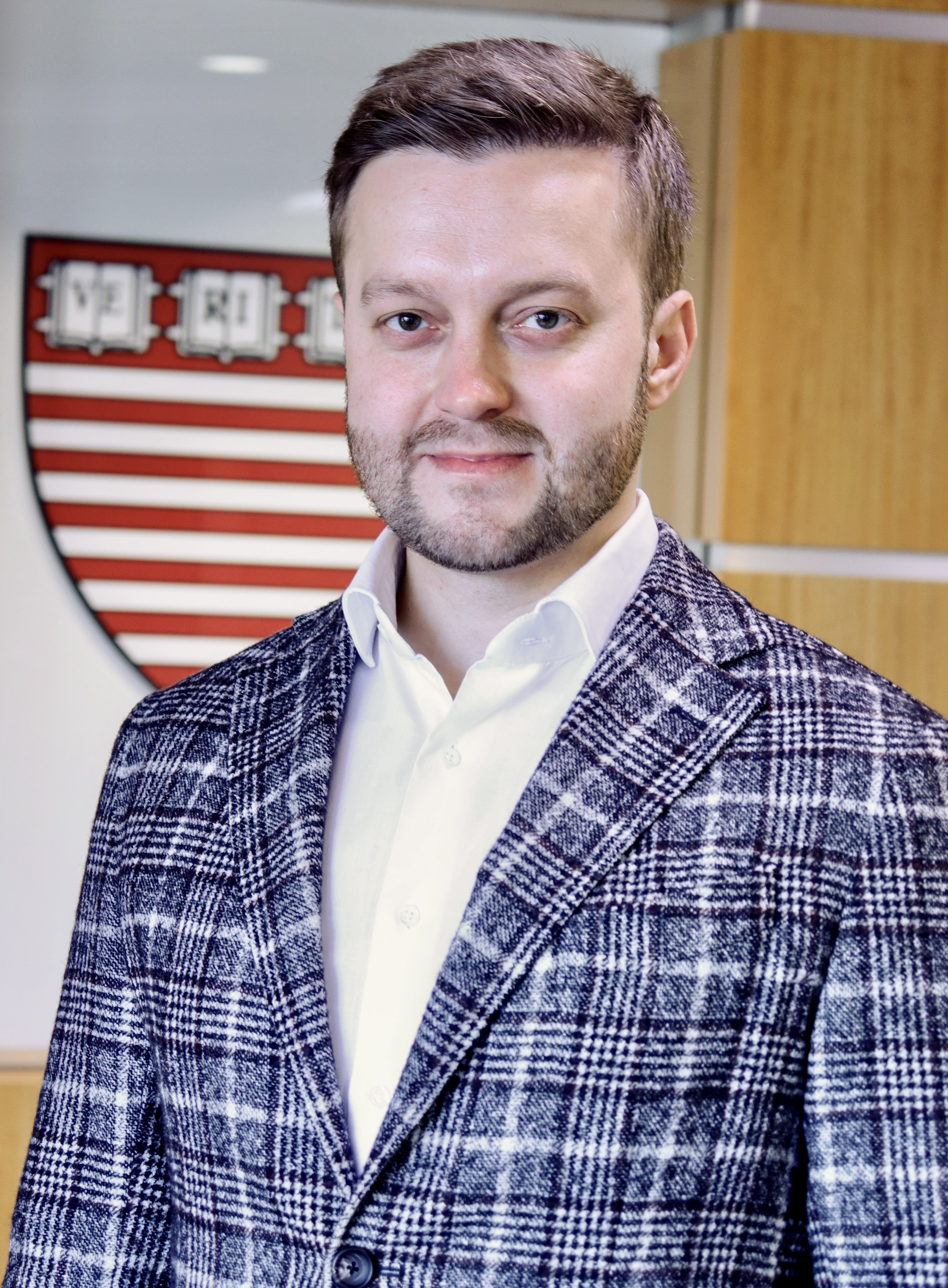

Deputy Mayor of Kyiv
- Incumbent
- Assumed office 11 February 2021

People's Deputy of Ukraine
- In office 31 October 2014 – 29 August 2019

Personal details
- Born: 9 July 1988 (age 38) Kryvyi Rih, Dnipropetrovsk Oblast, Ukrainian SSR, Soviet Union
- Party: European Solidarity
- Education: Taras Shevchenko National University of Kyiv; Harvard University
- Occupation: Politician

Konstantin Glebovich Usov (Russian: Константин Глебович Усов, Konstyantyn Hlibovych Usov from Ukrainian: Костянтин Глібович Усов; born 9 July 1988) is a Ukrainian politician, People's Deputy of the 8th Ukrainian Verkhovna Rada, and member of the Kyiv City Council. Since 11 February 2021, Usov has been serving as the Deputy Head of the Kyiv City State Administration for self-governing. Until the beginning of the Russian invasion of Ukraine, he coordinated the activities of the Centers for Administrative Services (CAS), the Department of Registration of the Kyiv City State Administration, and the Department of Transport of the Kyiv City State Administration.

== Biography ==
Konstantin Usov was born on 9 July 1988 in Kryvyi Rih into a family of engineers. At the age of thirteen he won a black belt in karate. In 2007, he started working as a correspondent for the newspaper Kommersant Ukraine. In 2013 he became the chairman of the supervisory board of the "First City TV Channel. Odesa." In April 2014, he was appointed an adviser to the head of the Odesa Regional State Administration.

Between November 2014 and August 2019, Usov served as a member of the Parliament of the VIII convocation and the Deputy Chairman of the Verkhovna Rada Committee on Informatization and Communications. Since 2015, he has served as the Secretary of the Special Control Commission of the Verkhovna Rada of Ukraine on Privatization. From 2016, he was the Deputy Member of the Permanent Delegation of the Parliamentary Assembly of the Council of Europe and the member of the PACE's Committee on Equality and Non-Discrimination. From 2018, Usov was the member of the PACE's Committee on the Election of Judges to the European Court of Human Rights. Between September 2019 and February 2021, he worked as Director of Business Development and Legal Affairs at EVERLEGAL Law Firm. Since February 2021, he has been serving as the Deputy Head of the Kyiv City State Administration for self-governing.

Usov speaks Ukrainian, Russian, English and Spanish. He is married, with two sons.

== Education ==
- 2005 — Central City Gymnasium (Kryvyi Rih).
- 2009 — Taras Shevchenko National University of Kyiv, Journalism School
- 2012 — the United States Department of State’s IVLP program, "Fight Against Corruption"
- 2013 — Taras Shevchenko National University of Kyiv, Law School.
- 2023 — Harvard University, Master in Public Administration.

== Journalism career ==
In 2006, Usov did an internship at the BBC News Ukrainian Service in London. He worked for "Telekrytyka," Novyi Kanal, STB, Focusmagazine, and Dzerkalo Tyzhnia weekly newspaper. From 2007, he worked for Kommersant Ukraine newspaper. From 2009, he worked as an investigative journalist for TVi. Usov's investigative reports include "Lukianivka. Prison #1," "Special investigation. Political Repression," "Rent the Crowd," "Friends of the President," "Dikaiev’s Gang." For some of these investigations, Usov was threatened with criminal cases.

== Political career ==
In 2014, Usov was elected the member of the Verkhovna Rada from Kryvyi Rih's single district #33, being the youngest majority-elected member of the parliament of the VIII convocation. In the Verkhovna Rada, he worked as Deputy Chairman of the Verkhovna Rada Committee on Informatization and Communications and Secretary of the Special Control Commission of the Verkhovna Rada of Ukraine on Privatization.

Usov as a Deputy Member of the Permanent Delegation to the Parliamentary Assembly of the Council of Europe. In January 2018, Konstantin Usov joined the PACE Committee on Legal Affairs and Human Rights responsible for forming the composition of the European Court. A total of 40 legal professionals are elected to the committee from among nearly a thousand PACE delegates. On 25 December 2018, Russia imposed sanctions on Usov. In the local elections of 2020 he was elected a member of the Kyiv City Council of the 9th convocation. On 9 February 2021, Vitali Klitschko, the mayor of Kyiv, appointed Usov deputy head of the Kyiv City State Administration.

=== Legislative activities ===
In February 2016, the Verkhovna Rada introduced the draft law on Amendments to Certain Legislative Acts of Ukraine on Fighting Bribery. Under this regulation, law enforcement officials, their deputies, and other high-ranking law enforcement officials and judges who receive particularly large amounts of illegal benefits will be sentenced to life imprisonment with confiscation of property. Moreover, those sentenced to life imprisonment are not subject to amnesty under this law.

On 1 April 2016, Usov registered a draft law amending the Code of Ukraine on Administrative Offenses to strengthen liability for violations of environmental legislation, according to which the fines for unauthorized emissions from industrial enterprises will increase up to 400 times.

On 1 August 2017, the law on reducing the rates of excise duty on cars from Europe came into force. The largest reduction in excise duty will affect cars with engine capacity of 1-1.5 liters: by almost 22 times —down to €0.063 per 1 cm3 of engine capacity.

Konstantin Usov was directly involved in drafting of the Law "On Education" including the wording of Article 7 which stipulates for primary, secondary, and higher education in Ukraine in the state language.

=== Activities in Kryvyi Rih ===
During the Usov's tenure as MP, more than 40 city schools and kindergartens were restored, modernized, and reconstructed. In 2015–2016, Konstantin Usov together with volunteers equipped all combat vehicles of the 17th Tank Brigade from Kryvyi Rih with slat armor screens. They protect tank crewmen and the vehicles from High-explosive anti-tank shells, which penetrate the tank armor and burn everything inside. At Usov's initiative, the "Karachuny" Culture Palace in the Central City District, Kryvyi Rih was reconstructed and a square created around it. In 2018–2019, the parliamentarian installed 20 free and accessible round-the-clock fitness stations in three central districts of Kryvyi Rih, which are part of the 33rd constituency (represented by Konstantin Usov in the Verkhovna Rada).

In June 2019, Konstantin Usov said he would not run for the Verkhovna Rada of the next convocation because he did not want to be an "eternal MP." The politician resigned as an MP and continued to work on infrastructure projects which he undertook during his time in the parliament. Upon the initiative of Usov, Hdantsivskyi Park was revived and the reconstruction of the Spartak Stadium in Kryvyi Rih is continuing.

The political website Slovo I Dilo recognized Konstantin Usov as the most responsible parliamentarian of the Dnipropetrovsk region. According to analysts, Usov has fulfilled 75 percent of his promises, one of which is currently being implemented.

=== Activities as Deputy Head of the Kyiv City State Administration ===
Kostiantyn Usov successfully introduced significant changes into passenger transportation standards for general city routes. This caused a number of protests against him by some dissatisfied public transport operators.

Upon his initiative, Kyiv has regulated operations of rented electric scooters. Without waiting for relevant legislation to be adopted by the Verkhovna Rada, Kyiv city authorities signed a Memorandum with all operators of rented electric scooters, outlining basic rules of their operations.

== Awards ==
- In 2012 Usov was awarded a special prize in the professional competition "Honor of the Profession."
- In 2012, he received the Oleksandr Kryvenko Prize "For progress in journalism."

== See also ==
- List of members of the parliament of Ukraine, 2014–2019
