= Oleh Kryshyn =

Ukrainian entrepreneur and politician

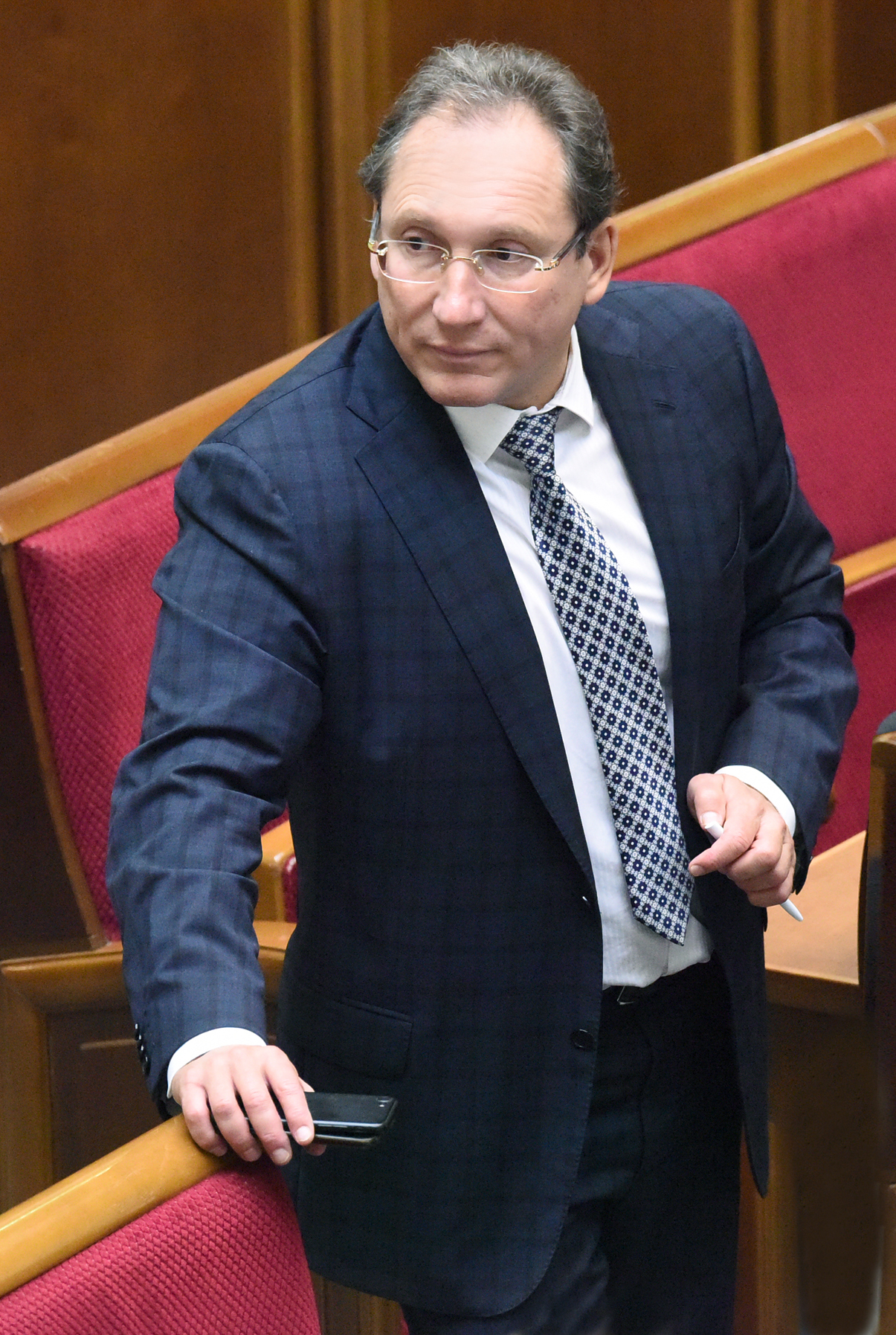

People's Deputy of Ukraine

8th convocation
- Incumbent
- Assumed office November 27, 2014

Personal details
- Born: November 27, 1967 (age 58) Dnipropetrovsk, Ukraine
- Education: National Metallurgical Academy of Ukraine

Oleh Yuriiovych Kryshyn (Ukrainian: Олег Юрійович Кришин; born 27 November 1967, Dnipropetrovsk) is a Ukrainian entrepreneur, political leader and statesman. People's Deputy of Ukraine of the 8th convocation.

== Education ==
In 1992 he graduated from the National Metallurgical Academy of Ukraine, qualification — metallurgic engineer. In 2004 he graduated from the same academy with an engineer-economist qualification.

== Working Activity ==
The Head of the Overlook Council Limited Liability Company «Vilnohirsk Sklo».

== Elections, Party Activity ==
2010–2014 – a deputy of Dnipropetrovsk Oblast Council.

In October 26, 2014 Kryshyn was elected a people’s deputy of the 8th convocation according to the single-seat majority constituency № 34, Dnipropetrovsk Oblast, as a self-nominated candidate. He got 24.29% votes.

In the Verkhovna Rada of the 8th convocation he was a member of deputy’s faction of the political party «People's Front (Ukraine)».

Post: the secretary of the Verkhovna Rada Committee on the Taxes and Customs House Issues.
