= Oleksandr Horeniuk =

Ukrainian politician

- Олександр Горенюк
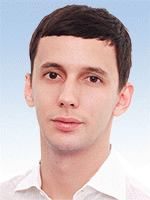
- Official portrait, 2019

People's Deputy of Ukraine
- Incumbent
- Assumed office 29 August 2019
- Preceded by: Dmitri Golubov
- Constituency: Odesa Oblast, No. 136

Personal details
- Born: 8 August 1991 (age 35) Odesa, Ukrainian SSR, Soviet Union (now Ukraine)
- Party: Servant of the People
- Other political affiliations: Independent
- Education: Taras Shevchenko National University of Kyiv; CANactions School for Urban Studies

Oleksandr Oleksandrovych Horeniuk (Ukrainian: Олександр Олександрович Горенюк; born 8 August 1991) is a Ukrainian politician currently serving as a People's Deputy of Ukraine representing Ukraine's 136th electoral district from Servant of the People since 29 August 2019.

== Early life and career ==
Oleksandr Oleksandrovych Horeniuk was born on 8 August 1991 in the city of Odesa, on Ukraine's Black Sea coast. He is a graduate of the Taras Shevchenko National University of Kyiv's international law faculty, as well as the CANactions School for Urban studies, specialising in strategic tools for modern urban development.

Prior to his election, Horeniuk variously worked in international law, urban planning, design, and translation. He was head of the Bureau of Anti-Corruption Investigations, a non-governmental organisation, as well as chairman of the "Children of the Future" charitable organisation. He is the author or co-author of multiple urban renewal projects in Odesa, as well as founder of the 4City restaurant.

== Political career ==
In the 2019 Ukrainian parliamentary election, Horeniuk ran for the office of People's Deputy of Ukraine from Ukraine's 163rd electoral district as the candidate of Servant of the People. At the time of the election, he was an independent. He was successfully elected with 47.07% of the vote, defeating independent incumbent Dmitri Golubov, who garnered 40.91% of the vote.

In the Verkhovna Rada (Ukraine's parliament), Horeniuk joined the Servant of the People faction, as well as the Verkhovna Rada Transport and Infrastructure Committee. He is also a member of the inter-factional associations Blockchain4Ukraine and For Odeshchyna. In his capacity as a People's Deputy, Horeniuk has worked to reform public transportation in an effort to bring it up to the standards and regulations of the European Union, lowering prices and improving the quality of service.

In October 2021, during his visit to Odesa and participation in the Congress of Local and Regional Authorities, Volodymyr Zelenskyy supported the project to finance the reconstruction of Jeanne Labourb Park in Odesa, authored by Oleksandr Horeniuk.
