= Ruslan Demchak =

Ukrainian businessman, politician, and diplomat

- Руслан Демчак
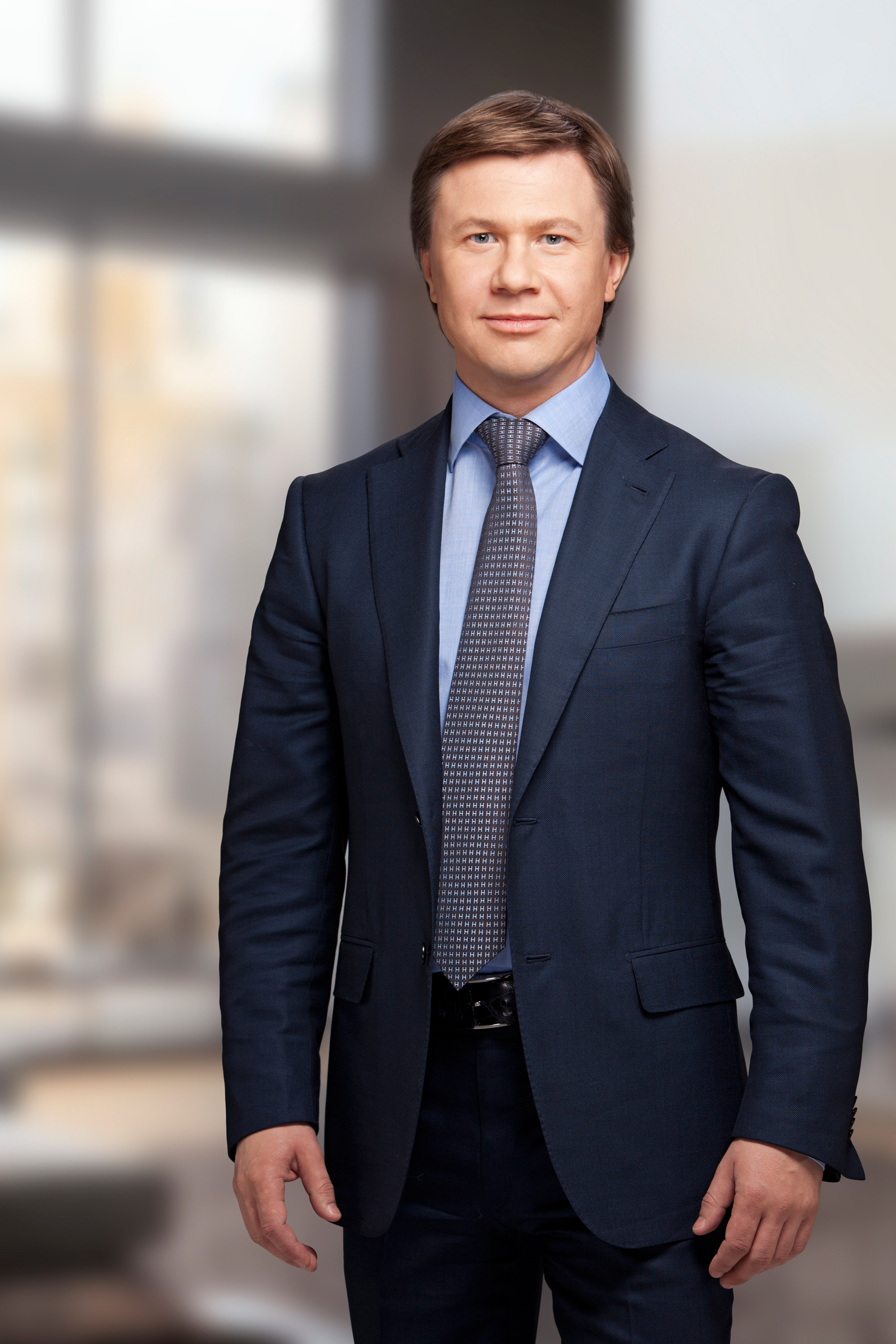
- Demchak in 2014

People's Deputy of Ukraine
- In office 27 November 2014 – 29 August 2019
- Preceded by: Hryhory Kaletnik
- Succeeded by: Oleh Meidych
- Constituency: Vinnytsia Oblast, No. 18

Personal details
- Born: 5 July 1974 (age 52) Lypovets, Ukrainian SSR, Soviet Union (now Ukraine)
- Party: European Solidarity (2014–present)
- Spouse: Lee Bokyoung
- Education: National Transport University
- Website: demchak-ruslan.com.ua

Ruslan Yevheniiovych Demchak (Ukrainian: Руслан Євгенійович Демчак; born 5 July 1974) is a Ukrainian businessman, politician and diplomat. He previously served as a People's Deputy of Ukraine from 27 November 2014 to 29 August 2019, representing Ukraine's 18th electoral district. Demchak is a member of European Solidarity.

== Biography ==
After graduating from school in 1991, Ruslan Demchak entered the Ukrainian Transport University, where he studied Mechanical Engineering until 1996. In 1997 Demchak started his studies of Accounting and Audit at the Interdisciplinary Institute of Management. In 2001 he was awarded an Economist diploma.

From 2001 to 2005, Demchak studied at the National Academy of Public Administration, where he completed his master's thesis "State regulation of the stock market of Ukraine" at the department of economic theory and economic history and was awarded a Doctor of Philosophy in Public policy & Administration (PhD).

In October 2009, Ruslan Demchak started his PhD at the National Institute for Strategic Studies. His thesis subject was "Fiscal decentralisation as a factor of economic security of the state."

In December 2010, Demchak became a Chairman of the Federation of Employers of Kyiv (FEK).

In the 2012 Ukrainian parliamentary election Demchak unsuccessfully tried to win a seat in the Verkhovna Rada (the national parliament of Ukraine) as an independent candidate.

In the November 2014 Ukrainian parliamentary election, Ruslan Demchak was elected as a People's Deputy of Ukraine as a candidate for Petro Poroshenko Bloc in Ukraine's 18th electoral district.

Demchak failed to be reelected in the 2019 Ukrainian parliamentary election in the 18th electoral district, this time as a candidate of European Solidarity.

In 2021 Demchak became the Counsellor for economic issues of the Embassy of Ukraine in the Republic of Korea.

In August 2023 Demchak was informed he was charged in a criminal case "for assistance in manipulating the stock exchange and legalizing property obtained through crime." According to the Security Service of Ukraine Demchak had left Ukraine in April 2023.

In 2025 the High Anti-Corruption Court of Ukraine sentenced Demchak to 3 years in prison for having unjustified received compensation for renting a room at Kyiv Hotel near the Verkhovna Rada building in Kyiv. He was released from serving his sentence with a probationary period of 1 year after he agreed to reimburse the rent and make a charitable donation of 2 million hryvnias.

On 1 January 2026 Demchak was detained in Germany in connection with the August 2023 criminal case.

== Activities ==
Ruslan Demchak started his business in the stock market in 1997. Ruslan Demchak founded Corporation «Ukrainian Business Group» (multinational holding company). In 2011 he transferred the control of the UBG Corporation to the managers of the organisation in order to participate in public activities.

The UBG Corporation has considerable experience in managing businesses in various industries including finance, manufacturing, medical services, agriculture, media and information technology sectors. The most successful project is "Dobrobut" Medical Network, the largest network of private clinics in Ukraine to the day.

In 2011 Ruslan Demchak established a representative office of UBG Corporation in London, Ukrainian Business Centre in London (UBCL).

Ruslan Demchak is also actively engaged in other public activities. In 2010 he became chairman of the Federation of Employers (FEK) of Kyiv. The FEK consists of 22 local and industry organisations of employers that bring together over 3,000 legal entities and public organisations, which employ more than 150,000 people in Kyiv.

The Deputy Chairman of the Financial Policy and Banking Committee of Parliament of Ukraine and an author of a number of laws of Ukraine in the financial and other areas.

== Academic Activity ==
In 2005, Ruslan Demchak defended his dissertation for the degree of Candidate of Sciences in Public Administration on the topic “State Regulation of Stock Market Development in Ukraine.” The research was conducted at the National Academy for Public Administration under the President of Ukraine. The dissertation examined issues of state regulation of the stock market, interaction among its participants, as well as mechanisms of state regulation and self-regulation.

In 2009, Demchak was admitted to the doctoral programme at the National Institute for Strategic Studies. His dissertation research focused on budget decentralization as a factor in ensuring the economic security of the state.

Demchak’s academic publications address issues of state regulation of the financial and stock markets, budget decentralization, public finance, and economic security.

In particular, in 2009 he published the paper “Formation of the Stock Market in Ukraine amid the Globalization of Financial Processes,” while in 2015 he published the articles “Conceptual Foundations of Budget Decentralization in the Context of Strengthening Economic Security” and “Foreign Experience in the Decentralization of Public Administration.”

== Work at the Embassy of Ukraine in the Republic of Korea ==
In 2021, Demchak began working at the Ministry of Foreign Affairs of Ukraine as an Economic Affairs Counsellor at the Embassy of Ukraine in the Republic of Korea. According to declaration data, he held this position until July 2025.

During his tenure in Korea, Demchak participated in events focused on trade and economic cooperation, investment, and business development. In 2021, he spoke at the Industrial Parks Forum held as part of the “Ukrainian Industrial Days,” presenting South Korean practices for promoting investment and developing industrial parks. He also participated in the opening of Trade Week 2021 in Seoul and attended the international food industry exhibition COEX Food Week Korea 2021, in which the Ukrainian company Gartner Ukraine participated.

As part of his work with the Ukrainian community in South Korea, Demchak participated in meetings with representatives of the Orthodox community in Seoul. During one of the meetings, the possibility of establishing a Sunday school for Ukrainian children at the church was discussed.
