= Iryna Konstankevych =

Ukrainian politician (born 1965)

- Ірина Констанкевич
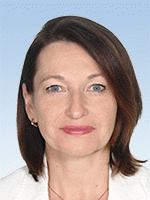
- Official portrait, 2019

People's Deputy of Ukraine
- Incumbent
- Assumed office 6 June 2016
- Preceded by: Ihor Yermeyev
- Constituency: Volyn Oblast, No. 23

Personal details
- Born: 23 June 1965 (age 60) Lviv, Ukrainian SSR, Soviet Union (now Ukraine)
- Party: For the Future
- Other political affiliations: Independent; UKROP (2016–2019)

Iryna Myroslavivna Konstankevych (Ukrainian: Ірина Мирославівна Констанкевич; born 23 June 1965) is a Ukrainian politician currently serving as a People's Deputy of Ukraine representing Ukraine's 23rd electoral district since 2016, first as a member of UKROP and currently as a member of For the Future.

== Biography ==
She was born on 23 June 1965 in the city of Lviv. She has lived in Lutsk since 1968. She studied at secondary school No. 2 in Lutsk from 1972 to 1982. From 1982 to 1987 she studied at the Taras Shevchenko National University of Kyiv at the Faculty of Philology.

1988-1991 postgraduate studies at the Institute of Literature. Taras Shevchenko National Academy of Sciences of Ukraine. In 1998 she defended her dissertation on the special council of the Institute of Literature. Taras Shevchenko National Academy of Sciences of Ukraine and received the degree of Candidate of Philological Sciences.

2013-2015 doctoral studies. In 2015 she defended her dissertation at the Institute of Literature. Taras Shevchenko National Academy of Sciences of Ukraine and received the degree of Doctor of Philology.

== Professional activity ==
From 1991 to 2016, she was a lecturer at the Department of Ukrainian Literature (assistant, senior lecturer, associate professor, professor) of Lesya Ukrainka Volyn National University. Courses: History of Ukrainian literature (20s of the 20th century), Ukrainian literature in the world context, Modern Ukrainian literature

2006-2013 — vice-rector for educational work at Lesya Ukrainka Volyn National University.

2002-2015 — Head of the Department of Ukrainian Literature at Lesya Ukrainka Volyn National University.

2015 — defended her thesis at the Special Council of the Institute of Literature named after T. G. Shevchenko of the National Academy of Sciences of Ukraine and obtained the scientific degree of doctor of philological sciences.

2013-2015 — doctoral studies in the specialty "Ukrainian literature".

2002 — awarded the academic title of associate professor.

1998 — she defended her candidate's thesis at the special council of the Taras Shevchenko Institute of Literature of the National Academy of Sciences of Ukraine and obtained the scientific degree of candidate of philological sciences.

== Social activities ==
From 2006 to 2013 — Head of the Charitable Foundation "Educational Foundation of Lesya Ukrainka".

From December 2013 to the present, she is a member of the board of the Only Together Ihor Palytsia Foundation.

Member of the coordinating council for art education and science of the National Academy of Arts of Ukraine.

== Political activity ==
2019 — elected to the Verkhovna Rada of the IX convocation as a self-nominated candidate from the 23rd district (Volyn region), gaining 48.94% of the vote. Member of the deputy group "For the Future Party". Head of the Volyn regional branch of the "For the Future" party.

2016 — elected as a deputy of the Verkhovna Rada of Ukraine of the 8th convocation in the by-elections in District No. 23 (Volyn Oblast), winning 57.8% of the vote. Nominated by the "Ukrainian Union of Patriots - UKROP" party. In the Verkhovna Rada of Ukraine of the 8th convocation, she held the position of the head of the subcommittee on extracurricular, professional (vocational and technical), professional pre-higher education and adult education of the Committee on Science and Education of the Verkhovna Rada of Ukraine.

2015-2016 — Deputy of the Volyn Regional Council of the 7th convocation. Secretary of the Permanent Commission for Education, Science, Information Space, Culture and Language, National and Spiritual Development, Family, Youth, Sports and Tourism.

2014-2015 — Deputy of the Lutsk City Council of the 6th convocation, member of the Education, Science and Culture Commission. In 2014, she ran for the Verkhovna Rada from Ukraine's 22nd electoral district as an independent candidate. With a difference of 28 votes, she took second place, losing to her competitor Ihor Lapin of the People's Front.

2013-2014 — member of the executive committee of the Lutsk City Council.

== Personal life ==
Married, husband: Mykola Oleksandrovych Sorokopud (born in 1962), lawyer. From 2012 to 2017, he was the head of the Qualification and Disciplinary Commission of the Bar of the Volyn Region, which accepts qualification exams and issues certificates to lawyers. She has a son, Orest Sorokopud (born in 1992), and a daughter, Solomiya Sorokopud.

== Research activities ==
Scientific achievements: Author of more than 60 scientific and methodological works, monographs. Member of the editorial boards of scientific publications.

Recent works: educational manual with the title of the Ministry of Education and Culture "Modern Ukrainian literature: styles, generations, creative individualities (2012), "Volyn Philological. Portrait of the Department of Ukrainian Literature in Time" (2012, edited, introduction, article)", scientific monograph "Ukrainian autobiographical prose of the first half of the 20th century: autobiographical discourse" (2014).
