= Andriy Kit =

Ukrainian politician

- Андрій Кіт
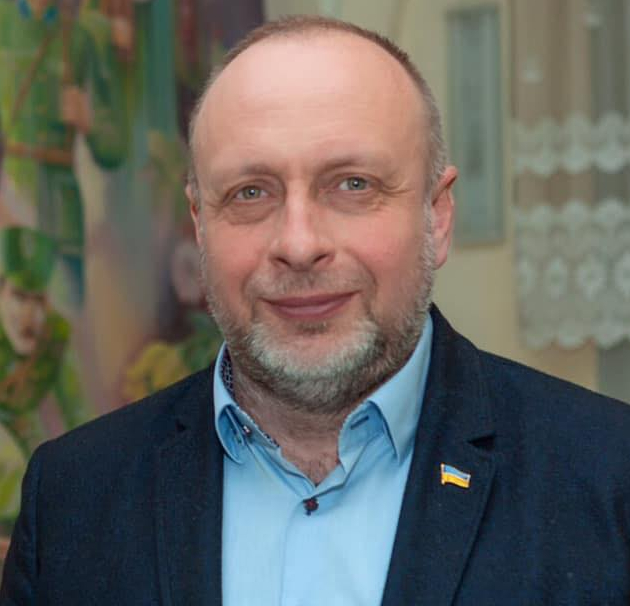

People's Deputy of Ukraine
- Incumbent
- Assumed office 27 November 2014
- Constituency: Lviv Oblast, No. 126

Personal details
- Born: 2 November 1975 (age 49); Lviv, Ukrainian SSR, Soviet Union (now Ukraine)
- Education: 1989–1993 - studied at Lviv Polytechnic Institute; 1994–1995 - studied at the Institute of Economics at Nitra Agricultural University in Slovakia

Andriy Bohdanovych Kit (Ukrainian: Андрій Богданович Кіт; born 2 November 1971) is a Ukrainian politician. He is a People's Deputy of Ukraine of the 8th and 9th convocations.

== Political activity ==
In 2010, he became a deputy of the Lviv Regional Council from the Strong Ukraine party. He was elected for the majority constituency in Zhydachiv district of Lviv region as a member of the UDAR political party.

In the 2012 parliamentary elections, he was a candidate for the People's Deputies of Ukraine from the single-mandate constituency No. 126 (Lviv region) from UDAR. He took second place, receiving 25.04% of the vote.

In November 2014 he was a member of the Verkhovna Rada of the eighth convocation on OVO No. 126 (Lviv region). In the same constituency, he won as a self-nominated candidate in the early parliamentary elections in 2019.

On December 6, 2019, he became a member of the parliamentary group "Trust" (Довіра, - ukr) in the Verkhovna Rada of the 9th convocation.

Engaged in impersonal voting.
