= Ivan Franko Zhytomyr State University =

University in Ukraine

- НЗВО «Житомирський державний університет імені Івана Франка»
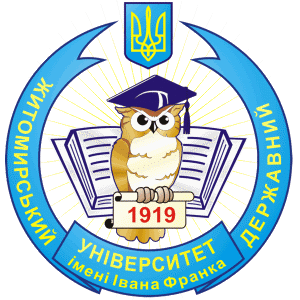
- Established: 1919
- Affiliations: University of Warsaw and Ukrainian Universities Consortium; Eastern European Network of Universities*International Consortium of Universities; Consortium of African and Mediterranean Universities; Black Sea Universities Network (BSUN)
- Address: 10008, Zhytomyr, Velyka Berdychyvska str., 40, Zhytomyr, Ukraine; 50.24929221138736°N 28.674372958456843°E
- Website: zu.edu.ua/en_index.html

The Ivan Franko Zhytomyr State University (Ukrainian: Житомирський державний університет імені Івана Франка) established in 1919, is the oldest public university in the Zhytomyr Oblast of Ukraine. The University participates in the Fulbright Program. Its research infrastructure includes over 17 scientific schools, 20 research centres, and approximately 30 laboratories focused on scientific and methodological inquiry. The institution maintains academic partnerships with more than 40 universities internationally. The university also publishes an academic journal called the "Zhytomyr Ivan Franko State University Journal". This university is named after Ivan Franko.

The university is organized into three institutes and five schools, offering academic programs in a range of disciplines including;

- foreign language and philology
- education
- journalism
- history
- natural sciences
- physical education and sports
- physics and mathematics
- psychology

== See also ==
- List of universities in Ukraine
