= 2025–26 PlusLiga =

Polish volleyball league

- League: PlusLiga
- Sport: Volleyball
- Duration: 20 October 2025 – 10 May 2026
- Games: 208
- Teams: 14
- TV partner: Polsat Sport
- League champions: Warta Zawiercie (1st title)

Seasons
- 2024–25 2026–27

The 2025–26 PlusLiga was the 90th season of the Polish Volleyball Championship, the 73rd season of the highest tier domestic division in the Polish volleyball league system since its establishment in 1954, and the 26th season as a professional league. The league is operated by the Polish Volleyball League SA (Polish: Polska Liga Siatkówki SA).

This season was composed of 14 teams. The regular season was played as a round-robin tournament. Each team played a total of 26 matches, half at home and half away. The season started on 20 October 2025 and concluded on 10 May 2026.

== Regular season ==
Ranking system:

1. Points
2. Number of victories
3. Set ratio
4. Setpoint ratio
5. H2H results

| Result | Winners | Losers |
|---|---|---|
| 3–0 | 3 points | 0 points |
| 3–1 | 3 points | 0 points |
| 3–2 | 2 points | 1 point |

| Pos | Team | Pld | W | L | Pts | SW | SL | SR | SPW | SPL | SPR | Qualification or relegation |
|---|---|---|---|---|---|---|---|---|---|---|---|---|
| 1 | Aluron CMC Warta Zawiercie | 26 | 21 | 5 | 61 | 68 | 27 | 2.519 | 2234 | 1993 | 1.121 | Quarterfinals |
| 2 | PGE Projekt Warsaw | 26 | 19 | 7 | 54 | 60 | 33 | 1.818 | 2187 | 2067 | 1.058 | Quarterfinals |
| 3 | Bogdanka LUK Lublin | 26 | 18 | 8 | 53 | 64 | 40 | 1.600 | 2404 | 2200 | 1.093 | Quarterfinals |
| 4 | Asseco Resovia | 26 | 18 | 8 | 51 | 61 | 36 | 1.694 | 2254 | 2104 | 1.071 | Quarterfinals |
| 5 | Indykpol AZS Olsztyn | 26 | 16 | 10 | 46 | 60 | 48 | 1.250 | 2409 | 2395 | 1.006 | Quarterfinals |
| 6 | PGE GiEK Skra Bełchatów | 26 | 15 | 11 | 44 | 52 | 46 | 1.130 | 2263 | 2223 | 1.018 | Quarterfinals |
| 7 | Jastrzębski Węgiel | 26 | 15 | 11 | 42 | 52 | 47 | 1.106 | 2248 | 2224 | 1.011 | Quarterfinals |
| 8 | ZAKSA Kędzierzyn-Koźle | 26 | 12 | 14 | 40 | 59 | 57 | 1.035 | 2608 | 2563 | 1.018 | Quarterfinals |
| 9 | Energa Trefl Gdańsk | 26 | 14 | 12 | 39 | 55 | 52 | 1.058 | 2400 | 2348 | 1.022 | |
| 10 | Ślepsk Malow Suwałki | 26 | 8 | 18 | 28 | 41 | 63 | 0.651 | 2230 | 2359 | 0.945 | |
| 11 | Barkom-Kazhany Lviv | 26 | 8 | 18 | 24 | 39 | 66 | 0.591 | 2202 | 2411 | 0.913 | |
| 12 | Cuprum Stilon Gorzów | 26 | 7 | 19 | 24 | 39 | 63 | 0.619 | 2254 | 2367 | 0.952 | |
| 13 | Inpost ChKS Chełm | 26 | 7 | 19 | 23 | 32 | 65 | 0.492 | 2049 | 2306 | 0.889 | |
| 14 | Norwid Częstochowa | 26 | 4 | 22 | 17 | 32 | 71 | 0.451 | 2240 | 2422 | 0.925 | Relegation |

Source: PlusLiga

=== 1st round ===
| Date | Time | | Score | | Set 1 | Set 2 | Set 3 | Set 4 | Set 5 | Total | Report |
|---|---|---|---|---|---|---|---|---|---|---|---|
| 20 Oct | 17:30 | Energa Trefl Gdańsk | 3–2 | Barkom-Kazhany Lviv | 19–25 | 25–20 | 20–25 | 25–19 | 15–8 | 104–97 | |
| 21 Oct | 17:30 | Ślepsk Malow Suwałki | 1–3 | Asseco Resovia | 25–17 | 16–25 | 17–25 | 18–25 | | 76–92 | |
| 21 Oct | 20:30 | PGE Projekt Warsaw | 3–0 | Inpost ChKS Chełm | 25–23 | 25–22 | 25–23 | | | 75–68 | |
| 22 Oct | 17:30 | Indykpol AZS Olsztyn | 2–3 | Jastrzębski Węgiel | 23–25 | 25–19 | 25–17 | 18–25 | 11–15 | 102–101 | |
| 22 Oct | 20:30 | Norwid Częstochowa | 0–3 | Bogdanka LUK Lublin | 16–25 | 26–28 | 17–25 | | | 59–78 | |
| 29 Oct | 17:30 | ZAKSA Kędzierzyn-Koźle | 1–3 | Aluron CMC Warta Zawiercie | 22–25 | 25–20 | 24–26 | 23–25 | | 94–96 | |
| 29 Oct | 20:30 | Cuprum Stilon Gorzów | 0–3 | PGE GiEK Skra Bełchatów | 22–25 | 17–25 | 26–28 | | | 65–78 | |

=== 2nd round ===
| Date | Time | | Score | | Set 1 | Set 2 | Set 3 | Set 4 | Set 5 | Total | Report |
|---|---|---|---|---|---|---|---|---|---|---|---|
| 25 Oct | 14:45 | Aluron CMC Warta Zawiercie | 0–3 | PGE Projekt Warsaw | 20–25 | 23–25 | 19–25 | | | 62–75 | |
| 25 Oct | 17:30 | Bogdanka LUK Lublin | 3–2 | ZAKSA Kędzierzyn-Koźle | 21–25 | 25–23 | 25–20 | 23–25 | 15–10 | 109–103 | |
| 25 Oct | 20:30 | PGE GiEK Skra Bełchatów | 2–3 | Indykpol AZS Olsztyn | 25–21 | 18–25 | 25–17 | 19–25 | 16–18 | 103–106 | |
| 26 Oct | 14:45 | Jastrzębski Węgiel | 3–0 | Ślepsk Malow Suwałki | 25–20 | 25–17 | 33–31 | | | 83–68 | |
| 26 Oct | 17:30 | Asseco Resovia | 3–2 | Energa Trefl Gdańsk | 25–19 | 23–25 | 23–25 | 25–23 | 15–13 | 111–105 | |
| 26 Oct | 20:30 | Inpost ChKS Chełm | 3–2 | Cuprum Stilon Gorzów | 14–25 | 25–22 | 25–22 | 8–25 | 15–13 | 87–107 | |
| 28 Oct | 17:30 | Barkom-Kazhany Lviv | 3–2 | Norwid Częstochowa | 24–26 | 25–23 | 25–20 | 21–25 | 15–11 | 110–105 | |

=== 3rd round ===
| Date | Time | | Score | | Set 1 | Set 2 | Set 3 | Set 4 | Set 5 | Total | Report |
|---|---|---|---|---|---|---|---|---|---|---|---|
| 31 Oct | 20:30 | Ślepsk Malow Suwałki | 0–3 | Energa Trefl Gdańsk | 22–25 | 23–25 | 23–25 | | | 68–75 | |
| 1 Nov | 14:45 | Jastrzębski Węgiel | 0–3 | PGE Projekt Warsaw | 19–25 | 23–25 | 22–25 | | | 64–75 | |
| 1 Nov | 17:30 | Asseco Resovia | 3–0 | Cuprum Stilon Gorzów | 25–22 | 25–18 | 25–23 | | | 75–63 | |
| 1 Nov | 20:30 | Aluron CMC Warta Zawiercie | 3–0 | Norwid Częstochowa | 25–17 | 25–22 | 27–25 | | | 77–64 | |
| 2 Nov | 20:30 | Inpost ChKS Chełm | 0–3 | Bogdanka LUK Lublin | 22–25 | 14–25 | 19–25 | | | 55–75 | |
| 3 Nov | 17:30 | PGE GiEK Skra Bełchatów | 3–2 | ZAKSA Kędzierzyn-Koźle | 21–25 | 21–25 | 26–24 | 27–25 | 15–13 | 110–112 | |
| 3 Nov | 20:30 | Barkom-Kazhany Lviv | 1–3 | Indykpol AZS Olsztyn | 25–21 | 19–25 | 25–27 | 23–25 | | 92–98 | |

=== 4th round ===
| Date | Time | | Score | | Set 1 | Set 2 | Set 3 | Set 4 | Set 5 | Total | Report |
|---|---|---|---|---|---|---|---|---|---|---|---|
| 6 Nov | 17:30 | Indykpol AZS Olsztyn | 3–1 | Energa Trefl Gdańsk | 21–25 | 25–23 | 25–21 | 25–21 | | 96–90 | |
| 6 Nov | 20:30 | PGE Projekt Warsaw | 0–3 | Asseco Resovia | 22–25 | 22–25 | 24–26 | | | 68–76 | |
| 8 Nov | 14:45 | ZAKSA Kędzierzyn-Koźle | 3–0 | Jastrzębski Węgiel | 25–16 | 25–23 | 27–25 | | | 77–64 | |
| 8 Nov | 17:30 | Aluron CMC Warta Zawiercie | 3–0 | Inpost ChKS Chełm | 25–21 | 25–20 | 25–22 | | | 75–63 | |
| 9 Nov | 14:45 | Bogdanka LUK Lublin | 1–3 | PGE GiEK Skra Bełchatów | 20–25 | 24–26 | 25–19 | 26–28 | | 95–98 | |
| 9 Nov | 17:30 | Norwid Częstochowa | 3–2 | Ślepsk Malow Suwałki | 25–18 | 23–25 | 25–21 | 20–25 | 15–12 | 108–101 | |
| 2 Dec | 20:00 | Barkom-Kazhany Lviv | 2–3 | Cuprum Stilon Gorzów | 25–23 | 25–22 | 26–28 | 17–25 | 18–20 | 111–118 | |

=== 5th round ===
| Date | Time | | Score | | Set 1 | Set 2 | Set 3 | Set 4 | Set 5 | Total | Report |
|---|---|---|---|---|---|---|---|---|---|---|---|
| 11 Nov | 17:30 | Barkom-Kazhany Lviv | 3–0 | PGE Projekt Warsaw | 25–23 | 25–23 | 26–24 | | | 76–70 | |
| 11 Nov | 20:30 | Energa Trefl Gdańsk | 3–2 | Cuprum Stilon Gorzów | 25–21 | 21–25 | 23–25 | 25–21 | 18–16 | 112–108 | |
| 12 Nov | 17:30 | Ślepsk Malow Suwałki | 0–3 | Indykpol AZS Olsztyn | 21–25 | 20–25 | 15–25 | | | 56–75 | |
| 18 Nov | 17:30 | Inpost ChKS Chełm | 3–1 | Norwid Częstochowa | 25–19 | 25–21 | 20–25 | 25–23 | | 95–88 | |
| 19 Nov | 17:30 | Jastrzębski Węgiel | 1–3 | Bogdanka LUK Lublin | 15–25 | 28–26 | 26–28 | 17–25 | | 86–104 | |
| 19 Nov | 20:00 | Asseco Resovia | 2–3 | ZAKSA Kędzierzyn-Koźle | 25–21 | 15–25 | 20–25 | 25–22 | 12–15 | 97–108 | |
| 3 Dec | 20:00 | PGE GiEK Skra Bełchatów | 3–1 | Aluron CMC Warta Zawiercie | 28–26 | 27–29 | 28–26 | 25–18 | | 108–99 | |

=== 6th round ===
| Date | Time | | Score | | Set 1 | Set 2 | Set 3 | Set 4 | Set 5 | Total | Report |
|---|---|---|---|---|---|---|---|---|---|---|---|
| 15 Nov | 14:45 | Aluron CMC Warta Zawiercie | 2–3 | Jastrzębski Węgiel | 16–25 | 26–24 | 25–19 | 23–25 | 11–15 | 101–108 | |
| 15 Nov | 17:30 | Norwid Częstochowa | 0–3 | Indykpol AZS Olsztyn | 16–25 | 19–25 | 22–25 | | | 57–75 | |
| 15 Nov | 20:00 | ZAKSA Kędzierzyn-Koźle | 3–2 | Barkom-Kazhany Lviv | 25–19 | 21–25 | 25–15 | 23–25 | 15–6 | 109–90 | |
| 16 Nov | 14:45 | Bogdanka LUK Lublin | 2–3 | Asseco Resovia | 25–20 | 25–19 | 23–25 | 22–25 | 13–15 | 108–104 | |
| 16 Nov | 17:30 | Inpost ChKS Chełm | 0–3 | PGE GiEK Skra Bełchatów | 19–25 | 20–25 | 15–25 | | | 54–75 | |
| 16 Nov | 20:00 | PGE Projekt Warsaw | 3–0 | Energa Trefl Gdańsk | 33–31 | 25–19 | 25–22 | | | 83–72 | |
| 17 Nov | 20:00 | Cuprum Stilon Gorzów | 2–3 | Ślepsk Malow Suwałki | 21–25 | 25–23 | 28–26 | 27–29 | 13–15 | 114–118 | |

=== 7th round ===
| Date | Time | | Score | | Set 1 | Set 2 | Set 3 | Set 4 | Set 5 | Total | Report |
|---|---|---|---|---|---|---|---|---|---|---|---|
| 21 Nov | 20:00 | PGE GiEK Skra Bełchatów | 3–1 | Norwid Częstochowa | 25–23 | 21–25 | 25–19 | 26–24 | | 97–91 | |
| 22 Nov | 14:45 | Asseco Resovia | 0–3 | Aluron CMC Warta Zawiercie | 17–25 | 22–25 | 19–25 | | | 58–75 | |
| 22 Nov | 17:30 | Jastrzębski Węgiel | 3–1 | Inpost ChKS Chełm | 23–25 | 25–23 | 25–23 | 25–18 | | 98–89 | |
| 23 Nov | 14:45 | Indykpol AZS Olsztyn | 3–0 | Cuprum Stilon Gorzów | 32–30 | 25–20 | 25–19 | | | 82–69 | |
| 23 Nov | 17:30 | PGE Projekt Warsaw | 3–2 | Ślepsk Malow Suwałki | 23–25 | 25–18 | 21–25 | 25–20 | 15–11 | 109–99 | |
| 23 Nov | 20:00 | Barkom-Kazhany Lviv | 1–3 | Bogdanka LUK Lublin | 19–25 | 23–25 | 28–26 | 20–25 | | 90–101 | |
| 24 Nov | 17:30 | Energa Trefl Gdańsk | 3–2 | ZAKSA Kędzierzyn-Koźle | 25–21 | 26–24 | 19–25 | 19–25 | 15–13 | 104–108 | |

=== 8th round ===
| Date | Time | | Score | | Set 1 | Set 2 | Set 3 | Set 4 | Set 5 | Total | Report |
|---|---|---|---|---|---|---|---|---|---|---|---|
| 25 Nov | 17:30 | PGE GiEK Skra Bełchatów | 3–1 | Jastrzębski Węgiel | 21–25 | 25–22 | 25–13 | 25–21 | | 96–81 | |
| 25 Nov | 20:00 | Aluron CMC Warta Zawiercie | 3–0 | Barkom-Kazhany Lviv | 25–20 | 25–20 | 25–22 | | | 75–62 | |
| 26 Nov | 17:30 | PGE Projekt Warsaw | 3–2 | Indykpol AZS Olsztyn | 30–28 | 25–19 | 23–25 | 22–25 | 15–9 | 115–106 | |
| 26 Nov | 20:00 | Norwid Częstochowa | 2–3 | Cuprum Stilon Gorzów | 25–21 | 25–21 | 23–25 | 18–25 | 13–15 | 104–107 | |
| 2 Dec | 17:30 | Inpost ChKS Chełm | 0–3 | Asseco Resovia | 17–25 | 24–26 | 24–26 | | | 65–77 | |
| 3 Dec | 17:30 | Bogdanka LUK Lublin | 3–1 | Energa Trefl Gdańsk | 25–17 | 25–18 | 27–29 | 25–20 | | 102–84 | |
| 4 Dec | 17:30 | ZAKSA Kędzierzyn-Koźle | 3–2 | Ślepsk Malow Suwałki | 21–25 | 19–25 | 25–19 | 25–22 | 15–10 | 105–101 | |

=== 9th round ===
| Date | Time | | Score | | Set 1 | Set 2 | Set 3 | Set 4 | Set 5 | Total | Report |
|---|---|---|---|---|---|---|---|---|---|---|---|
| 28 Nov | 20:00 | Inpost ChKS Chełm | 2–3 | Barkom-Kazhany Lviv | 25–19 | 23–25 | 25–23 | 23–25 | 9–15 | 105–107 | |
| 29 Nov | 14:45 | Asseco Resovia | 3–0 | PGE GiEK Skra Bełchatów | 25–16 | 25–22 | 25–14 | | | 75–52 | |
| 29 Nov | 20:00 | Ślepsk Malow Suwałki | 0–3 | Bogdanka LUK Lublin | 21–25 | 18–25 | 19–25 | | | 58–75 | |
| 30 Nov | 14:45 | Cuprum Stilon Gorzów | 0–3 | PGE Projekt Warsaw | 26–28 | 23–25 | 19–25 | | | 68–78 | |
| 30 Nov | 17:30 | Energa Trefl Gdańsk | 3–2 | Aluron CMC Warta Zawiercie | 25–16 | 25–27 | 25–23 | 17–25 | 15–9 | 107–100 | |
| 30 Nov | 20:00 | Indykpol AZS Olsztyn | 3–2 | ZAKSA Kędzierzyn-Koźle | 20–25 | 20–25 | 25–21 | 25–14 | 15–13 | 105–98 | |
| 1 Dec | 17:30 | Jastrzębski Węgiel | 3–2 | Norwid Częstochowa | 20–25 | 25–22 | 26–24 | 19–25 | 15–12 | 105–108 | |

=== 10th round ===
| Date | Time | | Score | | Set 1 | Set 2 | Set 3 | Set 4 | Set 5 | Total | Report |
|---|---|---|---|---|---|---|---|---|---|---|---|
| 5 Dec | 20:00 | Inpost ChKS Chełm | 0–3 | Energa Trefl Gdańsk | 15–25 | 19–25 | 14–25 | | | 48–75 | |
| 6 Dec | 12:30 | Aluron CMC Warta Zawiercie | 3–0 | Ślepsk Malow Suwałki | 25–14 | 25–19 | 25–18 | | | 75–51 | |
| 6 Dec | 14:45 | Norwid Częstochowa | 0–3 | PGE Projekt Warsaw | 23–25 | 17–25 | 23–25 | | | 63–75 | |
| 6 Dec | 17:30 | Jastrzębski Węgiel | 3–0 | Asseco Resovia | 25–20 | 25–17 | 25–22 | | | 75–59 | |
| 6 Dec | 20:00 | Bogdanka LUK Lublin | 3–0 | Indykpol AZS Olsztyn | 25–18 | 25–17 | 25–17 | | | 75–52 | |
| 7 Dec | 14:45 | ZAKSA Kędzierzyn-Koźle | 3–1 | Cuprum Stilon Gorzów | 27–25 | 21–25 | 25–20 | 25–19 | | 98–89 | |
| 7 Dec | 20:00 | PGE GiEK Skra Bełchatów | 3–1 | Barkom-Kazhany Lviv | 25–16 | 25–19 | 23–25 | 28–26 | | 101–86 | |

=== 11th round ===
| Date | Time | | Score | | Set 1 | Set 2 | Set 3 | Set 4 | Set 5 | Total | Report |
|---|---|---|---|---|---|---|---|---|---|---|---|
| 18 Nov | 20:00 | Indykpol AZS Olsztyn | 2–3 | Aluron CMC Warta Zawiercie | 20–25 | 25–17 | 23–25 | 25–22 | 10–15 | 103–104 | |
| 11 Dec | 17:30 | Energa Trefl Gdańsk | 3–0 | PGE GiEK Skra Bełchatów | 25–17 | 25–22 | 25–21 | | | 75–60 | |
| 13 Dec | 14:45 | Asseco Resovia | 3–1 | Norwid Częstochowa | 25–19 | 25–22 | 27–29 | 25–19 | | 102–89 | |
| 13 Dec | 17:30 | Barkom-Kazhany Lviv | 0–3 | Jastrzębski Węgiel | 19–25 | 17–25 | 23–25 | | | 59–75 | |
| 13 Dec | 20:00 | Ślepsk Malow Suwałki | 3–0 | Inpost ChKS Chełm | 25–23 | 25–18 | 25–18 | | | 75–59 | |
| 14 Dec | 14:45 | Cuprum Stilon Gorzów | 2–3 | Bogdanka LUK Lublin | 25–23 | 25–27 | 25–20 | 20–25 | 12–15 | 107–110 | |
| 14 Dec | 17:30 | PGE Projekt Warsaw | 3–1 | ZAKSA Kędzierzyn-Koźle | 25–23 | 25–16 | 21–25 | 25–20 | | 96–84 | |

=== 12th round ===
| Date | Time | | Score | | Set 1 | Set 2 | Set 3 | Set 4 | Set 5 | Total | Report |
|---|---|---|---|---|---|---|---|---|---|---|---|
| 4 Nov | 17:30 | Cuprum Stilon Gorzów | 0–3 | Aluron CMC Warta Zawiercie | 15–25 | 18–25 | 19–25 | | | 52–75 | |
| 16 Dec | 17:30 | PGE GiEK Skra Bełchatów | 3–1 | Ślepsk Malow Suwałki | 25–27 | 25–14 | 25–21 | 25–16 | | 100–78 | |
| 16 Dec | 20:00 | Jastrzębski Węgiel | 3–1 | Energa Trefl Gdańsk | 25–23 | 25–18 | 23–25 | 25–23 | | 98–89 | |
| 17 Dec | 17:30 | Norwid Częstochowa | 3–1 | ZAKSA Kędzierzyn-Koźle | 25–17 | 23–25 | 25–23 | 25–18 | | 98–83 | |
| 18 Dec | 18:30 | Barkom-Kazhany Lviv | 0–3 | Asseco Resovia | 20–25 | 26–28 | 17–25 | | | 63–78 | |
| 23 Dec | 17:30 | Inpost ChKS Chełm | 2–3 | Indykpol AZS Olsztyn | 25–19 | 25–15 | 26–28 | 20–25 | 8–15 | 104–102 | |
| 23 Dec | 20:00 | Bogdanka LUK Lublin | 3–0 | PGE Projekt Warsaw | 27–25 | 25–22 | 25–23 | | | 77–70 | |

=== 13th round ===
| Date | Time | | Score | | Set 1 | Set 2 | Set 3 | Set 4 | Set 5 | Total | Report |
|---|---|---|---|---|---|---|---|---|---|---|---|
| 12 Nov | 20:30 | Aluron CMC Warta Zawiercie | 3–2 | Bogdanka LUK Lublin | 22–25 | 25–20 | 30–28 | 20–25 | 15–11 | 112–109 | |
| 19 Dec | 20:00 | PGE Projekt Warsaw | 3–1 | PGE GiEK Skra Bełchatów | 25–14 | 31–29 | 20–25 | 25–18 | | 101–86 | |
| 20 Dec | 12:30 | Ślepsk Malow Suwałki | 3–1 | Barkom-Kazhany Lviv | 25–20 | 25–23 | 22–25 | 25–20 | | 97–88 | |
| 20 Dec | 14:45 | Indykpol AZS Olsztyn | 3–1 | Asseco Resovia | 25–18 | 14–25 | 27–25 | 25–20 | | 91–88 | |
| 20 Dec | 17:30 | ZAKSA Kędzierzyn-Koźle | 1–3 | Inpost ChKS Chełm | 34–32 | 23–25 | 21–25 | 20–25 | | 98–107 | |
| 21 Dec | 14:45 | Cuprum Stilon Gorzów | 1–3 | Jastrzębski Węgiel | 23–25 | 25–21 | 21–25 | 18–25 | | 87–96 | |
| 21 Dec | 17:30 | Norwid Częstochowa | 0–3 | Energa Trefl Gdańsk | 12–25 | 20–25 | 19–25 | | | 51–75 | |

=== 14th round ===
| Date | Time | | Score | | Set 1 | Set 2 | Set 3 | Set 4 | Set 5 | Total | Report |
|---|---|---|---|---|---|---|---|---|---|---|---|
| 21 Mar | 14:45 | Aluron CMC Warta Zawiercie | 3–2 | ZAKSA Kędzierzyn-Koźle | 23–25 | 25–21 | 25–20 | 23–25 | 15–13 | 111–104 | |
| 21 Mar | 17:30 | Inpost ChKS Chełm | 0–3 | PGE Projekt Warsaw | 21–25 | 21–25 | 19–25 | | | 61–75 | |
| 21 Mar | 20:00 | Bogdanka LUK Lublin | 3–0 | Norwid Częstochowa | 25–14 | 25–13 | 25–21 | | | 75–48 | |
| 22 Mar | 14:45 | Jastrzębski Węgiel | 3–1 | Indykpol AZS Olsztyn | 20–25 | 25–17 | 25–19 | 25–18 | | 95–79 | |
| 22 Mar | 17:30 | Asseco Resovia | 3–0 | Ślepsk Malow Suwałki | 25–22 | 25–21 | 25–20 | | | 75–63 | |
| 22 Mar | 20:00 | PGE GiEK Skra Bełchatów | 3–1 | Cuprum Stilon Gorzów | 25–27 | 25–17 | 25–19 | 25–22 | | 100–85 | |
| 23 Mar | 17:30 | Barkom-Kazhany Lviv | 0–3 | Energa Trefl Gdańsk | 21–25 | 20–25 | 16–25 | | | 57–75 | |

=== 15th round ===
| Date | Time | | Score | | Set 1 | Set 2 | Set 3 | Set 4 | Set 5 | Total | Report |
|---|---|---|---|---|---|---|---|---|---|---|---|
| 2 Jan | 17:30 | Energa Trefl Gdańsk | 3–1 | Asseco Resovia | 23–25 | 26–24 | 25–19 | 27–25 | | 101–93 | |
| 3 Jan | 14:45 | PGE Projekt Warsaw | 3–0 | Aluron CMC Warta Zawiercie | 25–21 | 25–20 | 25–23 | | | 75–64 | |
| 3 Jan | 17:30 | ZAKSA Kędzierzyn-Koźle | 2–3 | Bogdanka LUK Lublin | 25–22 | 22–25 | 19–25 | 25–21 | 11–15 | 102–108 | |
| 3 Jan | 20:00 | Norwid Częstochowa | 3–1 | Barkom-Kazhany Lviv | 25–21 | 21–25 | 25–15 | 25–20 | | 96–81 | |
| 4 Jan | 17:30 | Ślepsk Malow Suwałki | 3–0 | Jastrzębski Węgiel | 26–24 | 25–23 | 27–25 | | | 78–72 | |
| 5 Jan | 17:30 | Cuprum Stilon Gorzów | 3–0 | Inpost ChKS Chełm | 25–20 | 25–18 | 25–20 | | | 75–58 | |
| 4 Mar | 17:30 | Indykpol AZS Olsztyn | 3–1 | PGE GiEK Skra Bełchatów | 25–23 | 19–25 | 25–21 | 25–22 | | 94–91 | |

=== 16th round ===
| Date | Time | | Score | | Set 1 | Set 2 | Set 3 | Set 4 | Set 5 | Total | Report |
|---|---|---|---|---|---|---|---|---|---|---|---|
| 6 Jan | 15:00 | Indykpol AZS Olsztyn | 3–2 | Barkom-Kazhany Lviv | 25–19 | 22–25 | 25–14 | 23–25 | 20–18 | 115–101 | |
| 9 Jan | 20:00 | Energa Trefl Gdańsk | 3–2 | Ślepsk Malow Suwałki | 21–25 | 21–25 | 25–23 | 25–14 | 22–20 | 114–107 | |
| 13 Jan | 17:30 | ZAKSA Kędzierzyn-Koźle | 3–1 | PGE GiEK Skra Bełchatów | 19–25 | 31–29 | 25–21 | 25–18 | | 100–93 | |
| 13 Jan | 20:00 | Bogdanka LUK Lublin | 1–3 | Inpost ChKS Chełm | 17–25 | 25–20 | 23–25 | 27–29 | | 92–99 | |
| 14 Jan | 20:00 | PGE Projekt Warsaw | 3–1 | Jastrzębski Węgiel | 20–25 | 25–23 | 25–23 | 25–19 | | 95–90 | |
| 15 Jan | 20:00 | Cuprum Stilon Gorzów | 0–3 | Asseco Resovia | 23–25 | 19–25 | 19–25 | | | 61–75 | |
| 4 Feb | 20:00 | Norwid Częstochowa | 0–3 | Aluron CMC Warta Zawiercie | 22–25 | 19–25 | 21–25 | | | 62–75 | |

=== 17th round ===
| Date | Time | | Score | | Set 1 | Set 2 | Set 3 | Set 4 | Set 5 | Total | Report |
|---|---|---|---|---|---|---|---|---|---|---|---|
| 16 Jan | 17:30 | Ślepsk Malow Suwałki | 3–1 | Norwid Częstochowa | 25–22 | 25–18 | 22–25 | 25–18 | | 97–83 | |
| 16 Jan | 20:00 | Inpost ChKS Chełm | 0–3 | Aluron CMC Warta Zawiercie | 18–25 | 14–25 | 19–25 | | | 51–75 | |
| 17 Jan | 14:45 | PGE GiEK Skra Bełchatów | 0–3 | Bogdanka LUK Lublin | 20–25 | 19–25 | 16–25 | | | 55–75 | |
| 17 Jan | 17:30 | Jastrzębski Węgiel | 2–3 | ZAKSA Kędzierzyn-Koźle | 23–25 | 25–23 | 25–23 | 20–25 | 17–19 | 110–115 | |
| 17 Jan | 20:00 | Cuprum Stilon Gorzów | 3–0 | Barkom-Kazhany Lviv | 25–21 | 25–21 | 29–27 | | | 79–69 | |
| 18 Jan | 14:45 | Asseco Resovia | 3–0 | PGE Projekt Warsaw | 25–23 | 25–21 | 25–14 | | | 75–58 | |
| 18 Jan | 17:30 | Energa Trefl Gdańsk | 2–3 | Indykpol AZS Olsztyn | 17–25 | 21–25 | 25–21 | 26–24 | 16–18 | 105–113 | |

=== 18th round ===
| Date | Time | | Score | | Set 1 | Set 2 | Set 3 | Set 4 | Set 5 | Total | Report |
|---|---|---|---|---|---|---|---|---|---|---|---|
| 22 Jan | 20:15 | Cuprum Stilon Gorzów | 2–3 | Energa Trefl Gdańsk | 26–24 | 25–19 | 17–25 | 19–25 | 9–15 | 96–108 | |
| 24 Jan | 14:45 | Aluron CMC Warta Zawiercie | 3–0 | PGE GiEK Skra Bełchatów | 25–19 | 25–14 | 25–22 | | | 75–55 | |
| 24 Jan | 17:30 | ZAKSA Kędzierzyn-Koźle | 3–1 | Asseco Resovia | 26–24 | 19–25 | 25–22 | 25–22 | | 95–93 | |
| 24 Jan | 20:00 | PGE Projekt Warsaw | 2–3 | Barkom-Kazhany Lviv | 19–25 | 20–25 | 25–21 | 25–23 | 13–15 | 102–109 | |
| 25 Jan | 14:45 | Bogdanka LUK Lublin | 0–3 | Jastrzębski Węgiel | 21–25 | 21–25 | 16–25 | | | 58–75 | |
| 26 Jan | 17:30 | Norwid Częstochowa | 1–3 | Inpost ChKS Chełm | 25–22 | 27–29 | 23–25 | 24–26 | | 99–102 | |
| 27 Jan | 20:00 | Indykpol AZS Olsztyn | 1–3 | Ślepsk Malow Suwałki | 25–22 | 21–25 | 19–25 | 21–25 | | 86–97 | |

=== 19th round ===
| Date | Time | | Score | | Set 1 | Set 2 | Set 3 | Set 4 | Set 5 | Total | Report |
|---|---|---|---|---|---|---|---|---|---|---|---|
| 30 Jan | 17:30 | PGE GiEK Skra Bełchatów | 1–3 | Inpost ChKS Chełm | 25–12 | 22–25 | 24–26 | 23–25 | | 94–88 | |
| 30 Jan | 20:00 | Barkom-Kazhany Lviv | 3–2 | ZAKSA Kędzierzyn-Koźle | 21–25 | 23–25 | 25–14 | 25–23 | 15–11 | 109–98 | |
| 31 Jan | 14:45 | Jastrzębski Węgiel | 0–3 | Aluron CMC Warta Zawiercie | 16–25 | 22–25 | 20–25 | | | 58–75 | |
| 1 Feb | 14:45 | Asseco Resovia | 3–2 | Bogdanka LUK Lublin | 20–25 | 25–18 | 25–21 | 22–25 | 15–8 | 107–97 | |
| 1 Feb | 17:30 | Energa Trefl Gdańsk | 0–3 | PGE Projekt Warsaw | 32–34 | 21–25 | 21–25 | | | 74–84 | |
| 1 Feb | 20:00 | Indykpol AZS Olsztyn | 3–2 | Norwid Częstochowa | 23–25 | 25–23 | 25–21 | 30–32 | 20–18 | 123–119 | |
| 2 Feb | 20:00 | Ślepsk Malow Suwałki | 0–3 | Cuprum Stilon Gorzów | 21–25 | 23–25 | 22–25 | | | 66–75 | |

=== 20th round ===
| Date | Time | | Score | | Set 1 | Set 2 | Set 3 | Set 4 | Set 5 | Total | Report |
|---|---|---|---|---|---|---|---|---|---|---|---|
| 5 Feb | 17:30 | Inpost ChKS Chełm | 2–3 | Jastrzębski Węgiel | 17–25 | 17–25 | 25–22 | 25–17 | 12–15 | 96–104 | |
| 6 Feb | 17:30 | Ślepsk Malow Suwałki | 2–3 | PGE Projekt Warsaw | 25–20 | 20–25 | 25–20 | 21–25 | 10–15 | 101–105 | |
| 6 Feb | 20:00 | Bogdanka LUK Lublin | 2–3 | Barkom-Kazhany Lviv | 22–25 | 25–17 | 21–25 | 25–19 | 12–15 | 105–101 | |
| 7 Feb | 12:30 | ZAKSA Kędzierzyn-Koźle | 3–2 | Energa Trefl Gdańsk | 25–20 | 22–25 | 25–15 | 17–25 | 15–12 | 104–97 | |
| 7 Feb | 20:30 | Aluron CMC Warta Zawiercie | 3–1 | Asseco Resovia | 25–23 | 19–25 | 34–32 | 25–22 | | 103–102 | |
| 8 Feb | 18:00 | Cuprum Stilon Gorzów | 0–3 | Indykpol AZS Olsztyn | 21–25 | 18–25 | 21–25 | | | 60–75 | |
| 11 Mar | 17:30 | Norwid Częstochowa | 0–3 | PGE GiEK Skra Bełchatów | 30–32 | 25–27 | 21–25 | | | 76–84 | |

=== 21st round ===
| Date | Time | | Score | | Set 1 | Set 2 | Set 3 | Set 4 | Set 5 | Total | Report |
|---|---|---|---|---|---|---|---|---|---|---|---|
| 11 Feb | 20:00 | Ślepsk Malow Suwałki | 3–2 | ZAKSA Kędzierzyn-Koźle | 23–25 | 15–25 | 25–21 | 25–19 | 21–19 | 109–109 | |
| 13 Feb | 17:30 | Jastrzębski Węgiel | 3–1 | PGE GiEK Skra Bełchatów | 18–25 | 25–23 | 25–22 | 25–19 | | 93–89 | |
| 13 Feb | 20:00 | Cuprum Stilon Gorzów | 3–2 | Norwid Częstochowa | 25–14 | 17–25 | 25–23 | 22–25 | 16–14 | 105–101 | |
| 14 Feb | 14:45 | Barkom-Kazhany Lviv | 0–3 | Aluron CMC Warta Zawiercie | 17–25 | 13–25 | 22–25 | | | 52–75 | |
| 14 Feb | 17:30 | Asseco Resovia | 3–1 | Inpost ChKS Chełm | 25–16 | 25–21 | 18–25 | 25–21 | | 93–83 | |
| 15 Feb | 14:45 | Indykpol AZS Olsztyn | 0–3 | PGE Projekt Warsaw | 21–25 | 19–25 | 24–26 | | | 64–76 | |
| 17 Mar | 20:00 | Energa Trefl Gdańsk | 1–3 | Bogdanka LUK Lublin | 20–25 | 18–25 | 25–17 | 19–25 | | 82–92 | |

=== 22nd round ===
| Date | Time | | Score | | Set 1 | Set 2 | Set 3 | Set 4 | Set 5 | Total | Report |
|---|---|---|---|---|---|---|---|---|---|---|---|
| 20 Feb | 20:00 | ZAKSA Kędzierzyn-Koźle | 1–3 | Indykpol AZS Olsztyn | 25–16 | 28–30 | 22–25 | 33–35 | | 108–106 | |
| 21 Feb | 14:45 | Aluron CMC Warta Zawiercie | 3–2 | Energa Trefl Gdańsk | 25–23 | 21–25 | 24–26 | 25–22 | 15–12 | 110–108 | |
| 21 Feb | 17:30 | Bogdanka LUK Lublin | 3–2 | Ślepsk Malow Suwałki | 21–25 | 27–29 | 25–19 | 25–17 | 15–4 | 113–94 | |
| 21 Feb | 20:00 | Norwid Częstochowa | 3–1 | Jastrzębski Węgiel | 31–29 | 25–20 | 17–25 | 25–20 | | 98–94 | |
| 22 Feb | 14:45 | PGE GiEK Skra Bełchatów | 3–1 | Asseco Resovia | 19–25 | 25–23 | 25–20 | 25–19 | | 94–87 | |
| 22 Feb | 20:00 | Barkom-Kazhany Lviv | 3–1 | Inpost ChKS Chełm | 22–25 | 25–16 | 25–21 | 25–22 | | 97–84 | |
| 23 Feb | 20:00 | PGE Projekt Warsaw | 0–3 | Cuprum Stilon Gorzów | 20–25 | 22–25 | 19–25 | | | 61–75 | |

=== 23rd round ===
| Date | Time | | Score | | Set 1 | Set 2 | Set 3 | Set 4 | Set 5 | Total | Report |
|---|---|---|---|---|---|---|---|---|---|---|---|
| 24 Feb | 17:30 | Indykpol AZS Olsztyn | 1–3 | Bogdanka LUK Lublin | 18–25 | 16–25 | 26–24 | 20–25 | | 80–99 | |
| 24 Feb | 20:00 | Ślepsk Malow Suwałki | 0–3 | Aluron CMC Warta Zawiercie | 23–25 | 19–25 | 17–25 | | | 59–75 | |
| 25 Feb | 17:30 | Energa Trefl Gdańsk | 3–1 | Inpost ChKS Chełm | 25–21 | 26–28 | 25–19 | 25–14 | | 101–82 | |
| 25 Feb | 20:00 | PGE Projekt Warsaw | 3–1 | Norwid Częstochowa | 20–25 | 25–22 | 25–22 | 25–19 | | 95–88 | |
| 17 Mar | 17:30 | Cuprum Stilon Gorzów | 1–3 | ZAKSA Kędzierzyn-Koźle | 20–25 | 20–25 | 41–39 | 20–25 | | 101–114 | |
| 18 Mar | 17:30 | Barkom-Kazhany Lviv | 0–3 | PGE GiEK Skra Bełchatów | 13–25 | 19–25 | 21–25 | | | 53–75 | |
| 19 Mar | 20:00 | Asseco Resovia | 3–0 | Jastrzębski Węgiel | 25–22 | 25–17 | 25–23 | | | 75–62 | |

=== 24th round ===
| Date | Time | | Score | | Set 1 | Set 2 | Set 3 | Set 4 | Set 5 | Total | Report |
|---|---|---|---|---|---|---|---|---|---|---|---|
| 26 Feb | 17:30 | Jastrzębski Węgiel | 1–3 | Barkom-Kazhany Lviv | 25–18 | 21–25 | 18–25 | 23–25 | | 87–93 | |
| 28 Feb | 12:30 | Aluron CMC Warta Zawiercie | 3–1 | Indykpol AZS Olsztyn | 24–26 | 25–12 | 25–22 | 25–23 | | 99–83 | |
| 28 Feb | 14:45 | ZAKSA Kędzierzyn-Koźle | 2–3 | PGE Projekt Warsaw | 18–25 | 25–20 | 25–20 | 25–27 | 10–15 | 103–107 | |
| 28 Feb | 17:30 | Norwid Częstochowa | 1–3 | Asseco Resovia | 21–25 | 25–22 | 20–25 | 31–33 | | 97–105 | |
| 28 Feb | 20:00 | Bogdanka LUK Lublin | 3–2 | Cuprum Stilon Gorzów | 30–28 | 23–25 | 28–30 | 25–23 | 15–11 | 121–117 | |
| 1 Mar | 14:45 | PGE GiEK Skra Bełchatów | 3–1 | Energa Trefl Gdańsk | 31–33 | 25–23 | 25–17 | 25–20 | | 106–93 | |
| 2 Mar | 17:30 | Inpost ChKS Chełm | 3–1 | Ślepsk Malow Suwałki | 27–25 | 19–25 | 25–22 | 25–23 | | 96–95 | |

=== 25th round ===
| Date | Time | | Score | | Set 1 | Set 2 | Set 3 | Set 4 | Set 5 | Total | Report |
|---|---|---|---|---|---|---|---|---|---|---|---|
| 6 Mar | 20:00 | ZAKSA Kędzierzyn-Koźle | 3–1 | Norwid Częstochowa | 25–21 | 25–21 | 23–25 | 25–22 | | 98–89 | |
| 7 Mar | 14:45 | Ślepsk Malow Suwałki | 2–3 | PGE GiEK Skra Bełchatów | 22–25 | 25–14 | 25–19 | 26–28 | 11–15 | 109–101 | |
| 7 Mar | 17:30 | Aluron CMC Warta Zawiercie | 3–1 | Cuprum Stilon Gorzów | 25–19 | 21–25 | 25–18 | 25–17 | | 96–79 | |
| 7 Mar | 20:00 | Asseco Resovia | 3–0 | Barkom-Kazhany Lviv | 25–21 | 25–16 | 25–15 | | | 75–52 | |
| 8 Mar | 14:45 | Energa Trefl Gdańsk | 0–3 | Jastrzębski Węgiel | 23–25 | 23–25 | 21–25 | | | 67–75 | |
| 8 Mar | 17:30 | PGE Projekt Warsaw | 1–3 | Bogdanka LUK Lublin | 29–31 | 21–25 | 25–19 | 12–25 | | 87–100 | |
| 9 Mar | 17:30 | Indykpol AZS Olsztyn | 3–1 | Inpost ChKS Chełm | 23–25 | 25–23 | 25–23 | 25–15 | | 98–86 | |

=== 26th round ===
| Date | Time | | Score | | Set 1 | Set 2 | Set 3 | Set 4 | Set 5 | Total | Report |
|---|---|---|---|---|---|---|---|---|---|---|---|
| 13 Mar | 17:30 | Inpost ChKS Chełm | 0–3 | ZAKSA Kędzierzyn-Koźle | 29–31 | 17–25 | 18–25 | | | 64–81 | |
| 13 Mar | 20:00 | Bogdanka LUK Lublin | 0–3 | Aluron CMC Warta Zawiercie | 19–25 | 16–25 | 16–25 | | | 51–75 | |
| 14 Mar | 14:45 | Jastrzębski Węgiel | 3–1 | Cuprum Stilon Gorzów | 25–21 | 25–22 | 24–26 | 25–23 | | 99–92 | |
| 14 Mar | 20:00 | Energa Trefl Gdańsk | 3–2 | Norwid Częstochowa | 21–25 | 22–25 | 25–23 | 25–16 | 15–10 | 108–99 | |
| 15 Mar | 14:45 | PGE GiEK Skra Bełchatów | 0–3 | PGE Projekt Warsaw | 25–27 | 20–25 | 17–25 | | | 62–77 | |
| 15 Mar | 20:00 | Barkom-Kazhany Lviv | 2–3 | Ślepsk Malow Suwałki | 25–21 | 21–25 | 25–23 | 14–25 | 12–15 | 97–109 | |
| 16 Mar | 17:30 | Asseco Resovia | 3–2 | Indykpol AZS Olsztyn | 25–23 | 23–25 | 19–25 | 25–16 | 15–11 | 107–100 | |

== Playoffs ==
Quarterfinals
Aluron CMC Warta Zawiercie (1) | 2 | 3 | 3
ZAKSA Kędzierzyn-Koźle (8) | 3 | 1 | 1
Indykpol AZS Olsztyn (5) | 0 | 0
Asseco Resovia (4) | 3 | 3
Bogdanka LUK Lublin (3) | 3 | 3
PGE GiEK Skra Bełchatów (6) | 0 | 0
Jastrzębski Węgiel (7) | 0 | 3 | 0
PGE Projekt Warsaw (2) | 3 | 2 | 3

Semifinals
Aluron CMC Warta Zawiercie (1) | 3 | 3
Asseco Resovia (4) | 0 | 0
Bogdanka LUK Lublin (3) | 3 | 3
PGE Projekt Warsaw (2) | 1 | 1

Final
Aluron CMC Warta Zawiercie (1) | 3 | 1 | 0 | 3 | 3
Bogdanka LUK Lublin (3) | 0 | 3 | 3 | 1 | 1

=== Quarterfinals ===
- (to 2 victories)

==== Quarterfinal A ====
| Date | Time | | Score | | Set 1 | Set 2 | Set 3 | Set 4 | Set 5 | Total | Report |
|---|---|---|---|---|---|---|---|---|---|---|---|
| 29 Mar | 14:45 | Aluron CMC Warta Zawiercie | 2–3 | ZAKSA Kędzierzyn-Koźle | 25–22 | 25–22 | 18–25 | 20–25 | 20–22 | 108–116 | |
| 6 Apr | 17:30 | ZAKSA Kędzierzyn-Koźle | 1–3 | Aluron CMC Warta Zawiercie | 22–25 | 25–23 | 23–25 | 23–25 | | 93–98 | |
| 9 Apr | 17:30 | Aluron CMC Warta Zawiercie | 3–1 | ZAKSA Kędzierzyn-Koźle | 25–20 | 25–22 | 22–25 | 25–16 | | 97–83 | |

==== Quarterfinal B ====
| Date | Time | | Score | | Set 1 | Set 2 | Set 3 | Set 4 | Set 5 | Total | Report |
|---|---|---|---|---|---|---|---|---|---|---|---|
| 28 Mar | 14:45 | Asseco Resovia | 3–0 | Indykpol AZS Olsztyn | 25–18 | 25–19 | 25–20 | | | 75–57 | |
| 4 Apr | 14:45 | Indykpol AZS Olsztyn | 0–3 | Asseco Resovia | 18–25 | 26–28 | 14–25 | | | 58–78 | |

==== Quarterfinal C ====
| Date | Time | | Score | | Set 1 | Set 2 | Set 3 | Set 4 | Set 5 | Total | Report |
|---|---|---|---|---|---|---|---|---|---|---|---|
| 28 Mar | 20:00 | Bogdanka LUK Lublin | 3–0 | PGE GiEK Skra Bełchatów | 25–23 | 25–22 | 25–22 | | | 75–67 | |
| 4 Apr | 20:00 | PGE GiEK Skra Bełchatów | 0–3 | Bogdanka LUK Lublin | 24–26 | 21–25 | 22–25 | | | 67–76 | |

==== Quarterfinal D ====
| Date | Time | | Score | | Set 1 | Set 2 | Set 3 | Set 4 | Set 5 | Total | Report |
|---|---|---|---|---|---|---|---|---|---|---|---|
| 27 Mar | 20:00 | PGE Projekt Warsaw | 3–0 | Jastrzębski Węgiel | 25–21 | 25–22 | 25–19 | | | 75–62 | |
| 4 Apr | 17:30 | Jastrzębski Węgiel | 3–2 | PGE Projekt Warsaw | 25–23 | 21–25 | 11–25 | 26–24 | 15–13 | 98–110 | |
| 7 Apr | 20:00 | PGE Projekt Warsaw | 3–0 | Jastrzębski Węgiel | 25–20 | 25–17 | 25–13 | | | 75–50 | |

=== Semifinals ===
- (to 2 victories)

==== Semifinal A ====
| Date | Time | | Score | | Set 1 | Set 2 | Set 3 | Set 4 | Set 5 | Total | Report |
|---|---|---|---|---|---|---|---|---|---|---|---|
| 12 Apr | 17:30 | Aluron CMC Warta Zawiercie | 3–0 | Asseco Resovia | 25–22 | 25–21 | 26–24 | | | 76–67 | |
| 18 Apr | 15:00 | Asseco Resovia | 0–3 | Aluron CMC Warta Zawiercie | 16–25 | 17–25 | 23–25 | | | 56–75 | |

==== Semifinal B ====
| Date | Time | | Score | | Set 1 | Set 2 | Set 3 | Set 4 | Set 5 | Total | Report |
|---|---|---|---|---|---|---|---|---|---|---|---|
| 13 Apr | 20:00 | PGE Projekt Warsaw | 1–3 | Bogdanka LUK Lublin | 27–25 | 14–25 | 24–26 | 22–25 | | 87–101 | |
| 18 Apr | 18:00 | Bogdanka LUK Lublin | 3–1 | PGE Projekt Warsaw | 25–14 | 26–24 | 18–25 | 25–17 | | 94–80 | |

=== Finals ===
- (to 3 victories)

| Date | Time | | Score | | Set 1 | Set 2 | Set 3 | Set 4 | Set 5 | Total | Report |
|---|---|---|---|---|---|---|---|---|---|---|---|
| 25 Apr | 14:45 | Aluron CMC Warta Zawiercie | 3–0 | Bogdanka LUK Lublin | 25–19 | 25–21 | 25–14 | | | 75–54 | |
| 29 Apr | 17:30 | Bogdanka LUK Lublin | 3–1 | Aluron CMC Warta Zawiercie | 21–25 | 25–21 | 25–23 | 29–27 | | 100–96 | |
| 2 May | 14:45 | Aluron CMC Warta Zawiercie | 0–3 | Bogdanka LUK Lublin | 20–25 | 22–25 | 20–25 | | | 62–75 | |
| 6 May | 20:00 | Bogdanka LUK Lublin | 1–3 | Aluron CMC Warta Zawiercie | 26–24 | 20–25 | 23–25 | 20–25 | | 89–99 | |
| 10 May | 14:45 | Aluron CMC Warta Zawiercie | 3–1 | Bogdanka LUK Lublin | 15–25 | 25–21 | 25–14 | 25–21 | | 90–81 | |

== Placement matches ==
=== 5th place ===
- (to 2 victories)

| Date | Time | | Score | | Set 1 | Set 2 | Set 3 | Set 4 | Set 5 | Total | Report |
|---|---|---|---|---|---|---|---|---|---|---|---|
| 14 Apr | 17:30 | Indykpol AZS Olsztyn | 3–2 | PGE GiEK Skra Bełchatów | 25–18 | 23–25 | 22–25 | 25–18 | 18–16 | 113–102 | |
| 17 Apr | 17:30 | PGE GiEK Skra Bełchatów | 3–2 | Indykpol AZS Olsztyn | 22–25 | 20–25 | 25–18 | 25–23 | 15–11 | 107–102 | |
| 20 Apr | 17:30 | Indykpol AZS Olsztyn | 2–3 | PGE GiEK Skra Bełchatów | 28–26 | 20–25 | 18–25 | 28–26 | 13–15 | 107–117 | |

=== 3rd place ===
- (to 3 victories)

| Date | Time | | Score | | Set 1 | Set 2 | Set 3 | Set 4 | Set 5 | Total | Report |
|---|---|---|---|---|---|---|---|---|---|---|---|
| 27 Apr | 20:00 | PGE Projekt Warsaw | 3–2 | Asseco Resovia | 20–25 | 29–27 | 24–26 | 25–19 | 15–11 | 113–108 | |
| 30 Apr | 17:30 | Asseco Resovia | 1–3 | PGE Projekt Warsaw | 18–25 | 14–25 | 25–20 | 18–25 | | 75–95 | |
| 3 May | 14:45 | PGE Projekt Warsaw | 2–3 | Asseco Resovia | 25–21 | 25–22 | 22–25 | 18–25 | 12–15 | 102–108 | |
| 6 May | 17:30 | Asseco Resovia | 0–3 | PGE Projekt Warsaw | 19–25 | 15–25 | 20–25 | | | 54–75 | |

== Final standings ==
| Qualified for the 2026–27 CEV Champions League |
| Qualified for the 2026–27 CEV Cup |
| Qualified for the 2026–27 CEV Challenge Cup |
| Relegation to the 1st league |

| Rank | Team |
|---|---|
| 1st place, gold medalist(s) | Aluron CMC Warta Zawiercie |
| 2nd place, silver medalist(s) | Bogdanka LUK Lublin |
| 3rd place, bronze medalist(s) | PGE Projekt Warsaw |
| 4 | Asseco Resovia |
| 5 | PGE GiEK Skra Bełchatów |
| 6 | Indykpol AZS Olsztyn |
| 7 | Jastrzębski Węgiel |
| 8 | ZAKSA Kędzierzyn-Koźle |
| 9 | Energa Trefl Gdańsk |
| 10 | Ślepsk Malow Suwałki |
| 11 | Barkom-Kazhany Lviv |
| 12 | Cuprum Stilon Gorzów |
| 13 | Inpost ChKS Chełm |
| 14 | Norwid Częstochowa |

== Squads ==
Aluron CMC Warta Zawiercie
| No. | Name | Date of birth | Height | Position |
|---|---|---|---|---|
| 2 | (Poland) Bartosz Kwolek | 17 July 1997 | 1.93 m (6 ft 4 in) | outside hitter |
| 3 | (United States) Aaron Russell | 4 June 1993 | 2.05 m (6 ft 9 in) | outside hitter |
| 5 | (Poland) Miłosz Zniszczoł | 2 July 1986 | 2.00 m (6 ft 7 in) | middle blocker |
| 6 | (Poland) Jakub Czerwiński | 22 July 2001 | 1.95 m (6 ft 5 in) | outside hitter |
| 9 | (Poland) Bartłomiej Bołądź | 28 September 1994 | 2.04 m (6 ft 8 in) | opposite |
| 10 | (Poland) Jakub Popiwczak | 17 April 1996 | 1.80 m (5 ft 11 in) | libero |
| 11 | (Poland) Jakub Nowosielski | 11 February 1993 | 1.93 m (6 ft 4 in) | setter |
| 12 | (Poland) Adrian Markiewicz | 12 April 2002 | 2.13 m (7 ft 0 in) | middle blocker |
| 13 | (Poland) Yuriy Gladyr | 8 July 1984 | 2.02 m (6 ft 8 in) | middle blocker |
| 15 | (Portugal) Miguel Tavares | 2 March 1993 | 1.92 m (6 ft 4 in) | setter |
| 20 | (Poland) Mateusz Bieniek | 5 April 1994 | 2.10 m (6 ft 11 in) | middle blocker |
| 37 | (Poland) Dawid Ogórek | 30 July 1990 | 1.84 m (6 ft 0 in) | libero |
| 55 | (United States) Kyle Ensing | 6 March 1997 | 2.01 m (6 ft 7 in) | opposite |
| 99 | (Poland) Patryk Łaba | 30 July 1991 | 1.88 m (6 ft 2 in) | outside hitter |
| Head coach: | | (Poland) Michał Winiarski | | |

Asseco Resovia
| No. | Name | Date of birth | Height | Position |
|---|---|---|---|---|
| 1 | (Poland) Mateusz Poręba | 24 August 1999 | 2.04 m (6 ft 8 in) | middle blocker |
| 2 | (Poland) Dawid Woch | 16 May 1997 | 2.00 m (6 ft 7 in) | middle blocker |
| 3 | (Poland) Wiktor Nowak | 21 May 1999 | 1.86 m (6 ft 1 in) | setter |
| 4 | (France) Yacine Louati | 4 March 1992 | 1.98 m (6 ft 6 in) | outside hitter |
| 5 | (Poland) Jakub Bucki | 13 August 1988 | 1.97 m (6 ft 6 in) | opposite |
| 6 | (Canada) Danny Demyanenko | 13 July 1994 | 1.96 m (6 ft 5 in) | middle blocker |
| 7 | (Australia) Beau Graham | 17 April 1994 | 2.05 m (6 ft 9 in) | middle blocker |
| 11 | (Czech Republic) Lukáš Vašina | 6 July 1999 | 1.96 m (6 ft 5 in) | outside hitter |
| 12 | (Poland) Artur Szalpuk | 20 March 1995 | 2.02 m (6 ft 8 in) | outside hitter |
| 13 | (Poland) Michał Potera | 6 March 1988 | 1.83 m (6 ft 0 in) | libero |
| 16 | (Poland) Paweł Zatorski | 21 June 1990 | 1.84 m (6 ft 0 in) | libero |
| 18 | (Slovenia) Klemen Čebulj | 21 February 1992 | 2.02 m (6 ft 8 in) | outside hitter |
| 19 | (Poland) Marcin Janusz | 31 July 1994 | 1.95 m (6 ft 5 in) | setter |
| 21 | (Poland) Karol Butryn | 18 June 1993 | 1.93 m (6 ft 4 in) | opposite |
| 22 | (United States) Erik Shoji | 24 August 1989 | 1.83 m (6 ft 0 in) | libero |
| 25 | (Poland) Cezary Sapiński | 28 September 1994 | 2.03 m (6 ft 8 in) | middle blocker |
| Head coach: | | (Italy) Massimo Botti | | |

Barkom-Kazhany Lviv
| No. | Name | Date of birth | Height | Position |
|---|---|---|---|---|
| 1 | (France) Moussé Gueye | 11 November 1996 | 1.98 m (6 ft 6 in) | middle blocker |
| 2 | (Ukraine) Illia Kovalov | 31 August 1996 | 1.98 m (6 ft 6 in) | outside hitter |
| 3 | (Australia) Lorenzo Pope | 6 December 2001 | 2.05 m (6 ft 9 in) | outside hitter |
| 4 | (Ukraine) Oleh Shevchenko | 8 January 1993 | 1.94 m (6 ft 4 in) | outside hitter |
| 6 | (Ukraine) Mykola Kuts | 17 May 2006 | 2.08 m (6 ft 10 in) | middle blocker |
| 8 | (Poland) Oskar Woźny | 26 April 2005 | 1.80 m (5 ft 11 in) | libero |
| 11 | (Germany) Lukas Kampa | 29 November 1986 | 1.93 m (6 ft 4 in) | setter |
| 12 | (Ukraine) Vladyslav Shchurov | 27 April 2001 | 2.07 m (6 ft 9 in) | middle blocker |
| 13 | (Ukraine) Vasyl Tupchii | 13 January 1992 | 1.96 m (6 ft 5 in) | opposite |
| 14 | (Ukraine) Dmytro Vietskyy | 19 February 1998 | 2.02 m (6 ft 8 in) | opposite |
| 16 | (Japan) Yamato Nakano | 2 October 1999 | 1.79 m (5 ft 10 in) | setter |
| 19 | (Ukraine) Andrii Rohozhyn | 13 July 1997 | 2.03 m (6 ft 8 in) | middle blocker |
| 21 | (Ukraine) Yaroslav Pampushko | 11 January 2001 | 1.78 m (5 ft 10 in) | libero |
| 22 | (Slovakia) Julius Firkal | 14 January 1998 | 1.97 m (6 ft 6 in) | outside hitter |
| Head coach: | | (Latvia) Uģis Krastiņš | | |

Bogdanka LUK Lublin
| No. | Name | Date of birth | Height | Position |
|---|---|---|---|---|
| 1 | (Canada) Daenan Gyimah | 15 January 1998 | 2.03 m (6 ft 8 in) | middle blocker |
| 2 | (France) Hilir Henno | 12 September 2003 | 2.03 m (6 ft 8 in) | outside hitter |
| 4 | (Poland) Marcin Komenda | 24 May 1996 | 1.98 m (6 ft 6 in) | setter |
| 5 | (Poland) Mikołaj Sawicki | 23 November 1999 | 1.98 m (6 ft 6 in) | outside hitter |
| 6 | (Poland) Mateusz Malinowski | 6 May 1992 | 1.98 m (6 ft 6 in) | opposite |
| 7 | (Poland) Jakub Wachnik | 16 February 1993 | 2.02 m (6 ft 8 in) | outside hitter |
| 9 | (Poland) Wilfredo León | 31 July 1993 | 2.02 m (6 ft 8 in) | outside hitter |
| 11 | (Bulgaria) Aleks Grozdanov | 28 March 1998 | 2.08 m (6 ft 10 in) | middle blocker |
| 15 | (Canada) Jackson Young | 29 July 2001 | 1.95 m (6 ft 5 in) | outside hitter |
| 16 | (Poland) Maciej Czyrek | 17 December 2000 | 1.83 m (6 ft 0 in) | libero |
| 17 | (Brazil) Thales Hoss | 26 April 1989 | 1.90 m (6 ft 3 in) | libero |
| 20 | (Poland) Maciej Zając | 5 March 2003 | 1.98 m (6 ft 6 in) | middle blocker |
| 24 | (Poland) Rafał Prokopczuk | 23 March 1999 | 1.87 m (6 ft 2 in) | setter |
| 33 | (Canada) Fynn McCarthy | 4 December 1999 | 2.03 m (6 ft 8 in) | middle blocker |
| 35 | (Poland) Kewin Sasak | 20 February 1997 | 2.08 m (6 ft 10 in) | opposite |
| Head coach: | | (France) Stéphane Antiga | | |

Cuprum Stilon Gorzów
| No. | Name | Date of birth | Height | Position |
|---|---|---|---|---|
| 1 | (Poland) Marcin Waliński | 24 October 1990 | 1.96 m (6 ft 5 in) | outside hitter |
| 4 | (France) Mathis Henno | 25 February 2005 | 1.95 m (6 ft 5 in) | outside hitter |
| 5 | (Poland) Patryk Niemiec | 18 February 1997 | 2.02 m (6 ft 8 in) | middle blocker |
| 7 | (Poland) Szymon Gregorowicz | 7 March 1994 | 1.83 m (6 ft 0 in) | libero |
| 8 | (Brazil) Thiago Veloso | 15 August 1993 | 1.85 m (6 ft 1 in) | setter |
| 11 | (Poland) Marcin Kania | 14 February 1996 | 2.03 m (6 ft 8 in) | middle blocker |
| 12 | (Poland) Krzysztof Rejno | 22 February 1993 | 2.03 m (6 ft 8 in) | middle blocker |
| 13 | (Poland) Mateusz Maciejewicz | 12 March 2002 | 1.82 m (6 ft 0 in) | setter |
| 16 | (Brazil) Chizoba Neves | 25 July 1997 | 2.00 m (6 ft 7 in) | opposite |
| 21 | (Poland) Kamil Kwasowski | 13 September 1990 | 1.97 m (6 ft 6 in) | outside hitter |
| 23 | (Poland) Wojciech Więcławski | 17 April 2005 | 1.94 m (6 ft 4 in) | outside hitter |
| 72 | (Poland) Hubert Węgrzyn | 6 January 2000 | 2.00 m (6 ft 7 in) | middle blocker |
| 92 | (Poland) Kamil Dembiec | 7 February 1992 | 1.78 m (5 ft 10 in) | libero |
| 99 | (Poland) Daniel Gąsior | 9 January 1995 | 2.00 m (6 ft 7 in) | opposite |
| Head coach: | | (France) Hubert Henno | | |

Energa Trefl Gdańsk
| No. | Name | Date of birth | Height | Position |
|---|---|---|---|---|
| 1 | (Poland) Piotr Nowakowski | 18 December 1987 | 2.05 m (6 ft 9 in) | middle blocker |
| 4 | (Poland) Przemysław Stępień | 7 February 1994 | 1.85 m (6 ft 1 in) | setter |
| 6 | (Poland) Mariusz Schamlewski | 16 January 1991 | 1.98 m (6 ft 6 in) | middle blocker |
| 7 | (Poland) Paweł Pietraszko | 5 October 1990 | 2.01 m (6 ft 7 in) | middle blocker |
| 8 | (Finland) Voitto Köykkä | 9 July 1999 | 1.79 m (5 ft 10 in) | libero |
| 9 | (Poland) Aliaksei Nasevich | 5 June 2003 | 1.97 m (6 ft 6 in) | opposite |
| 10 | (Germany) Tobias Brand | 9 July 1998 | 1.95 m (6 ft 5 in) | outside hitter |
| 11 | (Poland) Damian Kogut | 3 January 1997 | 1.91 m (6 ft 3 in) | outside hitter |
| 14 | (Poland) Rafał Sobański | 10 August 1991 | 1.95 m (6 ft 5 in) | outside hitter |
| 16 | (Poland) Fabian Majcherski | 28 March 1997 | 1.75 m (5 ft 9 in) | libero |
| 17 | (Poland) Piotr Orczyk | 19 March 1993 | 1.98 m (6 ft 6 in) | outside hitter |
| 18 | (Poland) Damian Schulz | 26 February 1990 | 2.08 m (6 ft 10 in) | opposite |
| 22 | (Poland) Moustapha M'Baye | 22 January 1992 | 1.98 m (6 ft 6 in) | middle blocker |
| 49 | (United States) Joe Worsley | 16 June 1997 | 1.85 m (6 ft 1 in) | setter |
| Head coach: | | (Poland) Mariusz Sordyl | | |

Indykpol AZS Olsztyn
| No. | Name | Date of birth | Height | Position |
|---|---|---|---|---|
| 2 | (Germany) Moritz Karlitzek | 12 August 1996 | 1.91 m (6 ft 3 in) | outside hitter |
| 4 | (Poland) Łukasz Kozub | 3 November 1997 | 1.86 m (6 ft 1 in) | setter |
| 5 | (Poland) Jakub Ciunajtis | 6 August 1998 | 1.77 m (5 ft 10 in) | libero |
| 6 | (Germany) Johannes Tille | 7 May 1997 | 1.85 m (6 ft 1 in) | setter |
| 7 | (Poland) Dawid Siwczyk | 13 June 1993 | 1.97 m (6 ft 6 in) | middle blocker |
| 10 | (Poland) Jakub Majchrzak | 13 May 2004 | 2.08 m (6 ft 10 in) | middle blocker |
| 11 | (Poland) Seweryn Lipiński | 1 January 2001 | 2.00 m (6 ft 7 in) | middle blocker |
| 13 | (Poland) Kacper Sienkiewicz | 11 April 2005 | 2.02 m (6 ft 8 in) | outside hitter |
| 14 | (Poland) Kuba Hawryluk | 8 September 2003 | 1.81 m (5 ft 11 in) | libero |
| 15 | (Poland) Paweł Halaba | 14 December 1995 | 1.94 m (6 ft 4 in) | outside hitter |
| 17 | (Poland) Mateusz Janikowski | 5 May 1999 | 2.01 m (6 ft 7 in) | outside hitter |
| 19 | (Poland) Paweł Cieślik | 18 March 2000 | 1.97 m (6 ft 6 in) | middle blocker |
| 21 | (Poland) Szymon Patecki | 4 April 2005 | 1.99 m (6 ft 6 in) | opposite |
| 22 | (Poland) Karol Borkowski | 14 February 1998 | 1.95 m (6 ft 5 in) | outside hitter |
| 31 | (Canada) Arthur Szwarc | 30 March 1995 | 2.07 m (6 ft 9 in) | opposite |
| 91 | (Czech Republic) Jan Hadrava | 3 June 1991 | 1.99 m (6 ft 6 in) | opposite |
| Head coach: | | (Poland) Daniel Pliński | | |

Inpost ChKS Chełm
| No. | Name | Date of birth | Height | Position |
|---|---|---|---|---|
| 1 | (Poland) Grzegorz Jacznik | 9 July 1998 | 1.95 m (6 ft 5 in) | setter |
| 2 | (Poland) Mariusz Marcyniak | 5 March 1992 | 2.06 m (6 ft 9 in) | middle blocker |
| 4 | (Poland) Michał Witkoś | 28 January 1998 | 1.85 m (6 ft 1 in) | setter |
| 6 | (Poland) Daniel Ostaszewski | 4 January 1993 | 1.84 m (6 ft 0 in) | libero |
| 7 | (Poland) Jakub Turski | 6 September 1998 | 2.02 m (6 ft 8 in) | middle blocker |
| 8 | (Poland) Paweł Rusin | 5 March 1992 | 1.82 m (6 ft 0 in) | outside hitter |
| 9 | (Canada) Jay Blankenau | 27 September 1989 | 1.94 m (6 ft 4 in) | setter |
| 10 | (Poland) Tomasz Piotrowski | 2 September 1997 | 1.98 m (6 ft 6 in) | outside hitter |
| 11 | (Poland) Remigiusz Kapica | 28 September 2000 | 2.00 m (6 ft 7 in) | opposite |
| 12 | (Iran) Amirhossein Esfandiar | 24 January 1999 | 2.10 m (6 ft 11 in) | outside hitter |
| 13 | (Poland) Łukasz Swodczyk | 6 January 1990 | 1.96 m (6 ft 5 in) | middle blocker |
| 14 | (Poland) Jędrzej Goss | 3 July 1996 | 1.93 m (6 ft 4 in) | opposite |
| 16 | (Poland) Jędrzej Gruszczyński | 13 November 1997 | 1.86 m (6 ft 1 in) | libero |
| 17 | (Norway) Rune Fasteland | 17 December 1995 | 2.05 m (6 ft 9 in) | middle blocker |
| 18 | (Japan) Kazuma Sonae | 6 January 1998 | 1.67 m (5 ft 6 in) | libero |
| 93 | (Poland) Łukasz Łapszyński | 23 September 1993 | 1.94 m (6 ft 4 in) | outside hitter |
| Head coach: | | (Poland) Krzysztof Andrzejewski | | |

Jastrzębski Węgiel
| No. | Name | Date of birth | Height | Position |
|---|---|---|---|---|
| 2 | (Poland) Łukasz Kaczmarek | 29 June 1994 | 2.04 m (6 ft 8 in) | opposite |
| 6 | (France) Benjamin Toniutti | 30 October 1989 | 1.83 m (6 ft 0 in) | setter |
| 7 | (Poland) Adam Lorenc | 30 October 1998 | 1.98 m (6 ft 6 in) | opposite |
| 8 | (Poland) Adrian Staszewski | 31 May 1990 | 1.98 m (6 ft 6 in) | outside hitter |
| 9 | (Poland) Nicolas Szerszeń | 31 December 1996 | 1.95 m (6 ft 5 in) | outside hitter |
| 11 | (Serbia) Miran Kujundžić | 19 June 1997 | 1.96 m (6 ft 5 in) | outside hitter |
| 12 | (Germany) Anton Brehme | 10 August 1999 | 2.06 m (6 ft 9 in) | middle blocker |
| 17 | (Poland) Jakub Jurczyk | 17 February 2006 | 1.83 m (6 ft 0 in) | libero |
| 18 | (Poland) Maksymilian Granieczny | 7 July 2005 | 1.77 m (5 ft 10 in) | libero |
| 19 | (Poland) Mateusz Kufka | 8 November 2003 | 1.97 m (6 ft 6 in) | middle blocker |
| 23 | (Poland) Jordan Zaleszczyk | 23 April 2002 | 2.03 m (6 ft 8 in) | middle blocker |
| 27 | (Poland) Michał Gierżot | 4 October 2001 | 2.06 m (6 ft 9 in) | outside hitter |
| 33 | (Poland) Łukasz Usowicz | 13 August 1997 | 2.03 m (6 ft 8 in) | middle blocker |
| 91 | (United States) Joshua Tuaniga | 18 March 1997 | 1.91 m (6 ft 3 in) | setter |
| Head coach: | | (Poland) Andrzej Kowal | | |

Norwid Częstochowa
| No. | Name | Date of birth | Height | Position |
|---|---|---|---|---|
| 1 | (Poland) Bartłomiej Lipiński | 16 November 1996 | 2.01 m (6 ft 7 in) | outside hitter |
| 5 | (Poland) Jakub Kiedos | 23 November 2006 | 2.04 m (6 ft 8 in) | outside hitter |
| 6 | (Poland) Daniel Popiela | 29 April 2001 | 2.02 m (6 ft 8 in) | middle blocker |
| 7 | (Poland) Damian Radziwon | 5 November 2002 | 2.01 m (6 ft 7 in) | middle blocker |
| 8 | (Poland) Artur Sługocki | 1 May 1999 | 1.96 m (6 ft 5 in) | outside hitter |
| 10 | (France) Samuel Jeanlys | 27 March 1999 | 2.02 m (6 ft 8 in) | opposite |
| 11 | (Iran) Milad Ebadipour | 17 October 1993 | 1.96 m (6 ft 5 in) | outside hitter |
| 13 | (Poland) Mateusz Masłowski | 13 June 1997 | 1.85 m (6 ft 1 in) | libero |
| 15 | (Argentina) Luciano De Cecco | 2 June 1988 | 1.93 m (6 ft 4 in) | setter |
| 16 | (Poland) Bartosz Makoś | 1 August 1998 | 1.76 m (5 ft 9 in) | libero |
| 17 | (Poland) Tomasz Kowalski | 12 June 1991 | 2.02 m (6 ft 8 in) | setter |
| 18 | (Poland) Bartłomiej Ostój | 7 January 2004 | 1.81 m (5 ft 11 in) | libero |
| 23 | (Czech Republic) Patrik Indra | 8 December 1997 | 2.00 m (6 ft 7 in) | opposite |
| 31 | (Poland) Sebastian Adamczyk | 28 February 1999 | 2.08 m (6 ft 10 in) | middle blocker |
| 73 | (Poland) Jakub Nowak | 11 June 2005 | 2.05 m (6 ft 9 in) | middle blocker |
| Head coach: | | (Spain) Guillermo Falasca → (Croatia) Ljubomir Travica | | |

PGE GiEK Skra Bełchatów
| No. | Name | Date of birth | Height | Position |
|---|---|---|---|---|
| 1 | (Morocco) Zouheir El Graoui | 1 July 1994 | 1.97 m (6 ft 6 in) | outside hitter |
| 3 | (Poland) Maksym Kędzierski | 13 March 2003 | 1.83 m (6 ft 0 in) | libero |
| 4 | (Brazil) Alan Souza | 21 March 1994 | 2.02 m (6 ft 8 in) | opposite |
| 5 | (Poland) Arkadiusz Żakieta | 13 October 1992 | 1.97 m (6 ft 6 in) | opposite |
| 7 | (Poland) Bartłomiej Lemański | 19 March 1996 | 2.16 m (7 ft 1 in) | middle blocker |
| 9 | (Poland) Łukasz Wiśniewski | 3 February 1989 | 1.98 m (6 ft 6 in) | middle blocker |
| 11 | (France) Antoine Pothron | 5 March 2002 | 1.98 m (6 ft 6 in) | outside hitter |
| 12 | (Poland) Grzegorz Łomacz | 1 October 1987 | 1.88 m (6 ft 2 in) | setter |
| 14 | (Iran) Mohammad Manavinejad | 27 November 1995 | 2.00 m (6 ft 7 in) | outside hitter |
| 15 | (Poland) Michał Szalacha | 15 January 1994 | 2.02 m (6 ft 8 in) | middle blocker |
| 16 | (Poland) Mateusz Nowak | 29 February 2004 | 2.14 m (7 ft 0 in) | middle blocker |
| 17 | (Poland) Bartosz Krzysiek | 19 February 1990 | 2.07 m (6 ft 9 in) | opposite |
| 20 | (Poland) Kamil Szymura | 24 January 1999 | 1.85 m (6 ft 1 in) | libero |
| 22 | (Poland) Kajetan Kubicki | 9 February 2003 | 1.90 m (6 ft 3 in) | setter |
| 29 | (Poland) Kamil Szymendera | 30 April 2003 | 1.92 m (6 ft 4 in) | outside hitter |
| 99 | (Romania) Daniel Chiţigoi | 10 March 2005 | 2.03 m (6 ft 8 in) | outside hitter |
| Head coach: | | (Poland) Krzysztof Stelmach | | |

PGE Projekt Warsaw
| No. | Name | Date of birth | Height | Position |
|---|---|---|---|---|
| 4 | (Poland) Jakub Kochanowski | 17 July 1997 | 1.99 m (6 ft 6 in) | middle blocker |
| 5 | (Poland) Jan Firlej | 26 September 1996 | 1.88 m (6 ft 2 in) | setter |
| 6 | (Poland) Karol Kłos | 8 August 1989 | 2.01 m (6 ft 7 in) | middle blocker |
| 7 | (France) Kévin Tillie | 2 November 1990 | 2.01 m (6 ft 7 in) | outside hitter |
| 9 | (Ukraine) Yurii Semeniuk | 12 May 1994 | 2.10 m (6 ft 11 in) | middle blocker |
| 10 | (Poland) Bartosz Bednorz | 25 July 1994 | 2.01 m (6 ft 7 in) | outside hitter |
| 11 | (Poland) Aleksander Śliwka | 24 May 1995 | 1.97 m (6 ft 6 in) | outside hitter |
| 14 | (Poland) Maciej Olenderek | 16 October 1992 | 1.78 m (5 ft 10 in) | libero |
| 15 | (Poland) Bartosz Gomułka | 30 May 2002 | 2.02 m (6 ft 8 in) | opposite |
| 17 | (Canada) Brandon Koppers | 9 September 1995 | 2.02 m (6 ft 8 in) | outside hitter |
| 18 | (Poland) Damian Wojtaszek | 7 September 1988 | 1.80 m (5 ft 11 in) | libero |
| 19 | (Poland) Bartosz Firszt | 19 March 1999 | 1.98 m (6 ft 6 in) | outside hitter |
| 20 | (Germany) Linus Weber | 1 November 1999 | 2.01 m (6 ft 7 in) | opposite |
| 85 | (Poland) Michał Kozłowski | 16 February 1985 | 1.91 m (6 ft 3 in) | setter |
| 99 | (Poland) Jakub Strulak | 12 May 2001 | 2.10 m (6 ft 11 in) | middle blocker |
| Head coach: | | (Finland) Tommi Tiilikainen → (Poland) Kamil Nalepka | | |

Ślepsk Malow Suwałki
| No. | Name | Date of birth | Height | Position |
|---|---|---|---|---|
| 1 | (Poland) Jan Nowakowski | 17 May 1994 | 2.02 m (6 ft 8 in) | middle blocker |
| 4 | (Argentina) Joaquín Gallego | 21 November 1996 | 2.04 m (6 ft 8 in) | middle blocker |
| 5 | (Poland) Karol Jankiewicz | 21 February 1996 | 1.85 m (6 ft 1 in) | setter |
| 8 | (Brazil) Henrique Honorato | 18 March 1997 | 1.90 m (6 ft 3 in) | outside hitter |
| 9 | (Poland) Bartosz Filipiak | 27 February 1994 | 1.97 m (6 ft 6 in) | opposite |
| 10 | (Poland) Kamil Droszyński | 28 January 1997 | 1.90 m (6 ft 3 in) | setter |
| 14 | (Poland) Bartosz Mariański | 26 May 1992 | 1.87 m (6 ft 2 in) | libero |
| 15 | (United States) David Smith | 15 May 1985 | 2.01 m (6 ft 7 in) | middle blocker |
| 17 | (France) Joachim Panou | 27 August 1997 | 1.97 m (6 ft 6 in) | outside hitter |
| 22 | (Poland) Jakub Kubacki | 20 September 2005 | 1.71 m (5 ft 7 in) | libero |
| 47 | (Poland) Antoni Kwasigroch | 27 January 2002 | 1.92 m (6 ft 4 in) | outside hitter |
| 88 | (Bulgaria) Asparuh Asparuhov | 28 July 2000 | 2.00 m (6 ft 7 in) | outside hitter |
| 95 | (Poland) Jakub Macyra | 22 July 1995 | 2.02 m (6 ft 8 in) | middle blocker |
| 99 | (Poland) Damian Wierzbicki | 25 October 1992 | 1.98 m (6 ft 6 in) | opposite |
| Head coach: | | (Poland) Dominik Kwapisiewicz | | |

ZAKSA Kędzierzyn-Koźle
| No. | Name | Date of birth | Height | Position |
|---|---|---|---|---|
| 5 | (United States) Quinn Isaacson | 19 February 1999 | 1.88 m (6 ft 2 in) | setter |
| 7 | (Belgium) Igor Grobelny | 8 June 1993 | 1.94 m (6 ft 4 in) | outside hitter |
| 8 | (Poland) Konrad Stajer | 30 May 1994 | 1.98 m (6 ft 6 in) | middle blocker |
| 10 | (Poland) Mateusz Rećko | 9 April 1998 | 1.97 m (6 ft 6 in) | opposite |
| 11 | (Italy) Kamil Rychlicki | 29 August 1988 | 2.05 m (6 ft 9 in) | opposite |
| 12 | (Poland) Bartosz Zych | 15 July 2006 | 2.06 m (6 ft 9 in) | outside hitter |
| 13 | (Poland) Rafał Szymura | 29 August 1995 | 1.97 m (6 ft 6 in) | outside hitter |
| 14 | (Poland) Wojciech Kraj | 2 April 2000 | 2.10 m (6 ft 11 in) | middle blocker |
| 18 | (Poland) Bartosz Fijałek | 30 August 2003 | 1.77 m (5 ft 10 in) | libero |
| 21 | (Poland) Karol Urbanowicz | 24 February 2001 | 2.00 m (6 ft 7 in) | middle blocker |
| 23 | (Poland) Jakub Szymański | 25 March 1998 | 2.00 m (6 ft 7 in) | outside hitter |
| 24 | (Poland) Mateusz Czunkiewicz | 16 December 1996 | 1.83 m (6 ft 0 in) | libero |
| 34 | (Poland) Szymon Jakubiszak | 13 February 1998 | 2.08 m (6 ft 10 in) | middle blocker |
| 77 | (Poland) Marcin Krawiecki | 21 July 1998 | 1.88 m (6 ft 2 in) | setter |
| Head coach: | | (Italy) Andrea Giani | | |

== See also ==
- 2025 FIVB Volleyball Men's Club World Championship
- 2025–26 CEV Champions League
- 2025–26 CEV Cup
- 2025–26 CEV Challenge Cup
- 2025–26 Polish Men's Volleyball Cup
- Polish Men's Volleyball SuperCup
