= Norwegian Volleyball Premier League 2007–08 (women) =

Norwegian volleyball league season

The 2007–08 season of the Norwegian Premier League (Norwegian: Eliteserien), the highest volleyball league for women in Norway.

== League table ==
| Pos | Team | P | W | L | SetF | SetA | Pts |
|---|---|---|---|---|---|---|---|
| 1 | Koll | 24 | 23 | 1 | 69 | 6 | 69 |
| 2 | Oslo Volley | 24 | 22 | 2 | 66 | 15 | 64 |
| 3 | BSI | 24 | 17 | 7 | 55 | 30 | 50 |
| 4 | KFUM Stavanger | 24 | 14 | 10 | 47 | 43 | 38 |
| 5 | Tromsø Volley | 24 | 11 | 13 | 39 | 45 | 34 |
| 6 | NTNUI | 24 | 10 | 14 | 42 | 53 | 28 |
| 7 | Blindheim | 24 | 5 | 19 | 25 | 61 | 18 |
| 8 | Topp Volley | 24 | 4 | 20 | 22 | 64 | 15 |
| 9 | OSI | 24 | 2 | 22 | 20 | 68 | 8 |

| Preceded by 2006–07 | Norwegian Volleyball Premier League; 2007–08 | Succeeded by 2008–09 |
