= Norwegian Volleyball Premier League 2008–09 (women) =

Volleyball league season

The 2008–09 season of the Norwegian Premier League (Norwegian: Eliteserien), the highest volleyball league for women in Norway.

== League table ==
Pos	Team	P	W	L	SetF	SetA	Pts
1	Koll	21	20	1	61	9	58
2	Oslo Volley	21	16	5	53	22	48
3	BSI	21	16	5	55	28	48
4	KFUM Stavanger	21	13	8	43	32	39
5	Tromsø Volley	21	7	14	31	45	23
6	NTNUI	21	7	14	31	43	22
7	Topp Volley	21	4	17	16	57	10
8	Blindheim	21	1	20	7	61	4

Preceded by 2007–08	Norwegian Volleyball Premier League; 2008–09	Succeeded by 2009–10
