= Norwegian Volleyball Premier League 2009–10 (women) =

Norwegian volleyball league season

The 2009–10 season of the Norwegian Premier League (Norwegian: Eliteserien), the highest volleyball league for women in Norway.

== League table ==
Pos	Team	P	W	L	SetF	SetA	Pts
1	UiS	24	22	2	69	14	66
2	Koll	24	21	3	65	14	61
3	BSI	24	14	10	51	36	45
4	Oslo Volley	24	12	12	43	40	36
5	Stod	24	11	13	38	46	31
6	NTNUI	24	4	20	14	62	12
7	Tromsø Volley	24	0	24	4	72	1

Preceded by 2008–09	Norwegian Volleyball Premier League; 2009–10	Succeeded by 2010–11
