= 2026–27 CEV Champions League qualification =

Qualification for volleyball competition

The 2026–27 CEV Champions League qualification is played between 20 October and 26 November 2026. 11 teams registered for these qualification rounds of the 2026–27 CEV Champions League. The two remaining teams will join the other 18 teams automatically qualified for the League round. All 9 eliminated teams will compete in the 2026–27 CEV Cup.

== Participating teams ==
The drawing of lots was held on 15 July 2026 in Luxembourg City.

Rank	Country	Team(s)
10	Slovenia	ACH Volley Ljubljana
11	Bulgaria	Levski Sofia
12	Austria	TSV Raiffeisen Hartberg
14	Portugal	Sporting CP
17	Netherlands	Orion Stars Doetinchem
18	Croatia	Mladost Zagreb
23	Bosnia and Herzegovina	Napredak Odžak
24	North Macedonia	OK Sztip
25	Hungary	Fino Kaposvár
27	Cyprus	Kuutio Homes Pafiakos Pafos
32	Azerbaijan	Khilasedichi Baku

== Bracket ==
The drawing of lots was held on 15 July 2026 in Luxembourg City.

First round
(Netherlands) Orion Stars Doetinchem	3	3
(North Macedonia) OK Sztip	0	2
(Hungary) Fino Kaposvár	3	3
(Bosnia and Herzegovina) Napredak Odžak	2	1
(Cyprus) Kuutio Homes Pafiakos Pafos	1	1
(Croatia) Mladost Zagreb	3	3

Second round
(Slovenia) ACH Volley Ljubljana	3	3
(Netherlands) Orion Stars Doetinchem	0	2
(Azerbaijan) Khilasedichi Baku	2	3	15
(Portugal) Sporting CP	3	2	13
(Austria) TSV Raiffeisen Hartberg	0	0
(Hungary) Fino Kaposvár	3	3
(Bulgaria) Levski Sofia	1	0
(Croatia) Mladost Zagreb	3	3

Third round
(Slovenia) ACH Volley Ljubljana	3
(Azerbaijan) Khilasedichi Baku	1
(Hungary) Fino Kaposvár	0
(Croatia) Mladost Zagreb	3

== First round ==
- The winners of the ties qualify for the second round.
- In case the teams are tied after two legs, a Golden Set is played immediately at the completion of the second leg.
- All times are local.

Team 1	Agg.	Team 2	1st leg	2nd leg
Fino Kaposvár (Hungary)	2–0	(Bosnia and Herzegovina) Napredak Odžak	3–2	3–1
Kuutio Homes Pafiakos Pafos (Cyprus)	0–2	(Croatia) Mladost Zagreb	1–3	1–3
	Bye	(Azerbaijan) Khilasedichi Baku		
Orion Stars Doetinchem (Netherlands)	2–0	(North Macedonia) OK Sztip	3–0	3–2

=== First leg ===
Date	Time		Score		Set 1	Set 2	Set 3	Set 4	Set 5	Total	Report
21 Oct	18:00	Fino Kaposvár (Hungary)	3–2	(Bosnia and Herzegovina) Napredak Odžak	25–17	28–30	23–25	25–12	15–13	116–97	Report
20 Oct	19:00	Kuutio Homes Pafiakos Pafos (Cyprus)	1–3	(Croatia) Mladost Zagreb	21–25	25–21	21–25	23–25		90–96	Report
21 Oct	20:00	Orion Stars Doetinchem (Netherlands)	3–0	(North Macedonia) OK Sztip	25–13	25–19	25–17			75–49	Report

=== Second leg ===
Date	Time		Score		Set 1	Set 2	Set 3	Set 4	Set 5	Total	Report
28 Oct	20:00	Napredak Odžak (Bosnia and Herzegovina)	1–3	(Hungary) Fino Kaposvár	17–25	20–25	25–21	17–25		79–96	Report
29 Oct	17:00	Mladost Zagreb (Croatia)	3–1	(Cyprus) Kuutio Homes Pafiakos Pafos	21–25	25–22	25–17	25–19		96–83	Report
28 Oct	18:00	OK Sztip (North Macedonia)	2–3	(Netherlands) Orion Stars Doetinchem	25–23	20–25	25–21	10–25	10–15	90–109	Report

== Second round ==
- The winners of the ties qualify for the third round.
- In case the teams are tied after two legs, a Golden Set is played immediately at the completion of the second leg.
- All times are local.

Team 1	Agg.	Team 2	1st leg	2nd leg	Golden Set
Fino Kaposvár (Hungary)	2–0	(Austria) TSV Raiffeisen Hartberg	3–0	3–0	
Mladost Zagreb (Croatia)	2–0	(Bulgaria) Levski Sofia	3–1	3–0	
Khilasedichi Baku (Azerbaijan)	1–1	(Portugal) Sporting CP	2–3	3–2	15–13
Orion Stars Doetinchem (Netherlands)	0–1	(Slovenia) ACH Volley Ljubljana	0–3	–	

=== First leg ===
Date	Time		Score		Set 1	Set 2	Set 3	Set 4	Set 5	Total	Report
5 Nov	18:00	Fino Kaposvár (Hungary)	3–0	(Austria) TSV Raiffeisen Hartberg	25–22	25–18	25–19			75–59	Report
4 Nov	19:00	Mladost Zagreb (Croatia)	3–1	(Bulgaria) Levski Sofia	25–15	25–19	17–25	25–23		92–82	Report
3 Nov	18:00	Khilasedichi Baku (Azerbaijan)	2–3	(Portugal) Sporting CP	23–25	25–19	25–23	23–25	10–15	106–107	Report
4 Nov	20:00	Orion Stars Doetinchem (Netherlands)	0–3	(Slovenia) ACH Volley Ljubljana	23–25	26–28	14–25			63–78	Report

=== Second leg ===
Date	Time		Score		Set 1	Set 2	Set 3	Set 4	Set 5	Total	Report
10 Nov	19:00	TSV Raiffeisen Hartberg (Austria)	0–3	(Hungary) Fino Kaposvár	17-25	26–28	18–25			61–53	Report
11 Nov	20:00	Levski Sofia (Bulgaria)	0–3	(Croatia) Mladost Zagreb	20–25	25–27	21–25			66–77	Report
11 Nov	19:30	Sporting CP (Portugal)	2–3	(Azerbaijan) Khilasedichi Baku	25–21	18–25	25–22	21–25	13–15	102–108	Report
Golden set		Sporting CP (Portugal)	13–15	(Azerbaijan) Khilasedichi Baku							
12 Nov	20:00	ACH Volley Ljubljana (Slovenia)	3–2	(Netherlands) Orion Stars Doetinchem	25–21	22–25	25–20	21–25	19–17	112–108	Report

== Third round ==
- The winners of the ties qualify for the third round.
- In case the teams are tied after two legs, a Golden Set is played immediately at the completion of the second leg.
- All times are local.

Team 1	Agg.	Team 2	1st leg	2nd leg
Fino Kaposvár (Hungary)	0–1	(Croatia) Mladost Zagreb	0–3	–
Khilasedichi Baku (Azerbaijan)	0–1	(Slovenia) ACH Volley Ljubljana	1–3	–

=== First leg ===
Date	Time		Score		Set 1	Set 2	Set 3	Set 4	Set 5	Total	Report
19 Nov	18:00	Fino Kaposvár (Hungary)	0–3	(Croatia) Mladost Zagreb	23–25	15–25	20–25			58–75	Report
19 Nov	18:00	Khilasedichi Baku (Azerbaijan)	1–3	(Slovenia) ACH Volley Ljubljana	20–25	18–25	26–24	20–25		84–99	Report

=== Second leg ===
Date	Time		Score		Set 1	Set 2	Set 3	Set 4	Set 5	Total	Report
24 Nov	20:00	Mladost Zagreb (Croatia)	–	(Hungary) Fino Kaposvár	–	–	–			0–0	Report
26 Nov	20:00	ACH Volley Ljubljana (Slovenia)	–	(Azerbaijan) Khilasedichi Baku	–	–	–			0–0	Report
