= Bartłomiej Lipiński =

Polish volleyball player (born 1996)

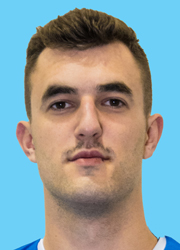

Personal information
- Nickname: Lipa
- Born: 16 November 1996 (age 29); Maków Mazowiecki, Poland
- Height: 2.01 m (6 ft 7 in)
- Weight: 105 kg (231 lb)
- Spike: 349 cm (137 in)

Volleyball information
- Position: Outside hitter
- Current club: Norwid Częstochowa
- Number: 1

Career
Years	Teams
2015–2016; 2016–2017; 2017–2018; 2018–2019; 2019; 2019–2020; 2020–2022; 2022–2023; 2023–2024; 2024–	AZS Częstochowa; BBTS Bielsko-Biała; Aurispa Alessano; Chemik Bydgoszcz; Al Ahli Doha; Cuprum Lubin; Trefl Gdańsk; AZS Olsztyn; Skra Bełchatów; Norwid Częstochowa

National team
2022–	Poland

Bartłomiej Lipiński (born 16 November 1996) is a Polish professional volleyball player who plays as an outside hitter for Norwid Częstochowa.

He was called up to the Poland national team for the 2022 Nations League.

== Honours ==
=== Universiade ===
- 2019 Summer Universiade
