= Luke Reynolds (volleyball) =

Australian volleyball coach (born 1985)

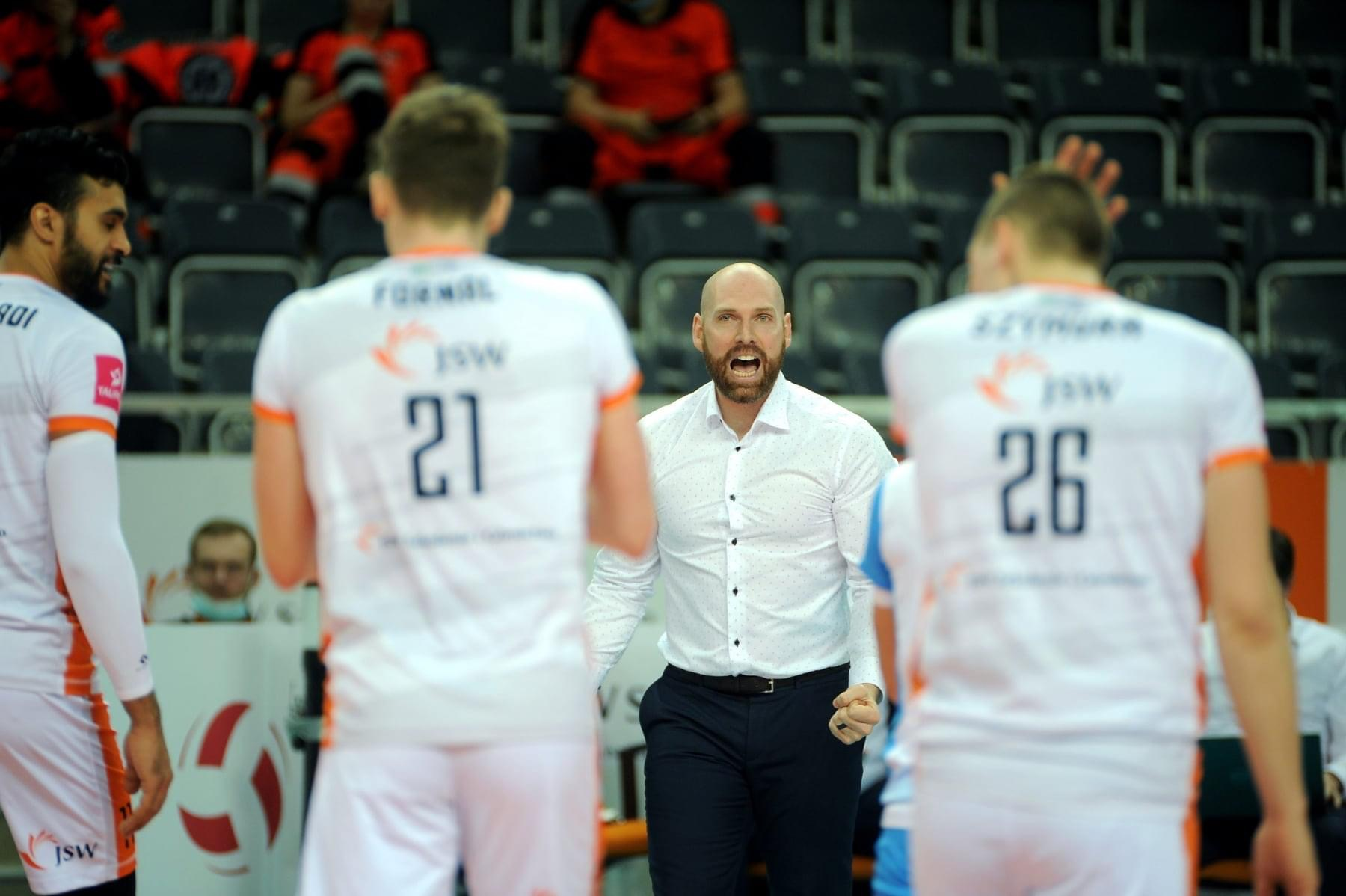
- Reynolds during the 2020–21 PlusLiga season

Personal information
- Born: 9 July 1985 (age 41); Melbourne, Australia
- Education: Brandon University

Coaching information
- Current team: Norwid Częstochowa
Previous teams coached
Years	Teams
2012–2013; 2013–2015; 2015–2016; 2016–2017; 2017–2020; 2017–2018; 2019–2020; 2020–2021; 2021–2022; 2021–2023; 2023; 2024; 2024–2026; 2026–	Brandon Bobcats (AC); Svedala Volley; Nea Salamis Famagusta; Jastrzębski Węgiel (AC); Australia (AC); Berlin Recycling Volleys; Jastrzębski Węgiel (AC); Jastrzębski Węgiel; Australia (AC); Charleston Golden Eagles; Cuba (AC); USA Collegiate National Team (AC); Pepperdine Waves (AC); Norwid Częstochowa

Luke Reynolds (born 9 July 1985) is an Australian professional volleyball coach. Since 2026, he has served as head coach for Norwid Częstochowa.

== Career ==
Reynolds started his coaching career in Canada after playing 4 seasons at the Brandon University. The coach then progressed to coaching professional in Europe at the young age of 27, taking over Svedala Volley in Sweden. Since then, Reynolds has worked his way through the European leagues, head coaching at most notably Berlin Recycling Volleys in the German Bundesliga and Jastrzębski Węgiel in the Polish PlusLiga.

Reynolds also worked extensively as an assistant coach with the Australian Men's National team. Not only has he worked as a volleyball coach but he has ascertained his Level 2 ASCA Strength and Conditioning certification and specialised in working with professional and international volleyball teams.

== Notable international and professional experiences ==
- 2023 NORCECA Championships – Cuba National Team, Charleston, USA (United States)
- 2021 21st AVC Asian Championships – AUS National Team, Tokyo, JPN (Japan)
- 2021 NCAA National Championships – Pepperdine University (United States)
- 2020–21 CEV Champions League with Jastrzebski Wegiel – withdrew COVID
- 2020 FIVB Tokyo Olympic Qualifications – AUS National Team – China
- 2019–20 CEV Champions League with Jastrzebski Wegiel – Qualified Semi Final vs Trentino – withdrew COVID
- 2019 FIVB International Olympic Qualifier – AUS National Team, Bari (Italy)
- 2019 20th AVC Asian Championships, Tehran, IRN – Silver medal (Iran)
- 2019 FIVB VNL (Volleyball Nations League) – Australian National Team
- 2019 FIVB World Cup, Tokyo, JPN (Japan)
- 2018 FIVB VNL (Volleyball Nations League) – Australian National Team
- 2018 FIVB World Championships – AUS National Team (Italy)
- 2017–18 CEV Champions League with Berlin Recycling Volleys
- 2017 FIVB World League Final – Bronze medal – (Australia)
- 2016–17 Jastrzebski Wegiel – Bronze medal – Poland PlusLiga
- 2015–16 Cyprus League Cup – Silver medal –
- 2014 Swedish Elite Series (Women) – Silver medal (Sweden)
- Swedish Elite Series Cup (Women) – Silver medal (Sweden)
- 2014 Swedish Gran Prix – Champions (Sweden)

== Assistant coach to the following ==
- 2013 – Grant Wilson
- 2016 to 2020 – Mark Lebedew
- 2019 – Roberto Santilli
- 2020 – Slobodan Kovač
- 2021 – Marcos Miranda
- 2023 – Jesus Cruz

== Coaching awards ==
- 2023: EIVA Coach Of the Year
