= 2025–26 CEV Challenge Cup =

Volleyball club tournament

CEV Challenge Cup
- 2025–26

Tournament information
- Sport: Volleyball
- Dates: 11 November 2025–1 April 2026
- Website: Challenge Cup

Final positions
- Champions: (Italy) Allianz Milano
- Runner-up: (Belgium) Lindemans Aalst
- MVP: (Belgium) Ferre Reggers

The 2025–26 CEV Challenge Cup was the 46th edition of the third tier European volleyball club competition organised by the European Volleyball Confederation.

== Format ==
Qualification round (Home and away matches):

- 32nd finals

Main phase (Home and away matches):

- 16th finals → 8th finals → Quarter-finals

Final phase (Home and away matches):

- Semi-finals → Finals

Aggregate score is counted as follows: 3 points for 3–0 or 3–1 win, 2 points for 3–2 win, 1 point for 2–3 loss.
In case the teams are tied after two legs, a Golden Set is played immediately at the completion of the second leg.

== 32nd finals ==
Team 1	Agg.	Team 2	1st leg	2nd leg	Golden Set
Beroe Stara Zagora (Bulgaria)	2–4	(Slovakia) Slovan Bratislava	3–2	0–3	
Lausanne UC (Switzerland)	6–0	(Norway) TIF Viking	3–0	3–0	
Volleyball Teurel (Spain)	2–4	(Israel) Maccabi Tel Aviv	1–3	3–2	
Chênois Genève (Switzerland)	0–6	(Bulgaria) Neftohimik Burgas	0–3	1–3	
Foinikas Syros (Greece)	5–1	(Denmark) Nordenskov UIF	3–0	3–2	
Bigbank Tartu (Estonia)	5–1	(Estonia) Pärnu VK	3–1	2–3	
OK Maribor (Slovenia)	6–0	(Montenegro) Budućnost Podgorica	3–0	3–0	
Steaua Bucuresti (Romania)	3–3	(Azerbaijan) Khilasedichi	3–0	1–3	13–15
Anorthosis Famagusta (Cyprus)	0–6	(Ukraine) Epicentr-Podolyany	0–3	0–3	
Karadjordje Topola (Serbia)	5–1	(Slovenia) MOK Krka	3–2	3–0	
Pafiakos (Cyprus)	6–0	(Kosovo) KV Ferizaj	3–0	3–0	
Vegyész RC Kazincbarcika (Hungary)	0–6	(Hungary) Fino Kaspovar	0–3	0–3	
CV Manacor (Spain)	1–5	(Croatia) HAOK Mladost	2–3	1–3	
Mladost Ribola Castela (Croatia)	1–5	(Serbia) Crvena Zvezda	2–3	0–3	
IL Koll (Norway)	3–3	(North Macedonia) UGD Stip	3–1	0–3	8–15
Volejbal Brno (Czech Republic)	6–0	(Cyprus) Omonia V.C.	3–1	3–0	
OK Budvanska Rivijera (Montenegro)	5–1	(Netherlands) VC Stroosen	3–2	3–1	
Arcada Galați (Romania)	6–0	(Finland) Vammalan Lentopallo	3–0	3–1	
OKM Centrometal (Croatia)	0–6	(Portugal) Benfica	0–3	0–3	
Sliedrecht Sport (Netherlands)	6–0	(Faroe Islands) Mjølnir Klasvik	3–0	3–0	

=== Matches ===
All times are local.

Date	Time		Score		Set 1	Set 2	Set 3	Set 4	Set 5	Total	Report
First leg
11 Nov	18:00	Beroe Stara Zagora (Bulgaria)	3–2	(Slovakia) Slovan Bratislava	18–25	25–27	25–17	25–14	15–11	108–94	P2 Report
11 Nov	18:00	Volejbal Brno (Czech Republic)	3–1	(Cyprus) Omonia Nicosia	25–12	21–25	25–14	25–15		96–66	P2 Report
11 Nov	18:00	OK Budvanska Rivijera (Montenegro)	3–2	(Luxembourg) VC Stroosen	27–25	24–26	25–20	18–25	15–11	109–107	P2 Report
11 Nov	20:00	Volleyball Teurel (Spain)	1–3	(Israel) Maccabi Tel Aviv	19–25	18–25	28–26	22–25		87–101	P2 Report
11 Nov	20:00	Anorthosis Famagusta (Cyprus)	0–3	(Ukraine) Epicentr-Podolyany	19–25	15–25	18–25			52–75	P2 Report
12 Nov	18:00	Karadjordje Topola (Serbia)	3–2	(Slovenia) MOK Krka	21–25	25–22	25–19	19–25	15–4	105–95	P2 Report
12 Nov	18:00	OK Maribor (Slovenia)	3–0	(Montenegro) Budućnost Podgorica	25–21	25–20	25–18			75–59	P2 Report
12 Nov	18:00	Arcada Galați (Romania)	3–0	(Finland) Vammalan Lentopallo	25–16	25–22	25–15			75–53	P2 Report
12 Nov	18:00	OKM Centrometal (Croatia)	0–3	(Portugal) Benfica	18–25	19–25	14–25			51–75	P2 Report
12 Nov	19:00	Foinikas Syros (Greece)	3–0	(Denmark) Nordenskov UIF	25–21	25–17	25–20			75–58	P2 Report
12 Nov	19:00	Bigbank Tartu (Estonia)	3–1	(Estonia) Pärnu VK	17–25	28–26	25–16	25–15		95–82	P2 Report
12 Nov	19:00	Steaua Bucuresti (Romania)	3–0	(Azerbaijan) Khilasedichi	25–21	25–20	25–20			75–61	P2 Report
12 Nov	19:00	CV Manacor (Spain)	2–3	(Croatia) HAOK Mladost	21–25	22–25	29–27	25–21	12–15	109–113	P2 Report
12 Nov	19:00	Mladost Ribola Castela (Croatia)	2–3	(Serbia) Crvena Zvezda	32–30	25–23	16–25	21–25	13–15	107–118	P2 Report
12 Nov	19:00	IL Koll (Norway)	3–1	(North Macedonia) UGD Stip	35–33	22–25	25–18	25–23		107–99	P2 Report
12 Nov	19:30	Lausanne UC (Switzerland)	3–0	(Norway) TIF Viking	29–27	25–20	25–23			79–70	P2 Report
12 Nov	20:00	Chênois Genève (Switzerland)	0–3	(Bulgaria) Neftohimik Burgas	24–26	21–25	20–25			65–76	P2 Report
12 Nov	20:00	Sliedrecht Sport (Netherlands)	3–0	(Faroe Islands) Mjølnir Klasvik	25–16	25–18	25–22			75–56	P2 Report
13 Nov	18:00	Vegyész RC Kazincbarcika (Hungary)	0–3	(Hungary) Fino Kaspovar	18–25	14–25	17–25			49–75	P2 Report
17 Nov	20:00	Pafiakos (Cyprus)	3–0	(Kosovo) KV Ferizaj	25–16	25–15	25–16			75–47	P2 Report
Second leg
12 Nov	20:00	Maccabi Tel Aviv (Israel)	2–3	(Spain) Volleyball Teurel	25–23	25–27	22–25	29–27	10–15	111–117	P2 Report
12 Nov	20:00	Epicentr-Podolyany (Ukraine)	3–0	(Cyprus) Anorthosis Famagusta	25–18	25–12	25–17			75–47	P2 Report
13 Nov	18:00	OK Maribor (Montenegro)	0–3	(Slovenia) Budućnost Podgorica	17–25	20–25	21–25			58–75	P2 Report
18 Nov	20:00	Pafiakos (Kosovo)	0–3	(Cyprus) KV Ferizaj	16–25	16–25	22–25			54–75	P2 Report
18 Nov	20:00	Omonia Nicosia (Cyprus)	0–3	(Czech Republic) Volejbal Brno	23–25	18–25	23–25			64–75	P2 Report
19 Nov	18:00	Pärnu VK (Estonia)	3–2	(Estonia) Bigbank Tartu	25–18	25–22	22–25	22–25	15–9	109–99	P2 Report
19 Nov	18:00	Fino Kaspovar (Hungary)	3–0	(Hungary) Vegyész RC Kazincbarcika	25–18	25–23	25–18			75–59	P2 Report
19 Nov	18:30	Vammalan Lentopallo (Finland)	1–3	(Romania) Arcada Galați	16–25	23–25	25–16	21–25		85–91	P2 Report
19 Nov	19:00	TIF Viking (Norway)	0–3	(Switzerland) Lausanne UC	23–25	18–25	21–25			62–75	P2 Report
19 Nov	19:00	Neftohimik Burgas (Bulgaria)	3–1	(Switzerland) Chênois Genève	23–25	25–11	25–20	25–22		98–78	P2 Report
19 Nov	19:00	UGD Stip (North Macedonia)	3–0	(Norway) IL Koll	25–18	25–23	25–16			75–57	P2 Report
Golden set		UGD Stip (North Macedonia)	15–8	(Norway) IL Koll							
19 Nov	19:00	Mjølnir Klasvik (Faroe Islands)	0–3	(Netherlands) Sliedrecht Sport	21–25	23–25	21–25			65–75	P2 Report
19 Nov	19:30	Slovan Bratislava (Slovakia)	3–0	(Bulgaria) Beroe Stara Zagora	28–26	25–21	25–19			78–66	P2 Report
19 Nov	19:30	VC Stroosen (Luxembourg)	1–3	(Montenegro) OK Budvanska Rivijera	25–23	18–25	23–25	18–25		84–98	P2 Report
19 Nov	20:00	Nordenskov UIF (Denmark)	2–3	(Greece) Foinikas Syros	25–14	22–25	25–22	18–25	15–17	105–103	P2 Report
19 Nov	20:00	MOK Krka (Slovenia)	0–3	(Serbia) Karadjordje Topola	17–25	26–28	22–25			65–78	P2 Report
19 Nov	20:00	HAOK Mladost (Croatia)	3–1	(Spain) CV Manacor	25–16	25–20	16–25	25–19		91–80	P2 Report
19 Nov	20:00	Benfica (Portugal)	3–0	(Croatia) OKM Centrometal	25–13	25–12	25–15			75–40	P2 Report
20 Nov	18:00	Khilasedichi (Azerbaijan)	3–1	(Romania) Steaua Bucuresti	25–23	25–17	15–25	28–26		93–91	P2 Report
Golden set		Khilasedichi (Azerbaijan)	15–13	(Romania) Steaua Bucuresti							
20 Nov	19:00	Crvena Zvezda (Serbia)	3–0	(Croatia) Mladost Ribola Castela	25–18	25–20	26–24			76–62	P2 Report

== 16th finals ==
Team 1	Agg.	Team 2	1st leg	2nd leg	Golden Set
Khilasedichi (Azerbaijan)	0–6	(Belgium) Lindemans Aalst	0–3	1–3	
Fino Kaspovar (Hungary)	2–4	(Spain) Conqueridor Valencia	3–2	0–3	
OK Budvanska Rivijera (Montenegro)	0–6	(Romania) SCM Zalău	0–3	0–3	
Pafiakos (Cyprus)	0–6	(Greece) PAOK	1–3	0–3	
Foinikas (Greece)	2–4	(France) Chaumont VB 52	3–2	0–3	
Epicentr-Podolyany (Ukraine)	6–0	(Serbia) Karađorđe Topola	3–1	3–0	
Slovan Bratislava (Slovakia)	3–3	(Netherlands) Prima Donna Kaas	3–0	1–3	15–10
Bigbank Tartu (Estonia)	3–3	(Germany) WWK Volleys	3–1	0–3	15–12
OK Maribor (Slovenia)	0–6	(Poland) Norwid Częstochowa	1–3	1–3	
UGD Stip (North Macedonia)	0–6	(Italy) Allianz Milano	0–3	0–3	
Lausanne UC (Switzerland)	0–6	(Czech Republic) Dukla Liberec	0–3	1–3	
Sliedrecht Sport (Netherlands)	0–6	(Turkey) Altekma SK	1–3	0–3	
Volejbal Brno (Czech Republic)	0–6	(Switzerland) Volley Näfels	0–3	0–3	
Arcada Galați (Romania)	3–3	(Portugal) Benfica	3–1	1–3	13–15
HAOK Mladost (Croatia)	1–5	(Serbia) OK Crvena Zvezda	2–3	0–3	
Neftochimic (Bulgaria)	0–3 (Note: The series was decided by one game only.)	(Israel) Maccabi Tel Aviv	1–3		

=== Matches ===
All times are local.

Date	Time		Score		Set 1	Set 2	Set 3	Set 4	Set 5	Total	Report
First leg
9 Dec	18:00	Khilasedichi (Azerbaijan)	0–3	(Belgium) Lindemans Aalst	17–25	22–25	23–25			62–75	P2 Report
9 Dec	18:00	Fino Kaspovar (Hungary)	3–2	(Spain) Conqueridor Valencia	25–23	19–25	25–17	18–25	15–10	102–100	P2 Report
9 Dec	18:00	OK Budvanska Rivijera (Montenegro)	0–3	(Romania) SCM Zalău	19–25	15–25	21–25			55–75	P2 Report
9 Dec	19:30	Pafiakos (Cyprus)	1–3	(Greece) PAOK	25–21	23–25	21–25	17–25		86–96	P2 Report
9 Dec	20:00	Foinikas (Greece)	3–2	(France) Chaumont VB 52	25–23	21–25	25–20	21–25	16–14	108–107	P2 Report
10 Dec	18:00	Epicentr-Podolyany (Ukraine)	3–1	(Serbia) Karađorđe Topola	25–22	25–21	23–25	25–20		98–88	P2 Report
10 Dec	19:00	Slovan Bratislava (Slovakia)	3–0	(Netherlands) Prima Donna Kaas	25–20	25–23	25–18			75–61	P2 Report
10 Dec	19:00	Bigbank Tartu (Estonia)	3–1	(Germany) WWK Volleys	24–26	25–17	25–14	26–24		100–81	P2 Report
10 Dec	19:00	OK Maribor (Slovenia)	1–3	(Poland) Norwid Częstochowa	21–25	26–24	13–25	15–25		75–99	P2 Report
10 Dec	19:00	UGD Stip (North Macedonia)	0–3	(Italy) Allianz Milano	12–25	14–25	20–25			46–75	P2 Report
10 Dec	19:30	Lausanne UC (Switzerland)	0–3	(Czech Republic) Dukla Liberec	21–25	17–25	16–25			54–75	P2 Report
10 Dec	20:00	Sliedrecht Sport (Netherlands)	1–3	(Turkey) Altekma SK	22–25	25–23	19–25	20–25		86–98	P2 Report
11 Dec	18:00	Volejbal Brno (Czech Republic)	2–3	(Switzerland) Volley Näfels	21–25	23–25	18–25			62–75	P2 Report
11 Dec	18:00	Arcada Galați (Romania)	3–1	(Portugal) Benfica	23–25	25–23	25–21	25–20		98–89	P2 Report
11 Dec	20:00	HAOK Mladost (Croatia)	2–3	(Serbia) OK Crvena Zvezda	25–15	19–25	21–25	25–19	11–15	101–99	P2 Report
7 Jan	20:00	Neftochimic (Bulgaria)	1–3	(Israel) Maccabi Tel Aviv	22–25	22–25	25–21	23–25		92–96	P2 Report
Second leg
10 Dec	18:00	SCM Zalău (Romania)	3–0	(Montenegro) OK Budvanska Rivijera	25–16	25–18	25–21			75–55	P2 Report
11 Dec	18:00	Karađorđe Topola (Serbia)	0–3	(Ukraine) Epicentr-Podolyany	16–25	14–25	23–25			53–75	P2 Report
6 Jan	17:00	OK Crvena Zvezda (Serbia)	3–0	(Croatia) HAOK Mladost	25–22	25–18	25–23			75–63	P2 Report
6 Jan	17:30	Allianz Milano (Italy)	3–0	(North Macedonia) UGD Stip	25–18	25–19	25–17			75–54	P2 Report
6 Jan	18:00	Conqueridor Valencia (Spain)	3–0	(Hungary) Fino Kaspovar	25–21	25–21	25–21			75–63	P2 Report
6 Jan	20:30	Norwid Częstochowa (Poland)	3–1	(Slovenia) OK Maribor	24–26	25–16	25–17	25–17		99–76	P2 Report
6 Jan	19:00	Benfica (Portugal)	3–1	(Romania) Arcada Galați	25–22	19–25	26–24	25–20		95–91	P2 Report
6 Jan	20:00	Chaumont VB 52 (France)	3–0	(Greece) Foinikas	25–22	25–20	25–19			75–61	P2 Report
7 Jan	19:00	Altekma SK (Turkey)	3–0	(Netherlands) Sliedrecht Sport	25–15	25–21	25–21			75–57	P2 Report
7 Jan	19:30	Volley Näfels (Switzerland)	3–0	(Czech Republic) Volejbal Brno	25–18	25–19	25–22			75–59	P2 Report
7 Jan	20:00	Prima Donna Kaas (Netherlands)	3–1	(Slovakia) Slovan Bratislava	16–25	25–15	25–23	25–18		91–81	P2 Report
7 Jan	20:30	Lindemans Aalst (Belgium)	3–1	(Azerbaijan) Khilasedichi	21–25	25–15	25–19	25–22		96–81	P2 Report
8 Jan	18:00	Dukla Liberec (Czech Republic)	3–1	(Switzerland) Lausanne UC	21–25	25–23	25–22	25–13		96–83	P2 Report
8 Jan	18:30	PAOK (Greece)	3–0	(Cyprus) Pafiakos	25–22	25–17	25–23			75–62	P2 Report
8 Jan	20:00	WWK Volleys (Germany)	3–0	(Estonia) Bigbank Tartu	25–17	25–22	30–28			80–67	P2 Report

== 8th finals ==
Team 1	Agg.	Team 2	1st leg	2nd leg	Golden Set
OK Crvena Zvezda (Serbia)	0–6	(Italy) Allianz Milano	0–3	0–3	
Bigbank Tartu (Estonia)	2–4	(Belgium) Lindemans Aalst	1–3	3–2	
Conqueridor Valencia (Spain)	0–6	(Poland) Norwid Częstochowa	0–3	0–3	
Benfica (Portugal)	3–3	(Turkey) Altekma SK	3–2	2–3	13–15
Slovan Bratislava (Slovakia)	5–1	(Czech Republic) Dukla Liberec	3–2	3–1	
Volley Näfels (Switzerland)	3–3	(Romania) SCM Zalău	3–0	0–3	11–15
Epicentr-Podolyany (Ukraine)	2–4	(Greece) PAOK	0–3	3–2	
Maccabi Tel Aviv (Israel)	3–3	(France) Chaumont VB 52	1–3	3–0	19–17

=== Matches ===
All times are local.

Date	Time		Score		Set 1	Set 2	Set 3	Set 4	Set 5	Total	Report
First leg
20 Jan	18:00	OK Crvena Zvezda (Serbia)	0–3	(Italy) Allianz Milano	16–25	23–25	18–25			57–75	P2 Report
21 Jan	19:00	Bigbank Tartu (Estonia)	1–3	(Belgium) Lindemans Aalst	25–18	23–25	22–25	22–25		92–93	P2 Report
21 Jan	19:00	Conqueridor Valencia (Spain)	0–3	(Poland) Norwid Częstochowa	20–25	22–25	20–25			62–75	P2 Report
21 Jan	19:00	Benfica (Portugal)	3–2	(Turkey) Altekma SK	23–25	26–28	26–24	25–19	15–12	115–108	P2 Report
21 Jan	19:30	Slovan Bratislava (Slovakia)	3–2	(Czech Republic) Dukla Liberec	25–17	17–25	21–25	25–21	15–11	103–99	P2 Report
21 Jan	19:30	Volley Näfels (Switzerland)	3–0	(Romania) SCM Zalău	25–22	25–21	25–17			75–60	P2 Report
22 Jan	18:00	Epicentr-Podolyany (Ukraine)	0–3	(Greece) PAOK	18–25	21–25	22–25			61–75	P2 Report
27 Jan	20:00	Maccabi Tel Aviv (Israel)	1–3	(France) Chaumont VB 52	15–25	25–21	20–25	20–25		80–96	P2 Report
Second leg
27 Jan	20:30	Allianz Milano (Italy)	3–0	(Serbia) OK Crvena Zvezda	25–16	25–14	25–18			75–48	P2 Report
28 Jan	17:00	Altekma SK (Turkey)	3–2	(Portugal) Benfica	19–25	25–19	25–20	22–25	15–11	106–100	P2 Report
Golden set		Altekma SK (Turkey)	15–13	(Portugal) Benfica							
28 Jan	18:00	Dukla Liberec (Czech Republic)	1–3	(Slovakia) Slovan Bratislava	25–21	20–25	22–25	24–26		91–97	P2 Report
28 Jan	18:00	SCM Zalău (Romania)	3–0	(Switzerland) Volley Näfels	25–21	25–19	25–22			75–62	P2 Report
Golden set		SCM Zalău (Romania)	15–11	(Switzerland) Volley Näfels							
28 Jan	20:00	Chaumont VB 52 (France)	0–3	(Israel) Maccabi Tel Aviv	22–25	22–25	18–25			62–75	P2 Report
Golden set		Chaumont VB 52 (France)	17–19	(Israel) Maccabi Tel Aviv							
28 Jan	20:30	Lindemans Aalst (Belgium)	2–3	(Estonia) Bigbank Tartu	25–27	25–15	25–22	25–27	9–15	109–106	P2 Report
29 Jan	18:00	PAOK (Greece)	2–3	(Ukraine) Epicentr-Podolyany	21–25	25–21	25–21	23–25	7–15	101–107	P2 Report
29 Jan	20:30	Norwid Częstochowa (Poland)	3–0	(Spain) Conqueridor Valencia	25–18	30–28	27–25			82–71	P2 Report

== Quarter-finals ==
Team 1	Agg.	Team 2	1st leg	2nd leg	Golden Set
Lindemans Aalst (Belgium)	4–2	(Greece) PAOK	3–2	3–2	
Norwid Częstochowa (Poland)	2–4	(Italy) Allianz Milano	0–3	3–2	
SCM Zalău (Romania)	3–3	(Turkey) Altekma SK	2–3	3–2	12–15
Slovan Bratislava (Slovakia)	4–2	(Israel) Maccabi Tel Aviv	2–3	3–1	

=== Matches ===
All times are local.

Date	Time		Score		Set 1	Set 2	Set 3	Set 4	Set 5	Total	Report
First leg
10 Feb	20:30	Lindemans Aalst (Belgium)	3–2	(Greece) PAOK	25–20	20–25	25–27	25–20	15–8	110–100	P2 Report
10 Feb	20:30	Norwid Częstochowa (Poland)	0–3	(Italy) Allianz Milano	23–25	20–25	21–25			64–75	[ P2] Report
11 Feb	18:00	SCM Zalău (Romania)	2–3	(Turkey) Altekma SK	25–19	11–25	25–18	22–25	12–15	95–102	P2 Report
17 Feb	19:00	Slovan Bratislava (Slovakia)	2–3	(Israel) Maccabi Tel Aviv	25–21	19–25	25–22	24–26	12–15	105–109	[ P2] Report
Second leg
17 Feb	19:00	PAOK (Greece)	2–3	(Belgium) Lindemans Aalst	20–25	21–25	25–18	25–23	12–15	103–106	P2 Report
18 Feb	19:00	Maccabi Tel Aviv (Israel)	1–3	(Slovakia) Slovan Bratislava	25–21	18–25	21–25	21–25		85–96	[ P2] Report
18 Feb	19:00	Altekma SK (Turkey)	2–3	(Romania) SCM Zalău	25–27	25–21	25–19	23–25	15–17	113–109	P2 Report
Golden set		Altekma SK (Turkey)	15–12	(Romania) SCM Zalău							
18 Feb	20:30	Allianz Milano (Italy)	2–3	(Poland) Norwid Częstochowa	30–28	25–23	21–25	21–25	8–15	105–116	P2 Report

== Semi-finals ==
Team 1	Agg.	Team 2	1st leg	2nd leg	Golden Set
Slovan Bratislava (Slovakia)	2–4	(Belgium) Lindemans Aalst	2–3	2–3	
Allianz Milano (Italy)	6–0	(Turkey) Altekma SK	3–0	3–1	

=== Matches ===
All times are local.

Date	Time		Score		Set 1	Set 2	Set 3	Set 4	Set 5	Total	Report
First leg
4 Mar	19:00	Slovan Bratislava (Slovakia)	2–3	(Belgium) Lindemans Aalst	11–25	44–42	29–31	25–14	13–15	122–127	Report
4 Mar	20:30	Allianz Milano (Italy)	3–0	(Turkey) Altekma SK	25–21	32–30	25–18			82–69	Report
Second leg
11 Mar	20:30	Lindemans Aalst (Belgium)	3–2	(Slovakia) Slovan Bratislava	25–20	25–19	22–25	15–25	15–13	102–102	Report
12 Mar	20:00	Altekma SK (Turkey)	1–3	(Italy) Allianz Milano	21–25	23–25	25–16	26–28		95–94	Report

== Final ==
Team 1	Agg.	Team 2	1st leg	2nd leg	Golden Set
Lindemans Aalst (Belgium)	0–6	(Italy) Allianz Milano	0–3	0–3	

=== Matches ===
All times are local.

Date	Time		Score		Set 1	Set 2	Set 3	Set 4	Set 5	Total	Report
First leg
25 Mar	20:30	Lindemans Aalst (Belgium)	0–3	(Italy) Allianz Milano	18–25	19–25	22–25			59–75	Report
Second leg
1 Apr	20:30	Allianz Milano (Italy)	3–0	(Belgium) Lindemans Aalst	25–16	25–19	25–18			75–53	Report

== Final standings ==
Rank	Team
1st place, gold medalist(s)	(Italy) Allianz Milano
2nd place, silver medalist(s)	(Belgium) Lindemans Aalst
Semifinalists	(Slovakia) Slovan Bratislava (Turkey) Altekma SK

2025–26 CEV Challenge Cup winners
(Italy)
Allianz Milano
2nd title

== See also ==
- 2025–26 CEV Champions League
- 2025–26 CEV Cup
- 2025–26 CEV Women's Champions League
- 2025–26 Women's CEV Cup
- 2025–26 CEV Women's Challenge Cup
