= 2026–27 CEV Champions League =

- League: CEV Champions League
- Sport: Volleyball
- Duration: Qualifying round: 20 October – 26 November 2026; Main tournament: 8 December 2026 – 16 May 2027
- Teams: 29 (11 qual. + 18 main tourn.)

CEV Champions League seasons
- ← 2025–26 2027–28 →

The 2026–27 CEV Champions League is the 68th edition of the highest level European volleyball club competition organised by the European Volleyball Confederation.

== Qualification ==
Of the 20 participating teams in the league round, 15 teams qualified directly, 3 teams were given wild cards and 2 teams will qualify from the third round.

| Rank | Country | Number of teams | | | Qualified teams |
| Rank | Country | Vac | Qual | Total | Qualified teams |
|---|---|---|---|---|---|
| 1 | Italy | 3+1 | – | 4 | Sir Sicoma Monini Perugia |
| 1 | Italy | 3+1 | – | 4 | Lube J.P. Mynè Civitanova |
| 1 | Italy | 3+1 | – | 4 | Rana Verona |
| 1 | Italy | 3+1 | – | 4 | Itas Trentino (Wild card) |
| 2 | Poland | 3 | – | 3 | Aluron CMC Warta Zawiercie |
| 2 | Poland | 3 | – | 3 | Bogdanka LUK Lublin |
| 2 | Poland | 3 | – | 3 | PGE Projekt Warsaw |
| 4 | Germany | 2 | – | 2 | Berlin Recycling Volleys |
| 4 | Germany | 2 | – | 2 | SVG Lüneburg |
| 5 | Turkey | 2 | – | 2 | Ziraat Bankkart Ankara |
| 5 | Turkey | 2 | – | 2 | Galatasaray HDI |
| 6 | France | 2 | – | 2 | Montpellier HSC VB |
| 6 | France | 2 | – | 2 | Tours VB |
| 7 | Belgium | 1 | – | 1 | Greenyard Maaseik |
| 8 | Czech Republic | 1 | – | 1 | VK ČEZ Karlovarsko |
| 9 | Greece | 1 | – | 1 | Panathinaikos Athens |
| 13 | Romania | 0+1 | – | 1 | Dinamo București (Wild card) |
| 15 | Spain | 0+1 | – | 1 | Guaguas Las Palmas (Wild card) |
| | (N/A) | – | – | 1 | Qualifier |
| | (N/A) | – | – | 1 | Qualifier |

== Pools composition ==
The drawing of lots was held on 15 July 2026 in Luxembourg City.

| Pool A | Pool B | Pool C |
|---|---|---|
| Berlin Recycling Volleys | Sir Sicoma Monini Perugia | Aluron CMC Warta Zawiercie |
| Galatasaray HDI | Ziraat Bankkart Ankara | SVG Lüneburg |
| Panathinaikos Athens | Montpellier HSC VB | VK ČEZ Karlovarsko |
| Qualifier | Dinamo București | Guaguas Las Palmas |

| Pool D | Pool E |
|---|---|
| Lube J.P. Mynè Civitanova | Bogdanka LUK Lublin |
| PGE Projekt Warsaw | Rana Verona |
| Greenyard Maaseik | Tours VB |
| Itas Trentino | Qualifier |

== League round ==
- The teams are split into 5 groups, each one featuring four teams.
- The top team in each pool automatically qualifies for the quarterfinals.
- All 2nd placed teams and the best 3rd placed team qualify for the playoffs.
- The remaining 3rd placed teams will compete in the quarterfinals of the 2026–27 CEV Cup.
- All times are local.

=== Pool standing procedure ===
1. Number of victories
2. Points
3. Set ratio
4. Setpoint ratio
5. H2H results

| Result | Winners | Losers |
|---|---|---|
| 3–0 | 3 points | 0 points |
| 3–1 | 3 points | 0 points |
| 3–2 | 2 points | 1 point |

=== Pool A ===
| Pos | Team | Pld | W | L | Pts | SW | SL | SR | SPW | SPL | SPR |
|---|---|---|---|---|---|---|---|---|---|---|---|
| 1 | (Germany) Berlin Recycling Volleys | 0 | 0 | 0 | 0 | 0 | 0 | — | 0 | 0 | — |
| 2 | (Turkey) Galatasaray HDI | 0 | 0 | 0 | 0 | 0 | 0 | — | 0 | 0 | — |
| 3 | (Greece) Panathinaikos Athens | 0 | 0 | 0 | 0 | 0 | 0 | — | 0 | 0 | — |
| 4 | (N/A) Qualifier | 0 | 0 | 0 | 0 | 0 | 0 | — | 0 | 0 | — |

First match(es) will be played: 8 December 2026. Source: CEV

=== Pool B ===
| Pos | Team | Pld | W | L | Pts | SW | SL | SR | SPW | SPL | SPR |
|---|---|---|---|---|---|---|---|---|---|---|---|
| 1 | (Italy) Sir Sicoma Monini Perugia | 0 | 0 | 0 | 0 | 0 | 0 | — | 0 | 0 | — |
| 2 | (Turkey) Ziraat Bankkart Ankara | 0 | 0 | 0 | 0 | 0 | 0 | — | 0 | 0 | — |
| 3 | (France) Montpellier HSC VB | 0 | 0 | 0 | 0 | 0 | 0 | — | 0 | 0 | — |
| 4 | (Romania) Dinamo București | 0 | 0 | 0 | 0 | 0 | 0 | — | 0 | 0 | — |

First match(es) will be played: 9 December 2026. Source: CEV

=== Pool C ===
| Pos | Team | Pld | W | L | Pts | SW | SL | SR | SPW | SPL | SPR |
|---|---|---|---|---|---|---|---|---|---|---|---|
| 1 | (Poland) Aluron CMC Warta Zawiercie | 0 | 0 | 0 | 0 | 0 | 0 | — | 0 | 0 | — |
| 2 | (Germany) SVG Lüneburg | 0 | 0 | 0 | 0 | 0 | 0 | — | 0 | 0 | — |
| 3 | (Czech Republic) VK ČEZ Karlovarsko | 0 | 0 | 0 | 0 | 0 | 0 | — | 0 | 0 | — |
| 4 | (Spain) Guaguas Las Palmas | 0 | 0 | 0 | 0 | 0 | 0 | — | 0 | 0 | — |

First match(es) will be played: 8 December 2026. Source: CEV

=== Pool D ===
| Pos | Team | Pld | W | L | Pts | SW | SL | SR | SPW | SPL | SPR |
|---|---|---|---|---|---|---|---|---|---|---|---|
| 1 | (Italy) Lube J.P. Mynè Civitanova | 0 | 0 | 0 | 0 | 0 | 0 | — | 0 | 0 | — |
| 2 | (Poland) PGE Projekt Warsaw | 0 | 0 | 0 | 0 | 0 | 0 | — | 0 | 0 | — |
| 3 | (Belgium) Greenyard Maaseik | 0 | 0 | 0 | 0 | 0 | 0 | — | 0 | 0 | — |
| 4 | (Italy) Itas Trentino | 0 | 0 | 0 | 0 | 0 | 0 | — | 0 | 0 | — |

First match(es) will be played: 8 December 2026. Source: CEV

=== Pool E ===
| Pos | Team | Pld | W | L | Pts | SW | SL | SR | SPW | SPL | SPR |
|---|---|---|---|---|---|---|---|---|---|---|---|
| 1 | (Poland) Bogdanka LUK Lublin | 0 | 0 | 0 | 0 | 0 | 0 | — | 0 | 0 | — |
| 2 | (Italy) Rana Verona | 0 | 0 | 0 | 0 | 0 | 0 | — | 0 | 0 | — |
| 3 | (France) Tours VB | 0 | 0 | 0 | 0 | 0 | 0 | — | 0 | 0 | — |
| 4 | (N/A) Qualifier | 0 | 0 | 0 | 0 | 0 | 0 | — | 0 | 0 | — |

First match(es) will be played: 9 December 2026. Source: CEV

=== First place ranking ===
| Pos | Team | Pld | W | L | Pts | SW | SL | SR | SPW | SPL | SPR | Qualification |
|---|---|---|---|---|---|---|---|---|---|---|---|---|
| 1 | | 0 | 0 | 0 | 0 | 0 | 0 | — | 0 | 0 | — | Quarterfinals |
| 2 | | 0 | 0 | 0 | 0 | 0 | 0 | — | 0 | 0 | — | Quarterfinals |
| 3 | | 0 | 0 | 0 | 0 | 0 | 0 | — | 0 | 0 | — | Quarterfinals |
| 4 | | 0 | 0 | 0 | 0 | 0 | 0 | — | 0 | 0 | — | Quarterfinals |
| 5 | | 0 | 0 | 0 | 0 | 0 | 0 | — | 0 | 0 | — | Quarterfinals |

First match(es) will be played: 8 December 2026. Source: CEV

=== Second place ranking ===
| Pos | Team | Pld | W | L | Pts | SW | SL | SR | SPW | SPL | SPR | Qualification |
|---|---|---|---|---|---|---|---|---|---|---|---|---|
| 1 | | 0 | 0 | 0 | 0 | 0 | 0 | — | 0 | 0 | — | Playoffs |
| 2 | | 0 | 0 | 0 | 0 | 0 | 0 | — | 0 | 0 | — | Playoffs |
| 3 | | 0 | 0 | 0 | 0 | 0 | 0 | — | 0 | 0 | — | Playoffs |
| 4 | | 0 | 0 | 0 | 0 | 0 | 0 | — | 0 | 0 | — | Playoffs |
| 5 | | 0 | 0 | 0 | 0 | 0 | 0 | — | 0 | 0 | — | Playoffs |

First match(es) will be played: 8 December 2026. Source: CEV

=== Third place ranking ===
| Pos | Team | Pld | W | L | Pts | SW | SL | SR | SPW | SPL | SPR | Qualification |
|---|---|---|---|---|---|---|---|---|---|---|---|---|
| 1 | | 0 | 0 | 0 | 0 | 0 | 0 | — | 0 | 0 | — | Playoffs |
| 2 | | 0 | 0 | 0 | 0 | 0 | 0 | — | 0 | 0 | — | 2026–27 CEV Cup |
| 3 | | 0 | 0 | 0 | 0 | 0 | 0 | — | 0 | 0 | — | 2026–27 CEV Cup |
| 4 | | 0 | 0 | 0 | 0 | 0 | 0 | — | 0 | 0 | — | 2026–27 CEV Cup |
| 5 | | 0 | 0 | 0 | 0 | 0 | 0 | — | 0 | 0 | — | 2026–27 CEV Cup |

First match(es) will be played: 8 December 2026. Source: CEV

== Bracket ==
Playoff 6
1st Ranked 3rd Placed Team
1st Ranked 2nd Placed Team
5th Ranked 2nd Placed Team
2nd Ranked 2nd Placed Team
4th Ranked 2nd Placed Team
3rd Ranked 2nd Placed Team

Quarterfinals
3rd Ranked Pool Winner
2nd Ranked Pool Winner
5th Ranked Pool Winner
4th Ranked Pool Winner
1st Ranked Pool Winner

Semifinals

Final
Third place

== Playoff 6 ==
- The winners of the ties qualify for the quarterfinals.
- In case the teams are tied after two legs, a Golden Set is played immediately at the completion of the second leg.
- All times are local.

| Team 1 | Agg. | Team 2 | 1st leg | 2nd leg |
|---|---|---|---|---|
| 1st Ranked 3rd Placed Team | – | 1st Ranked 2nd Placed Team | – | – |
| 5th Ranked 2nd Placed Team | – | 2nd Ranked 2nd Placed Team | – | – |
| 4th Ranked 2nd Placed Team | – | 3rd Ranked 2nd Placed Team | – | – |

=== First leg ===
| Date | Time | | Score | | Set 1 | Set 2 | Set 3 | Set 4 | Set 5 | Total | Report |
|---|---|---|---|---|---|---|---|---|---|---|---|
| 2–4 Mar | | 1st Ranked 3rd Placed Team | – | 1st Ranked 2nd Placed Team | – | – | – | | | 0–0 | Report |
| 2–4 Mar | | 5th Ranked 2nd Placed Team | – | 2nd Ranked 2nd Placed Team | – | – | – | | | 0–0 | Report |
| 2–4 Mar | | 4th Ranked 2nd Placed Team | – | 3rd Ranked 2nd Placed Team | – | – | – | | | 0–0 | Report |

=== Second leg ===
| Date | Time | | Score | | Set 1 | Set 2 | Set 3 | Set 4 | Set 5 | Total | Report |
|---|---|---|---|---|---|---|---|---|---|---|---|
| 9–11 Mar | | 1st Ranked 2nd Placed Team | – | 1st Ranked 3rd Placed Team | – | – | – | | | 0–0 | Report |
| 9–11 Mar | | 2nd Ranked 2nd Placed Team | – | 5th Ranked 2nd Placed Team | – | – | – | | | 0–0 | Report |
| 9–11 Mar | | 3rd Ranked 2nd Placed Team | – | 4th Ranked 2nd Placed Team | – | – | – | | | 0–0 | Report |

== Quarterfinals ==
- The winners of the ties qualify for the final four.
- In case the teams are tied after two legs, a Golden Set is played immediately at the completion of the second leg.
- All times are local.

| Team 1 | Agg. | Team 2 | 1st leg | 2nd leg |
|---|---|---|---|---|
| | – | 3rd Ranked Pool Winner | – | – |
| | – | 2nd Ranked Pool Winner | – | – |
| 5th Ranked Pool Winner | – | 4th Ranked Pool Winner | – | – |
| | – | 1st Ranked Pool Winner | – | – |

=== First leg ===
| Date | Time | | Score | | Set 1 | Set 2 | Set 3 | Set 4 | Set 5 | Total | Report |
|---|---|---|---|---|---|---|---|---|---|---|---|
| 23–25 Mar | | | – | 3rd Ranked Pool Winner | – | – | – | | | 0–0 | Report |
| 23–25 Mar | | | – | 2nd Ranked Pool Winner | – | – | – | | | 0–0 | Report |
| 23–25 Mar | | 5th Ranked Pool Winner | – | 4th Ranked Pool Winner | – | – | – | | | 0–0 | Report |
| 23–25 Mar | | | – | 1st Ranked Pool Winner | – | – | – | | | 0–0 | Report |

=== Second leg ===
| Date | Time | | Score | | Set 1 | Set 2 | Set 3 | Set 4 | Set 5 | Total | Report |
|---|---|---|---|---|---|---|---|---|---|---|---|
| 30 Mar–1 Apr | | 3rd Ranked Pool Winner | – | | – | – | – | | | 0–0 | Report |
| 30 Mar–1 Apr | | 2nd Ranked Pool Winner | – | | – | – | – | | | 0–0 | Report |
| 30 Mar–1 Apr | | 4th Ranked Pool Winner | – | 5th Ranked Pool Winner | – | – | – | | | 0–0 | Report |
| 30 Mar–1 Apr | | 1st Ranked Pool Winner | – | | – | – | – | | | 0–0 | Report |

== Final four ==
- Place:
- Time:

=== Semifinals ===
| Date | Time | Score | Set 1 | Set 2 | Set 3 | Set 4 | Set 5 | Total | Report |
|---|---|---|---|---|---|---|---|---|---|
| 15 May | | – | – | – | – | | | 0–0 | Report |
| 15 May | | – | – | – | – | | | 0–0 | Report |

=== 3rd place match ===
| Date | Time | Score | Set 1 | Set 2 | Set 3 | Set 4 | Set 5 | Total | Report |
|---|---|---|---|---|---|---|---|---|---|
| 16 May | | – | – | – | – | | | 0–0 | Report |

=== Final ===
| Date | Time | Score | Set 1 | Set 2 | Set 3 | Set 4 | Set 5 | Total | Report |
|---|---|---|---|---|---|---|---|---|---|
| 16 May | | – | – | – | – | | | 0–0 | Report |

== Final standings ==
| Rank | Team |
|---|---|
| 1st place, gold medalist(s) | |
| 2nd place, silver medalist(s) | |
| 3rd place, bronze medalist(s) | |
| 4 | |

2026–27 CEV Champions League winners

== See also ==
- 2026–27 CEV Women's Champions League
