= Blindheim IL =

Norwegian sports club

Home colours

Blindheim Idrettslag is a Norwegian sports club from Ålesund, Møre og Romsdal. It has sections for volleyball, association football and team handball.

It was founded in 1936, and the club colors are black and white. The home ground is Blindheim stadion, and the home arena is Blindheimshallen.

The women's volleyball team last played in the highest Norwegian league in the season 2008–09. Known players include Ingrid Tørlen.

Former footballers in the club include Jonatan Tollås and Marius Sætre. The men's football team currently plays in the Fourth Division, the fifth tier of Norwegian football. It last played in the Third Division in 2008.
