= KS Norwid Częstochowa =

Polish volleyball club

Neonet Norwid Częstochowa
- Full name: Neonet Norwid Częstochowa
- Short name: Norwid Częstochowa
- Founded: 2002; 24 years ago
- Ground: Hala Sportowa Częstochowa (Capacity: 6,800)
- Chairman: Łukasz Żygadło
- Manager: Luke Reynolds
- Captain: Željko Ćorić
- League: Tauron Liga
- 2025–26: 14th place
- Website: Club home page

Uniforms
Home	Away

KS Norwid Częstochowa, officially known for sponsorship reasons as Neonet Norwid Częstochowa, is a professional men's volleyball team from Częstochowa, which is also a section of the youth sports club, run at the 9th Cyprian K. Norwid High School in Częstochowa. In 2004–2012 the team performed under the name KS Delic-Pol Norwid Częstochowa. Since 2013, the team has been named Exact Systems Norwid Częstochowa. It is engaged in the training of young volleyball adepts. Players compete in youth, cadet, junior entertainment, as well as the Silesian Third League and the Polish First League (central level). Since the 2023/24 season, the team has been playing in the PlusLiga.

== Club history ==
In April 2002, the club was established in the Sports Association Seniors - Juniors Volleyball 2002 season. The club's goal is to popularize volleyball among children and young people, and prepare young players for professional practice of volleyball. The president of the club was Krzysztof Wachowiak. Since 2002, the Delic-Pol company became the sponsor of the club.

In September 2010, Delic-Pol Norwid Czestochowa's young volleyball players participated in the first U18 European Club Championships, which were played in the Italian region of Apulia, in the towns of Alberobello, Sammichele di Bari and Castellana Grotte. The Częstochowa players won the gold medal.

In the 2016/2017 season, the club played in the Tauron 1. Liga. In the first season of playing on the back of the PlusLiga, the team led by the Panas / Gościniak coaching duo took 10th place. The following season the team improved and the Częstochowa players were placed 7th. In the 2018/2019 season the team improved again, and the "blue-greens" season ended in sixth place. In the 2019/2020 season, Tomasz Wasilkowski became the new coach of the first team, who, due to unsatisfactory sports results, was replaced during the season by Piotr Lebioda.

The club plays their home matches at Hala Sportowa Częstochowa. In 2023, they were promoted to the higher level league and have been playing in the PlusLiga.

== Team ==
As of 2026–27 season

No.	Name	Date of birth	Position
1	(Poland) Oskar Hakert	29 April 2008 (age 18)	libero
5	(Poland) Jakub Kiedos	23 November 2006 (age 19)	outside hitter
6	(Poland) Daniel Popiela	29 April 2001 (age 25)	middle blocker
8	(Poland) Artur Sługocki	1 May 1999 (age 27)	outside hitter
9	(Poland) Mateusz Kufka	8 November 2003 (age 22)	middle blocker
10	(Poland) Bartosz Rembisz	1 January 1900 (age 126)	middle blocker
11	(Canada) Isaac Heslinga	22 January 2002 (age 24)	outside hitter
16	(Argentina) Pablo Kukartsev	25 March 1993 (age 33)	opposite
17	(Bosnia and Herzegovina) Željko Ćorić	24 August 1988 (age 38)	setter
19	(Poland) Tomasz Kowalski	12 June 1991 (age 35)	setter
21	(Denmark) Mads Jensen	24 April 1999 (age 27)	opposite
22	(Denmark) Oskar Madsen	17 January 2000 (age 26)	outside hitter
29	(Poland) Michał Grzyb	1 January 2005 (age 21)	outside hitter
73	(Poland) Jakub Nowak	11 June 2005 (age 21)	middle blocker
88	(Poland) Dominik Jaglarski	20 June 1997 (age 29)	libero
Head coach:		(Australia) Luke Reynolds	

== See also ==
- KS Norwid Częstochowa players
- KS Norwid Częstochowa coaches
