= IL Koll =

Norwegian football club

- Logo of IL Koll. The figure in the centre is the end of a ski pole.
- Full name: Idrettslaget Koll
- Founded: 3 November 1940
- Ground: Kollbanen, Oslo; Kringsjåhallen, Oslo

Idrettslaget Koll is a Norwegian multi-sports club from Kringsjå and Nordberg, Oslo. The club has sections for association football, volleyball, athletics, orienteering and Nordic skiing.

The club was founded on 3 November 1940 as IL Troll, but had to change its name because of a pre-existing club of the same name. The club started with skiing, orienteering and tennis, adding football, team handball and athletics in the years up to 1950.

The best known athlete in the club is Sander Aae Skotheim, who spent his younger years in Koll.

In 1986, the club added its volleyball section, which became its most famous. The club has won the Norwegian volleyball league and cup several times for both men and women. For men, the team participated in the 2025–26 CEV Challenge Cup.

Within football, IL Koll only operates children's teams and no adult teams.
