= Garmash =

Garmash (or Harmash in Ukrainian, Belarusian), (Cyrillic: Гармаш) is a Ruthenian (Ukrainian and Belarusian) last name derived from the word гармата (Ukr., Bel. harmáta, "gun, cannon"). It was originally the name given to Cossack gunners (artillerymen) as well as gunsmiths (cannon founders) at the Zaporozhian Sich.

A possible alternative origin is the Prussian word Garme (Gorme), “heat, warm”. Cf. Skr. ghṛṇa, Gk. thermos (θερμός), Av. garəma, O.Pers.garmapada, Pers. garme, Phryg. germe, Thrac. germas, Arm. jerm, O.Pruss. goro, Lith. garas, Ltv. gars, Russ. žar, O.Ir. fogeir, Welsh gori, Alb. zjarr, Kashmiri germi, garū'm.

== People with the surname ==
- Denys Harmash (born 1990), Ukrainian footballer
- Oleksandr Garmash (1890–1940), Ukrainian-Soviet scientist
- Pylyp Harmash (born 1989), Ukrainian volleyball player
- Sergei Garmash (born 1958), Ukrainian-Russian film and stage actor
- Tatiana Garmash-Roffe (born 1959), Russian author
