= Ukrop (disambiguation) =

Ukrop is an ethnic slur against Ukrainians.

Ukrop may also refer to:

- UKROP, a former Ukrainian political party
- Ukrop's Food Group, an American food manufacturer and former supermarket
- Robert Ukrop (born 1970), an American soccer player
