= Hennadii Korban =

Ukrainian businessman, politician, and Jewish community leader

- Геннадій Корбан
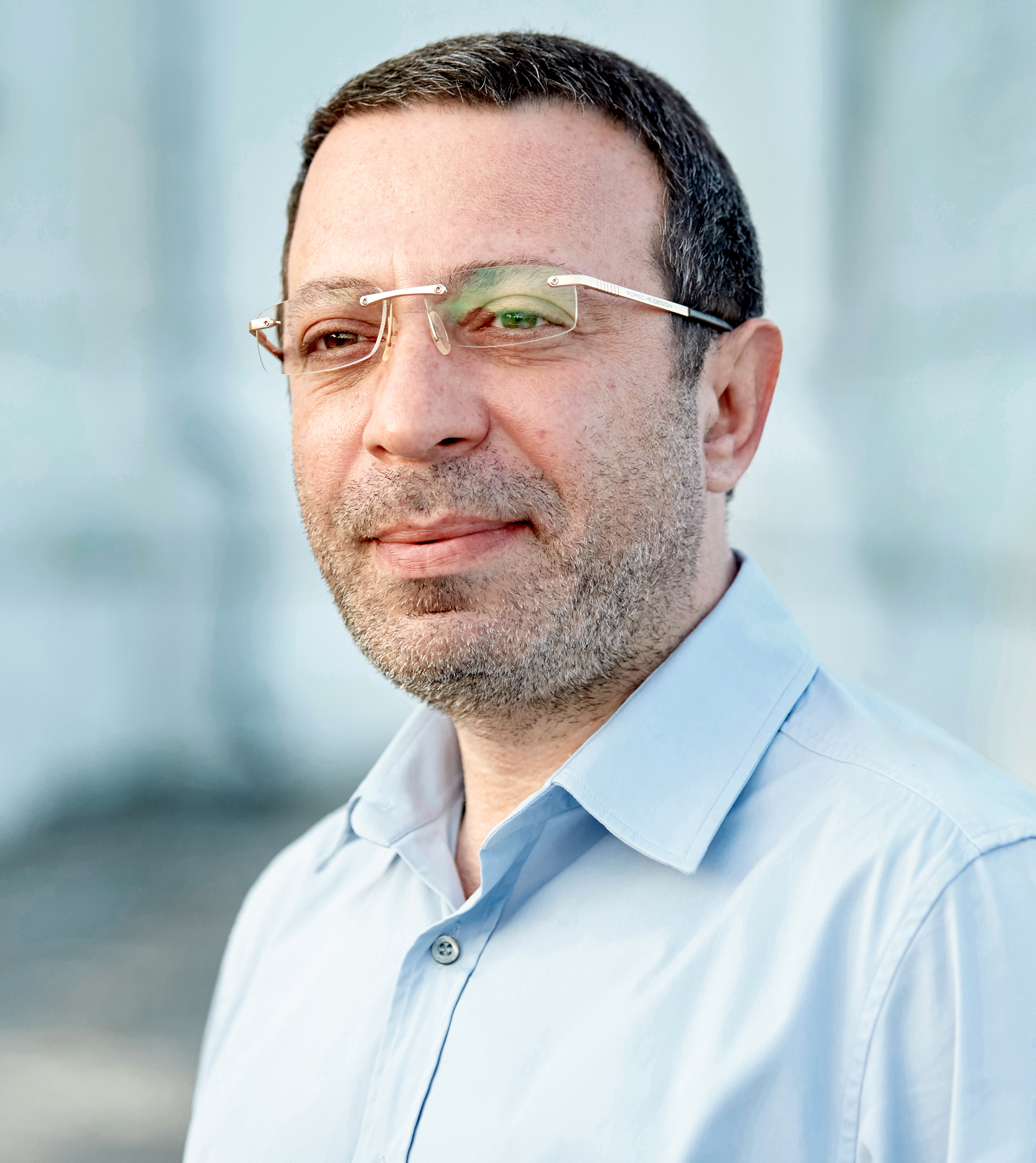
- Korban in 2015

Chief of Staff of the Dnipro Defense Council
- Incumbent
- Assumed office 28 February 2022
- President: Volodymyr Zelenskyy

Head of the Political Council of the Ukrainian Association of Patriots – UKROP
- In office 12 July 2015 – 23 January 2016

Deputy Governor of Dnipropetrovsk Oblast
- In office 2 March 2014 – 24 March 2015
- Governor: Ihor Kolomoyskyi

Personal details
- Born: Gennadii Olehovych Korban; May 24, 1970 (age 56) Dnipropetrovsk, Ukrainian SSR, Soviet Union
- Party: UKROP (2015–2016)
- Children: 4
- Education: National Mining University of Ukraine

Hennadii Olehovych Korban (Ukrainian: Геннадій Олегович Корбан; born May 24, 1970) is a Ukrainian former businessman and politician.

== Biography ==
=== Early life and education ===
Born to a Jewish family of Soviet engineers. His elder sister Victoria Korban (b. 1962) moved to Israel in 1990 with her family. Korban's parents also have Israeli citizenship.

He grew up in Dnipropetrovsk, where he graduated from secondary school No. 21 in 1987. After graduating from school, he entered the Faculty of Philosophy at Rostov State University, but was not enrolled because he could not provide a recommendation from the local party body of the Communist Party of Ukraine.

The same year he returned to Dnipropetrovsk and entered the Metallurgical Institute. Soon he suspended his studies and was drafted into the Soviet Army.

In 1988–1990 he served in the army, with the rank of ryadovoy in the Aviation Guards Regiment.

After demobilization in 1991, he entered the Maxim Gorky Literature Institute, but soon he skipped studying at the institute in favor of a job as a broker.

In 1997, he graduated from the State Mining Academy of Ukraine with a degree in finance and credit.

=== Business career ===
In 1991, he began working as a broker at the Center Soyuz Commodity Exchange and the Russian Commodity and Raw Materials Exchange.

In 1992, he returned to his native city with start-up capital and founded a brokerage office “Ukraine”.

In 1994, he started his investment company OJSC IC Slavutych Capital and headed its Board of Directors.

In 2001, he headed the Supervisory Board of Yuzhniy Mining and Processing Plant.

In 2005, he became a member of the Supervisory Board of the Ukrainian oil and gas company Ukrnafta, the largest producer of oil and gas in the country.

In business, Korban focused on primary privatization, securities trading, and the construction of large office and shopping centers in Kyiv and the Dnipro. He invested heavily in a number of blue chip stocks in Ukraine and abroad.

=== Political career ===
Head of the political council of the Ukrainian Association of Patriots - UKROP from July 12, 2015 to January 23, 2016.

Chief of Staff of the Dnipropetrovsk Regional State Administration from March 6, 2014 to March 24, 2015.

Since March 5, 2020 he is the head of the Community Board, a consultative body to the Dnipro City Council.

After the beginning of the full-scale Russian invasion of Ukraine, on February 28, 2022, he was appointed Chief of Staff of the Dnipro Defense Council.

== Involvement in the Revolution of Dignity ==
=== Korban supports Euromaidan in Dnipropetrovsk ===
During the Revolution of Dignity, he organizationally and financially supported the protests in Dnipropetrovsk, provided the protesters with legal and informational assistance. For this activity, together with his business partner Borys Filatov, he was persecuted by Deputy Prime Minister Oleksandr Vilkul, who influenced the regional authorities. On November 21, 2015, two years after the beginning of the Euromaidan, Korban recalled:

“...Filatov and I woke up the city of Dnipropetrovsk by broadcasting 5 Kanal (Petro Poroshenko's terrestrial television channel, which was the only one in Ukraine to broadcast live protests) on the advertising screens of our shopping malls as a symbol of truth and objectivity in the epicenter of the political influence of the Party of Regions”.

So Korban and Filatov mobilized pro-Ukrainian sentiments in Dnipropetrovsk. In addition to 5 Kanal, with the help of these advertising screens, residents of the city could watch live broadcasts from protests in Kyiv and other cities by Espreso TV satellite channel, which at that time did not have a license to broadcast in Ukraine. Also, businessmen hung the flags of Ukraine and the EU on the buildings of their hotels and business centers in Dnipropetrovsk.

According to Korban, the broadcast of 5 Kanal on the advertising screen of the “Passage” mall in the center of Dnipropetrovsk was organized during the events on Hrushevsky Street.

According to some evidence, the broadcast of 5 Kanal on the “Passage” advertising screen began on January 24.

It was on this day that the Dnipro city council met in an extraordinary session to vote for an appeal to Yanukovych to use all legal methods to resolve the situation (a veiled call to disperse the Euromaidan). This appeal was initiated by the Party of Regions.

In early February 2014, Korban explained his motivation to openly oppose the Yanukovych regime: “We decided that we had to do something as citizens, to send a signal that not all businessmen are afraid… We want to live in Europe, not in an outpost of the Russian empire.”

On Saturday, January 25, at about 5 p.m., the lights were turned off in the Passage, Europe and Library malls, escalators and elevators stopped; thousands of visitors were forced to leave the buildings in the dark.

In independent media, the incident was characterized as “sabotage” and “revenge”, organized by Deputy Prime Minister Oleksandr Vilkul. The municipal services of the city did not respond to messages about the blackout.

On January 26, the main advertising screen at the Passage shopping center broadcast the Swan Lake ballet (a reference to the coup attempt in the USSR in August 1991, when this ballet was broadcast on all TV channels), one of the side ones - the flags of Ukraine and the EU.

It was on this day in Dnipropetrovsk that about 3,000 participants in the Revolution of Dignity gathered at the Regional State Administration. They were brutally dispersed by the police and paramilitary “titushky” groups.

On the night of January 27, mass arrests took place, people were seized right on the street and beaten. At night, the judges sent the detainees en masse into custody. According to Borys Filatov, the “titushky” were brought to Dnipro from Kryvyi Rih. Among them were employees of security firms associated with local representatives of the Party of Regions, high-ranking police officers and the Security Service of Ukraine. The judoka Danylo Volovich, who commanded the titushkas, subsequently fled to Russia.

On January 27, when another Euromaidan rally took place on the European Square of Dnipropetrovsk, which was attended by about a hundred people, the Swan Lake ballet continued to be shown on the advertising screen of the Passage mall.

=== Appeal to the authorities of Ukraine ===
On January 27, on behalf of Dnipropetrovsk businessmen, Korban appealed to Viktor Yanukovych, the Cabinet of Ministers of Ukraine, deputies of the Verkhovna Rada and local authorities with a call to stop using force and make concessions for the sake of the country’s unity. He urged the authorities and the opposition to negotiate on the basis of the unity and indivisibility of Ukraine and the rights and freedoms of its citizens.

=== Political persecution by the Yanukovych regime ===
The persecution of Korban and Filatov began after the protesters were dispersed on January 26. According to Borys Filatov, “Berkut” squads searched the offices of Korban, Filatov and partners under the pretext of looking for extremists. They did not have documents authorizing the search. One of the well-known “Maidan judges” (judges who persecuted Euromaidan activists) Mykola Bibik, decided to forcibly bring Korban and Filatov to court, which in fact meant detention and arrest.

=== Emigration ===
On January 28, Korban and Filatov left Ukraine, after declaring that they were being persecuted for their citizen’s position by the authorities of the Dnipropetrovsk region, supervised by Deputy Prime Minister Oleksandr Vilkul. As Korban recalls, Ihor Kolomoyskyi provided them with his private jet for an urgent departure from Ukraine.

On January 30, 2014, Filatov announced that the court's decision to bring them to court was officially cancelled. However, the pressure on the supporters of the Maidan continued. Borys Filatov described the situation in Dnipro:

“Students and high school students are massively detained in the city. Arrests are issued for found Euromaidan flags. They wanted to cut down the front door of our employee's apartment, because they came to search for explosives.”

— Borys Filatov

On February 2, Korban and Filatov were invited to Knesset and met with the deputies there, and in the evening Knesset Speaker Yuli Edelstein had an informal conversation with them.

On February 4, on the advertising screen of the Passage mall, after the break, broadcasts of protests in Kyiv continued.

=== Proposals for resolving the conflict between government and society ===
On February 5, in Tel Aviv, Korban gave an interview in which he outlined his vision of the situation in Ukraine, the main risks and ways out.

“Slogans were heard about dividing the country into parts along the Dnipro river. We do not want to live in any one of the parts. We do not want Ukraine or part of it to turn into a black hole on the map of Europe, like Transnistria. …If the activity of civil society is crushed, then it is natural that it will be hard for business; it will be under the boot. And above all, under the boot of the Russian Federation, which will slowly and persistently impose its own rules on business in Ukraine.”

Korban sees the way to save Ukraine in asking the oligarchs for help in running the country:

“These people today have the largest intellectual resource in the country. Instead of robbing them or pushing them away, on the contrary, we should ask them for help in running the country”.

Korban named Ihor Kolomoyskyi, Gennadiy Bogolyubov, Rinat Akhmetov and Viktor Pinchuk as possible candidates.

After the victory of the Revolution of Dignity, the new authorities offered some of the leaders of the largest financial and industrial groups to become heads of regional state administrations in their respective regions. As a result, only Serhiy Taruta and Kolomoyskyi agreed.

According to his own statement, Kolomoyskyi himself proposed this HR initiative to the new authorities. In an interview with the WSJ on June 27, 2014, Kolomoyskyi recalled that he discussed the issue of his governorship with someone about a month before the fall of Viktor Yanukovych.

=== Appeal to big business ===
On February 19, after an attempt by the authorities to suppress the revolution by force, which led to mass casualties, Hennadiy Korban publicly addressed the leaders of all financial and industrial groups in Ukraine, urging them to take responsibility for saving the country:

“The war has begun. (...) Big business must take over the organization of the peace talks. I suggest that the leaders of the largest financial and industrial groups immediately, today, start organizing peace talks between the authorities and the opposition. Tomorrow it may be too late - because you won’t be able to get warlords to the negotiating table”.

== In public service ==
=== Historical context of public service appointment ===
On March 1, 2014, in the cities of the south and east of Ukraine, Russian saboteurs and pro-Russian fringe groups tried to seize administrative buildings, rip down Ukrainian flags and hang up Russian ones. In particular, in Dnipro, from 1,000 to 3,000 people gathered near the opera house, went to the Dnipro City Council and hung flags of Russia and Ukrainian SSR near it.

To stabilize the situation, on March 2, acting President Oleksandr Turchynov signed a decree appointing Kolomoyskyi as governor of the Dnipropetrovsk Oblast. In general, then the governors of 18 regions of Ukraine were replaced.

The National Defense Headquarters of the region was established in Dnipro. The deputies of the regional council and activists of various movements in the region adopted a joint document in which Yanukovych, separatism and Russian aggression were condemned, and the new leadership of Ukraine was recognized as legitimate. The document was signed by representatives of the regional branches of the Party of Regions, Batkivshchyna, the UDAR party, the Svoboda party, as well as activists of the Right Sector, Euromaidan and more than a dozen movements and parties.

On the same day, the new leadership of the Dnipropetrovsk Region sent assistance to the 174th anti-aircraft missile brigade of the city of Sevastopol. This is the first known case of organized volunteer assistance to the Ukrainian military during the Russo-Ukrainian War.

March 3, 2014 in Dnipropetrovsk Ihor Kolomoyskyi spoke to representatives of local self-government bodies and activists of the Revolution of Dignity.

The new regional authorities, together with local activists formed the Coordination Center of Public Order and Peace, which immediately declared a moratorium on rallies, and called leadership of the settlements of the region to protect strategic facilities and ensure timely social transfers.

Close cooperation with local civil society volunteers was typical for Kolomoyskyi and his deputies Korban and Filatov throughout their term. This cooperation became the basis for defending the Dnipropetrovsk region from Russian military aggression and transforming Dnipropetrovsk into Eastern Ukraine’s Outpost.

On March 6, 2014, Filatov announced that Korban had been appointed Deputy Governor - Chief of Staff.

=== The powers of Korban in the Dnipropetrovsk Regional State Administration ===
The day after his appointment, Korban presented his powers as an operational management and economic bloc.

In June 2014, Korban explained that he was “assigned” tactical work to lead the region, while Ihor Kolomoyskyi was assigned strategic work, and they are constantly in touch with each other to coordinate efforts. So, he carried out the operational management of the region during the absence of the governor, who spent most of his time abroad.

From the very beginning Korban was actively involved in the transformation of Dnipropetrovsk into an outpost of Ukraine, where volunteer battalions were formed, logistical, material, and medical support for the Antiterrorist Operation was organized, refugees were evacuated from the ATO zone, etc.

=== Economic policy in the region ===
In an interview on March 7, 2014, Korban proved himself a proponent of decentralization and the fight against corruption. He announced the intention of the new leadership of the Dnipropetrovsk Oblast to come up with an initiative to expand the powers of local self-government, financial decentralization, so that, among other things, the region could raise the salaries of state employees. With the region's current annual income of UAH 3.7 billion, according to Korban, there was “an internal reserve for doubling the budget revenues.”

On April 18, Korban called on the region’s major businessmen to raise workers' salaries in order to revive consumer demand and the region’s economy. Korban stated that the decision to increase employee benefits by 30 per cent had already been taken at ferroalloy enterprises controlled by Kolomoyskyi’s Privat Group.

As of March 2015, almost twice more taxes were collected in the Dnipropetrovsk Oblast than in the same period of 2014. The region’s economy grew 1.5 times over the year.

=== Counter-terrorism measures ===
As Korban recalled in February 2015, the first thing the new leadership did was to suppress the pro-Russian extremist underground cells and combat the spreading calls for pro-Russian armed separatism (de-facto irredentism, the so-called “Russian spring”) in the region. The counter-terrorism measures were personally controlled by Korban. As a result, although there had been clashes between pro- and anti-Maidan demonstrators in Dnipropetrovsk before the victory of the Revolution of Dignity, pro-Russian riots and extremist violence were avoided in the region in March.

=== Deployment of the defense of Dnipropetrovsk Oblast ===
One of the measures to prevent the spread of Russian aggression to the Dnipropetrovsk Oblast was the restriction of railway communication with the Donetsk Oblast. After Russia established effective control over Donetsk and created fictitious “authorities” of the “Donetsk People's Republic”, including the “Ministry of Transport”, the heads of some stations in the Dnipropetrovsk Oblast took part in a conference call of this “Ministry”. After that, by order of Korban, the paths of the Donets Railway at the entrance to the Dnipropetrovsk Oblast were blocked by KAMAZ vehicles, and the heads of the stations who participated in the conference call were fired. Later, rail traffic was restored on a limited scale with a full inspection of trains by authorized specialists at Chaplyne station. In addition, Korban organized the transfer of powerful wiretapping systems with the ability to wiretap to cell and analog communications to the regional department of the Security Service of Ukraine. This made it possible to effectively prevent infiltration of enemy sabotage and reconnaissance groups.

=== National Defense Headquarters and formation of volunteer battalions ===
Korban was at the forefront of the formation of Ukrainian volunteer battalions.

On March 19, 2014, the commandant of the National Defense Headquarters, Yuriy Bereza, announced the formation of the Dnipropetrovsk Defense Regiment. It was planned to recruit 1,700 people, and by 18 March had already recruited 400.

The New York Times report of April 6, 2014 states that the Dnipropetrovsk National Defense Staff, according to Yuriy Bereza, had by that time recruited more than 7,000 volunteers ready to fight against the Russian aggression.

Since April 12, 2014. Russian sabotage groups have started to capture settlements on Donbas. On April 13, acting Head of State Oleksandr Turchynov announced the beginning of large-scale counter-terrorist actions involving the Armed Forces to combat Russian saboteurs and collaborators, called the “Anti-Terrorist Operation” (ATO).

On the same day, Korban announced that on April 14, in coordination with Interior Minister Arsen Avakov, the formation of a special battalion “Dnipro” began. As Korban explained: "Our goal is to guarantee the rule of law and the safety of Ukrainian citizens who are threatened by the activities of unknown sabotage groups and illegal armed formations in the territory of the Dnipropetrovsk Oblast, as well as in the territories of the neighboring Kharkiv, Donetsk, Luhansk and Zaporizhzhia regions."

By April 15, when Avakov announced that each regional center in eastern and southern Ukraine would have its own volunteer battalion, including “Dnipro” in Dnipropetrovsk, the recruitment of volunteers for “Dnipro” unit had been going on for several days.

In the same days, the Right Sector deployed its base in the Dnipropetrovsk Oblast. On April 16, the head of this organization Dmytro Yarosh arrived in Dnipro.

On April 20, the Right Sector volunteers attacked the occupiers for the first time. In advance, Korban called Turchynov to ask for the first combat mission of the Right Sector. Turchynov determined that the purpose of the operation was to disable the transformer for the television tower on Mount Karachun near Sloviansk in order to limit enemy propaganda on television. The mission was not accomplished, because the volunteers stumbled upon an enemy checkpoint near Sloviansk. They managed to eliminate 6 enemy militants and after that retreated. Later, the Donbas, Luhansk, Shakhtyorsk/Tornado battalions were formed in the Dnipropetrovsk Oblast. According to Korban, they were seconded to the Dnipropetrovsk Department of Internal Affairs and were also provided with the assistance of the leadership of the Dnipropetrovsk RSA, including through the Country Defence Foundation, established on the initiative of Korban in May 2014. Korban also mentioned that they supported the Aidar and Azov battalions and units of the Armed Forces of Ukraine — the 25th Airborne Brigade, the 93rd Mechanized Brigade, and the 17th Tank Brigade.

According to Korban in June 2014, the leaders of the Dnipropetrovsk RSA paid additional allowances to the fighters of the volunteer battalions, provided them with uniforms, body armor, dry rations - everything except weapons.

On January 25, 2015, Korban said at a meeting with Canadian Ambassador to Ukraine Roman Waschuk: “The Dnipropetrovsk region has formed about 4 territorial defense battalions and about 6 police battalions exclusively from volunteers.”

=== Liberation of four districts of the Donetsk region and the city of Mariupol ===
At the beginning of May 2014, at the initiative of the leadership of the Dnipropetrovsk RSA, a police operation was carried out to liberate four districts of the Donetsk Oblast adjacent to the Dnipropetrovsk Oblast: Oleksandrivka Raion, Velyka Novosilka Raion, Dobropillia Raion and Krasnoarmiisk Raion. On May 11, 2014, the so-called “referendums on the status of Donbas” organized by Russia were disrupted in these districts of the Donetsk Oblast. Patriots of Ukraine were appointed heads of district administrations, as journalist Yuriy Butusov reported. In May - early June 2014, units of the Dnipro volunteer battalion, together with the Azov Battalion and units of internal troops, took part first in the defense of Mariupol, then in the liberation of this city from Russian control.

During Poroshenko’s visit to Dnipropetrovsk before the presidential elections, Kolomoyskyi and Korban tried to convince the future president that it was necessary to liberate the entire Donbas from occupation precisely through police operations because if the Armed Forces were involved on a large scale, the risk of symmetrical actions by Russia would be great.

=== The Hostage Release Center ===
On May 2, pro-Russian militants captured Mykola Yakubovych, an adviser to the Secretary of the National Security and Defense Council, who was officially engaged in negotiations with the militants who had seized the city in Donetsk. The wife and children of the hostage were urgently evacuated to Dnipropetrovsk. The militants wanted to exchange Yakubovych for one of their people and asked him who could handle the negotiations on his part. Yakubovych named reserve officer Volodymyr Ruban, head of the public organization “Officer Corps”. On May 5, Yakubovych and several other hostages were exchanged for people who were “interesting” to the militants, according to Yakubovych. Korban's support for Ruban's efforts to release the hostages began precisely with this case.

The most resonant case of the exchange was the so-called operation “Rendezvous”, when 17 people were exchanged for the Russian saboteur Olga Kulygina. The exchange took place on July 29, 2014. Korban recalled that the option of exchanging Kulygina for Nadiya Savchenko was considered, but Poroshenko “did not give the green light.”

With the support of the Dnipropetrovsk RSA, the Hostage Release Center “Officer Corps” was established in Dnipropetrovsk (the agreement on the establishment of the Center took place on July 3, officially announced on August 4, 2014).

The Center received support for most of its operations from the leadership of the Dnipropetrovsk RSA and the Country Defence Foundation. According to Serhiy Ivancha, the chief of staff of the Officer Corps, who personally participated in many operations to release hostages, thanks to well-coordinated work with Korban and the management of Dnipropetrovsk RSA, “it was possible to release almost 800 people from captivity, and also evacuate 130 old people and children from Donetsk”.

=== Body Identification Center in Dnipro ===
On June 14, 2014, at the Luhansk International Airport, the invaders shootdown an IL-76 with paratroopers from Dnipropetrovsk Oblast on board. The remains of the dead were delivered to Dnipropetrovsk from the scene of the tragedy at the expense of the Country Defence Foundation. There was a need to identify the bodies of paratroopers. Later, the bodies of the fallen military continued to be delivered to the city, which was a medical hub for the Anti-Terrorist Operation. According to Korban, since the beginning of 2015 the bodies of all soldiers killed in ATO had been transported only to Dnipropetrovsk Oblast. Therefore, the Body Identification Center with a DNA laboratory was established in Dnipro. As of March 19, 2015, more than 160 unidentified bodies of ATO soldiers were buried in Dnipro, 36 of them were identified.

=== The Center for Assistance to IDPs ===
Assistance to IDPs at the regional level became necessary in June 2014. Then the Dnipro Help (Dopomoga Dnipra) center was opened. Further, the Regional Coordination Center was created under the Dnipropetrovsk RSA. Displaced persons were provided with temporary accommodation, assistance in the restoration of lost documents, regular compensation, support for the education and upbringing of children in schools and kindergartens.

On January 26, 2015, it was officially announced that, at the initiative of Korban, industrial enterprises of the Dnipropetrovsk region would allocate quotas for the employment of IDPs.

At the beginning of February 2015, there were 87,000 IDPs in the Dnipropetrovsk region. In February, the Dnipropetrovsk region became the first region in Ukraine to receive 1.5 million euros directly from the EU to help IDPs.

=== Lines of defense in depth ===
In March 2015, Korban mentioned that after the Ilovaisk tragedy, in September–October 2014, the authorities of the Dnipropetrovsk Oblast constructed the lines of deep defense to protect the area from a possible Russian invasion. Later he testified, that after the liberation of four districts of the Donetsk Oblast and the city of Mariupol, the Dnipropetrovsk RSA, together with the Armed Forces of Ukraine, built defensive structures in the liberated areas, on which the Armed Forces of Ukraine and territorial defense units were subsequently deployed.

So, at the initiative of the Dnipropetrovsk RSA, the main lines for artillery and heavy equipment were created, which covered the Dnipropetrovsk and Zaporizhzhia regions.

=== Evacuation of children from the war zone ===
In January 2015, Russia launched a new offensive in the Donbas on several fronts. From January 20, the city of Avdiivka, located 6 km north of Donetsk, began to be subjected to continuous shelling by the invaders. As a result, from January 21, the city was deprived of electricity, heating and water. The head of the Main Directorate of the Ministry of Internal Affairs of the Donetsk Oblast, Viktor Abroskin, appealed to Korban for assistance in evacuating children from this area and their resettlement in the Dnipropetrovsk Oblast. As a result, 39 children were evacuated from Avdiivka and settled in children's sanatorium No. 2 in Dnipropetrovsk.

Another 68 children from the combat zone arrived in the Dnipropetrovsk Oblast at the end of January 2015 and were settled in the Nikopol boarding school.

=== Operation Exodus ===
On February 12, 2014, 130 people were evacuated from Donetsk and Horlivka to Dnipropetrovsk, including 22 children and 70 people over 55 years old. The evacuation was organized by Korban and carried out by the Hostage Release Center “Officer Corps” at the request of the Chief Rabbi of Dnipropetrovsk Shmuel Kaminetsky and the American Jewish Joint Distribution Committee.

=== Command Center of Operational Command South ===
At the beginning of 2015, in Dnipropetrovsk, volunteers from the Country Defence Foundation on private donations with the assistance of the leadership of the Dnipropetrovsk RSA created a unique Command Center of the Operational Command South. Thanks to the modern technical equipment of the Command Center, the headquarters of the OC South got the opportunity to quickly monitor the airspace, the situation on the roads, checkpoints and strategic facilities, maintain high-quality communication with military units.

=== Resignation ===
In March 2015, a conflict broke out between Governor Ihor Kolomoyskyi and President Petro Poroshenko. After President Poroshenko signed a decree on 24 March 2015 dismissing Kolomoyskyi as governor, Korban resigned.

== Political and social activities ==
=== Participation in parliamentary and local elections in 2015 ===
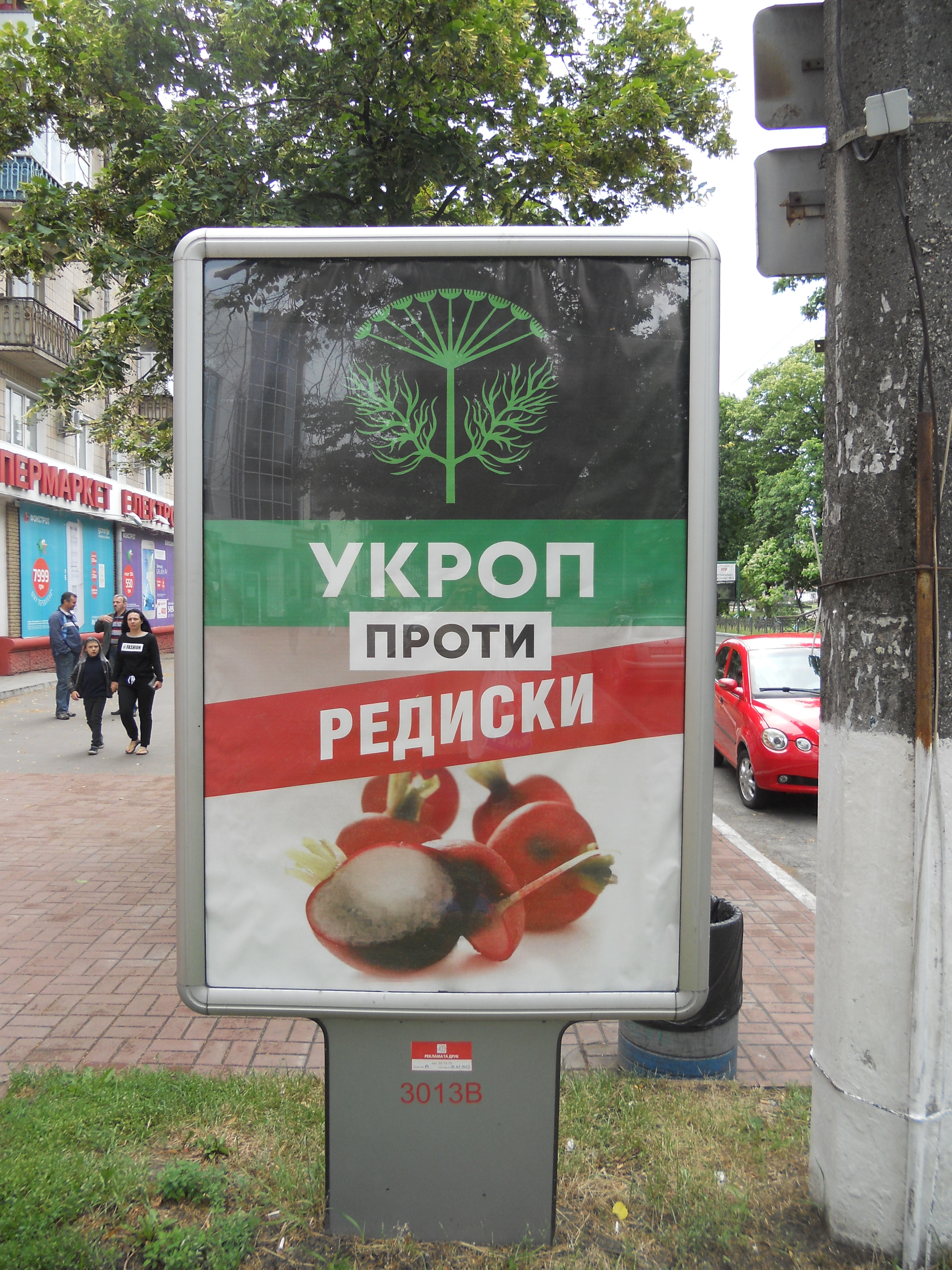
Dill vs radish (Укроп проти редиски) was one of the slogans of Korban (ad board in Chernihiv)

On 28 March 2015, Korban announced plans to run in the 2015 local elections if he could found a new patriotic and reformist political party.

On April 23, 2015, he announced his intention to run for parliamentary by-election in single-mandate constituency 205 in Chernihiv.

On July 12, 2015 Korban headed the political party UKROP (Ukrainian Association of Patriots).

By-election in Chernihiv was held on July 26, 2015. With 14.76% of the vote, he finished second behind Serhiy Berezenko of Petro Poroshenko Bloc, who won with 35.90% of the vote.

During the run-up to these elections, Korban and Berezenko were repeatedly accused of bribing voters and using black PR among other violations of electoral legislation.

Korban's allies in the UKROP party, MPs Andriy Denisenko and Vitaliy Kupriy, have publicly exposed the vote-buying system used by pro-presidential candidate Berezenko. This led to a scandal and worsened President Petro Poroshenko's attitude towards Korban and his political party.

On September 12, 2015, the UKROP party nominated Korban as a candidate for mayor of Kyiv in the local elections on October 25, 2015. In the first round, he took 10th place, gaining 2.61% of the vote.

The UKROP party also took part in the 2015 local elections throughout Ukraine. During the campaign, the party sharply criticized President Poroshenko and his party for their commitment to corrupt practices and positioned itself as a party of new generation in politics, true patriots of Ukraine, who are able to embody the ideals of the Revolution of Dignity and protect Ukraine from Russian aggression. Under the leadership of Korban, the new opposition party, following the results of the elections, took 4th place in terms of the number of votes cast for candidates for regional councils (7.43% of the vote).

=== Political persecution under President Poroshenko ===
On 31 October 2015, Korban was arrested. Four charges were brought against him, including a charge accusing him of embezzling money from the Defence Foundation, which he financed.

On 31 October and 1 November 2015 three parliamentary political Parties (Batkivshchyna, Samopomich and the Radical Party of Oleh Liashko) made public statements regarding Korban’s arrest of 31 October 2015 condemning it as politically motivated.

According to political analyst Tadeusz Iwański of the Center for Eastern Studies, Korban’s detention was the first case in Ukraine since the Maidan where the institutions of force had been used in a political struggle.

An attempt to impose a pre-trial restraint was made by three judicial authorities, including the Chernihiv District Court and the Pechersk District Court of Kyiv, but failed due to a lack of evidence. In November 2015, he was placed under house arrest for two months.

From December 24 to December 27, 2015, according to a March 2016 report from the United Nations High Commissioner for Human Rights, Korban was "forced to several procedural checks" despite having had heart surgery, after which he was "eventually forcefully transferred to court" for a hearing that "lasted for more than 24 hours and was marked by numerous violations of due process rights." During the trial, army veteran Valentyn Manko gave testimony against Korban, which was later found to be part of a scheme to provide false testimony and ensure a guilty verdict. In exchange for his testimony, robbery charges against Manko would be dropped. On December 27, the courtroom was stormed by unknown protesters who clashed with Korban supporters.

On January 23, 2016, while Korban was detained by the Security Service, the UKROP political council dismissed him as chairman of the party. In March 2016, a court granted him permission to travel to Israel for treatment at Tel Aviv Medical Center. On May 7, 2016, after Korban had fulfilled the demands of his political opponents, the court released him from arrest and granted him permission to leave for Israel.

On August 9, 2016, Mykola Chaus, the judge of the Dniprovskyi District Court of Kyiv who ordered the detention of Korban, was caught with a US$150,000 bribe by the National Anti-Corruption Bureau of Ukraine.

In September 2017, Korban was absolved of all charges due to a lack of evidence, while the main directorate of National Police in Dnipropetrovsk Oblast ceased criminal proceedings on his National Defence Foundation embezzlement charges due to a lack of evidence. On 13 December 2017, Korban returned to Ukraine.

Due to the fact that the Ukrainian authorities violated Korban's rights during the investigation and court proceedings, he turned to the European Court of Human Rights (ECHR). In a decision dated July 4, 2019, the ECHR recognized the violation of Korban's rights. In particular, the ECHR recognized as illegal the forced presence of Korban at court hearings after undergoing heart surgery in December 2015 (violation of Article 3 of the European Convention on Human Rights). The court also found a violation of Art. 3 Korban being caged during three court hearings in January 2016.

According to Korban, President Petro Poroshenko, as well as his associates MP Oleksandr Hranovskyi, Ihor Kononenko and then Prosecutor General of Ukraine Viktor Shokin, were the customers behind his persecution. After the ECHR recognized the violation of his rights, he appealed to them demanding compensation for material, moral and physical damage.

=== Russian sanctions ===
On November 1, 2018, Russia imposed sanctions against 322 citizens of Ukraine, including Korban, “in connection with unfriendly actions of Ukraine towards citizens and legal entities of the Russian Federation”.

=== Korban’s current social activity in Dnipro ===
On March 5, 2020, Korban headed the Community Board, a consultative body to the Dnipro City Council. It includes 12 specialized committees. Korban himself is engaged in the implementation of projects in the field of culture. In particular, with his assistance, the architectural studio Zaha Hadid and one of the oldest auction houses Sotheby's began their work in the Dnipro. Zaha Hadid Architects designed three new stations of the Dnipro Metro: Tsentralna, Teatralna and Muzeina, which were scheduled to open in 2024. Sotheby’s has been developing the concept of a contemporary art museum in Dnipro.

Also in March 2020, Korban announced the opening of a large non-state cultural center in Dnipro. According to him, the cultural embassy of the Czech Republic and the French cultural center “Alliance française” agreed to be residents there. In October 2020, the Dnipro Center for Contemporary Culture was opened.

After the beginning of the full-scale Russian invasion of Ukraine, on February 28, 2022, mayor Borys Filatov appointed him Chief of Staff of the Dnipro Defense Council.

== Ratings ==
In 2007, Focus magazine included Korban in the rating of 50 most influential residents of Dnipropetrovsk. In 2013, Forbes magazine published the 100 richest Ukrainians rating, in which Korban took 77th place with a fortune of $153 million. He also took 7th place in the list of the richest businessmen in Dnipropetrovsk.

In 2014–2015, Korban was included in the rating of 100 most influential Ukrainians according to Focus magazine.

In 2015, Focus magazine placed Korban in 100th place in the ranking of 100 richest people in Ukraine, estimating his fortune at $40 million. In 2016, he was in 95th place with a fortune of $37 million.

In 2019, NV magazine named Korban the most influential person in Dnipro.

== State awards ==
On September 15, 2014, he was awarded the 3d Class Order for Courage for courage and dedication, active citizenship and high professionalism shown in the line of duty.

On May 19, 2022, Minister of Defense Oleksii Reznikov awarded Korban with the medal “For Assistance to the Armed Forces of Ukraine” with the wording “for a significant personal contribution to the protection of the territorial integrity of Ukraine”.

== Art collection ==
Korban is a collector of modern and contemporary art. His collection includes works of Gustav Klimt, Damien Hirst, Egon Schiele, Alexej von Jawlensky, Tamara de Lempicka, Takashi Murakami, Andreas Gursky, Yayoi Kusama and Banksy, among others.
