= ETUT =

Research Project on Transportation Systems

Marie Skłodowska-Curie Actions: ETUT
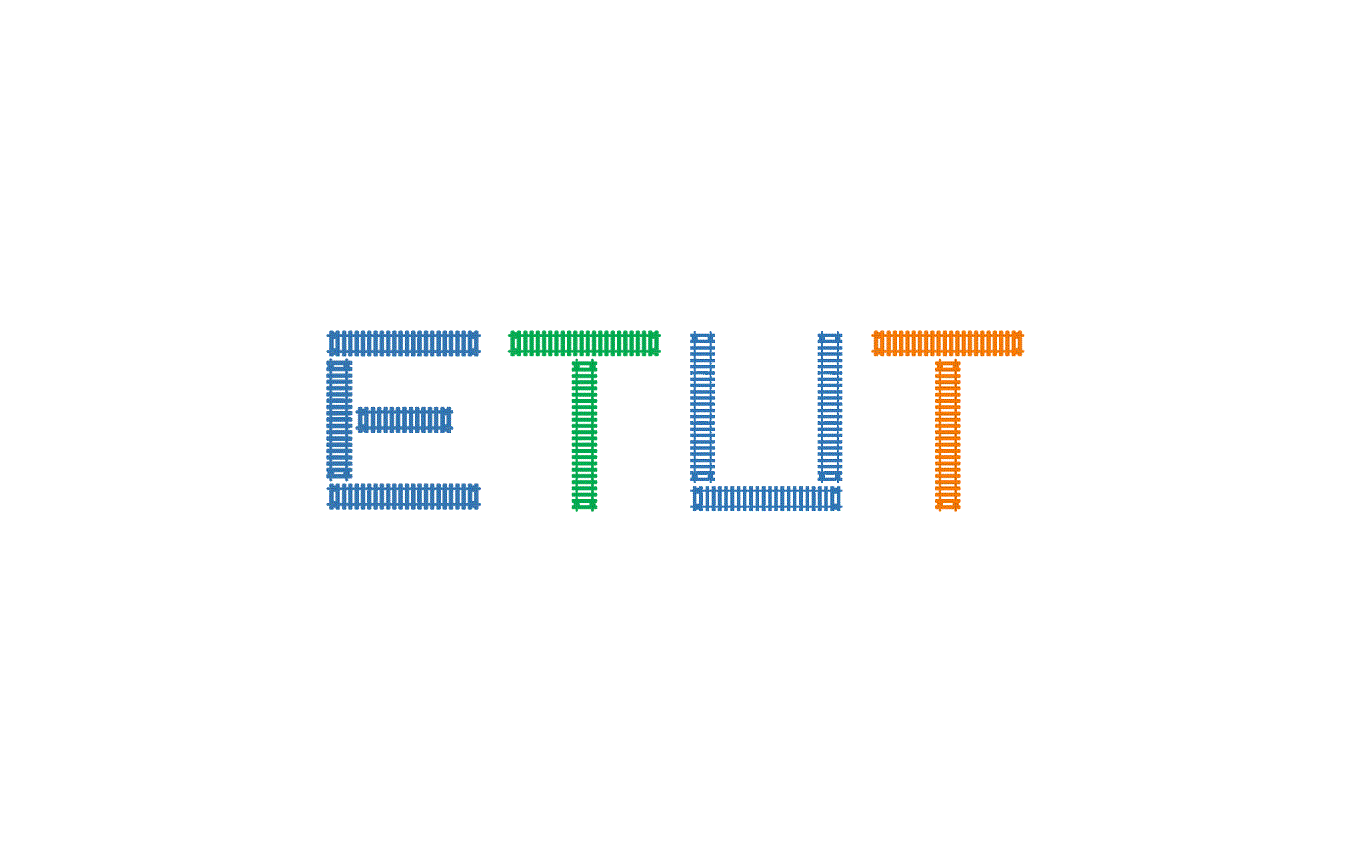
- Founder: European Union
- Country: United Kingdom: Netherlands; Ukraine
- Key people: Kayleigh Phillips (University of Nottingham) Lillian Hannik (University of Twente) Jan Beerens (University of Twente)
- Website: https://www.etut-itn.org/

ETUT (European Training network in collaboration with Ukraine for electrical Transport) is a research project funded by the European Commission's Horizon 2020 program under the Marie Sktodowska-Curie Actions Innovative Training Networks (MSCA- ITN) scheme. The project, undertaken by a collaborative effort of the University of Twente, the University of Nottingham, and Dnipro National University of Railway Transport, aims to develop efficient interfacing technology for more-electric transport amidst the ever-increasing demand in transportation systems which contribute to increased carbon dioxide emissions. The project has employed 12 Early Stage Researches (doctoral candidates) who will work closely with six industrial partners to improve upon the existing electrical and energy storage systems that will help in alleviating the reliance on non-renewable energy sources for large-scale transportation systems such as railways and maritime transport. The project is segregated into two main groups with one focusing on power electronics for efficient use of energy resources in power delivery, and the other on electromagnetic compatibility of such systems.

== History ==
With the increasing use of solid-state devices in transportation systems, a number of electromagnetic interference and interoperability problems are occurring which could hinder the electrification of transport on a global scale. This requires a closer inspection of the interaction of power electronic converters with equipment of the information and communications technology. With this in mind, MSCA ETUT brought together researchers from different academic backgrounds spanning all over the globe to contrive innovative ways of countering these problems. Jan Abraham Ferreira (IEEE Fellow, former President of IEEE Power Electronics Society), Frank Leferink (IEEE Fellow and Director EMC at Thales Nederland), Patrick Wheeler (IEEE Fellow and Global Director of the University of Nottingham's Institute of Aerospace Technology), Gert Rietveld (IEEE Senior Member, Chief Metrologist at Van Swinden Laboratorium), Dave Thomas (IEEE Senior Member and Head of the George Green Institute for Electromagnetics Research), Thiago Batista Soeiro (IEEE Senior Member) are some of the prominent members of this programme. The project officially started on March 1, 2021, and is set to culminate on February 28, 2025. Shortly after the commencement, J.A. Ferreira, a pioneering member of the project passed away.

== Events ==
Summer School I: Enschede, Netherlands, 2022

Summer School II: Nottingham, U.K., 2023

Summer School III: Enschede, Netherlands, 2024

== Universities, Industrial Partners and Personnel ==
Universities

- University of Twente
- University of Nottingham
- Dnipro National University of Railway Transport

Industrial Partners

- Network Rail
- Thales
- Prydniprovska Railway
- Lambda Engineering
- VSL - Dutch Metrology Institute
- MM Tech Ltd.
- Transautomatic Ltd.
