= Borys Filatov =

Ukrainian politician, journalist, lawyer, and businessman

- Борис Філатов
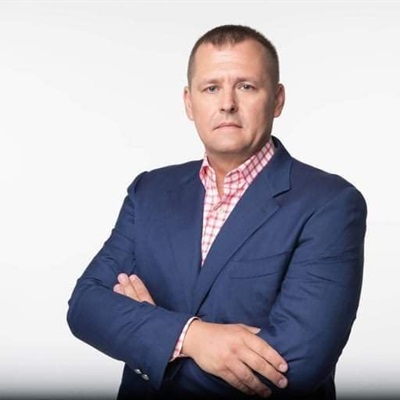
- Official portrait, 2023

Mayor of Dnipro
- Incumbent
- Assumed office 15 November 2015
- Preceded by: Ivan Kulichenko

People's Deputy of Ukraine
- Preceded by: Oleksandr Momot
- Succeeded by: Tetiana Rychkova
- Constituency: Dnipropetrovsk Oblast, No. 27

Personal details
- Born: 7 March 1972 (age 54) Dnipropetrovsk, Ukrainian SSR, Soviet Union (now Dnipro, Ukraine)
- Party: Proposition
- Other political affiliations: UKROP
- Education: Oles Honchar Dnipro National University
- Awards

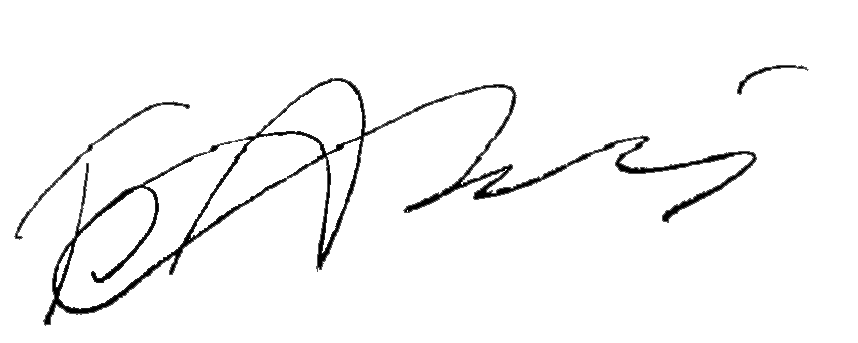
- Signature

Borys Albertovych Filatov (Ukrainian: Борис Альбертович Філатов; born 7 March 1972) is a Ukrainian politician, journalist, lawyer, businessman, and the current mayor of Dnipro. (Note: During Filatov's tenure as Mayor (the city) Dnipropetrovsk was renamed Dnipro in 2016 to comply with decommunization laws.) In 2014 and 2015, he was a People's Deputy of Ukraine. He is one of the leaders and founders of the political party Proposition.

Filatov is a member of the Presidium of the First Congress of Local and Regional Authorities under the President of Ukraine. On 4 March 2014, he was appointed Deputy Head of the Dnipropetrovsk Regional State Administration for Internal Policy. On 6 November 2014, by the decision of the Central Election Commission of Ukraine, he was declared the winner of the elections in the 27th electoral district (Dnipro).

== Early life ==
Borys Filatov was born on 7 March 1972 in Dnipropetrovsk (now Dnipro) into a family of teachers. His father, Albert Borysovych Filatov, was a lecturer at the Department of Philosophy at Dnipro State University, where he worked for 20 years. His mother, Luiza Trokhymivna Filatova, taught Russian language and literature at the Chemical Technology and Metallurgical Institutes.

=== Education ===
He went to first grade in Bamako, the capital of Mali. His parents lived there at a former French air force base. He studied for only one year, after which the family returned to Dnipro. He studied at Dnipro school No. 73.

In 1993, he graduated with honours from Oles Honchar Dnipro National University with two degrees: History and Social Studies and Law.

In 1997, he defended his PhD thesis at the National University Odesa Law Academy in the speciality Theory of Law. Philosophy of Law. At that time, he was the youngest candidate of law in Ukraine.

=== Lawyer activities ===
In 2000, he received a certificate to practice law. Filatov started a lawyer's business, worked as a legal adviser and lecturer in civil law at the Academy of the Customs Service of Ukraine. He participated in court cases, including those related to the interests of oligarch Ihor Kolomoiskyi. Filatov is believed to be a staff lawyer of the Privat Group, specialising in the redistribution of corporate property.

Borys Filatov himself denies this, as during the same period he supported the processes related to Mykolaiv Alumina Plant, Odesaoblenergo, Ingulets Iron Ore dressing Works, Central Iron Ore Enrichment Works and other enterprises to which Privat Group has no relation. Filatov has cooperated with a large number of financial and industrial groups in Ukraine.

In the course of his legal practice, Filatov often came into conflict with politicians who supported his opponents. In particular, with MPs Inna Bohoslovska and Svyatoslav Oliynyk, the head of the Dnipro Regional State Administration Volodymyr Yatsuba, and former Prime Minister Pavlo Lazarenko.

=== Journalism ===
In 2005, Borys Filatov began his journalistic career. He hosted the author's television project Gubernski Chronicles on Channel 9, a regional TV channel in Dnipro. In the course of his journalistic career, Borys Filatov paid great attention to investigations into the activities of former Prime Minister Pavlo Lazarenko. As a result of the investigations, two television films were made, which revealed the essence of the charges brought against Lazarenko in the United States, and a book was published, The Lazarenko Phenomenon (2008).

In 2010, he moved to Dnipropetrovsk Regional State Television and Radio Company, where he hosted the Gubernski Prognozy (Provincial Forecasts).

Borys Filatov has made a number of TV films about his travels: Yugoslav Chronicles (2005) — about the aftermath of the Yugoslav Wars; Arab Chronicles (2006) — about the destruction of negative stereotypes about Middle Eastern countries; American Chronicles (2007, 2 parts) — about the customs and life of the American hinterland; Canadian Chronicles (2008, 3 parts) — about the fate of members of the Ukrainian diaspora; European Chronicles (2009, 4 parts) — about the pros and cons of living in a united Europe; African Chronicles (2010–2011, 3 parts) — about tribal hatred (tribalism), which can destroy not only Africa but also Ukraine.

== Political career ==
=== Euromaidan ===
During the Revolution of Dignity, he organizationally and financially supported the protests in Dnipropetrovsk, provided the protesters with legal and informational assistance. For this activity, together with his business partner Gennadii Korban, he was persecuted by Deputy Prime Minister Oleksandr Vilkul, who influenced the regional authorities.

The persecution of Filatov and Korban began after the protesters were dispersed on January 26. According to Borys Filatov, Berkut squads searched the offices of Korban, Filatov and partners under the pretext of looking for extremists. They did not have documents authorizing the search. One of the well-known “Maidan judges” (judges who persecuted Euromaidan activists) Mykola Bibik, decided to forcibly bring Korban and Filatov to court, which in fact meant detention and arrest.

On January 28, Filatov and Korban left Ukraine, after declaring that they were being persecuted for their citizen’s position by the authorities of the Dnipropetrovsk region, supervised by Deputy Prime Minister Oleksandr Vilkul. As Korban recalls, Ihor Kolomoyskyi provided them with his private jet for an urgent departure from Ukraine.

On January 30, 2014, Filatov announced that the court's decision to bring them to court was officially cancelled. However, the pressure on the supporters of the Maidan continued. Borys Filatov described the situation in Dnipro:

“Students and high school students are massively detained in the city. Arrests are issued for found Euromaidan flags. They wanted to cut down the front door of our employee's apartment, because they came to search for explosives.”

— Borys Filatov

On February 2, Filatov and Korban were invited to Knesset and met with the deputies there, and in the evening Knesset Speaker Yuli Edelstein had an informal conversation with them.

=== Dnipropetrovsk Regional State Administration ===
On 4 March 2014, he was appointed Deputy Chairman of Dnipropetrovsk Regional State Administration on internal affairs.

On 17 April 2014, during the Russo-Ukrainian war, he offered a monetary reward for "mercenaries", liberated administrative buildings and weapons.

=== Verkhovna Rada ===
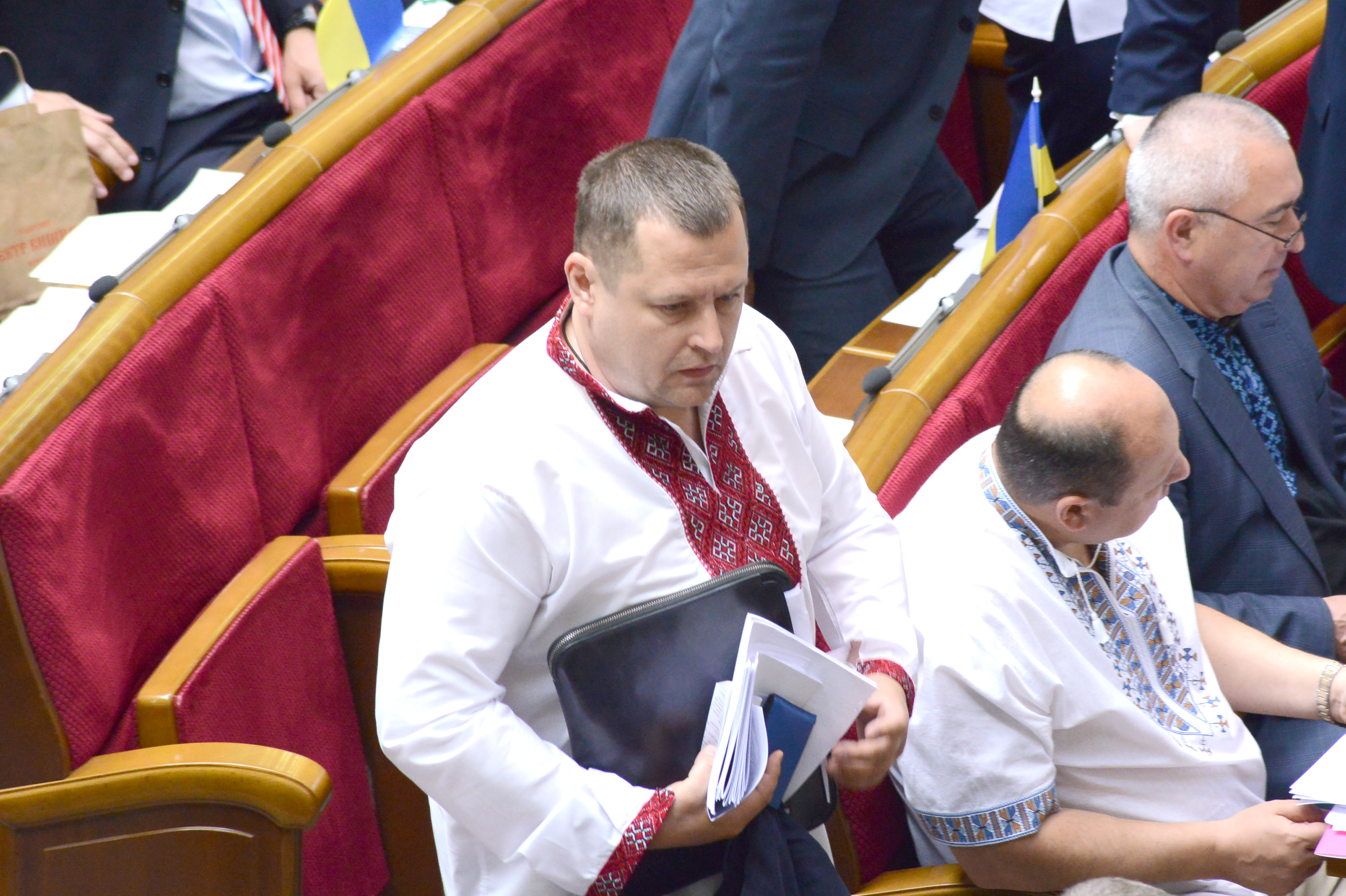
Borys Filatov in the Verkhovna Rada, May 2015

In the 2014 Ukrainian parliamentary election Filatov as an independent candidate won a single-member district located in Dnipropetrovsk with 56.66% of the votes and became thus a member of the Ukrainian parliament (on 27 November 2014). In parliament, he joined the inter-fractional group UKROP.

On 24 November 2015, after being elected mayor of Dnipro, he wrote a letter of resignation as a member of the Ukrainian parliament, but on 26 November the Verkhovna Rada did not support his statement and his powers were withdrawn only a month later, on 24 December.

=== Mayor of Dnipro ===
In the 2015 Ukrainian local elections Filatov was elected Mayor of Dnipropetrovsk (on 15 November 2015) as a UKROP representative. On 24 November 2015 Filatov resigned as member of parliament.

In the first year of his term, he managed to agree a contract with a Turkish company for the further construction of the Dnipro Metro. In the spring of 2016, the city began the first major overhaul of the Tsentralny Bridge in more than half a century. The city also started providing systematic support to Joint Forces Operation soldiers and their families. In the summer of 2017, trolleybuses with autonomous running, unique for Ukraine, appeared in Dnipro.

In June 2020 Filatov was one of the founders and joined the new party Proposition.

Filatov was reelected Mayor of Dnipro in the 2020 Ukrainian local elections, this time as a member of Proposition.

On 16 May 2021, on Filatov's personal order, the state flag of Israel was raised over the Dnipro City Council in solidarity.

On 9 February 2022, the official flag of Belarus was replaced with a white-red-white flag at the entrance to the Dnipro city council building on the Alley of the Multinational City. The next day, the Prosecutor's Office of Belarus opened a criminal case against Filatov for "inciting national hatred". The Belarusian Foreign Ministry sent a note of protest to the Ukrainian side. The demand was to return the Belarusian state flag to its place.

In 2023, he became one of the 15 leaders in the "Public Administration" category of the List of Leaders of Ukraine UP-100 rating by Ukrainska Pravda.

== Social activities ==
In October 2007, Borys Filatov organised a fundraiser to help people affected by a domestic gas explosion in a residential building on Mandrykivska Street in Dnipro, which killed 23 people, including 9 children. In five days, he managed to raise over UAH 3 million, which was divided among the residents of the destroyed building. Almost half of the money was transferred by businessman Vadym Novynskyi, who was approached by Filatov.

In May 2011, at the annual congress of the International Netsuke Society, Boris Filatov was elected chairman of the CIS branch. After the annexation of Crimea in March 2014, Filatov resigned from his position as chairman of the branch.

In October 2011, Borys Filatov had an audience with Her Imperial Majesty, Princess Takamado of Japan, the widow of the current Emperor Akihito's cousin. During the audience, Filatov told the princess about the development of Ukrainian-Japanese relations, research into the history of netsuke, the promotion of netsuke culture in Ukraine, and the work of the branch of the International Society of Netsuke Collectors in the CIS, of which he is the chairman.

Borys Filatov is the chairman of the organising committee of the international sailing project Around the World on the Old Slavic Boat Rusych. He regularly provides support, including financial, to well-known travellers - brothers Serhiy and Oleksandr Sinelnyk, Ihor Sokolov, and other enthusiastic travellers from Ukraine and the CIS countries.

He is in charge of the cultural projects Nomads and Ukraine through the Eyes of Birds. As part of the first project, a photo exhibition of motorcycle travellers' works is organised every two years in Kyiv and Dnipro. As part of the second project, an album of unique bird's-eye views of Ukraine is being prepared. This project involves young but already internationally recognised and well-known Ukrainian photographers.

Filatov is a member of the Board of Trustees of the European Association of Ukrainians (based in Brussels), which brings together Ukrainians who have lived in the EU for a long time. Borys is a church elder of the newly built St John Chrysostom Church in Dnipro.

== Controversies ==
In September 2014, Filatov threatened in public journalist Anatoly Shariy, using obscene words and promising to beat the journalist.

On 7 April 2020, Oleksandr Dubinsky shared a screenshot (supposedly fake) on his Facebook page in which, on behalf of Filatov, it was promised to shoot pets that residents walk in parks during quarantine. Later on, Dubinsky placed another statement saying that Filatov removed his initial post about pets from his page and affronted the mayor. In comments section under the Dubinsky’s post with insults, Filatov threatened Dubinsky using foul language with mutilations to be inflicted once they meet and literally said that Benia’s (presumably local oligarch Ihor Kolomoyskyi’s) security staff won’t save him. Moreover, Filatov published a post himself where he called (likely) Dubinsky a "Bearded Nana’s (a local nickname for Kolomoyskyi) sidekick".

== Recognition ==
From 2014 to 2021, Borys Filatov was included in the ranking of the 100 Most Influential Ukrainians according to Focus magazine. In 2014, the magazine noted that Filatov organised the construction of defence structures, took care of the removal, treatment and rehabilitation of the wounded from the Joint Forces Operation zone, and participated in negotiations for the release of captured Ukrainian soldiers - many of them returned to their families.

In 2019, Focus noted that Borys Filatov remains in the mayor's chair not only because of his ability to succeed in crisis situations. He pays special attention to PR, and is known for his expressive vocabulary on Facebook, where he does not hesitate to comment on what is happening in Ukraine. In 2021, journalists noted that the ambitious construction plans announced by Borys Filatov at the beginning of the year have begun to be implemented. In almost every district of the city in 2021, construction or renovation work is underway. The projects are large-scale: some are two-level embankments, some are large sports complexes, some are park areas.

=== Ratings ===
According to the rating of Focus magazine 100 Most Influential Ukrainians:

- 2014 — No. 52;
- 2015 — No. 66;
- 2016 — No. 66;
- 2017 — No. 53;
- 2018 — No. 70;
- 2019 — No. 67;
- 2020 — No. 77;
- 2021 — No. 68.

== Awards ==
- Honoured Journalist of Ukraine (13 November 2008) — for his significant personal contribution to the development of television and radio broadcasting in Ukraine, creation of creative and thematic programmes, broad public awareness, and high professional skills.
- Jubilee Order of the Holy Synod of the Ukrainian Orthodox Church of Prince Volodymyr, Equal to the Apostles, "1020th Anniversary of the Baptism of Rus" (December 2008).
- Order of the Theotokos of Pochayiv (November 2009).
- Order of Merit III class (15 September 2014) — for his significant personal contribution to state building, implementation of development programmes in the Dnipro region, and many years of conscientious work.
- Commemorative patriotic medal "For the Defence of Donbas" (2015) — awarded by the Right Sector.
