= UKROP =

Political party in Ukraine

Ukrainian Association of Patriots Українське об'єднання патріотів
- Abbreviation: UKROP (УКРОП)
- Leader: Taras Batenko
- Founder: Hennadiy Korban
- Founded: 18 June 2015
- Registered: 25 September 2014
- Dissolved: June 2020 (de facto)
- Merged into: For the Future (de facto)
- Headquarters: Kyiv
- Ideology: Ukrainian nationalism; Social market economy
- Political position: Syncretic
- Colours: Green

Party flag

Website
- ukrop.party

UKROP (Ukrainian: УКРОП, lit. 'dill' in Russian), short for the Ukrainian Association of Patriots (Ukrainian: Українське об'єднання патріотів, romanized: Ukrainske obiednannia patriotiv), was a political party in Ukraine.

UKROP was established months after the Euromaidan Revolution of February 2014. The core of the party comprised civil society activists, participants of Euromaidan, volunteers and members of Ukrainian territorial defense battalions.

In the 2019 Ukrainian parliamentary election the party won 3 seats in single-seat constituencies, but these were won by UKROP members as candidates for Servant of the People (the two parties had no formal allegiance). UKROP itself did not take part in the election.

The name "ukrop" was initially a derogatory Russian slang term used to refer to Ukrainians; however, in this case some Ukrainians reclaimed the term "ukrop" to refer to themselves.

== History ==
On 2 December 2014, in the Ukrainian Parliament was established an inter-factional group called UKROP. It includes non-faction MPs Dmytro Yarosh, Andriy Biletsky, Boryslav Bereza, Borys Filatov and Volodymyr Parasiuk. Following the resignation of multibillionaire Ihor Kolomoyskyi from the post of governor of Dnipropetrovsk Oblast, members of his team announced their intention to build a new political force.

The political party UKROP was founded on 18 June 2015, transformed from the party Patriotic Alliance ("Патриотический альянс") registered on September 25, 2014. The head of the party's political council became oligarch Hennadiy Korban.

The party logo was designed earlier by Ukrainian artist Andriy Yermolenko to serve as a sleeve badge for the participants of the war in Donbas. The author released it for the use by the party for a symbolic fee of ₴1. In its turn, the word "ukrop" ("укроп") used by Yermolenko was a repurposed Russian ethnic slur for Ukrainians. Korban was deputy governor of Kolomoyskyi when Kolomoyskyi was governor of Dnipropetrovsk Oblast from 2 March 2014 until 24 March 2015.

The party's first political activity was when Korban took part in the 26 July 2015 parliamentary by-election in constituency 205 located in Chernihiv (He lost these elections to Serhiy Berezenko of the Petro Poroshenko Bloc, who won with 35.90% of the vote). Korban took second place with 14.76%. During the run-up to these elections Korban was repeatedly accused of bribing voters, the use of black PR and other violations (of the electoral legislation). Berezenko was accused of employing these tactics as well.

The party took part in the 25 October 2015 Ukrainian local elections, with their best region being Dnipropetrovsk. In this city its candidate Borys Filatov was elected Mayor. (Note: In June 2020 Borys Filatov was one of the founders and joined the new party Proposition.) Nationwide (in this election) the party won nationwide eight percent of the total vote. This did not lead to being one of the top seat gainers of the elections.

In 2015 the Ukrainian media reported that the party was allied to Ukrainian oligarch Ihor Kolomoyskyi. Korban was his deputy governor when Kolomoyskyi was governor of Dnipropetrovsk Oblast from 2 March 2014 until 24 March 2015.

On 31 October 2015, Korban was arrested and suspected to be head of organized crime group. The party claims offices of other party members and party offices were also searched by police.

During 17 July 2016 constituency mid-term elections the party won its first two seats in the Ukrainian parliament.

During its November 2016 party congress Kolomoyskyi was elected into the party leadership. By then Korban was not a member of UKROP anymore.

On 23 March 2018 UKROP member Oleksandr Savchenko was appointed Governor of Volyn Oblast.

In the 2019 Ukrainian parliamentary election the party won 3 seats in single-seat constituencies, but these seats were won by UKROP members as candidates for Servant of the People (the two parties had no formal allegiance). UKROP itself did not take part in the election. Former prominent UKROP member Ihor Palytsia has stated that de facto since 2020 UKROP's is replaced by the party For the Future. Indeed, UKROP's social media pages were re-branded as "For the Future" social media pages.

In the 2020 Ukrainian local elections 1 person won a local seat on behalf of UKROP.

== Ideology and political positions ==
Tom Burridge of BBC News has described UKROP as a centre-left party, while the European Centre for Tolerance, the European Centre for Democracy Development and the Institute for Ethnic Policy and Interethnic Relations Studies describe UKROP as right-wing. Deutsche Welle described the party as "right-wing nationalist".

The party claims it will create a "New Ukraine" with a social market economy including social welfare programs (including free internet access, environmental reimbursements for healthcare costs, and a public option for those who cannot afford healthcare), nationalization, environmentalism, public-private partnerships, and use of minimal regulation to guarantee "socially responsible business" in Ukraine. It claims that the Russian Federation is a Fascist regime comparable to Hitler's Germany and wants Ukrainian membership in NATO and the EU.

The party also claims it seeks center-right economic reforms. "We support middle class entrepreneurship, de-monopolization, lowering trade barriers and simplification of tax laws, but with an emphasis on patriotism."

The party aims the "complete destruction of the existing bureaucratic corruption system", "new faces in all branches of government and law enforcement agencies, the creation of a new Constitution and gradual "zeroing" of all laws, transparent funding of political parties, as well as the nationalization of strategically important enterprises."
