= Ukrop =

Ethnic slur for Ukrainians

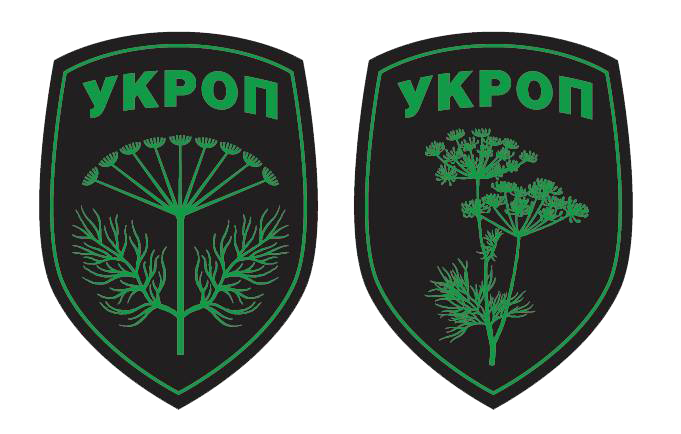
Shoulder sleeve insignias

Ukrop (Russian: укроп, pronounced [ʊˈkrop]; literally "dill") is a Russian-language deriding term for Ukrainians. The term is a reference to the dill plant and bears a superficial syntactical similarity with the first half of the Russian word for Ukrainians.

It was reclaimed as an ironic nickname by Ukrainian soldiers in 2014 during the war in Donbas, and a shoulder patch was designed by Andriy Yermolenko. The ironic use lost popularity after it was adopted as the name of the Ukrainian political party UKROP.
