= Andriy Khvetkevych =

Ukrainian world-class freediver

- Андрій Хветкевич
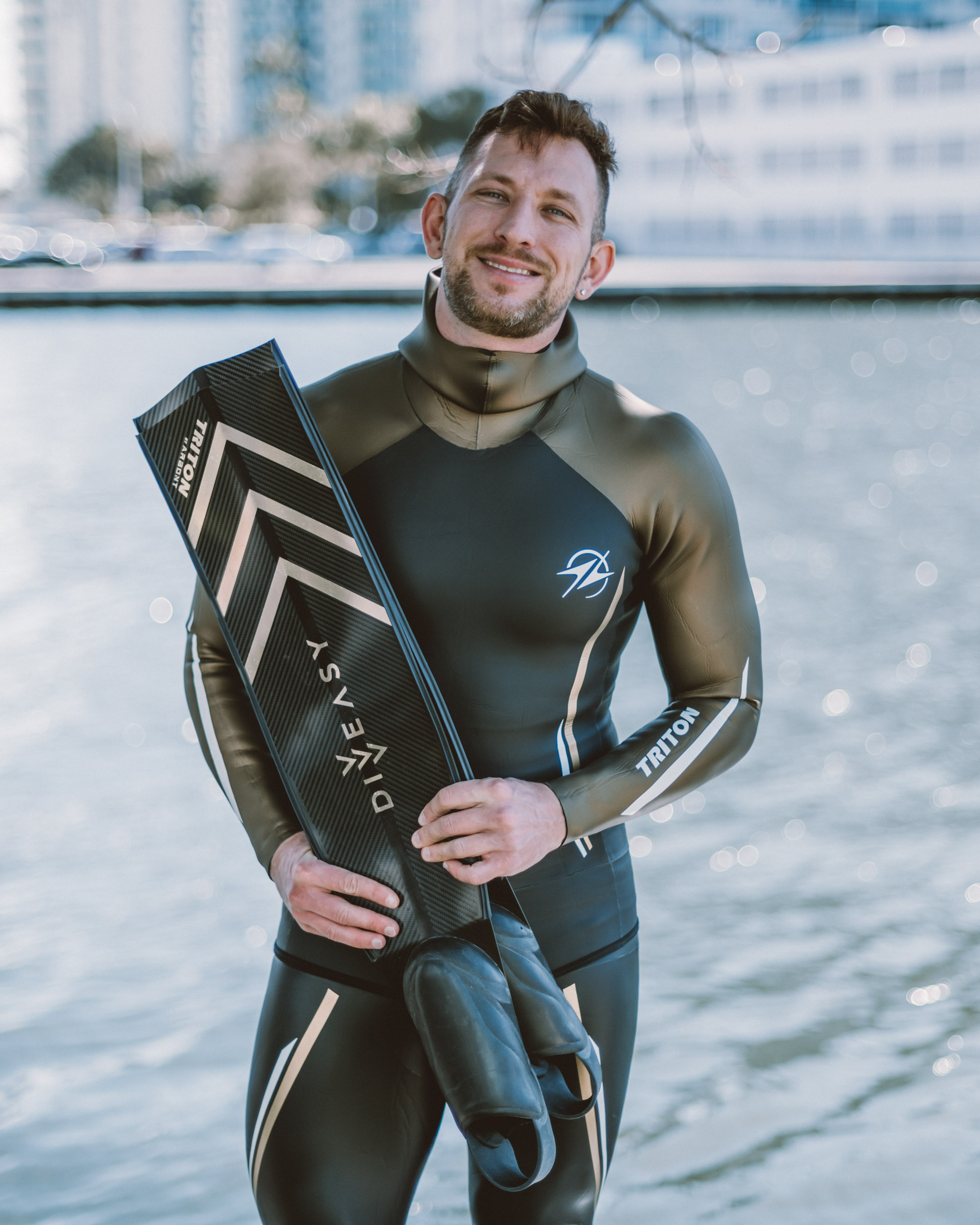
- Khvetkevych in 2020
- Born: Andriy Yevhenovych Khvetkevych; March 8, 1983 (age 43); Dnipro, Dnipropetrovsk Oblast, Ukrainian SSR, Soviet Union
- Education: National Metallurgical Academy of Ukraine
- Occupations: Free-diver; businessman

Andriy Yevhenovych Khvetkevych (Ukrainian: Андрій Євгенович Хветкевич; born March 8, 1983) is a Ukrainian world-class freediver, world and Ukrainian six-time record holder in three of the four deep disciplines in freediving: CWTB, FIM, CNF. He was a contestant on the second season of Kholostiachka, the Ukrainian adaptation of The Bachelorette.

== Biography ==
Khvetkevych was born March 8, 1983, in Dnipro. In 2005 Khvetkevych graduated with a bachelor's degree in Cybernetics from the National Metallurgical Academy of Ukraine

In 2008, Khvetkevych graduated with a master's degree in Intellectual Property from the Ukrainian State Institute of Intellectual Property.

In 2017, he started training in apnea and free-diving. In 2018 he set his first National Record for Ukraine in the Vertical Blue Competition with 71m in CNF (Constant Weight No-Fins) discipline, certified by AIDA Judges. He is the first Individual Champion, competing for two different countries: Ukraine by AIDA and US by CMAS.

His achievements have been recognized with AIDA and CMAS organizations.

== Records ==
Competition name	Date of attempt	Discipline	Announced depth	Performed depth	Result	Points	Description
AIDA Depth World Championship 2019	2019/09/11	FIM	95 m	95 m	White	95	OK, National Record
AIDA Caribbean Cup 2019	2019/08/02	FIM	92 m	92 m	White	92	OK, National Record
Philippine Depth National Championship 2019	2019/05/18	CWTB	80 m	80 m	White	80	OK, National Record
Xibalba 2019	2019/04/24	CWTB	75 m	75 m	White	75	OK, National Record
Vertical Blue	2018/07/26	CNF	71 m	71 m	White	71	OK, National Record
Vertical Blue	2018/07/16	CNF	66 m	66 m	White	66	OK, National Record

== Filmography ==
- Kholostiachka (2021)

== Personal life ==
On August 18, 2022, Khvetkevych came out and announced his engagement to his male partner.
