= Ukrainian State University of Science and Technologies =

University in Ukraine

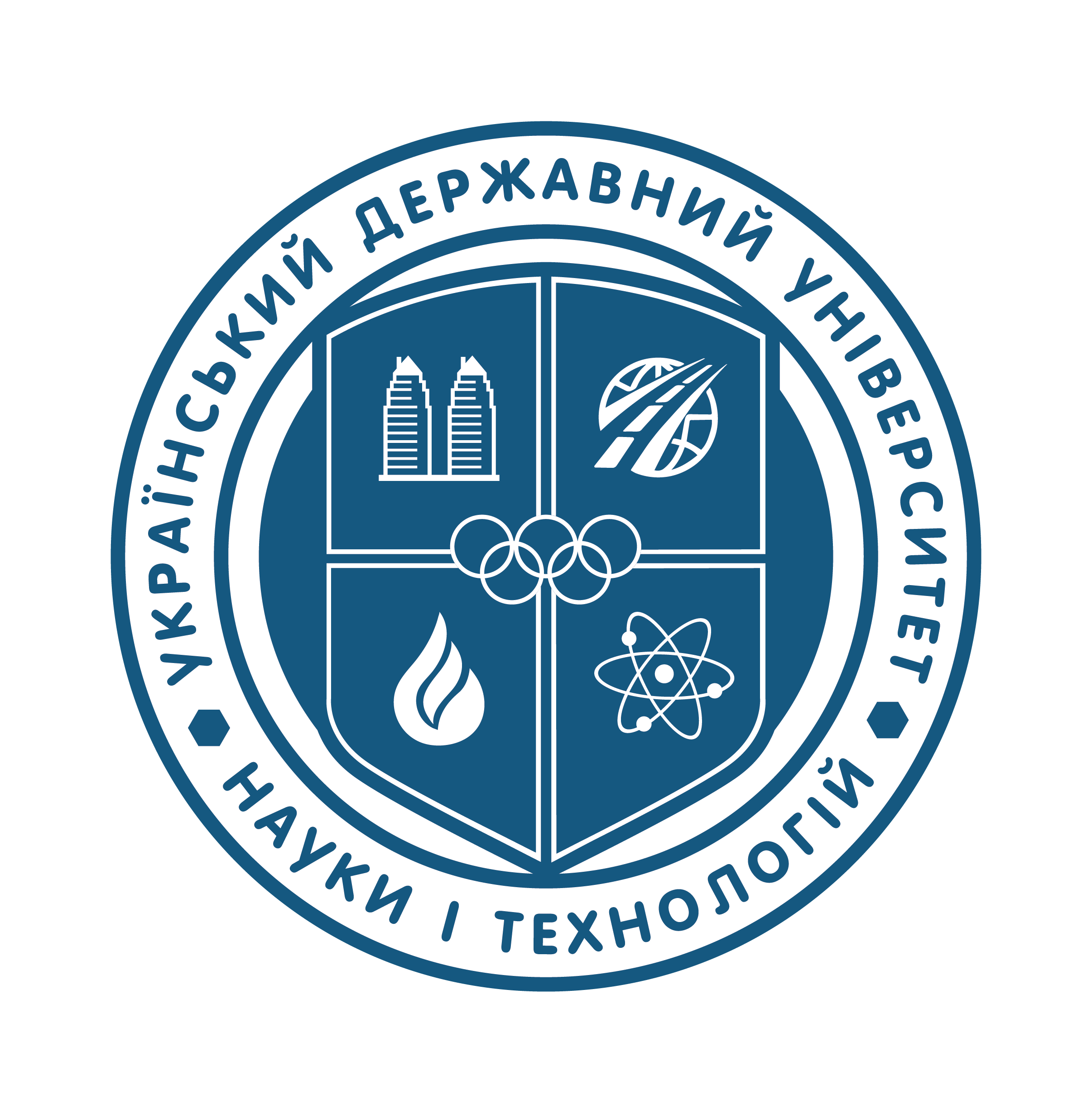
Logo

The Ukrainian State University of Science and Technologies (Ukrainian: Український державний університет науки і технологій, romanized: Ukrajinsjkyj derzhavnyj universytet nauky i texnologhij, abbreviated УДУНТ or UDUNT) is a state-sponsored university based in the city of Dnipro, Ukraine. It was established on 31 March 2021 as an umbrella institution, initially incorporating the Dnipro Institute of Infrastructure and Transport (previously "Dnipro National University of Railway Transport") and the National Metallurgical Academy of Ukraine (until 1999 "Dnipropetrovsk Metallurgical Institute").

Later on, the Prydniprovska State Academy of Civil Engineering and Architecture and several other institutions of higher education of Dnipro were also merged with the State University. The new university combines multi-disciplinary institutes of education and research to conduct activities at various levels of higher education and fundamental and applied scientific research. The university has a developed infrastructure of educational, scientific and industrial divisions, promotes the dissemination of scientific knowledge and cultural and educational activities. It is included into top-40 list of Ukrainian Universities per SciVerse Scopus. In 2022, its head Oleksandr Shpinko died, succeeded by rector Oleksandr Velychko.

== General information ==
The university has 16 faculties. 68 departments prepare candidates for 160 educational programs (73 Bachelor's programs, 70 Master's programs, 17 Doctor of Philosophy programs).
