= Taras Batenko =

Ukrainian politician and historian

- Тарас Батенко
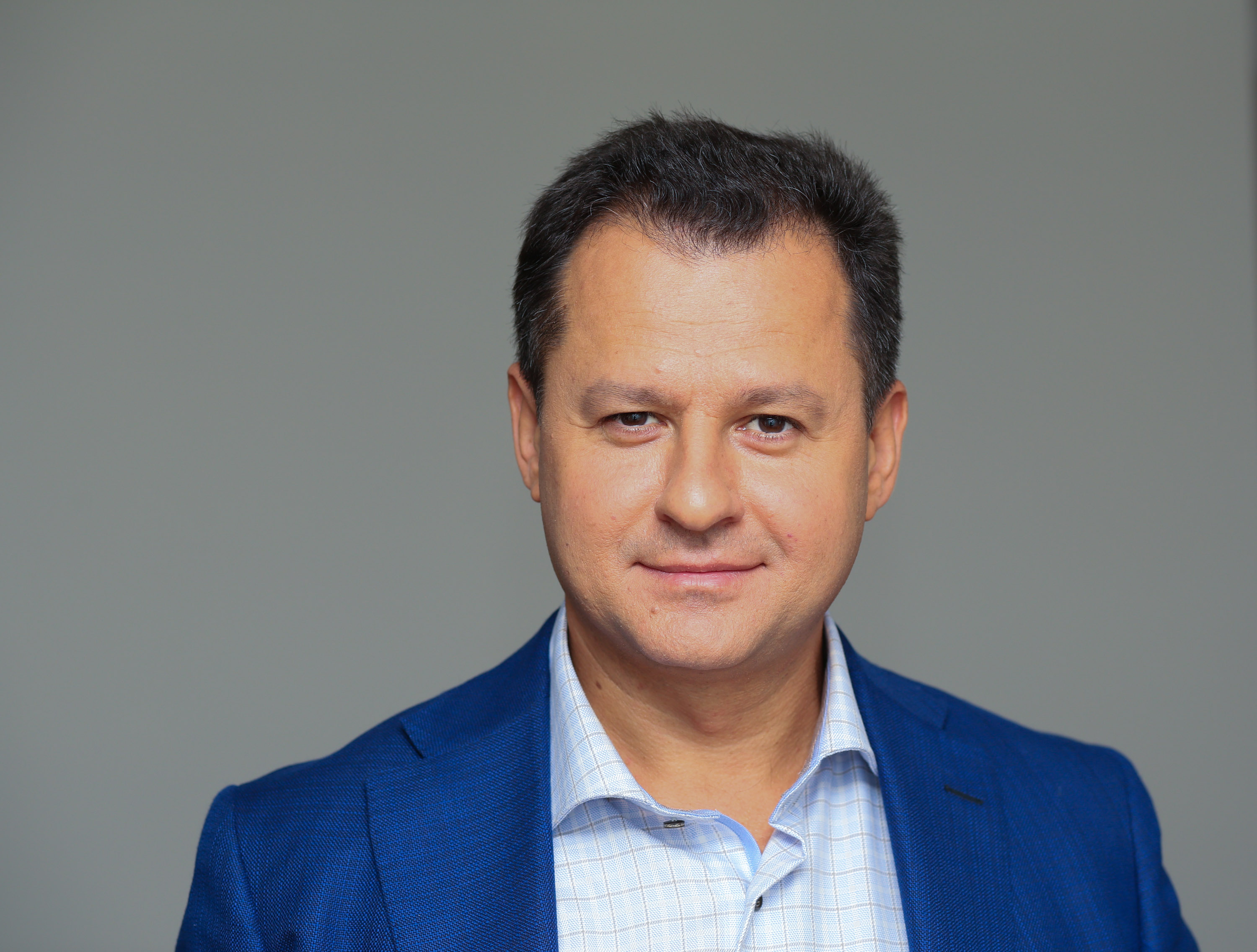
- Batenko in 2015

People's Deputy of Ukraine
- Incumbent
- Assumed office 27 November 2014
- Preceded by: Lidia Koteliak
- Constituency: Lviv Oblast, No. 123

Personal details
- Born: 20 June 1974 (age 52) Lviv, Ukrainian SSR, Soviet Union (now Ukraine)
- Party: Independent
- Other political affiliations: Republican Platform (from 1990); NUNS; UNP; UKROP (2016–2019); Petro Poroshenko Bloc (2014–2015); ZM (since 2019)
- Education: University of Lviv

Taras Ivanovych Batenko (Ukrainian: Тар́ас Іва́нович Б́атенко; born 20 June 1974) is a Ukrainian politician and historian, currently serving as a People's Deputy of Ukraine from Ukraine's 123rd electoral district since 27 November 2014.

== Early life and career ==
Taras Ivanovych Batenko was born on 20 June 1974 in the city of Lviv. From 1990, Batenko was a member of the Ukrainian Republican Party, additionally editing the party's journal, The Republican, from 1993 to 1996. The same year, he graduated from University of Lviv with a degree in political science. In 1999, he defended his thesis, "The Role of the Opposition Leader in the Public and Political Process of Ukraine in the Second Half of the 20th Century".

From 1996 to 1997, Batenko worked in the Lviv Oblast State Administration as an informational and analytical specialist. Afterwards, he shifted into political research, where he remained until he rejoined the Lviv Oblast State Administration as head of its press service. Batenko was also the head of Viktor Yushchenko's 2004 presidential campaign in Lviv Oblast before returning to the Lviv Oblast State Administration in 2005, this time as deputy head of political and legal issues.

Batenko became a member of the Lviv Oblast Council in 2006 as a member of Our Ukraine–People's Self-Defense Bloc, and was subsequently re-elected in 2010 as a member of Ukrainian People's Party. From 2009 to 2014, he was also director the important Druzhba pipeline.

== People's Deputy of Ukraine ==
Batenko first ran to be a People's Deputy of Ukraine in the 2012 Ukrainian parliamentary election, running in Ukraine's 123rd electoral district as an independent. Batenko was noted as a candidate by Ukrainska Pravda, but described as "not particularly noticeable." He ultimately failed to be elected, placing second behind Lidia Koteliak with 23.52% of the vote to Koteliak's 30.12%.

Batenko was a supporter of Euromaidan, saying, "Students today have become an expression of democratic attitudes and civic consciousness of the Ukrainian nation," and comparing it to the previous Revolution on Granite and Orange Revolution, as well as the Velvet Revolution in Czechoslovakia.

In the 2014 Ukrainian parliamentary election, Batenko again ran as a People's Deputy in 123rd electoral district, this time as a member of the Petro Poroshenko Bloc. This time he was successful, garnering 50.89% of the vote. Following his election, he became a member of the Verkhovna Rada Committee on the Fuel-Energy Complex, Nuclear Policy, and Nuclear Safety. Batenko defected from the Petro Poroshenko Bloc on 6 November 2015, and was elected as chairman of the political council of the UKROP party on 13 May 2016. In 2018, he was elected as head of the party.

In the 2019 Ukrainian parliamentary election, Batenko again ran as a People's Deputy, this time as an independent. He was once again successful, garnering 45.05% of the vote. In the Verkhovna Rada, he joined the For the Future faction, as well as the Committee of the Verkhovna Rada on issues of budget.

In August 2020, Batenko, alongside 46 other People's Deputies, submitted a petition to the Constitutional Court of Ukraine against a number of anti-corruption laws and parts of the criminal code, claiming the laws violated their constitutional rights. Batenko and the other People's Deputies were ultimately successful as the Constitutional Court blocked a system of electronic declarations from being enacted.

== Historical research ==
In addition to his political activities, Batenko is an active historian, having authored around 300 publications. His writings most often involve Ukrainian nationalism in the 19th and 20th centuries, Galicia, religion, and the imprisonment of Mykhailo Horyn, Bohdan Horyn, and Ivan Gel. He has also achieved notoriety for his studies of political figures throughout Ukraine and the Commonwealth of Independent States, including his sharply-critical biographies of Russian President Vladimir Putin.
