= Prydniprovska State Academy of Civil Engineering and Architecture =

Institution of higher education in Ukraine

- ННІ «Придніпровська державна академія будівництва та архітектури»
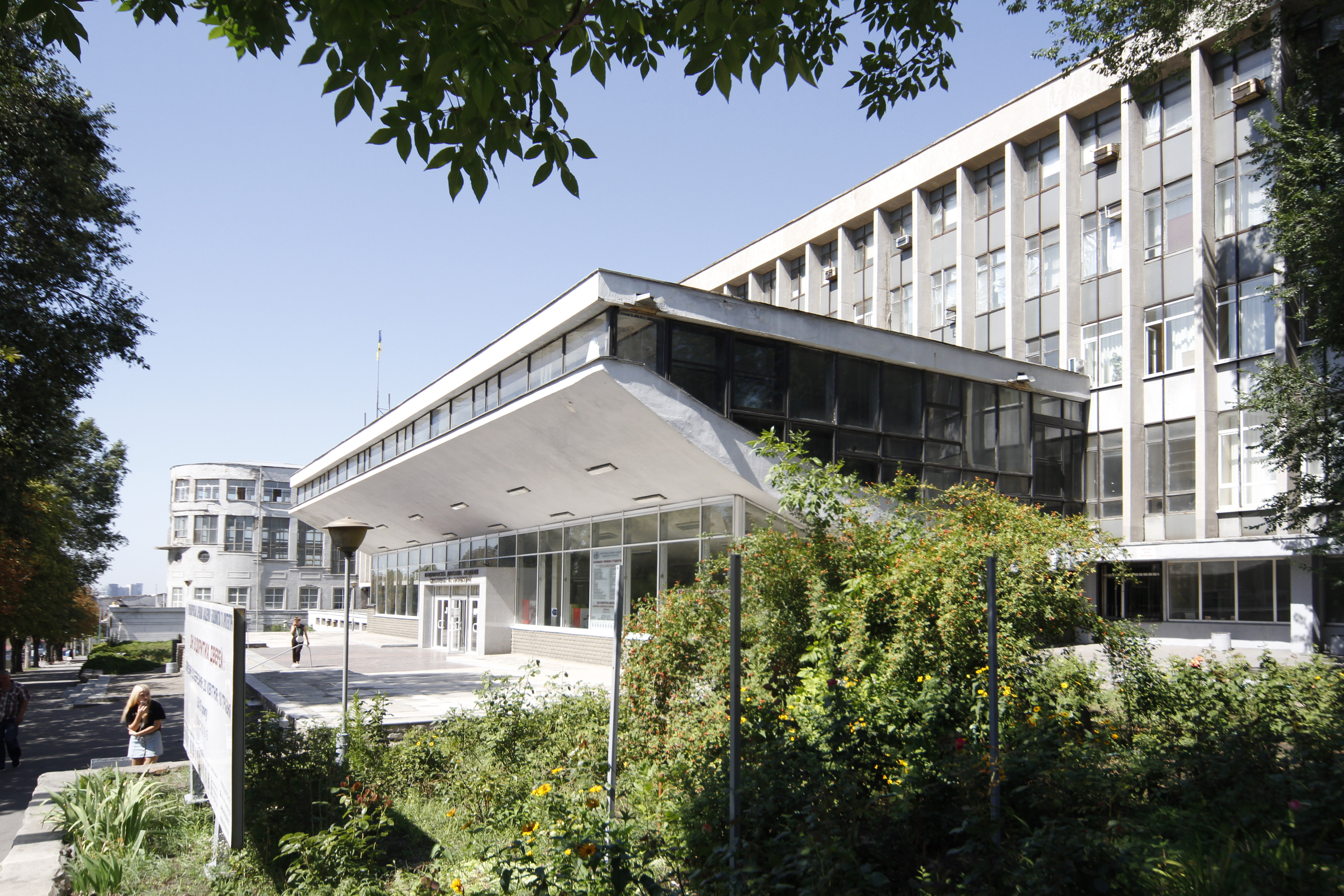
- Type: State-sponsored
- Established: 23 March 1930
- Affiliations: Ukrainian State University of Science and Technologies, Ministry of Education and Science of Ukraine
- Academic affiliations: IAU, АUF
- Rector: Prof. Mykola Savytskyi
- Administrative staff: 590
- Students: 9,000
- Location: Dnipro, Ukraine; 48°27′11.38″N 35°03′13.97″E
- Website: Official website

The Prydniprovska State Academy of Civil Engineering and Architecture (Ukrainian: Придніпровська державна академія будівництва та архітектури, romanized: Prydniprovska derzhavna akademiia budivnytstva ta arkhitektury, formerly known as abbr. DISI, Dnipropetrovsk Institute of Engineering and Construction) is one of the major academic institutions of higher education in Ukraine, specializing in engineering and architecture, located in Dnipro. Founded in 1930 as the "Dnipropetrovsk Institute of Civil Engineering", it currently has 7 faculties and 590 full-time faculty members (including 79 full professors and 266 associate professors). It is a member of several academic co-operations, including the IAU (1997) and АUF (2006). From 2021 part of Ukrainian State University of Science and Technologies as an institute of education and research.

== History ==
Although the PSACEA officially opened its doors in 1930, the history of what became the current institution reaches back further. In 1921, a College of Engineering was formed on the site and run by the government. In 1930 the college moved to its current location and was reorganized in Dnipropetrovsk Institute of Civil Engineering. Finally, it was given its current name in 1994. The campus is believed to be the location of the Krestovozdvijensky cathedral site.

== Overview ==
Serving approximately 9,000 students primarily from the greater Dnipropetrovsk Oblast area, PSACEA has more than 55,000 alumni. The Prydniprovska State Academy of Civil Engineering and Architecture operates year-round on the semesters system. Two semesters, each 22 weeks in duration.

Today, the campus of the PSACEA consists of 3 buildings, which are connected by hallways. The area includes a library with four reading halls and twelve computing centres. It also holds an indoor swimming complex, weight-training facilities, a gymnastics practice facility, a shooting-gallery, fencing rooms and a sports camp. sports grounds which includes indoors swimming-pool, seven gymnasiums, shooting-gallery and sports camp. The Gymnasium can hold about 4,000 people for the home basketball, indoor soccer, women's gymnastics and volleyball events. Students housing is available in eight dormitories, which offer catering services, recreational facilities and other amenities. There are a variety of group fitness programs at PSACEA. These programs are open to students, faculty, staff, and community members.

== Faculties ==
The Prydniprovska State Academy of Civil Engineering and Architecture offers the following graduate programs (sorted by faculty) All programs lead to BSc and MSc

Faculty of Civil & Industrial Engineering

- Civil Engineering

Faculty of Architecture

- Architectural engineering
- Environmental design
- Urban Planning

Faculty of Mechanics

- Automotive engineering
- Mechatronics
- Heavy equipment

Faculty of Economics

- International economy
- Finance
- Management
- Accounting and Auditing
- Corporate finance

Faculty of Construction

- Materials science
- Transport engineering
- Fluid mechanics
- Soil science
- Fluid mechanics

Faculty of Ecology and Environmental engineering

- Ecology and Environmental engineering
- Fluid dynamics
- Aerodynamics

Safety engineering

== Degree program ==
With combination of knowledge and experience in higher education and research the Prydniprovska State Academy of Civil Engineering and Architecture aims to train specialists (BSc, MSc and PhD).

=== Bachelor's degree programmes ===
The Bachelor phase starts each year in September and lasts four years and successful completion of a Bachelor's program results in a BSc or BA degree.

=== Master's degree programmes ===
Program usually takes one year. Successful completion of a master's program is awarded with a master's degree, MSc.

=== PhD degree programmes ===
Most departments, research institutes and faculties offer doctorate programs or positions, leading to a PhD degree. PhD programs last between three and four years. The results of the research are written down in a PhD thesis, often including papers published in scientific journals.

== International relations ==
For some Bachelor's and Master's programmes in Mechanics and Economics the language of instruction is English. Programmes taught in French leading to bachelor's and master's degrees are offered at Civil Engineering and Architecture. Scientific and student exchanges are being realizing with nine foreign universities from France, Canada, China, Croatia, Poland, Slovakia, North Macedonia, and Belgium. Every year over 30 students and post-graduate students are sent abroad to study there.

== Library ==
The library is the main resource for recorded knowledge and information supporting the teaching, research, and service functions of Prydniprovska State Academy of Civil Engineering and Architecture. Because of its size and depth, it is an important community and regional resource and a key part of institution's role as a regional university. The library currently holds over 525,770 volumes, as well as having approximately 43,406 current subscriptions to print periodicals.

== Student media ==
The "Young Engineer" is a student paper that used to publish twice a month.

== Notable alumni and faculty ==
- Oleksandr Garmash (1890-1940) – Ukrainian Soviet scientist
- Ivan Kulichenko – Mayor of Dnipro (1999-2014)
- Valeriy Pustovoitenko – Prime Minister of Ukraine (1997–99)

== See also ==
- Dnipro
- Ukraine
- Education in Ukraine
- List of universities in Ukraine
