= Ivan Kulichenko =

Ukrainian politician

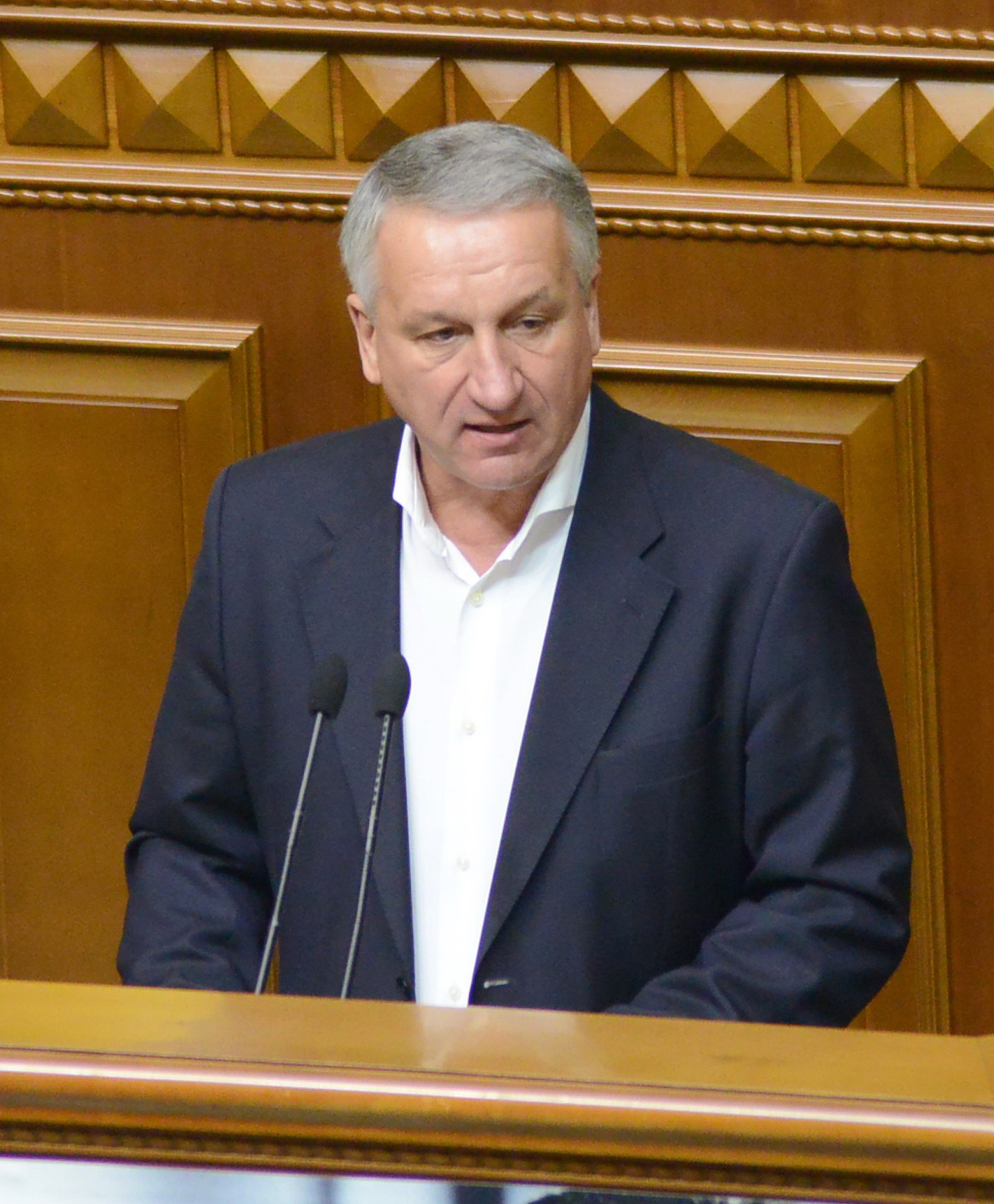
Kulichenko in 2015

Ivan Ivanovych Kulichenko (Ukrainian: Іван Іванович Куліченко; born 7 July 1955) is a Ukrainian politician who was from 2014 until 2019 People's Deputy of Ukraine; prior to this, he was Mayor of Dnipropetrovsk (Note: Current Dnipro. On 19 May 2016 the Ukrainian parliament passed a bill to officially rename the city of Dnipropetrovsk to Dnipro. The city had to be renamed since (in 1926) the city was renamed after Communist leader Grigory Petrovsky and the 2015 law on decommunization has outlawed the use of Communist names and symbols (in Ukraine).) for 15 years.

== Biography ==
In 1977 Kulichenko graduated from the Dnipropetrovsk Institute of Civil Engineering. In 1979, after his conscription in the Armed Forces of the USSR, he became a civil servant in the urban planning department of the Dnipropetrovsk Oblast. In 1986 Kulichenko was appointed Deputy Chairman of the Planning Commission of the Dnipropetrovsk City Council. Four years later he was appointed Deputy Chairman of the Executive Committee of Dnipropetrovsk. Kulichenko became the First Deputy Mayor of Dnipropetrovsk (city) in 1994. In 1999 Kulichenko became acting Mayor of Dnipropetrovsk. After that he was (re-)elected mayor four times, in 2000, in 2002, in 2006 and in 2010. In 2010 he was re-elected with 40,1% as a candidate of Party of Regions. His nearest opponent, Svyatoslav Oliynyk of Ukraine of the Future, received 16.1%. On 22 February 2014 Kulichenko left Party of Regions "for peace in the city". Earlier that day, locals, while picketing the city council, had demanded his departure of Party of Regions. 22 February 2014 was also the day that Ukrainian President Viktor Yanukovych and the Party of Region-led Second Azarov Government were ousted out of office, after the months long Euromaidan-demonstrations had accumulated into the 2014 Euromaidan regional state administration occupations and deadly violence in Kyiv.

In the 2014 parliamentary election Kulichenko won a seat in constituency number 28 situated in Dnipropetrovsk as a candidate of Petro Poroshenko Bloc with 33.5% of the votes. He resigned as mayor on 21 November 2014.

Kulichenko was not re-elected in the 2019 Ukrainian parliamentary election, as an independent candidate he failed this time to win a seat in constituency number 28. This time 13.49% of the voters of the constituency voted for him.
