= National Metallurgical Academy of Ukraine =

Public university in Dnipro, Ukraine

- ННІ «Національна металургійна академія України»
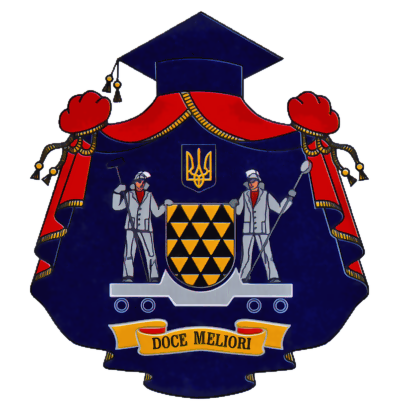
- Motto: Doce Meliori
- Motto in English: Teach Better
- Type: Public university
- Established: 1899
- Affiliations: Ukrainian State University of Science and Technologies, Ministry of Education and Science of Ukraine
- Rector: Olexandr Velychko
- Students: ~15,000
- Location: Dnipro, Ukraine
- Campus: Urban
- Website: www.nmetau.edu.ua

The National Metallurgical Academy of Ukraine (Ukrainian: Національна металургійна академія України, romanized: Natsionalna metalurhiina akademiia Ukrainy), formerly known as the Dnipropetrovsk Metallurgical Institute (DMetI), is a state-sponsored university in Dnipro dedicated to the study of metallurgy. From 2021 part of Ukrainian State University of Science and Technologies (in Dnipro) as an institute of studies and research.

== History ==
National Metallurgical Academy of Ukraine is the oldest higher metallurgical educational institution of Ukraine. It was founded as a factory department of the Ekaternoslav Higher Mining School in October 1899. In 1912, the department was transformed into the metallurgical faculty of the Mining Institute, which later became the Dnipro Metallurgical Institute in 1930. In 1993, the Resolution of the Cabinet of Ministers of Ukraine granted the Institute the status of a state university. In 1999, the Decree of the President of Ukraine granted it the status of the National Academy.

== Academics ==
There are 13 schools focusing on various scientific disciplines in the academy. Some examples of subjects studied are iron and steel metallurgy, thermal engineering, metallurgical equipment, and metalworking.

The academy is a part of many international programs, such as Erasmus, TEMPUS, and DAAD. The academy also participates in the Bologna Process.

== Schools ==
- Faculty of Humanities
- Faculty of Metallurgy
- Faculty of Mechanical Engineering
- Special faculty of retraining of specialists
- Faculty of continuous education
- Faculty of Computer Systems, Energy and Automation
- Faculty of Materials Science and Metalworking
- Faculty of advanced training of teachers and specialists
- Faculty of Economics and Management
- Faculty of Electrometallurgy
- Nikopol Technical School of NMetAU

== Rankings ==
NMetAU has a high ranking among Ukrainian universities, often placed in the top 20 or top 10 schools.

Rating of Ukraine universities III, IV accreditation levels "Top 200" Ukraine

- 2009 – 18th place
- 2010 – 16th place
- 2011 – 17th place

Rating of Ukraine universities in Ukraine "Compass 2012"

- 2010 – 7th place
- 2011 – 7th place
- 2012 – 7th place

The national system of ranking evaluation of higher education institutions: Technical universities 2012 – 8th place

== Notable alumni ==
- Ihor Kolomoyskyi, Ukrainian billionaire, business oligarch, one of the founders of the Privat Group.
- Yury Mukhin, Soviet engineer, inventor and the top manager of the metallurgical industry.
- Victor Pinchuk, Ukrainian businessman and oligarch.
- Serhiy Tihipko, Ukrainian politician and finance specialist
- Oleksandr Turchynov, Ukrainian politician, former acting President of Ukraine (2014) and Secretary of the National Security and Defence Council of Ukraine.
- Andriy Khvetkevych, Ukrainian and American world-class freediver.

== See also ==
- List of universities in Ukraine
