= Oleksandr Garmash =

Ukrainian and Soviet scientist

Oleksandr Harmash
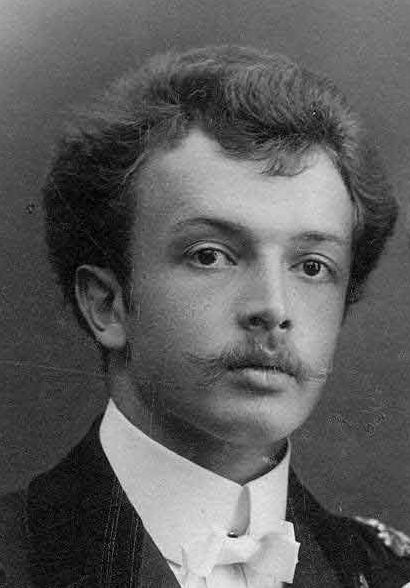
- Born: 1890
- Died: 1940 (aged 49–50); Dnipropetrovsk, USSR
- Citizenship: Ukrainian People's Republic; Ukrainian SSR; USSR
- Education: Kyiv Polytechnic Institute
- Scientific career
- Fields: Construction management and construction engineering
- Workplaces: Dnipropetrovsk Building Institute

Oleksandr Andriyovych Harmash (Garmash) (1890–June 1940) (Ukrainian: Олександр Андрійович Гармаш) - was a Ukrainian and Soviet scientist in the field of production line methods in construction (construction engineering), professor of the Dnipropetrovsk Building Institute.

O. Harmash ... laid the basis for the industrialization of building in Ukraine.
Ukrainian Soviet Encyclopedia. — P. 451

== Life and work ==
Having graduated from the Kyiv Polytechnic Institute in 1916, Oleksandr Garmash worked on major construction projects of the USSR. He designs and supervises over construction of 15 multiple-arch and concrete bridges in the Ukrainian SSR, including regions of the Dnipropetrovsk oblast, works in special board on locking the Dnieper river. Under his projects and supervision there were built the arch and concrete bridge in the Hloba park, buildings of the sewing and shoe factories in Dnipropetrovsk. He contributed to the creation of the industrial base of the Dnieper Hydroelectric Station and organization of industrial construction of the Dneprostal enterprise.

He worked as a teacher in the Katerynoslavska Building Technical Evening School, since 1930 - in Dnipropetrovsk Building Institute on positions of the deputy director on educational and research work, chief of the chairs of organization of construction works, and construction operations. From 1932 – he is a member of editorial board of the editorial-publishing house «State Building Technical Publishing». He works as research supervisor of the scientific and research sector of the Institute. In 1937-1938 he acted as director of the Institute, later – worked as deputy director of the Institute.

Prof. O.A. Harmash worked in the field of production line methods in construction. His research was focused, among other things, on liquidation of seasonality in construction activities: in 1931 he publishes his book «Construction activities in winter», in 1933 he begins his experimental work on electric heating of concrete. Materials and results of these research projects were presented in his book «Electric heating of concrete». Another important contribution to the line production methods in construction was his work «Organization and mechanization of transport in civil construction work» (1934). In his dissertation «Blast-furnace slags and their rational use» he had for the first time grounded the theory of production line methods in construction. O.A. Harmash had suggested for the first time a theoretical justification for the calculation and design of construction process with the help of mathematical methods (1939).

== Publications ==
He is the author of the following works:

- А. А. Garmash. Construction work. — Part I.: Concreting in frost. — 1931.
- А. А. Garmash. Organization and mechanization of transport in civil construction work. — 1934.
- А. А. Garmash. Theory of construction process. — 1939.
