= Pylyp Harmash =

Ukrainian volleyball player (born 1989)

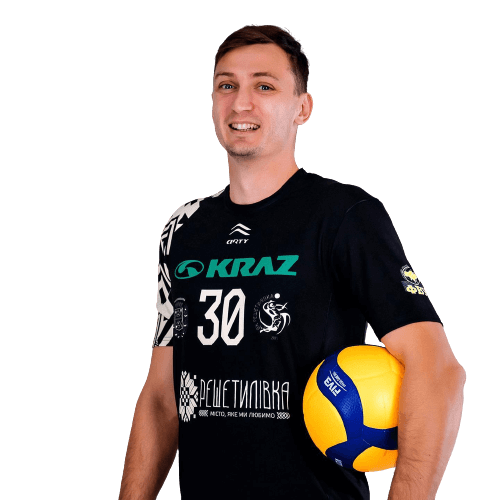

Personal information
- Nationality: Ukrainian
- Born: April 21, 1989 (age 37); Poltava, Ukraine
- Height: 6 ft 3 in (1.91 m)
- Weight: 190 lb (86 kg)
- Spike: 120 in (305 cm)
- Block: 112 in (285 cm)

Volleyball information
- Position: Libero
- Current club: (Ukraine) VC Yurydychna Akademiya Kharkiv

Career
Years	Teams
2010–2017; 2017–2018; 2018–2019; 2019–2020; 2020-2021; 2021-present	(Ukraine) Lokomotyv Kharkiv (Romania) Volei Municipal Zalău (Ukraine) MHP-Vinnytsia (Romania) Știința Explorări Baia Mare (Ukraine) Lokomotyv Kharkiv (Ukraine) Yurydychna Akademiya Kharkiv

National team
Ukraine
Medal record
Representing Ukraine
Summer Universiade
Silver medal – second place	2015 Gwangju	Team

Pylyp Mykolaiovych Harmash (Ukrainian: Пилип Миколайович Гармаш; born April 21, 1989) is a professional Ukrainian volleyball player of the Lokomotyv Kharkiv in Ukrainian Super League. Harmash was previously a member of the Ukraine men's national volleyball team.

== Career ==
In 2020 Harmash returned to the Lokomotyv Kharkiv.

== Sporting achievements ==
=== Clubs ===
Ukrainian Championship:

- 2010/11, 2011/12, 2012/13, 2013/14, 2014/15, 2015/16, 2016/17

Ukrainian Cup:

- 2010/11, 2011/12, 2012/13, 2013/14, 2014/15, 2015/16

=== Individual ===
- 2013/2014 Best libero (Ukraine) Ukrainian Super League
- 2016/2017 Best libero (Ukraine) Ukrainian Supercup
