= Dnipro Institute of Infrastructure and Transport =

University in Dnipro, Ukraine

Coordinates: 48.434°N 35.048°E

Dnipro Institute of Infrastructure and Transport named after academician V. Lazaryan, DIIT
- ННІ "Дніпровський інститут інфраструктури та транспорту ім. ак. В. Лазаряна"
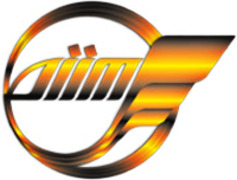
- Former names: Institute of Engineers of Railway Transport (1930-1993); Dnipropetrovsk State Technical University of Railway Transport (1993-2000); Dnipropetrovsk National University of Railway Transport (2000-2021)
- Type: National
- Established: 1930 as Institute of Engineers of Railway Transport; 1993 as Dnipropetrovsk State Technical University of Railway Transport; 2000 as Dnipropetrovsk National University of Railway Transport
- Affiliations: Ukrainian State University of Science and Technologies, Ministry of Education and Science of Ukraine
- Rector: Prof. O.M. Pshinko
- Students: ca. 10000
- Location: Dnipro, Ukraine
- Website: www.diit.edu.ua

The Dnipro Institute of Infrastructure and Transport named after academician V. Lazaryan (abbr. DIIT, Ukrainian: Навчально-науковий іститут "Дніпровський інститут інфраструктури та транспорту імені академіка В.Лазаряна", abbr. ДІІТ ім.Лазаряна, romanized: Navchalno-naukovyi istytut "Dniprovskyi instytut infrastruktury ta transportu imeni akademika V.Lazariana", previously Dnipropetrovsk University) is a higher educational institution of the 4th (maximum) level of state accreditation in Ukraine. From 2021 part of Ukrainian State University of Science and Technologies (in Dnipro) as an institute of studies and research. It was founded in 1930 as the Institute of Railway Transport Engineers, and until 2021 known as the Dnipro National University of Rail Transport.

== Structure ==
The structure of the University comprises 11 departments:

- Bridges and Transport Tunnels
- Electrification of Railway Transport
- Mechanical Engineering
- Railway Traffic Control
- Railway Track Construction and Maintenance
- Civil and Industrial Engineering
- Economics and Management in Transport
- Technical Cybernetics
- Humanities and work with foreign students
- Extra-Mural Training of Specialists and Up-grading Qualification Department

== See also ==
- Open access in Ukraine
- List of universities in Ukraine
