= Tatiana Garmash-Roffe =

Russian detective novelist

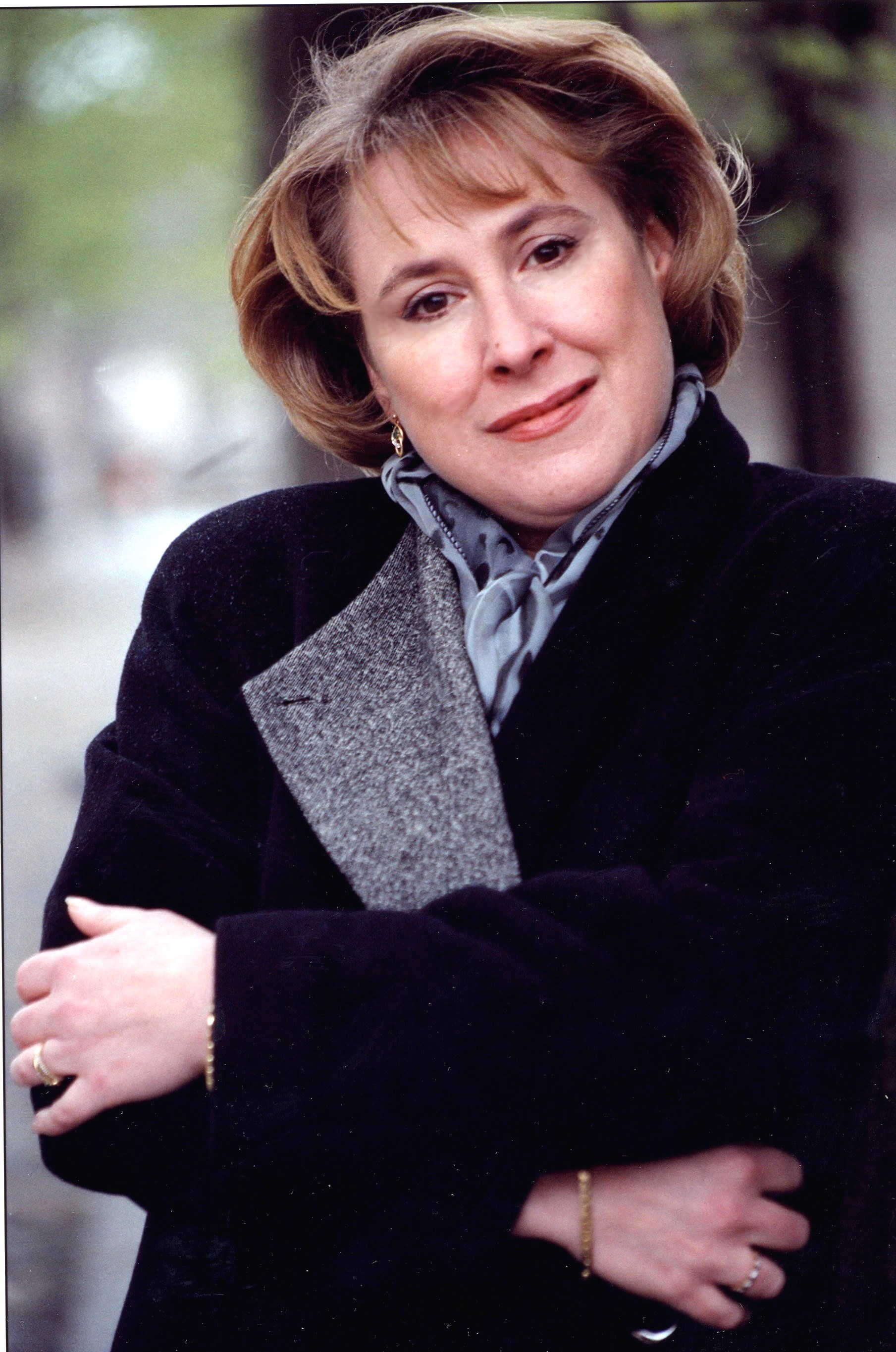
Tatiana Garmash-Roffe

Tatiana Garmash-Roffe (Russian: Татьяна Гармаш-Роффе; née Татьяна Владимировна Гармаш) born November 4, 1959 in Moscow, Russia, is an author of detective stories, who also published under the pseudonym "Tatiana Svetlova".

== Life and work ==
Tatiana Garmash-Roffe graduated from the Department of Philology of the Moscow State University. After graduation she was teaching Russian for foreign students at the Peoples' Friendship University of Russia. She also had worked as a journalist and written theater reviews for the theatrical magazines.

In 1994, she married French national Claude Roffe and relocated to France with her two children from a previous marriage. Soon after that she wrote her first novel Naked Queen which was published in 1995 under the title Love without Memory by a Moscow publishing house "Izdatelstvo Rusanova." In 1998 a large Moscow publisher EKSMO published under the pseudonym Tatiana Svetlova her second novel The Mystery Of My Reflection, soon followed by other novels.

Beginning in 2006, EKSMO commenced publishing her new novels under her real name in the series titled The Detective of the Highest Standard. Over the following two years, EKSMO reissued her previously published novels under the pseudonym Tatiana Svetlova within the same series.

Garmash-Roffe’s novels are distinguished by an elegant literary style, meticulously detailed settings, daring imagination, and strong emphasis on deduction work by her major character, a Moscow private detective Alexei Kisanov. She does scrupulous research on her books, paying much attention to the details of the real world of crime and investigations. Her novels are known for their taut atmosphere and strong psychological suspense, along with the fast changing pace of her storytelling.

== Bibliography ==
=== Major works ===
1. The Mystery of My Reflection (1998)
2. Versace Style Blackmail (1999)
3. Private Visit to Paris (Place of Death Can’t be Changed) (2000)
4. The Naked Queen (2000)
5. Pranks of the Evil Force (2001)
6. A Witch for the Inquisitor (2002)
7. The Role of a Sinner for an Encore (2003)
8. Everlasting Youth for Auction (2004)
9. Guardian Bodyguard Angel (2004)
10. The Royal Weed (2005)
11. The Dead Waters of the Moscow Sea (2006)
12. If I Survive (2006)
13. The Thirteen Ways to Hate (2007)
14. To Leave Impossible to Stay (2008)
15. The Broken World (2008)
16. Black lace, scarlet sunset (2009)
17. Berries of passion, berries of death (2010)
18. The second guiding star (2010)

=== Short stories ===
1. The Miracle for Nina (In The Best Detective Stories) (2007)
2. The Snowman (in The Golden Book of Detectives) (2008)
