= Andriy Yermolenko =

Ukrainian political activist and artist (born 1974)

- Андрій Єрмоленко
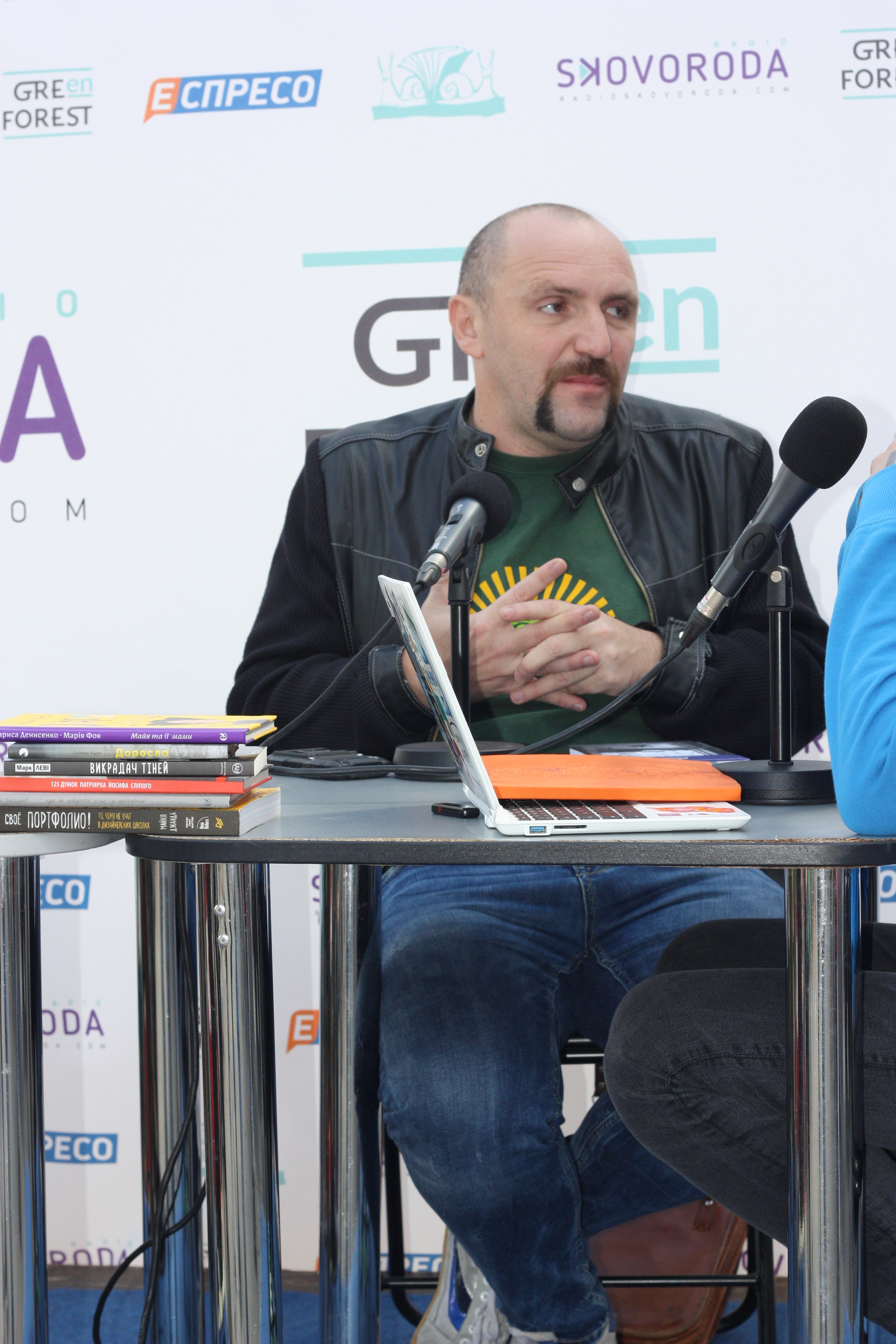
- Yermolenko in 2017
- Born: Andriy Ivanovich Yermolenko; 24 January 1974 (age 52); Kyiv, Ukrainian SSR, Soviet Union
- Education: Taras Shevchenko National University of Kyiv
- Occupations: Artist; designer; illustrator; political activist
- Awards: Shevchenko National Prize

Andriy Ivanovich Yermolenko (Ukrainian: Андрій Іванович Єрмоленко; born 24 January 1974) is a Ukrainian artist, including designer and illustrator, who is the art director of The Ukrainian Week magazine.

He is known in Ukraine for creating the "United Colours of Ukraine" unofficial logos for the country's biggest towns and stamps for hundreds of Euromaidan and ATO soldiers.

== Early life and education ==
Andriy Yermolenko was born on 24 January 1974 and grew up in Kyiv in a family of scientists. He began drawing at the age of three, creating his first artwork—a dog with sausage-shaped paws—and started painting more seriously by the time he was five. From an early age, he admired Taras Shevchenko and was deeply inspired by his grandmother's stories about Nestor Makhno, whom she had personally known. Yermolenko completed his secondary education in 1991 at school No. 200 in Kyiv and later earned a degree in chemistry from Taras Shevchenko National University of Kyiv.

== Career ==
After graduating from university, Yermolenko initially worked in his field of study, chemistry. He later described teaching as one of the most interesting professions in the world and enjoyed his time in the role. However, he eventually left the profession due to low income.

As his passion for drawing began to generate more earnings, it shifted from a hobby into a full-time career. From 2000 to 2004, he served as the chief designer at Lucky.net, followed by positions as chief designer at Chas.ua magazine from 2004 to 2006, and at Profil magazine from 2006 to 2007. Since 2007, Yermolenko has held the role of art director at Ukrainian Week magazine.

Along with Olexa Mann and Ivan Semesyuk, Yermolenko became well-known as a member of a group of young, provocative painters from the unofficial Bakteria gallery. Using anarchist slogans and crude humor, they garnered recognition in 2013 for their sarcastic and unvarnished portrayals of marginalised urban life in Ukraine. They actively participated in the 2014 Maidan protests, whose spirit their work foreshadowed.

At the Khreshchatyk street protest site, Yermolenko assisted in the establishment of Mystetsky Barbakan, a temporary gallery and cultural center. Constructed using plywood and pallets, it served as a major hub for the creative youth of the revolution, hosting festivals, speeches, and exhibitions.

In 2014, a book about the Ukrainian hero Ivan Sila, nicknamed "Croton", was published for both adults and teenagers. The cover, featuring the protagonist Ivan Firtsak, was designed by Yermolenko, showcasing his distinct artistic style.

That same year, Yermolenko garnered widespread attention at the M17 Center of Contemporary Art with his poster designs for the First International Competition of Ukrainian Patriotic Posters. His works, which included provocative imagery such as a Molotov cocktail–wielding God and a sabre-armed Cossack, reflected his belief that posters should not merely respond to headlines but inspire thought and action.

On 23 February 2023, Yermolenko lent his artistic expertise to the 9 Years of Resistance exhibition in Kyiv, which focused on the occupation of Crimea and Ukraine's enduring struggle against Russian aggression.

Continuing his commitment to using art as a form of resistance, on 28 April 2025 he painted a mural on the ruins of a missile-destroyed school in Zarichne. This work, created as part of the Murals of Resistance project, symbolised Ukraine's defiance and its unwavering fight for freedom.

== Political positions ==
=== Russia and the 2018 FIFA World Cup ===
In 2018, Yermolenko gained international recognition for his controversial poster campaign against Russia's hosting of the FIFA World Cup. He created a series of posters that combined football imagery with explicit references to Russian military aggression, including the downing of flight MH17, the annexation of Crimea, and the conflict in Syria.

His posters, which were widely shared under the hashtag #BoycottWorldCup2018, aimed to raise awareness among English-speaking and European audiences, as well as Ukrainian citizens. Yermolenko, stating that he "couldn't be silent," explained that his goal was to challenge the idea that international sporting events should ignore the political actions of the host country.

Despite unsuccessful attempts to prohibit broadcasts of the World Cup, his initiative was supported by Ukrainian officials and activists, who helped spread the message and even sparked controversy in the Verkhovna Rada.

=== "Do Not Appease Evil" ===
In January 2025, Yermolenko joined over 160 public figures in signing an open appeal titled "Do Not Appease Evil". The appeal called on world leaders to reject any form of appeasement towards Russia, warning that Russia's war against Ukraine was part of a broader strategy to dismantle the global rules-based order. The signatories emphasised that only a decisive defeat of Russian President Vladimir Putin's government could ensure lasting peace and security for the world.

== Awards ==
- Shevchenko National Prize (2024)
