= Monuments of national significance in Dnipropetrovsk Oblast =

List of cultural heritage monuments of national significance in Dnipropetrovsk Oblast.

== Listings ==
No.	Photo	Name	Date	Location	Type	Protected number
1		Building of Dmytro Yavornytsky History Museum	1905	Dnipro, prospekt Karla Marksa, 16	monument of history	040001-N
2		Grave of historian, archaeologist, and ethnographer Dmytro Yavornytsky	1940	Dnipro, prospekt Karla Marksa, 16	monument of history	040002-N
3		House, in which lived and worked historian, archaeologist, and ethnographer Dmytro Yavornytsky	1st half of 20th century	Dnipro, Shevchenko Square, 5	monument of history	040003-N
4		New-Theotokos Fortress	1688-1711	Dnipro, vulytsia Novhorodska, park	monument of history	040004-N
5		Kurgan burial	3rd-1st millennium BCE	Apostolove Raion, village Zaporizke (outside west at cemetery)	monument of archaeology	040005-N
6		Kurgan burial	3rd-1st millennium BCE	Apostolove Raion, village Slovianka (outside east from northern edge)	monument of archaeology	040006-N
7		Kodak Fortress	1635-1711	Dnipro Raion, village Stari Kodaky	monument of history	040007-N
8		Kurgan burial	3rd-1st millennium BCE	Kryvyi Rih Raion, village Veselyi Kut (outside south-west)	monument of archaeology	040008-N
9		Kurgan burial "Old Female Grave"	3rd-1st millennium BCE	Kryvyi Rih Raion, village Kamiane Pole (outside south-east)	monument of archaeology	040009-N
10		Grave of Kosh Otaman Ivan Sirko	1680 (relocated in 1967)	Nikopol Raion, village Kapulivka (outside north)	monument of history	040010-N
11		Kurgan "Nechayev-Hehelyna Grave"	mid 1st millennium BCE	Nikopol Raion, village Lebedynske (outside north-east)	monument of archaeology	040011-N
12		Kurgan "Orlov Grave"	mid 1st millennium BCE	Nikopol Raion, village Lebedynske (south-east)	monument of archaeology	040012-N
13		Kurgan	3rd-1st millennium BCE	Petrykivka Raion, village Loboikivka (near Tsari-Kamyshi lake)	monument of archaeology	040013-N
14		Hillfort	2nd-4th millennium CE	Solone Raion, village Bashmachka (Bashmachka gully)	monument of archaeology	040014-N
15		Kurgan	3rd-1st millennium BCE	Solone Raion, village Bezborodkove	monument of archaeology	040015-N
16		Place where perished the Kyiv Prince Sviatoslav I	945-972	Solone Raion, village Mykilske-na-Dnipri	monument of history	040016-N
17		Kurgan burial "Chekerezka Grave"	3rd-1st millennium BCE	Solone Raion, village Tomakivka (outside south-east)	monument of archaeology	040017-N
18		Kurgan burial	3rd-1st millennium BCE	Sofiivka Raion, village Marivka (north-west from Makortivske Reservoir)	monument of archaeology	040018-N
19		Kurgan burial	3rd-1st millennium BCE	Sofiivka Raion, village Petropavlivka (3.5 km east from south-east edge)	monument of archaeology	040019-N
20		Structures of the Ukrainian fortification line – bastions (2) and field fortifications between them	start of 18th century	Tsarychanka Raion, village Zalelia (outside north-west)	monument of history	040020-N
21		Structures of the Ukrainian fortification line – earthen rampart fortifications (redoubts)	start of 18th century	Tsarychanka Raion, village Mohyliv, vulytsia Berehova, cemetery	monument of history	040021-N
22		Structures of the Ukrainian fortification line – earthen rampart fortifications	start of 18th century	Tsarychanka Raion, village Tarasivka (outside east)	monument of history	040022-N
23		Kurgan	3rd-1st millennium BCE	Shyroke Raion, village Radevycheve (outside north-east from center)	monument of archaeology	040023-N
