= House–museum of Dmytro Yavornytsky =

Museum in Dnipro, Ukraine

- Будинок-музей Дмитра Яворницького
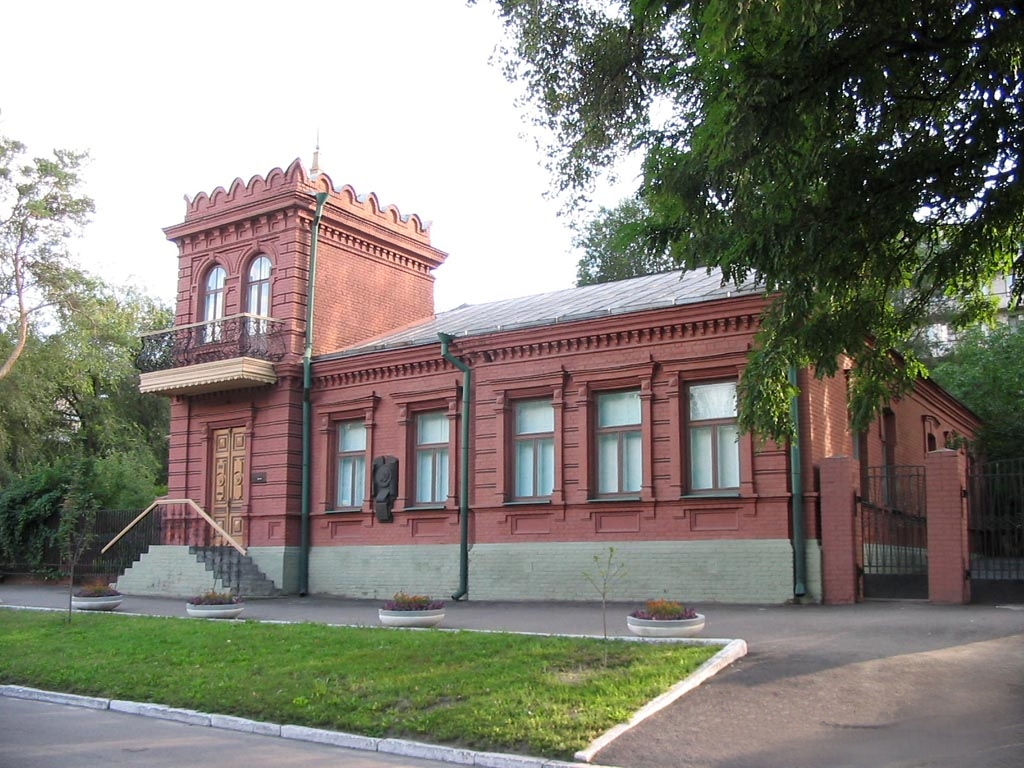
- The museum in 2006
- Established: 3 November 1988
- Location: 5 Taras Shevchenko Square, Dnipro, Ukraine
- Coordinates: 48°27′38″N 35°04′07″E
- Type: Historic house
- Accreditation: Dmytro Yavornytsky National Historical Museum of Dnipro
- Director: Tymoshenko Petrovna
- Architect: Leonid Brodnytsky
- Website: museum.dp.ua

Immovable Monument of National Significance of Ukraine
- Official name: Будинок, у якому жив і працював історик, археолог і етнограф Д. І. Яворницький (House where the historian, archaeologist and ethnographer D. I. Yavornytsky lived and worked)
- Type: History
- Reference no.: 040003-Н

The House–museum of Dmytro Yavornytsky (Ukrainian: Меморіальний будинок-музей Дмитра Яворницького, romanized: Memorialnyi budynok-muzei Dmytra Yavornytskoho) is an historic house museum of the academician Dmytro Yavornytsky in the city of Dnipro, Ukraine. The building is one of the Dmytro Yavornytsky National Historical Museum of Dnipro's collection. Additionally, it is the only historic Katerynoslav (present-day Dnipro) residential estate still standing.

== Design ==
The mezzanine, living room, dining room, study, foyer, and hall of Yavornytsky's home were all furnished exactly as they were when he lived there in the 1930s. Poplar and pine trees Yavornytsky planted, still stands in front of the home.

== History ==
In the present-day Taras Shevchenko Park, it was constructed in 1905 in accordance with the design of architect Leonid Brodnytsky across from the Potemkin Palace. For thirty-five years, Yavornytsky, a well-known Ukrainian archaeologist, historian, and public personality, lived and worked in this red brick home featuring a carved wooden veranda and a belvedere.

Yavornytskyi cleared new ground in every facet of Ukrainian culture throughout his lifetime. Following his passing, his second wife Serafima Dmitrivna wrote to the municipal executive committee requesting that a museum be established in his home. However, this was not feasible since the Second World War broke out, and the house was taken over by German occupiers

At the war's conclusion, the decision to establish a memorial museum was reiterated; yet, the home served as the historical museum's funding source up to the 1960s. The house was closed for repairs in the 1970s because it was in poor condition. In addition, the decision was made in 1982 to establish a Dmytro Ivanovych Evarnytsky memorial museum. 3 November 1988 marked the opening of the memorial house.

The museum hosts exhibits, concerts, scientific conferences, master seminars on ornamental and practical art, themed excursions, creative encounters with notable individuals from the city and Ukraine in general. Since 2007, the house has featured an exhibition area where guests may learn about themed displays pertaining to Yavornytsky's life and accomplishments.

On 17 July 2023, the museum offers an array of enriching master classes tailored for schoolchildren, covering a range of activities including embroidery, straw-weaving, Petrykivka painting, papercutting, penmanship, beadwork, and more. The master classes are available throughout the year. On 8 April, the National Museum-Preserve "Battle for Kyiv in 1943" hosted a sizable event to commemorate the anniversary of the territory's liberation at the house, with several items from the Russian Invasion of Ukraine, including Battle of Irpin, was among the event exhibitions.

== Collections ==
Numerous memorabilia are on display at the show, including student notebooks from his time spent studying in the Kharkiv gymnasium, workbooks that included his personal belongings, papers, letters, photos, and paintings. Among personal items are spectacles, a stick, an embroidered blouse, and many more.

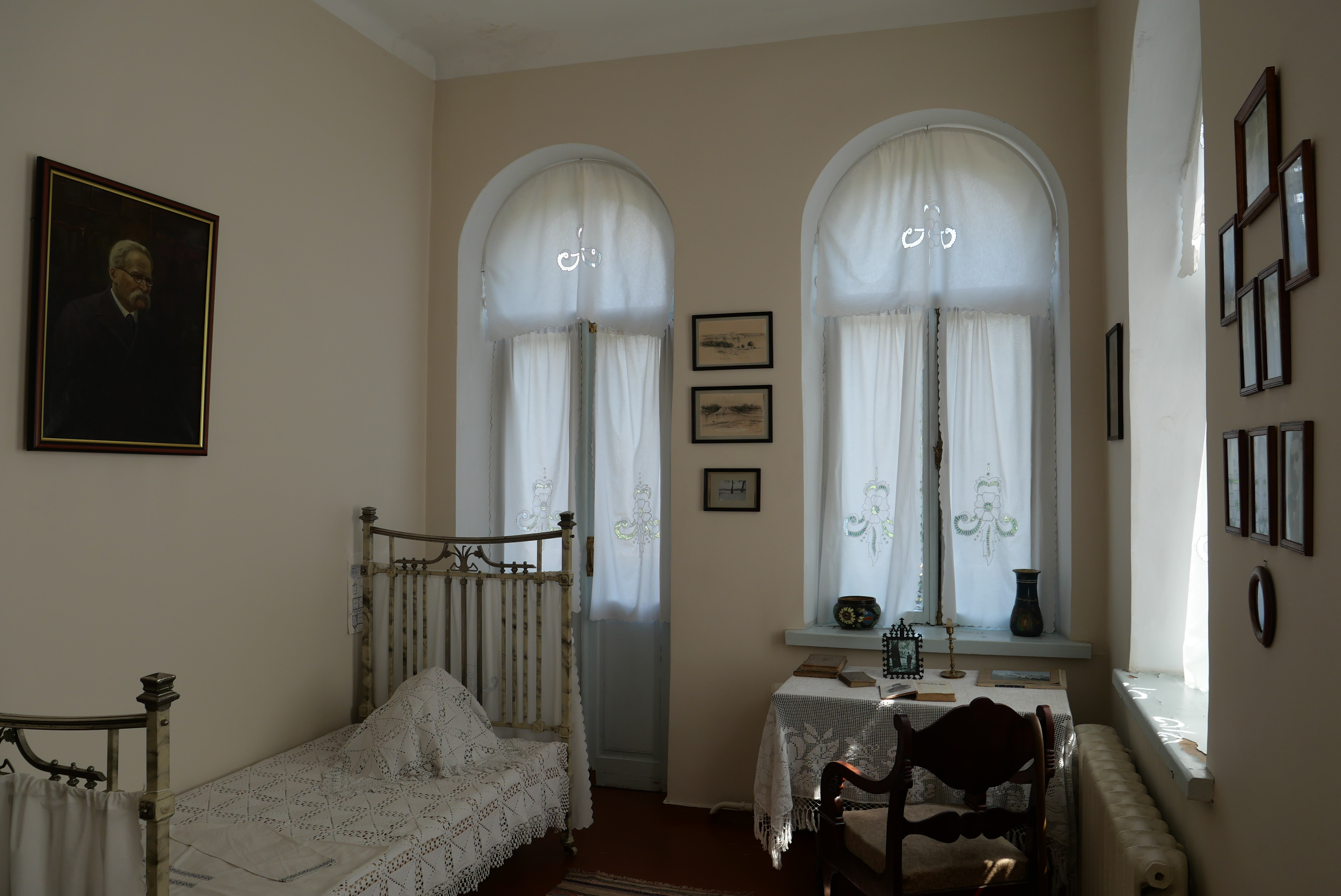
Mezzanine

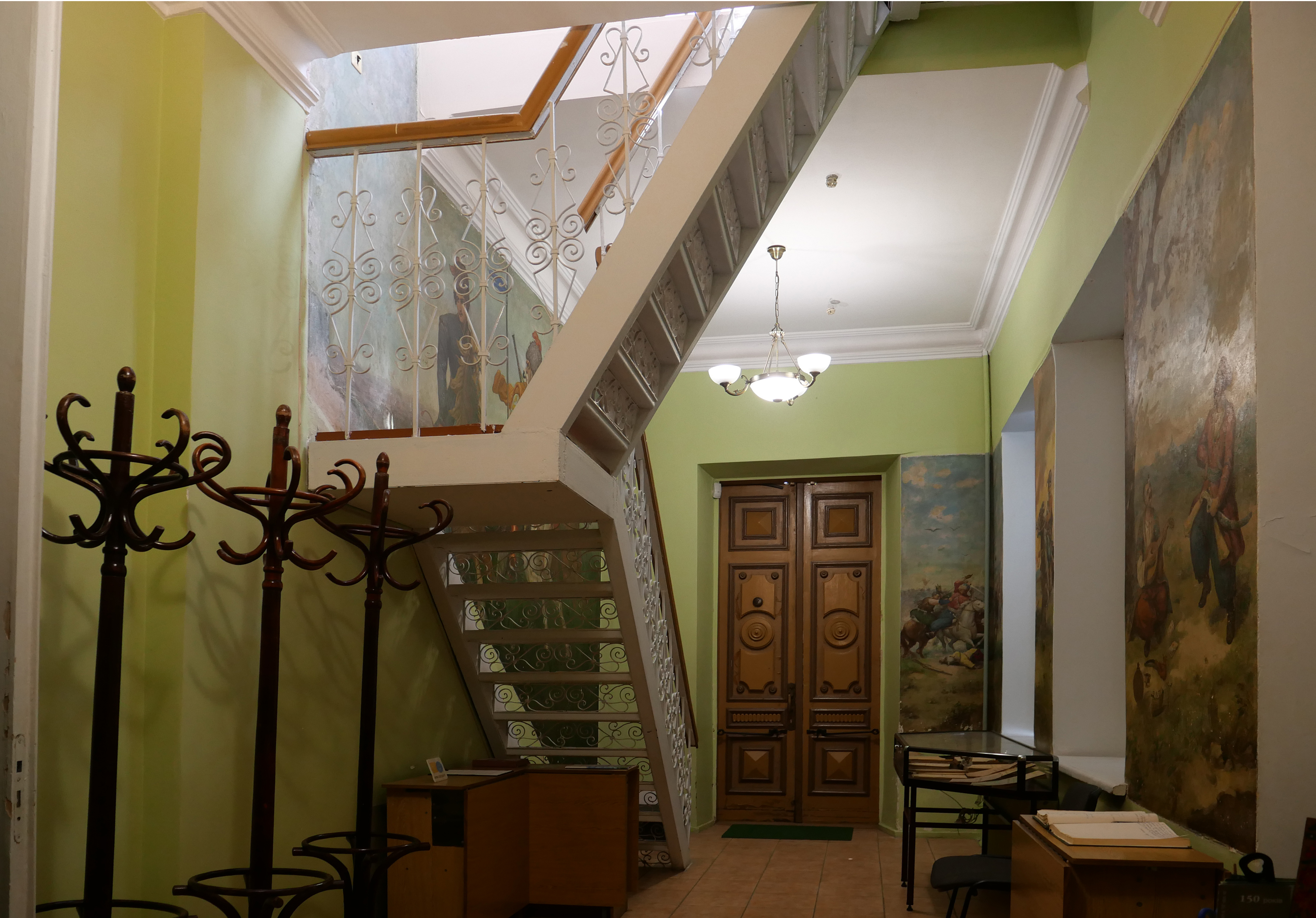
Foyer

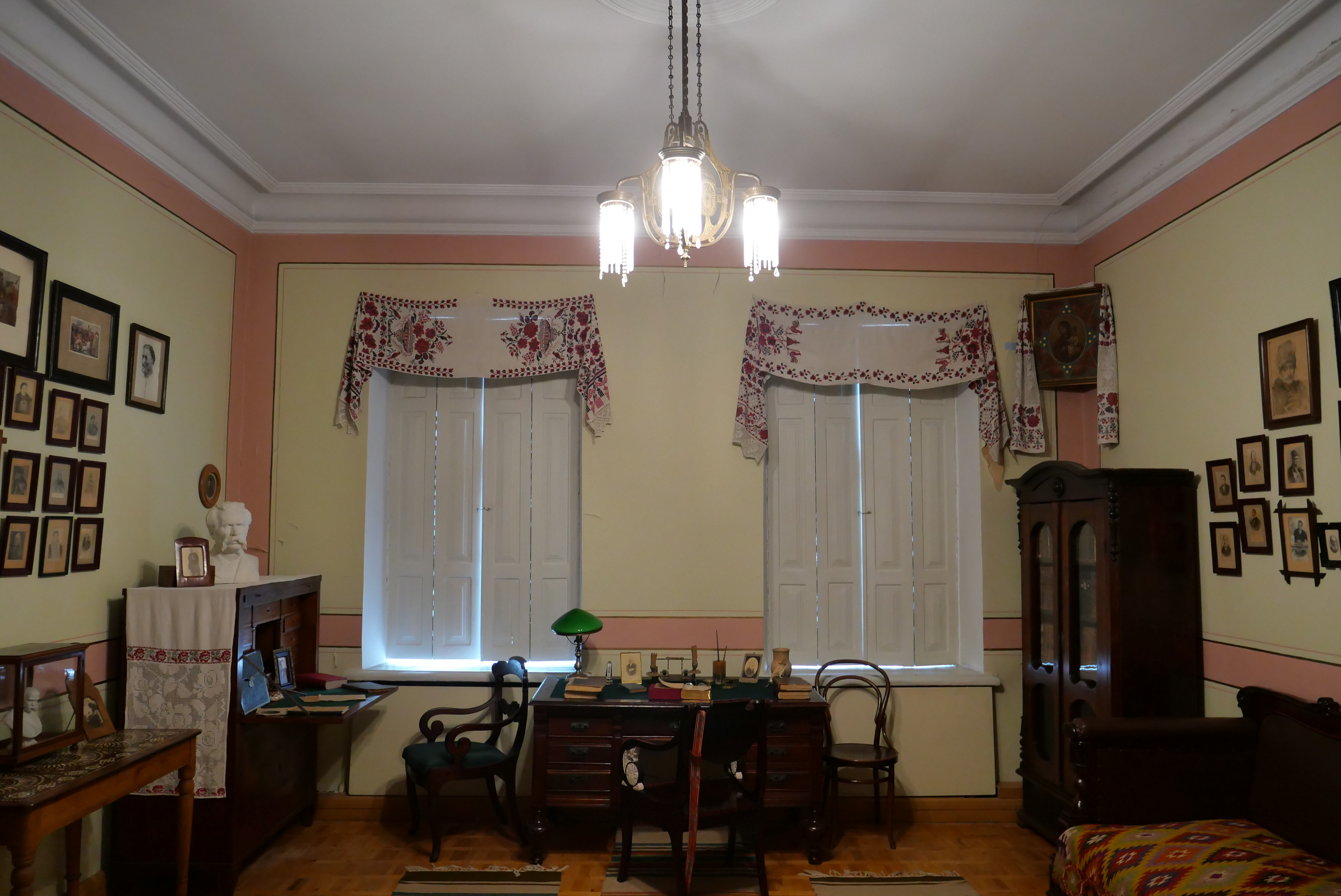
Living room

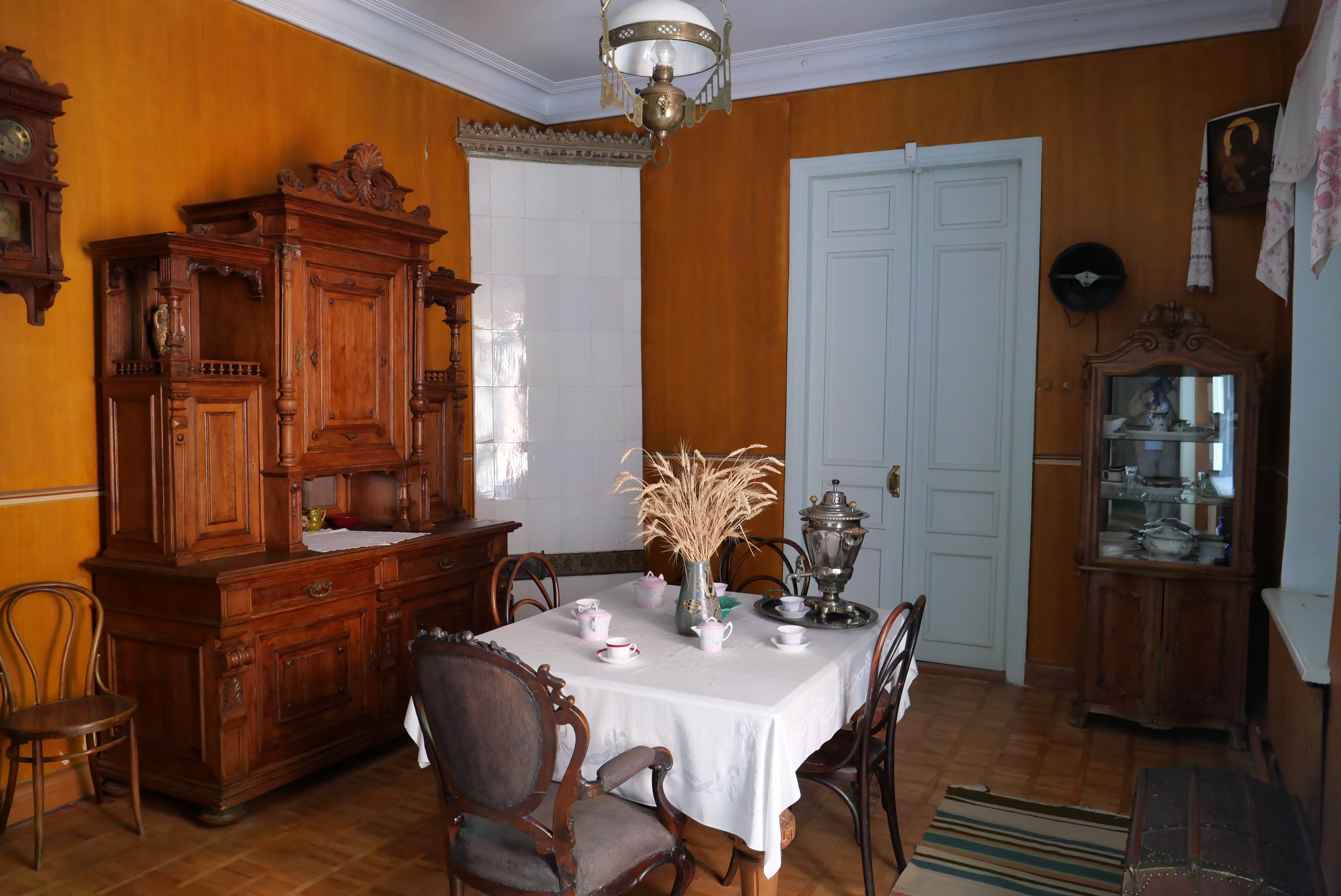
Dining room

== Gallery ==
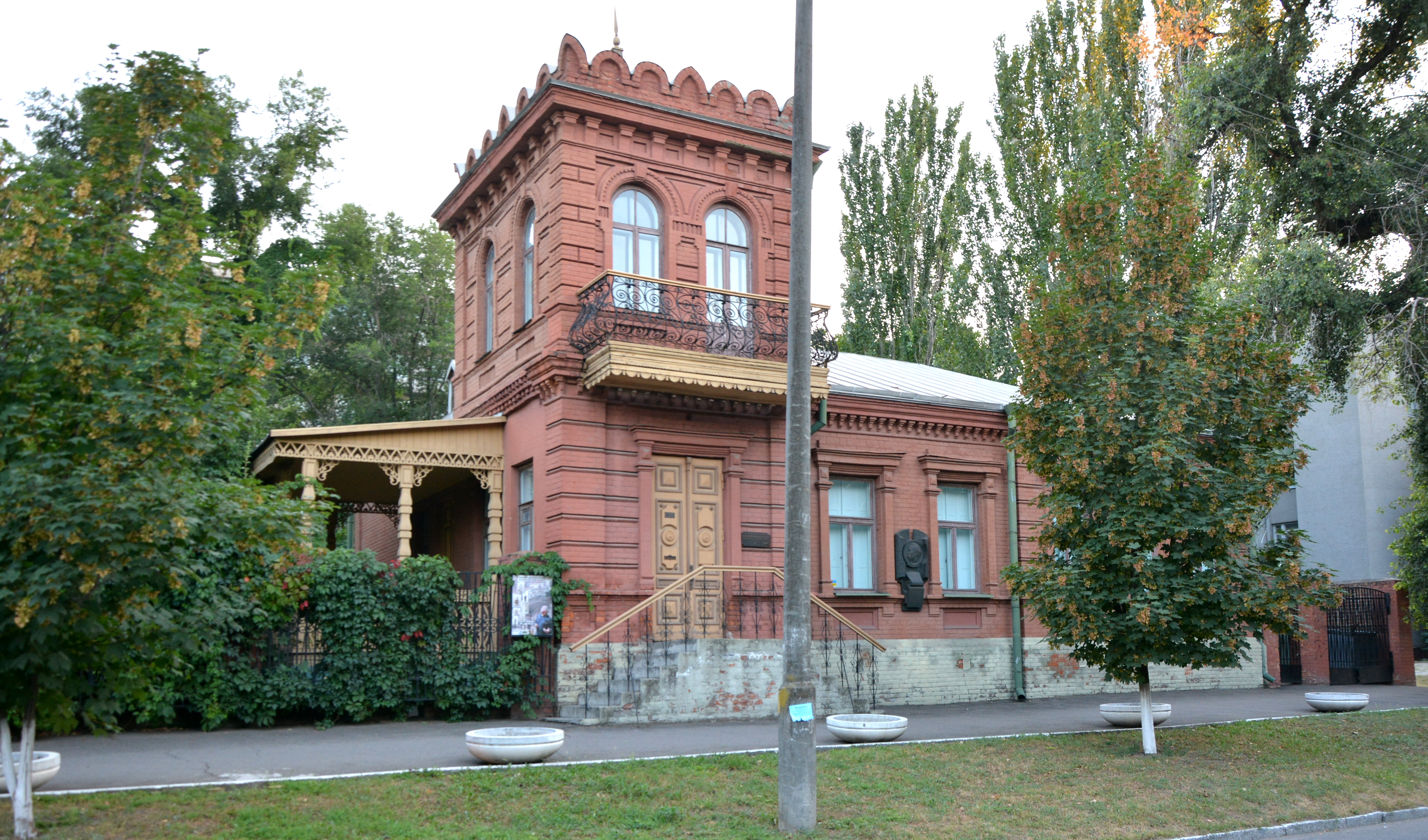
The house in 2015

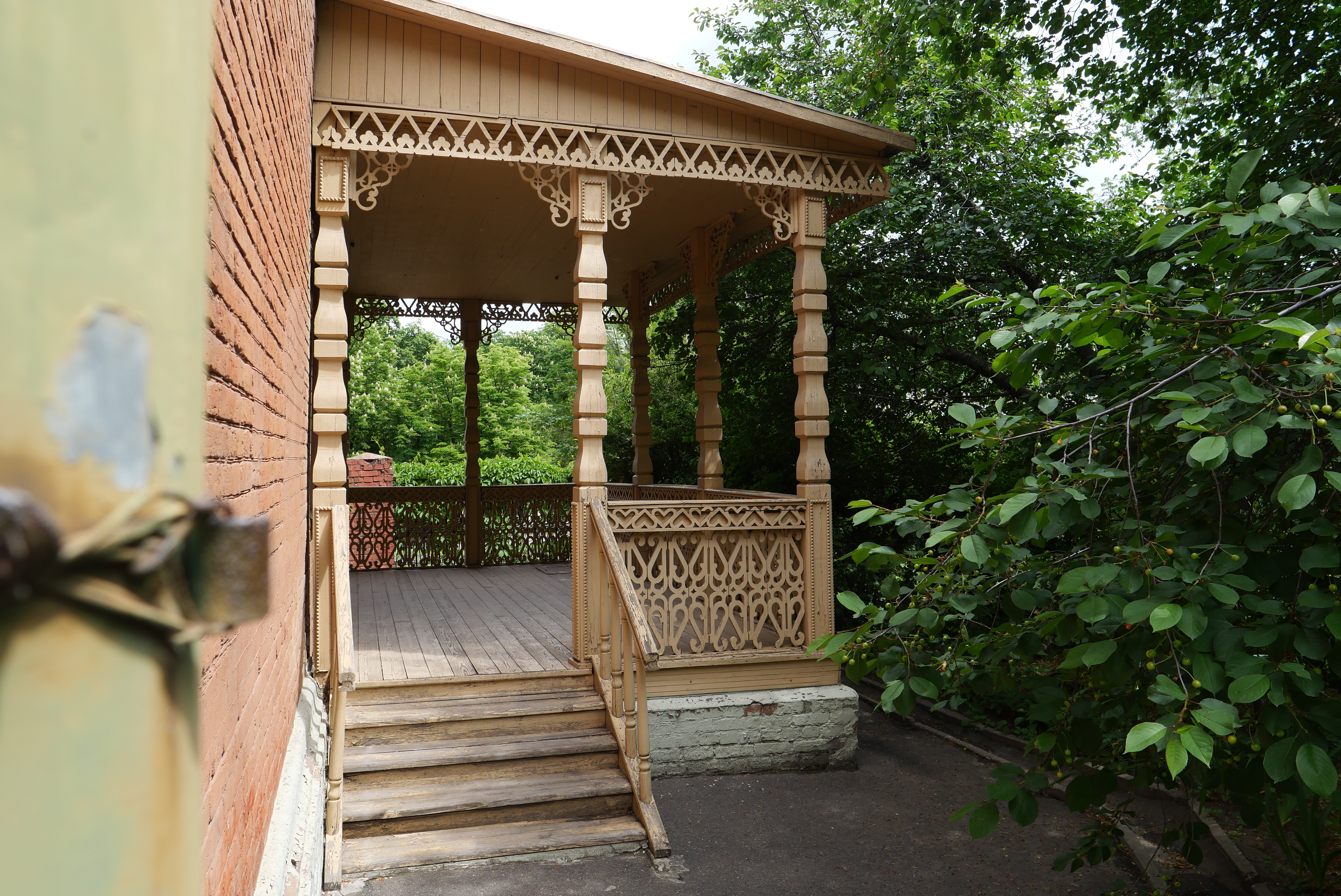
The house's porch

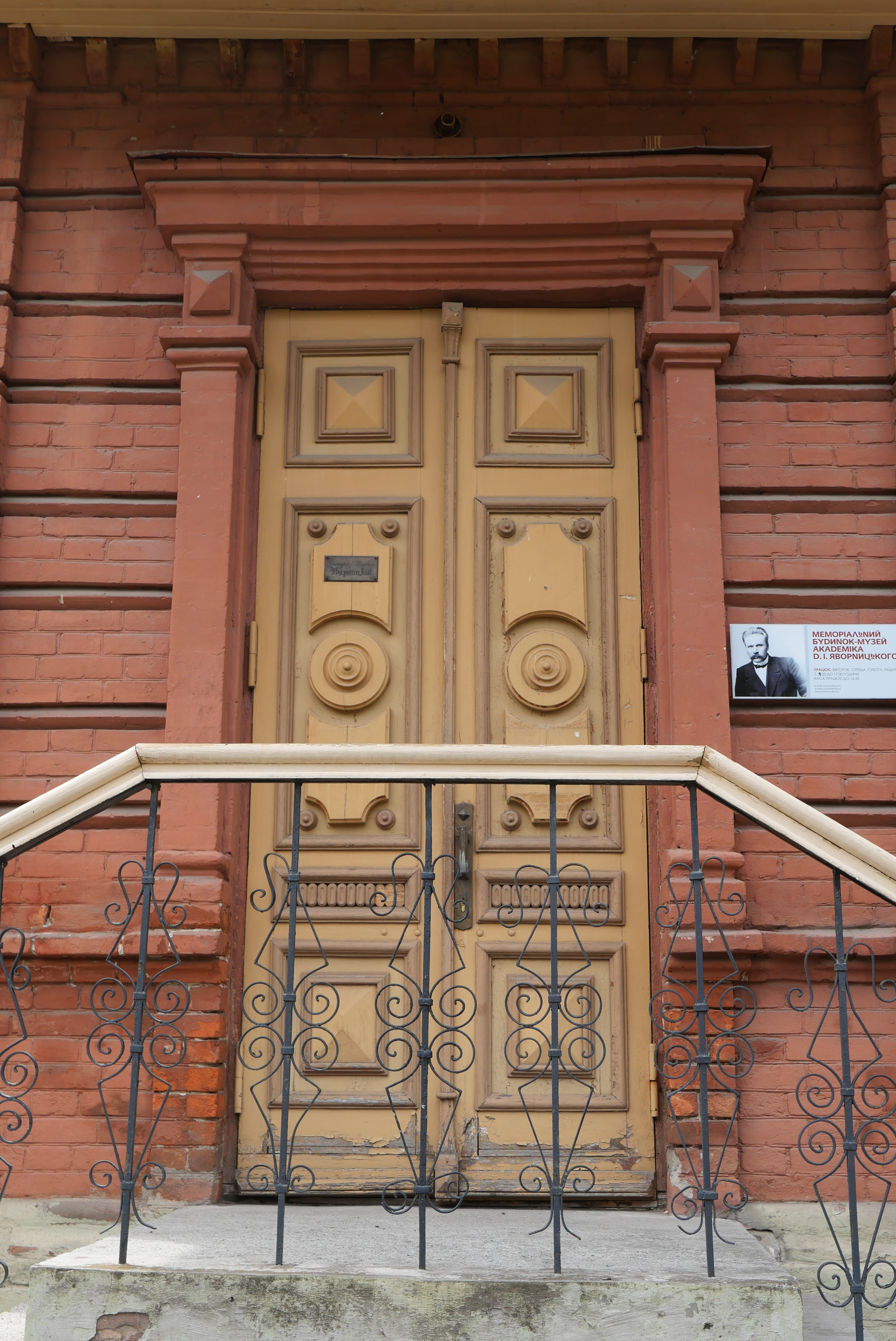
Main doors to the house

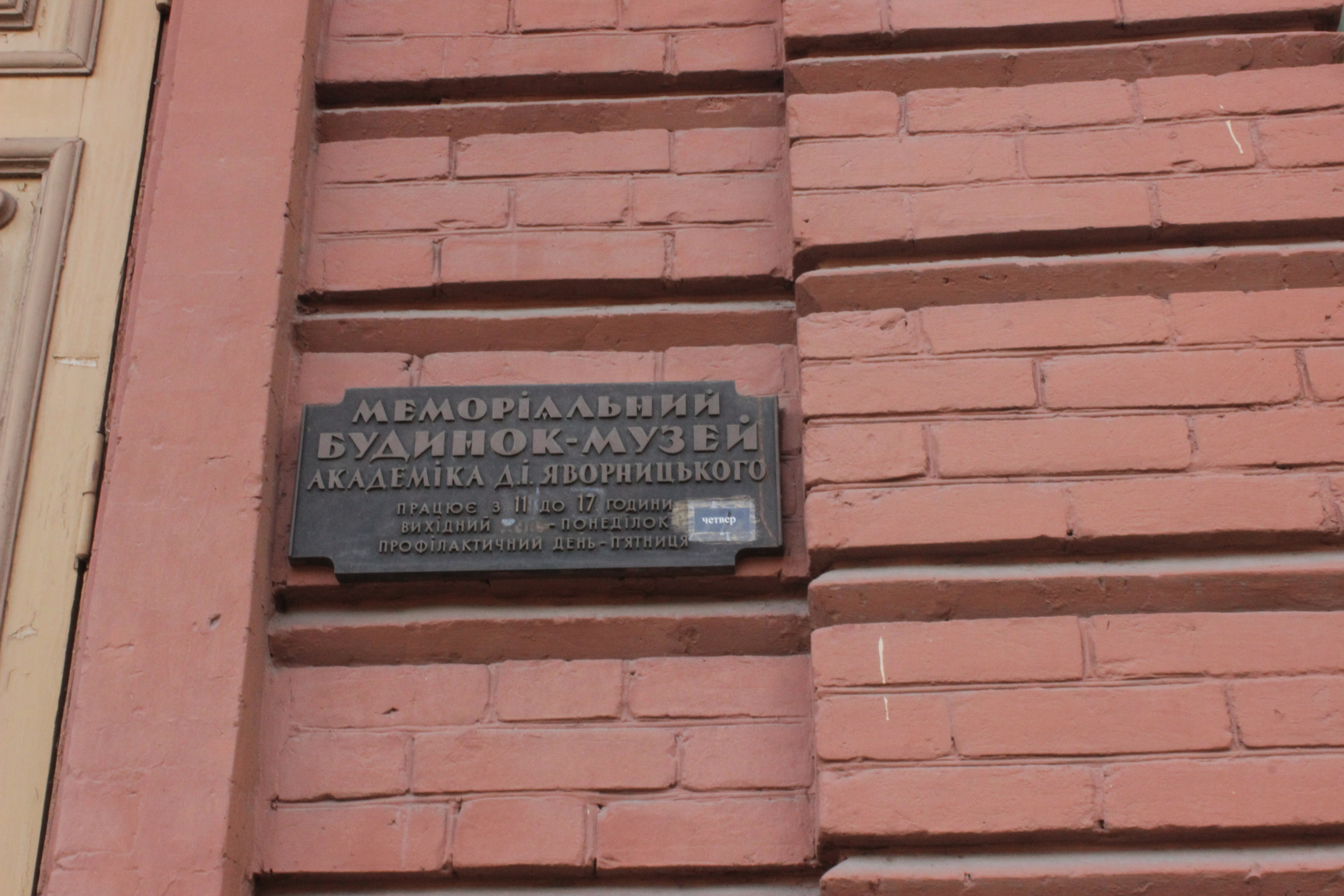
The museum plaque on the exterior of the house

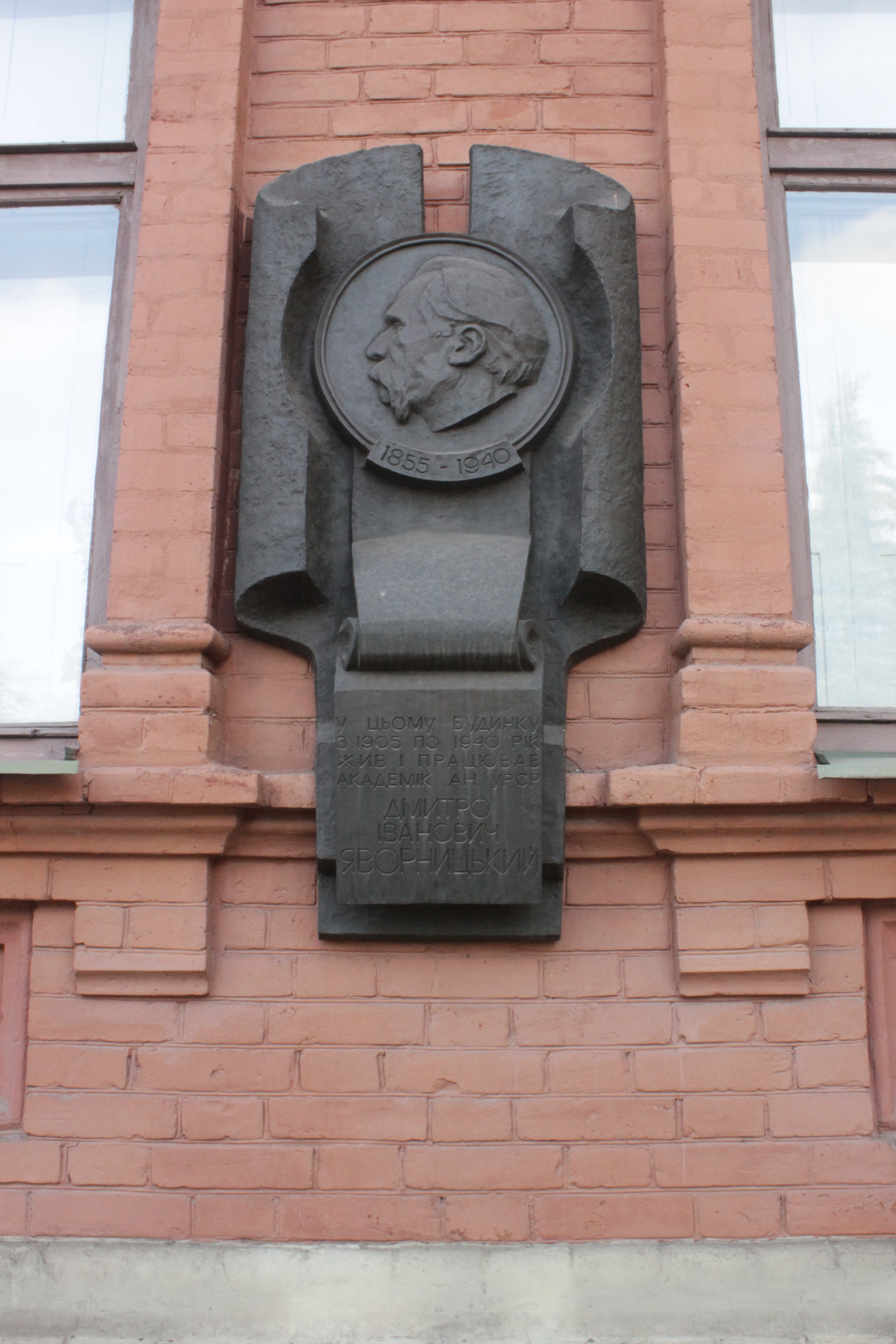
Yavornytsky commemorative plaque
