= Vatchenko =

Vatchenko is a surname. Notable people with the surname include:

- Horpyna Vatchenko (1923–2004), Ukrainian historian
- Oleksiy Vatchenko (1914–1984), Ukrainian and Soviet politician
