= Kernosivsky idol =

Bronze Age Kurgan stele

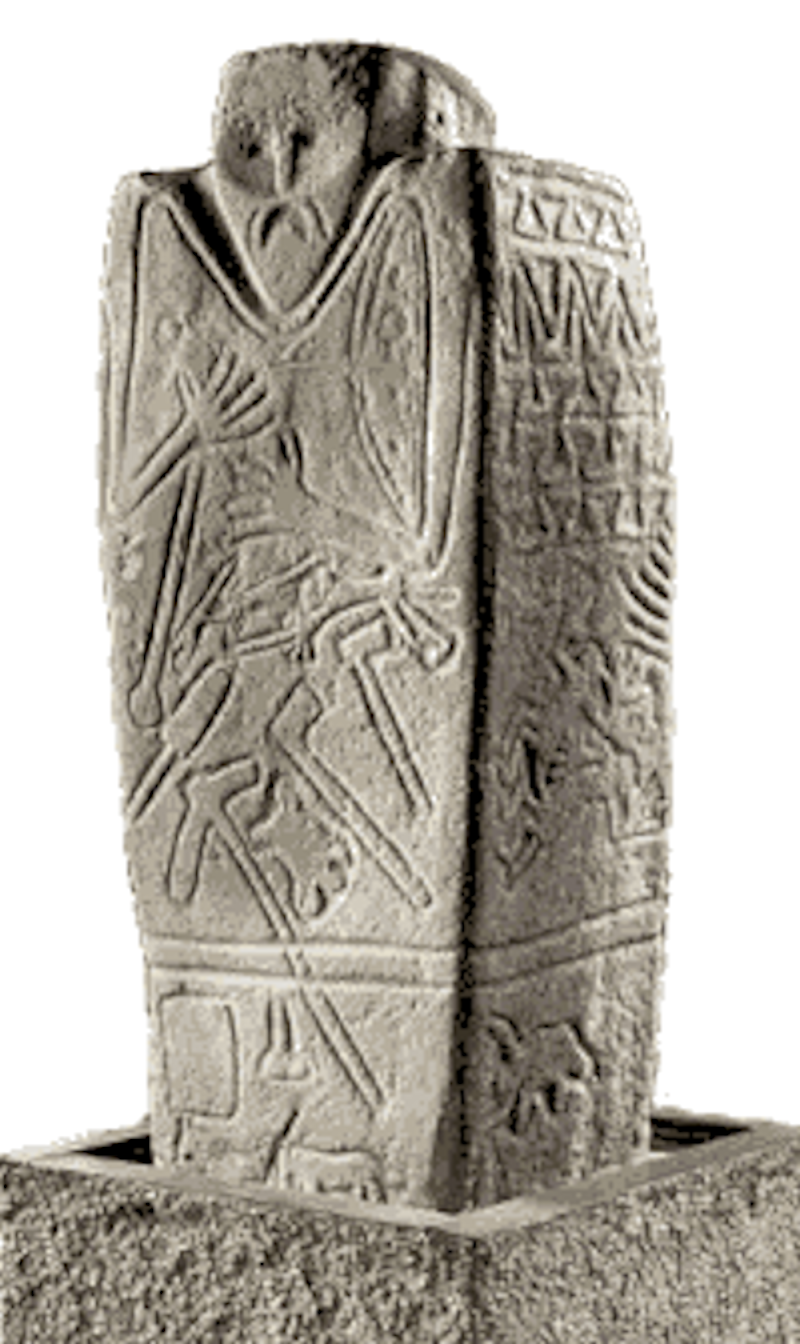
- Material: Sandstone
- Height: 1.2 meters
- Width: 36 cm (14 in)
- Depth: 24 cm (9.4 in)
- Weight: 238.5 kg (526 lb)
- Created: c. 2500 BC
- Discovered: 1973; Kernosivka, Dnipropetrovsk, Ukrainian SSR, Soviet Union
- Present location: Dmytro Yavornytsky National Historical Museum of Dnipro

The Kernosivskyi idol, or Kernosovsky idol (Ukrainian: Керносівський ідол, Russian: Керносовский идол) is a Kurgan stele dating from the mid–3rd millennium BC. It was discovered in 1973 in the village of Kernosivka, in Dnipropetrovsk Oblast, Ukrainian SSR, Soviet Union. It is held in the collection of the Dmytro Yavornytsky National Historical Museum of Dnipro.

== Discovery ==
The unique stele was found in 1973 in Kernosivka, Novomoskovsk raion, by workmen who were digging a trench for a silo. Its importance went unrecognised and it was put aside for disposal, but school children found it and informed the Dmytro Yavornytsky National Historical Museum of Dnipro. It was named after the place that it was discovered by the museum archaeologist Lyudmila Krylova.

After accession and documentation, the sculpture was displayed at the Dnipro National Historical Museum. Local public interest was not significant, and the object was loaned for temporary display to the Pushkin Museum, where it was extremely popular. From Moscow, its loan transferred to the Hermitage Museum in Saint Petersburg, where it was displayed for three months. As a result of its popularity, and the wider context of the Hermitage's prehistoric collections, a request was made that the idol's permanent location should be at the Hermitage. Due to the work of the director of the Dnipro National Historical Museum, Horpyna Vatchenko, a change in terms of the loan was denied and the object returned to its home region. This return was also supported by Vatchenko's brother, Oleksiy Vatchenko, who was chairman of the Presidium of the Supreme Soviet of the Ukrainian Soviet Socialist Republic.

== Description ==
The sandstone sculpture is 1.2 meters high, 36 cm wide and 24 cm deep. It is an anthropomorphic sculpture: the upper part shows a male figure with an elongated face, deep-set eyes and a moustache. The figure is nude; the only clothing worn are a belt and shoes. The figure's genitals are prominent. The lower segment of the block narrows and was buried in the ground. There is damage from its initial excavation by bulldozer to the right side of the figure.

All four sides of the figure are covered with numerous drawings, sculpted in low relief. One interpretation of the artwork on the back of the figure is that it depicts a tree of life. Regular circles and squares above the ribs, symbolise the sun and the moon. These images testify to the ritual, sacred purpose of the stele. Other illustrations include: weaponry - a bow and arrow and a mace; tools - axes, a hoe, a crucible; animals - a bull, two horse and turtles; on one side a man and a woman are copulating; there are also geometric designs.

== Dating and analysis ==
After much controversy, the object was dated to the mid 3rd millennium BC and is associated with the late Yamnaya culture.

According to the most common hypothesis, it depicts the supreme deity of the Indo-European pantheon. This connection was first proposed by Ukrainian archaeologist Valentyn Danylenko, who also proposed a connection between the idol and stories from the Rigveda.

One interpretation of the illustrations on the body of the figure is that they may show tattoos.

== Gallery ==
Illustrations on front of stele

Illustrations on back of stele

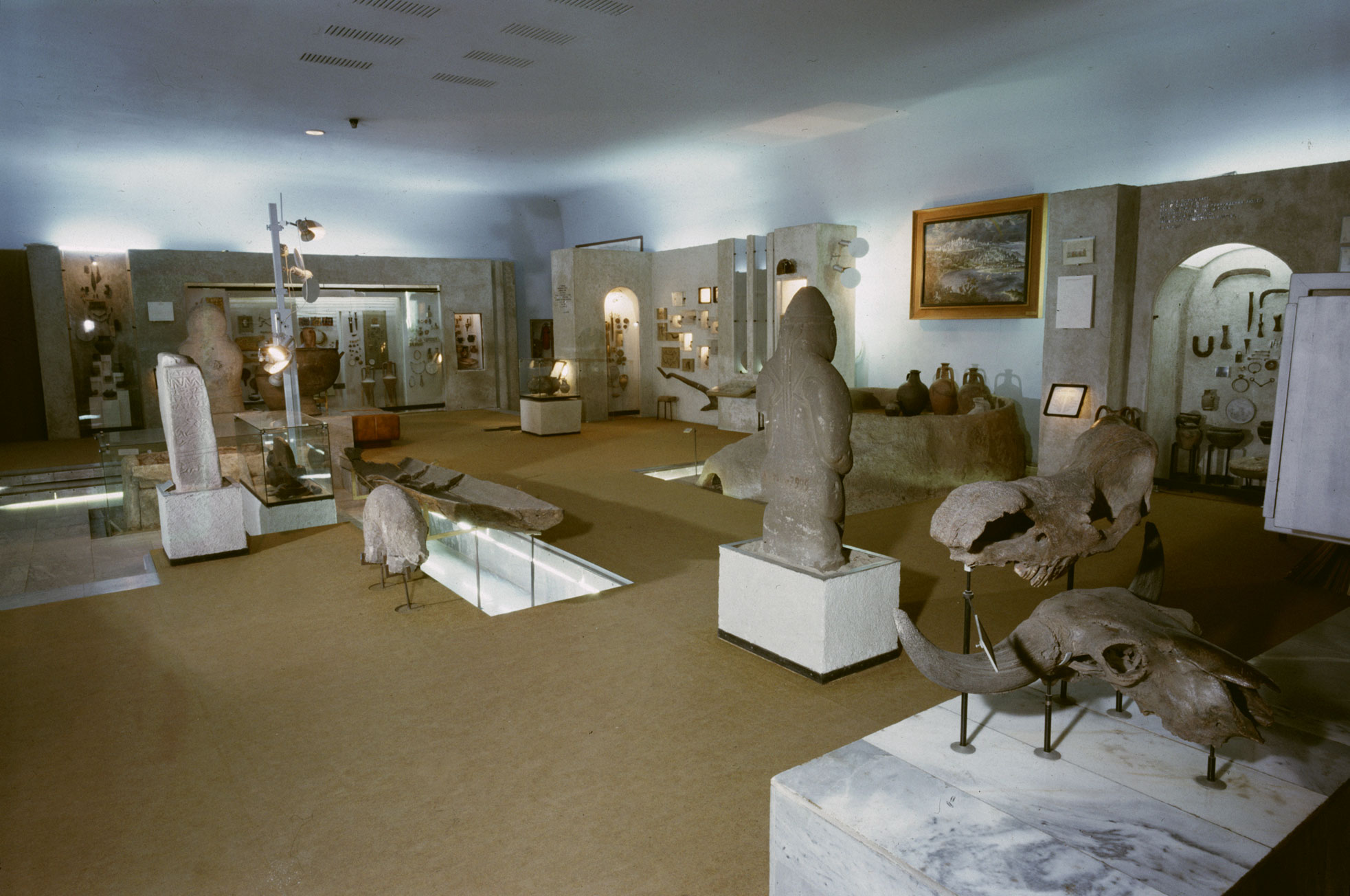
Room 1 at Dmytro Yavornytsky National Historical Museum of Dnipro, idol is to the left of the image.
