= Horpyna Vatchenko =

Ukrainian historian (1923–2004)

- Горпина Ватченко
- Born: 6 July 1923; Dnipropetrovsk, USSR
- Died: 9 November 2004 (aged 81); Dnipro, Ukraine
- Citizenship: Ukraine
- Occupation: Museum director
- Employer: Dmytro Yavornytsky National Historical Museum of Dnipro
- Family: Oleksiy Vatchenko, sibling
- Awards: Shevchenko Prize (1979); Honoured Worker of Culture of the USSR (1980)

Horpyna Fedosiyivna Vatchenko (Ukrainian: Горпина Федосіївна Ватченко, also known as Agrippina Vatchenko; 6 July 1923 – 9 November 2004) was a Ukrainian historian and director of the Dmytro Yavornytsky National Historical Museum of Dnipro, where she led a programme of expansion and redevelopment during the 1970s.

== Biography ==
Vatchenko was born on 6 July 1923 in Dnipro (formerly Dnipropetrovsk). In 1948, she graduated from the Faculty of History of Dnipropetrovsk University. In the same year she began work as a researcher at Dmytro Yavornytsky National Historical Museum of Dnipro, and from 1963 was appointed as its director.

Under her directorship the museum's collection also expanded: in 1948 it contained 33,000 objects, but by 2012 the number had grown to 200,000 objects.

In the 1960s Vatchenko was involved in attempts to republish the works of Dmytro Yavornytsky. She persuaded her brother Oleksiy, who was member of the Politburo of the Central Committee of the Communist Party of Ukraine, to support the project. However, once the works were ready for publication he refused his sister, stating that he could lose his post due to the impartiality of historians' comments.

In 1973 schoolchildren found the Kernosivsky idol, which had initially discovered by workmen using a bulldozer. Over six thousand years old, it is covered with carvings and is interpreted as depicting the "supreme god Aryan pantheon". However at the time, there was little interest and it was loaned to the Hermitage Museum, who wanted to make the loan permanent. Vatchenko, potentially assisted by her brother, Oleksiy, resisted this change to the loan agreement and enabled the return of the idol to the museum. It has since become one of the most significant objects in the museum's collection.

In the 1970s, Vatchenko led the re-development of the museum, and as of 2012, some of its exhibitions still dated to this period in the museum's history. The re-development, described as "radical" in the Encyclopaedia of Modern Ukraine, included the creation of a diorama depicting the Battle of the Dnieper at the Diorama "Battle of the Dnieper". In 1979, she employed a young Nadiya Kapustina (uk) as a guide to the diorama; in 1998 Kapustina was appointed director of the museum.

Vatchenko retired as director of the museum in 1983. She died in Dnipro on 9 November 2004, aged 81.

== Awards ==
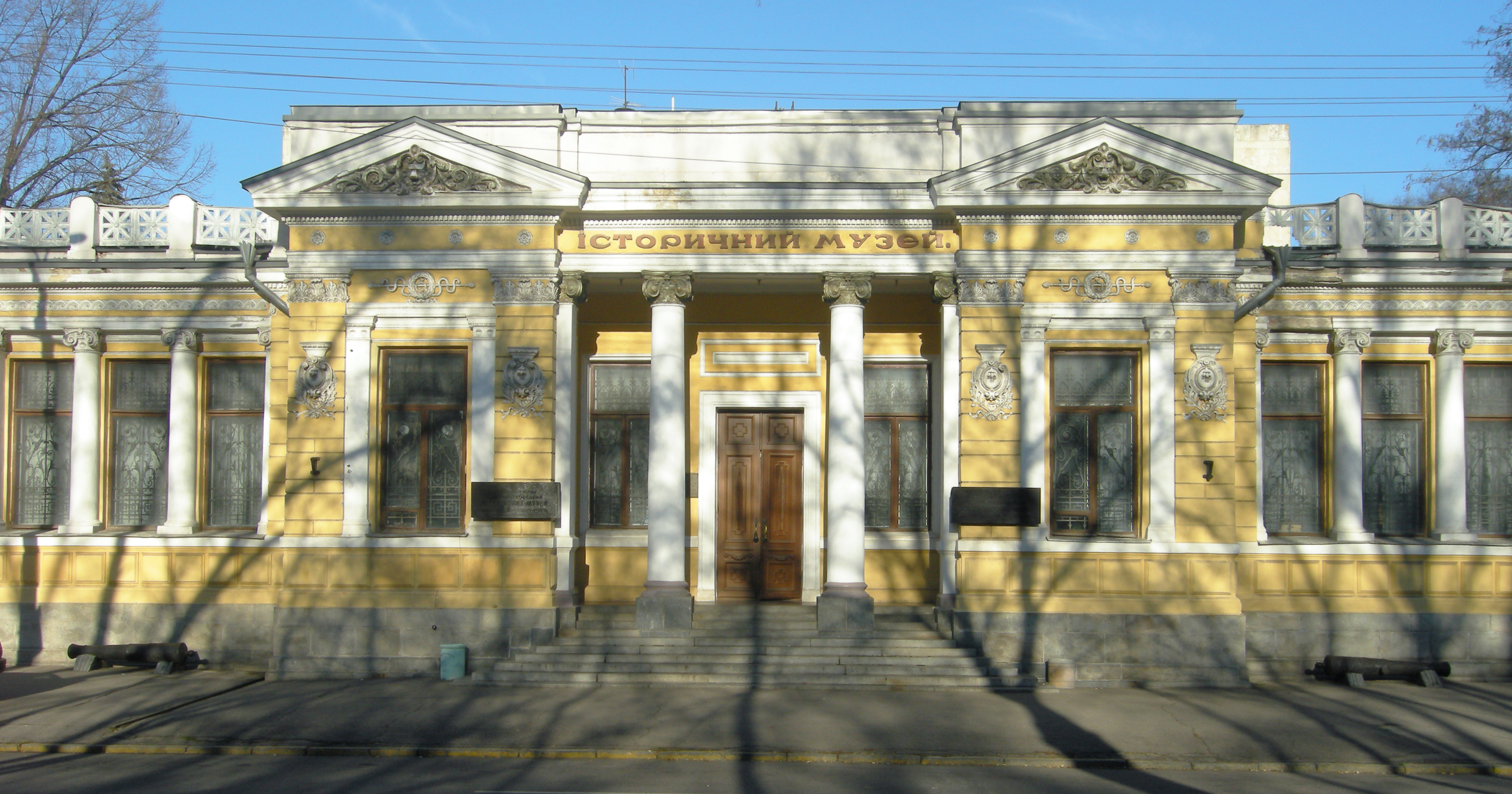
National Historical Museum of Dnipro

- Honoured Worker of Culture of the USSR since 1980.
- Recipient of the Shevchenko Prize in 1979 for the complex of the Dnipro National Historical Museum.
