= Dmytro Yavornytsky =

Ukrainian academician

- Дмитро Яворницький
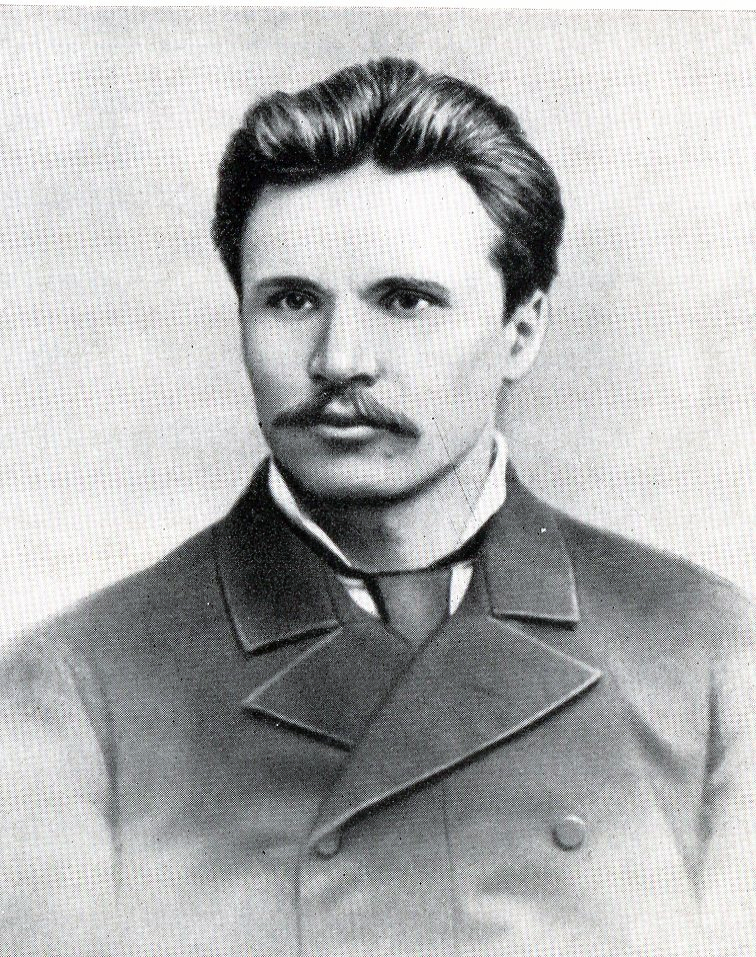
- Yavornytsky in 1885
- Born: Dmytro Ivanovych Evarnytsky (Дмитро Іванович Еварницький); November 6, 1855; Solntsevka, Kharkov Governorate, Russian Empire (now Borysivka, Kharkiv Oblast, Ukraine)
- Died: August 5, 1940 (aged 84); Dnipropetrovsk, Ukrainian SSR, Soviet Union
- Other name: Dmytro Yavornytsky-Evarnytsky
- Citizenship: Russian Empire; Ukrainian People's Republic; Soviet Union
- Education: Kharkiv University
- Occupation: historian
- Employer(s): Historical Museum (1902—1933), Director
- Known for: his research for the Zaporozhian Sich
- Spouse: Varvara Kokina
- Awards: Acad. of Ukrainian Academy of Sciences
- Scientific career
- Workplaces: Imperial Moscow University
- Academic advisors: Alexander Potebnja; Mykola Sumtsov; Mykola Kostomarov
- Notable students: Kost Huslystyi

Signature
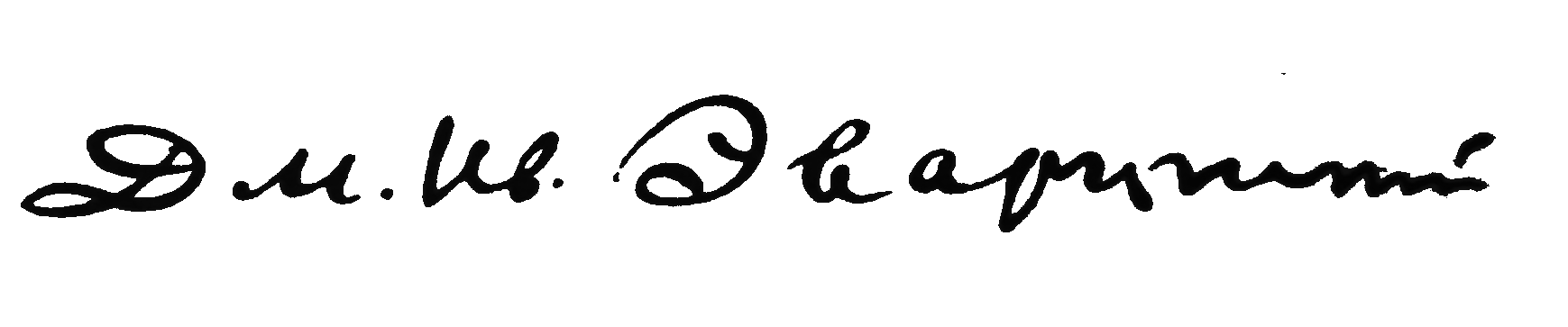

Dmytro Ivanovych Yavornytsky (Note: also known as Dmitry Ivanovich Yavornitsky (from Russian: Дмитрий Иванович Яворницкий), also known by his other surname Evarnytsky (Ukrainian: Еварницький; Russian: Эварницкий, romanized: Evarnitsky).) (Ukrainian: Дмитро Іванович Яворницький; November 6, 1855 – August 5, 1940) was a Ukrainian academician, historian, archeologist, ethnographer, folklorist, and lexicographer.

Yavornytsky was a member of Moscow Archaeological Society (from 1885), of All-Russian Archaeological Society (from 1886) and an academician of Ukrainian Academy of Sciences (from 1929).

He was recognised as one of the most prominent researchers of the Zaporozhian Cossacks from the time of the Cossack Hetmanate, and the author of their first general history. In recognition of his many contributions to the preservation of Zaporozhian Host history and culture, he is widely known in historiography as "the father of the Zaporozhians".

== Education and career ==
Yavornytsky was born as Dmytro Evarnytsky. His father Ivan Yakymovych Evarnytsky (1827–1885) belonged to Russian Imperial nobility. Dmytro was educated at Kharkiv University, Kazan, and Warsaw universities but his academic career was repeatedly interrupted for political reasons. Both as a student and later as a teacher, he was wrongly accused of "Ukrainian separatism" and dismissed from his position. In the 1890s, he was compelled to go to Russian Turkestan to find employment. In 1897, the Russian historian Vasily Klyuchevsky helped him to obtain a position as a lecturer on the Zaporozhian Cossacks at Moscow University. In 1902, when he was offered a position as Director of the Yekaterinoslav Historical Museum in modern-day central Ukraine, he gladly accepted and remained there to the end of his life.

== Historian ==
As a historian, Yavornytsky displayed a romantic-antiquarian approach to his subject and was a conscious follower of his predecessor Mykola Kostomarov. He was an enthusiast who avidly sought out documents and material artifacts, as well as stories and the songs of the elderly, concerning the Zaporozhian Cossacks, and he wrote his histories on the basis of this material. He was a pioneer of Zaporozhian history and was the first to compile an extensive archive of materials on their entire history — from their origins, to their demise. He published much of this material in various collections, often at his own expense.

Yavornytsky's major work was the History of the Zaporozhian Cossacks which was published in Russian in three volumes between 1892 and 1897. He planned, but never completed, a fourth volume. In this and in his other works, he portrayed the Zaporozhians as representatives of Ukrainian liberty. Later Ukrainian historians criticized him as being uncritical and unsystematic in his collection of source materials (Mykhailo Hrushevsky) and lacking an appreciation for Ukrainian statehood (Dmytro Doroshenko), but Yavornytsky wrote at a time when political circumstances and the Imperial Russian censors were extremely oppressive and any synthesis of Ukrainian history which displayed an enthusiasm for the subject, let alone political independence, was highly suspect. His History of the Zaporozhian Cossacks was a pioneering work which did display such an enthusiasm.

== Other scholarly interests ==
Yavornytsky was a pioneer in the fields of ethnography, folkloristics, and lexicography. He made numerous contributions to the historical geography of the Zaporozhian lands, and mapped in detail the Dnieper River rapids with the locations of the various Zaporozhian Siches, or fortified headquarters. He published a large collection of Ukrainian folksongs (1906; partly reprinted, 1990) as soon as the censor would permit it, contributed to Borys Hrinchenko's great Ukrainian dictionary, and after the Russian Revolution began publication of one of his own (1920).

He increased the holdings of the Yekaterinoslav Museum from 5,000 to 80,000 items. Yavornytsky commissioned the best Ukrainian and Russian artists of his time (Opanas Slastion, Serhii Vasylkivsky, Nikolai Samokish, and Ilya Repin) to illustrate his various books, which were sometimes works of art in themselves. Especially notable in this regard is his From Ukrainian Antiquity (1900; reprinted in Ukrainian translation, 1991) which was lavishly illustrated in full colour and contained parallel texts in Russian and French so that it could be read abroad.

== Criticism ==
In his correspondence and articles written during the Tsarist era, Yavornytsky pledged loyalty to the Russian Empire and denied any support to Ukraine's independence, calling the country an inalienable part of Russia. During the Revolution of 1905 he spent some time editing a newspaper issued by the Yekaterinoslav branch of the Union of Russian People, at the time aligned with the Octobrist party. This attracted strong criticism from the liberal Ukrainian press. A 1906 article in Kyiv's Rada newspaper, edited by Yevhen Chykalenko, doubted Yavornytsky's right to call himself a historian, describing him as a "halushky patriot" due to the largely ethnographic character of his works, and accused him of "Black Hundred constitutionalism".

According to Viktor Petrov, Yavornytsky was one of the last representatives of the Romanticist trend in Ukrainian historical science founded by Gogol and Kostomarov.

== Legacy ==
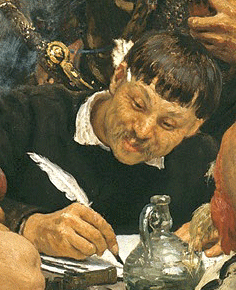
Detail of The Reply of the Zaporozhian Cossacks (1880-91) in which Yavornytsky is pictured as the secretary.

During the repressions of the 1930s under Joseph Stalin, Yavornytsky was prevented from publishing and had to keep a very low profile. During the Holodomor (the Ukrainian famine of 1932–33), he felt compelled to give away artifacts from his collections to obtain food for starving local peasants and others.

His death passed unnoticed both in the USSR and in the wider world. The Yekaterinoslav Museum was eventually renamed in his honour, as the Dmytro Yavornytsky National Historical Museum of Dnipro. He was partially rehabilitated during the Nikita Khrushchev and Petro Shelest eras. Materials about him began to appear, and in the early 1970s a four volume collection of his works was prepared for publication, supported by museum director Horpyna Vatchenko. Political circumstances again prevented this from happening, but with the advent of the Perestroika reforms in the late 1980s, new materials began to appear and his major works were republished. At that time, his History of the Zaporozhian Cossacks was reprinted both in Russian and in Ukrainian (1990–91). The Ukrainian edition contains numerous additional illustrations. In 2004, the first volume of his Collected Works in Twenty Volumes was published. The first ten volumes of this collection will be dedicated to his historical, geographical, and archaeological works, while the second ten volumes will contain his works on folklore, ethnography, and language.

Today, Yavornytsky is still widely revered as "the father of the Zaporozhians" in the field of historiography.

In order to comply with decommunization laws the city of Dnipropetrovsk renamed its main street from Karl Marx Avenue to Yavornytskyi Avenue in February 2016.

Yavornytsky is portrayed on the painting of Ilya Repin's "The Satirical Reply of the Zaporozhian Cossacks to Sultan Mehmed IV of Turkey" as the secretary penning the letter to the Sultan. Repin consulted Yavornytsky during his work on the painting and made use of several artifacts from the historian's collection to use as accurate models.

== Literature ==
- Dmytro Doroshenko, "Survey of Ukrainian Historiography," Annals of the Ukrainian Academy of Arts and Sciences in the US, V-VI (1957), 242–4.
- Thomas M. Prymak, "Dmytro Yavornytsky and the Romance of Cossack History," Forum: A Ukrainian Review, no. 82 (Summer–Fall 1990), 17–23. This article is richly illustrated.
