= Diorama "Battle of the Dnieper" =

Museum in Dnipro, Ukraine

- Діорама «Битва за Дніпро»
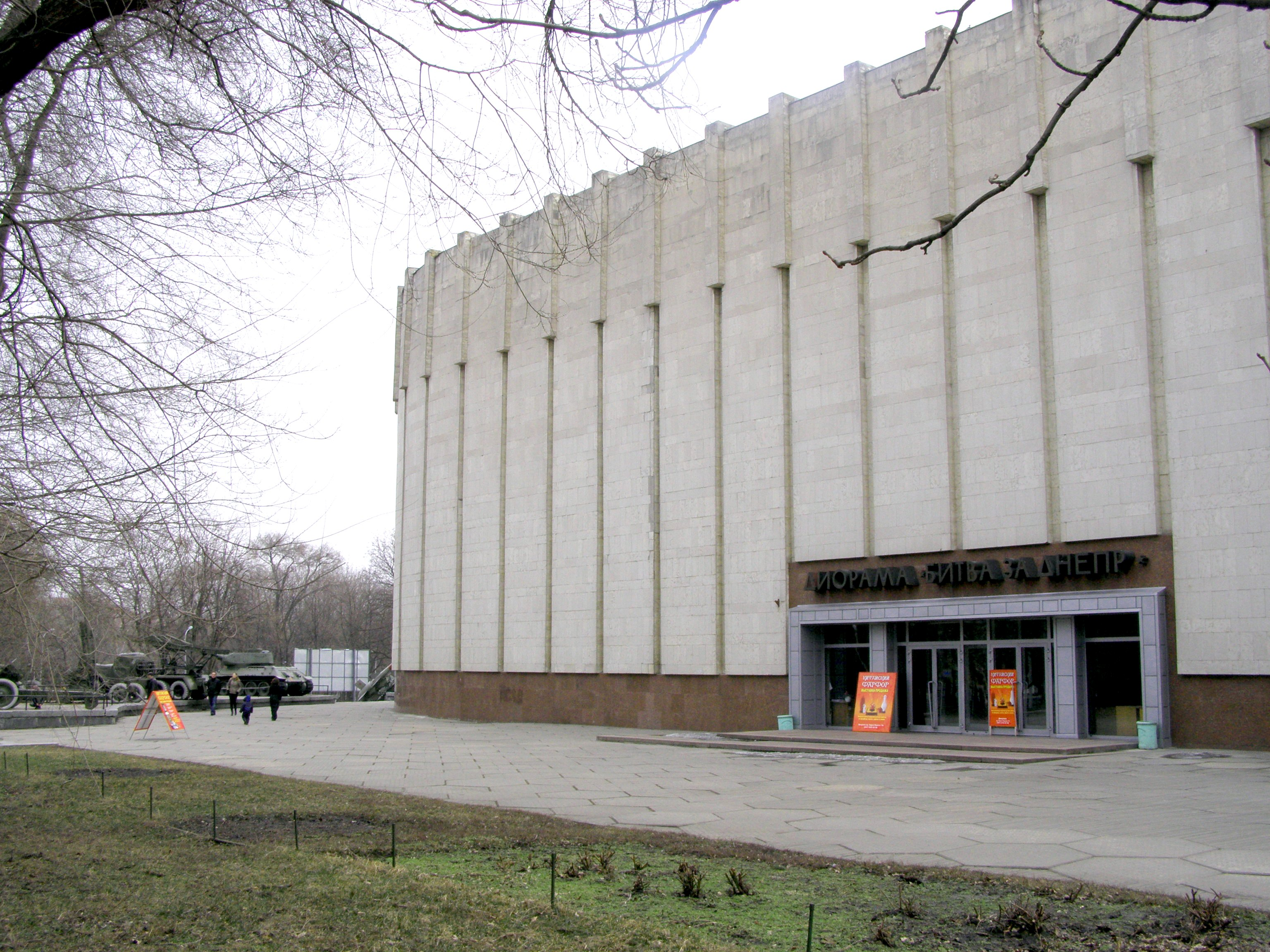
- The museum in 2011
- Established: 17 May 1975
- Location: 16 Dmytro Yavornytskyi, Dnipro, Ukraine
- Coordinates: 48°27′21″N 35°03′50″E
- Type: Diorama museum
- Accreditation: Dmytro Yavornytsky National Historical Museum of Dnipro
- Director: Vitaliy Stepanovych Prokudo
- Architect: Vladimir Zuev
- Website: www.museum.dp.ua/en/tours-en/diorama-battle-for-the-dnieper-en-en

The Diorama "Battle of the Dnieper" (Ukrainian: Діорама «Битва за Дніпро», romanized: Diorama «Bytva za Dnipro») is a diorama museum in the city of Dnipro, Ukraine. It's the biggest diorama in the country, among the biggest in the world, and the second largest in Europe. The Dnipro Bridgehead Memorial is situated 52 kilometres (32 mi) from the regional center, where the actual Dnieper crossing can be viewed.

== History ==
One of the biggest conflicts in global history was the Battle of the Dnieper. During World War II, it was a sequence of connected strategic maneuvers that happened along the banks of the river in the fall of 1943, from 26 September to 23 October. It was the first forced crossing of a strategically significant body of water. The left bank of the river was freed from the Wehrmacht as a consequence of offensive engagements fought in very challenging circumstances. The conflict had over four million participants on both sides, and the battlefront covered more than 1,400 kilometres (870 mi).

August 1971 saw the start of construction of the Diorama "Battle for the Dnieper" in the Dnipropetrovsk Historical Museum. On 23 February 1972, the Dnipropetrovsk (Note: Dnipro has been renamed multiple time; it has its current name since 2016 when it was renamed (from Dnipropetrovsk) to comply with decommunization laws. It was named Dnipropetrovsk from 1926. The city was originally known as Katerynoslav.) City Council of Workers' Deputies gave their approval for the diorama to be built. The building took four years to complete, from 1971 to 1975.

In commemoration of the 30th anniversary of the Victory in Europe Day, the diorama "Battle for the Dnieper" in Dnipropetrovsk opened its doors on 7 May 1975. The diorama was produced by Nikolay Jakovlevitsj But and Mykola Vasyliovych Ovechkin, who are experts of war painting from the military art studio named after M.B. Grekov. An 840 square metres (9,000 sq ft) solid-woven canvas is situated within a structure created by architect Vladimir Zuyev.

The vicinity of the structure has been transformed into a monument commemorating the Russian invasion of Ukraine in 2014. An outdoor exhibition including destroyed cars and war remnants was set up to narrate the tale of Russia's takeover of Crimea in 2014. 2016 saw the opening of the first ATO Museum in Ukraine's internal and external exhibits. The museum was renovated in 2018.

== Diorama and collections ==
The diorama is located close to a permanent exhibition of Soviet military equipment from World War II, including howitzers, tanks, and anti-aircraft weapons. Its collection includes tanks from World War II (T-34-85 and T-70), a surface-to-air missile system (S-125), a field gun (BS-3) and a BM-13 Katyusha rocket launcher based on the ZIS-151 chassis. The "Ways of Donbas" street exhibition replicates the ambiance of the War in Donbas. A destroyed BMP-2 infantry fighting vehicle, a T-64 tank turret, a mortar, a damaged ambulance and pieces of the Donetsk airport's fortifications.

The impression of direct Soviet soldier presence in the location of the Dnieper storming is produced by the wide viewing radius (up to 230°; typically, the viewing angle of the dioramas is between 120° and 150°), a deep subject plan made up of the remnants of defensive structures, weapons, crossing facilities, and other military attributes, special lighting, and sound effects. The war's reports, letters, orders, and memoirs of the soldiers involved in the Dnieper crossing were examined in order to recreate both the overall vision and specific moments of the battle.

== Gallery ==
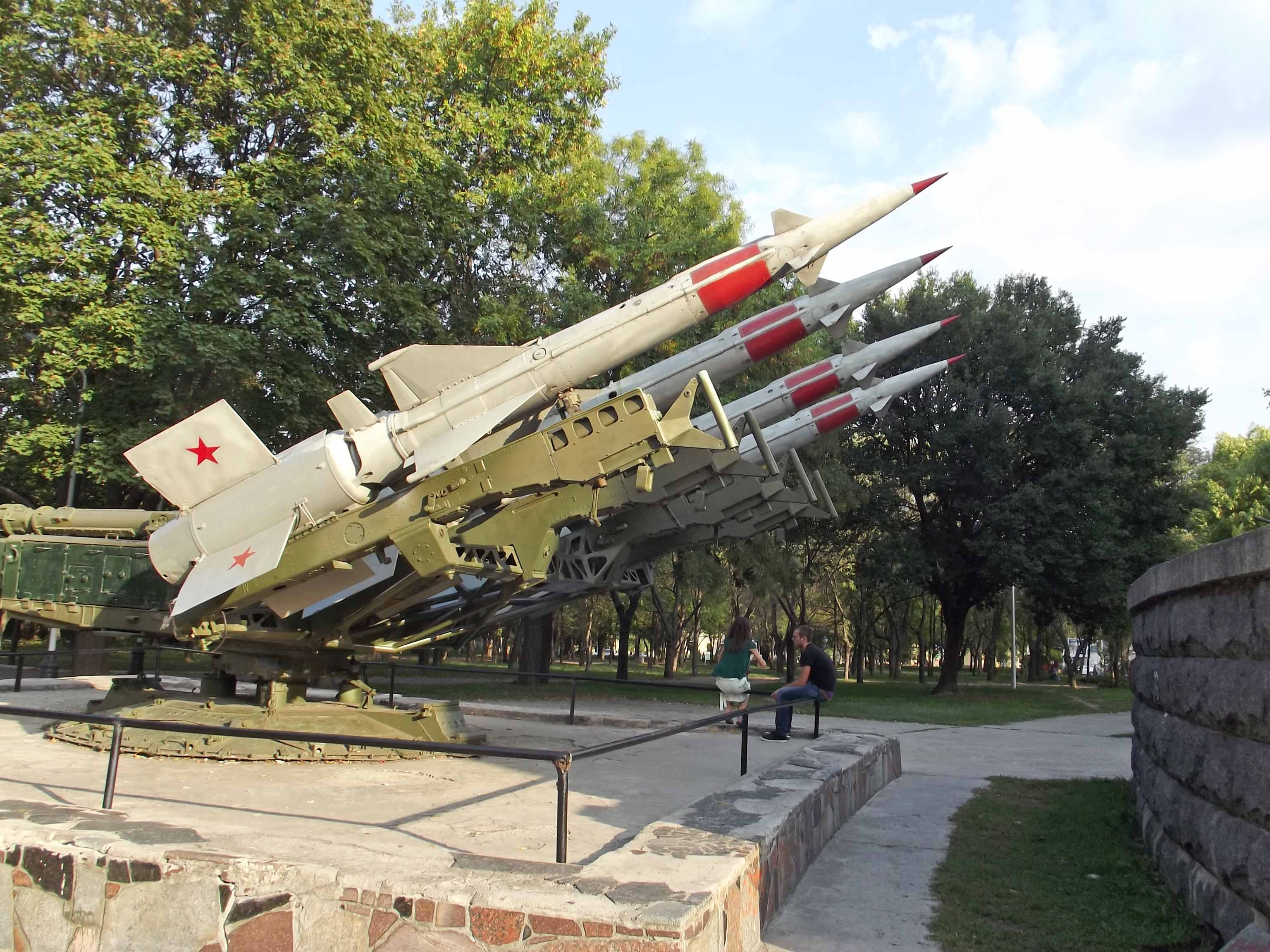
S-125 missile system in 2011

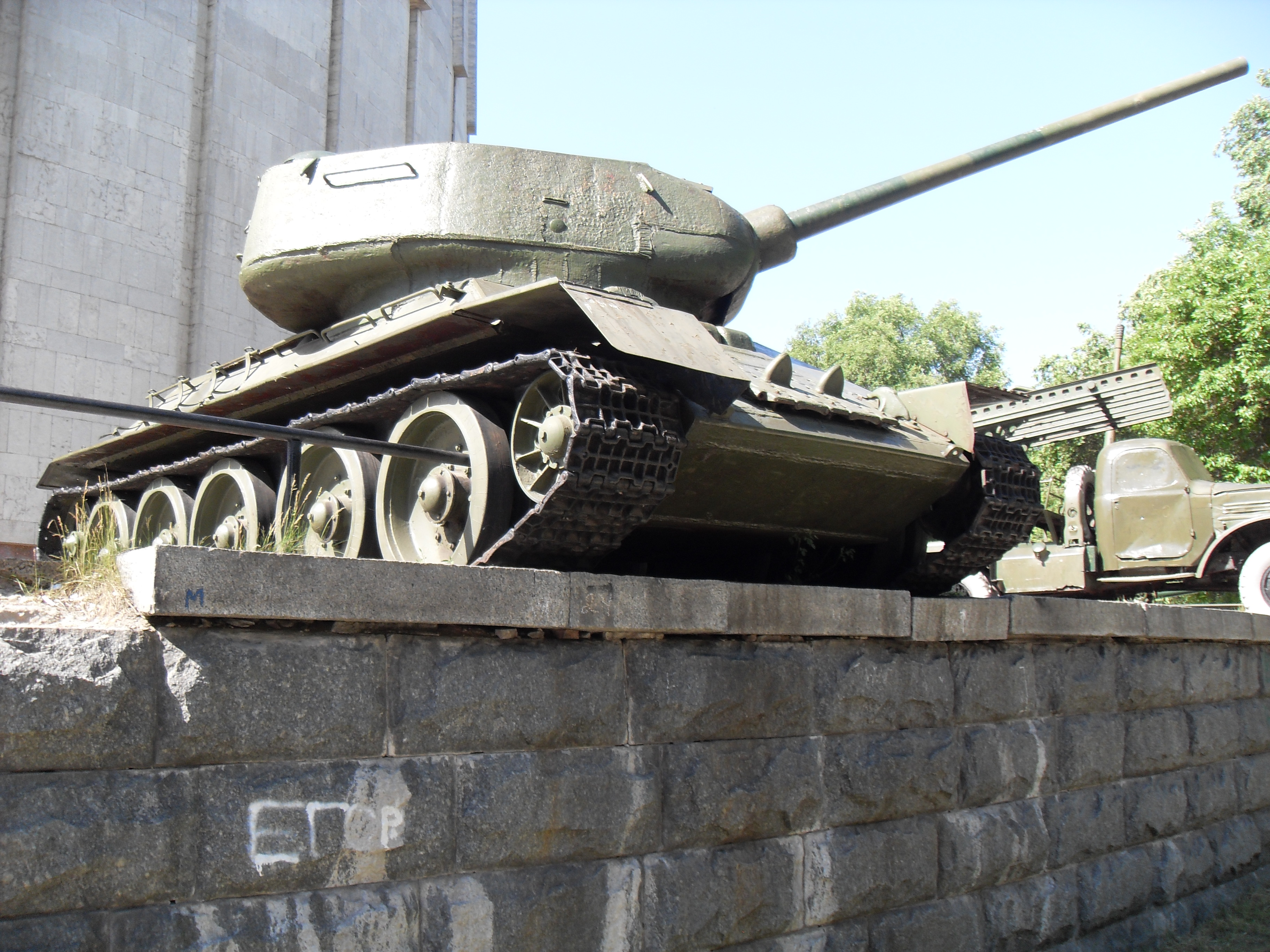
The museum's T-34-85 tank in 2011

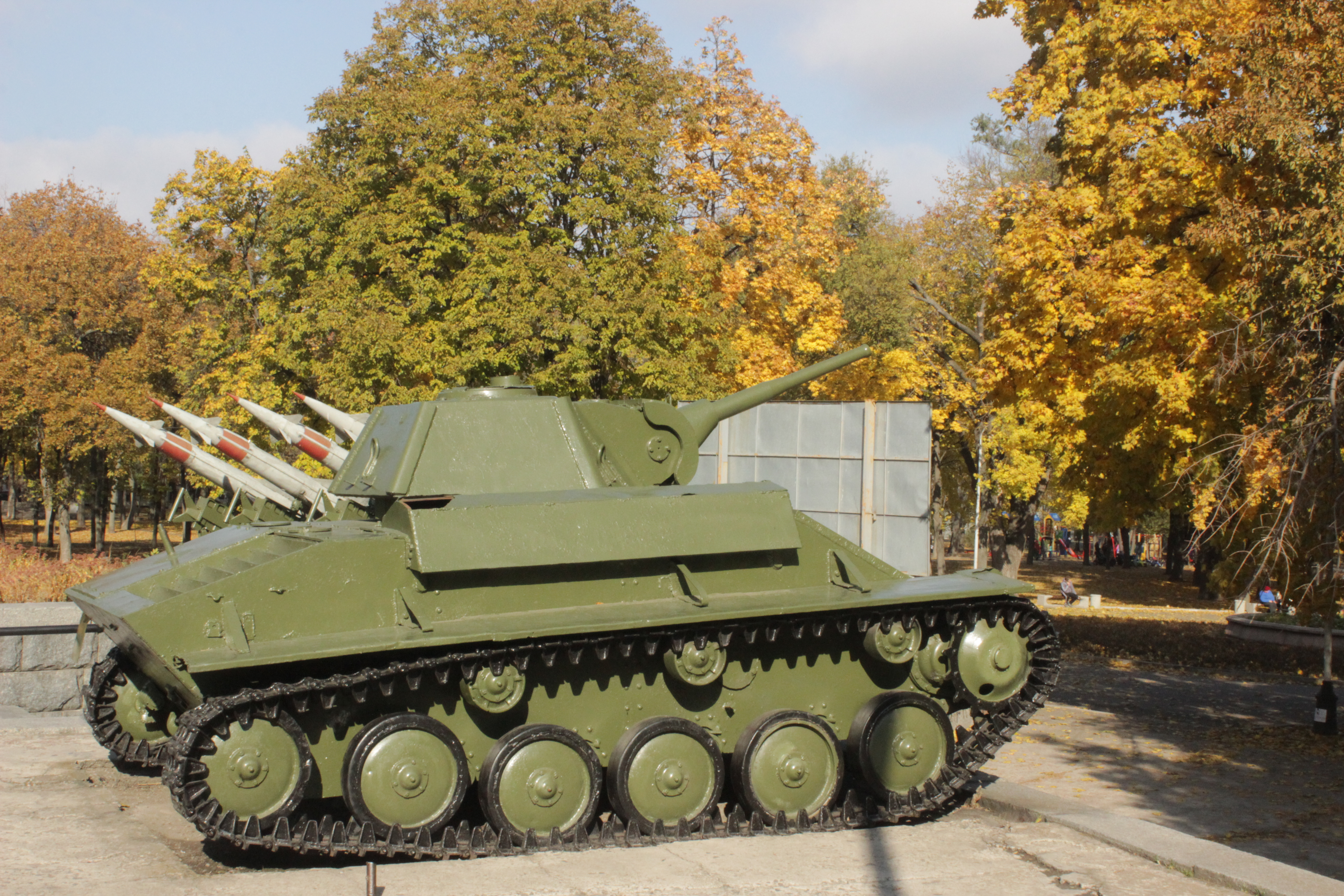
The museum's T-70 tank in 2015

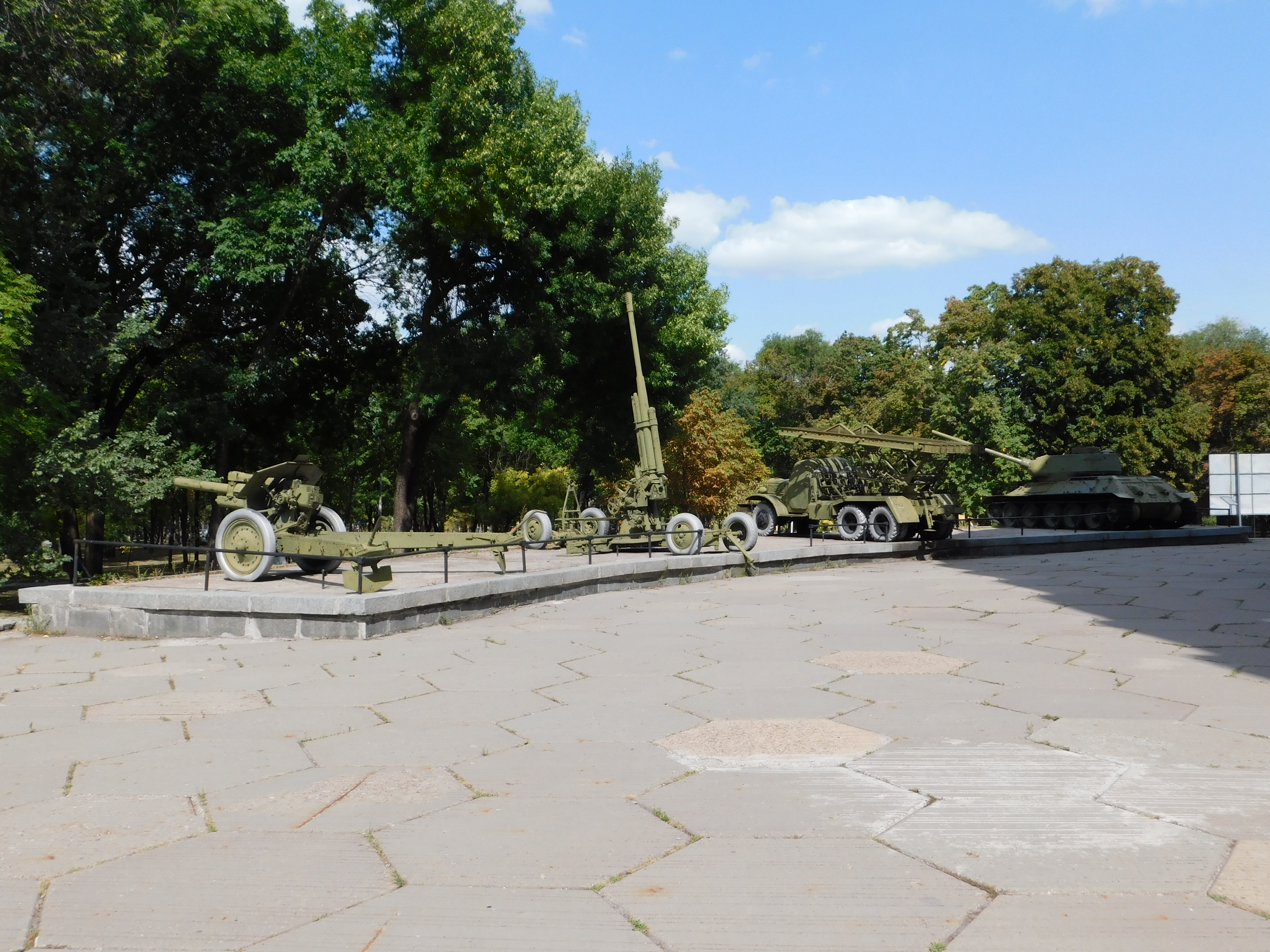
Soviet weaponry at the museum in 2019
