= Dmytro Yavornytsky National Historical Museum of Dnipro =

History museum in Ukraine

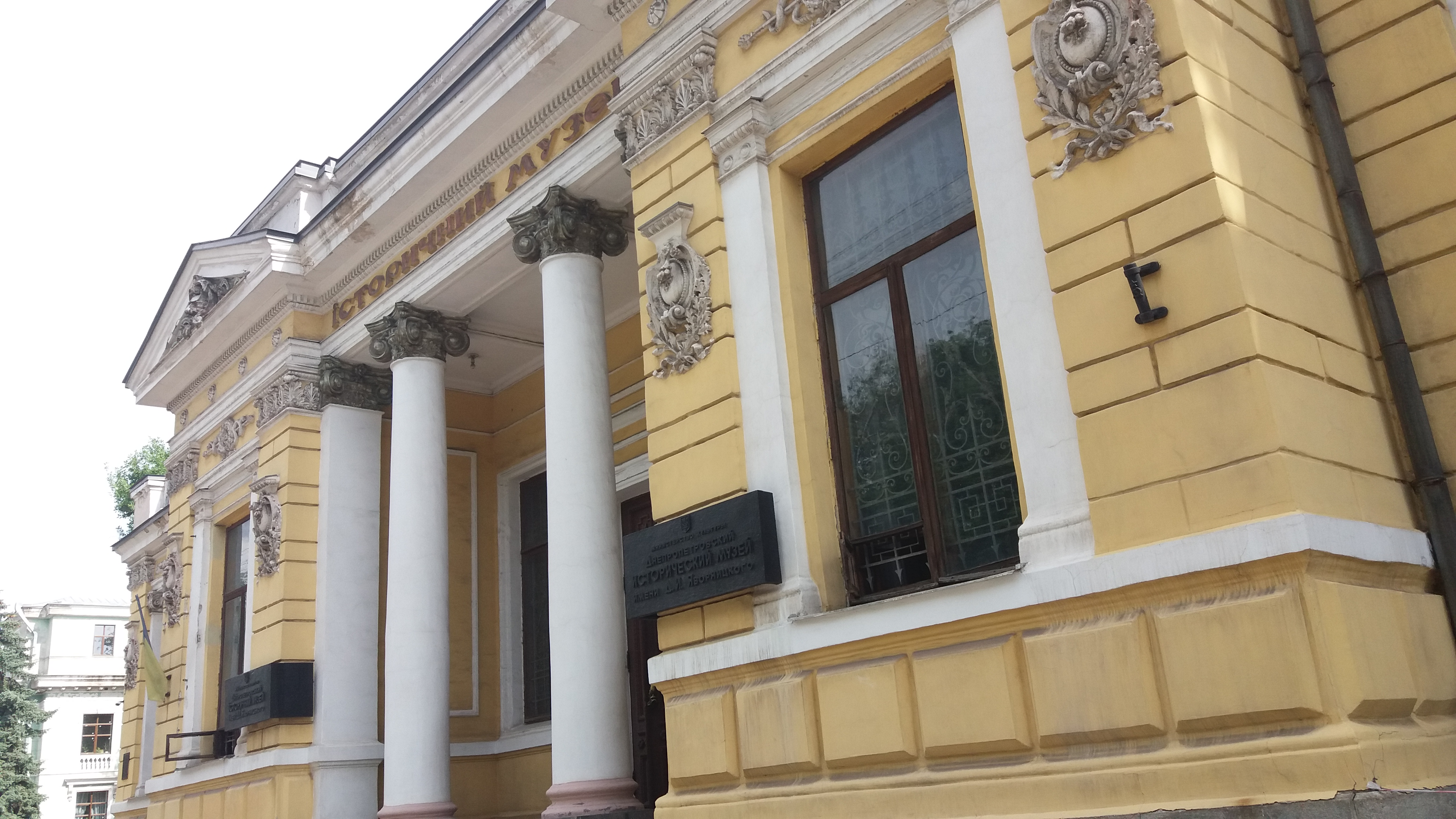
- Established: 1849; 177 years ago
- Coordinates: 48.45583°N 35.06389°E
- Collection size: approx. 283 thousand objects
- Directors: Pischanska J.V. (acting director, officially not assigned)
- Website: http://eng.museum.dp.ua/

Immovable Monument of National Significance of Ukraine
- Official name: Будинок історичного музею імені Д. І. Яворницького (Building of the Historical Museum named after D. I. Yavornytsky)
- Type: History
- Reference no.: 040001-Н

The Dmytro Yavornytsky National Historical Museum of Dnipro (Ukrainian: Дніпровський національний історичний музей імені Дмитра Яворницького, romanized: Dniprovskyi natsionalnyi istorychnyi muzei imeni Dmytra Yavornytskoho) is a museum, established in Dnipro (Ukraine) in 1848 by Andriy Fabr, local governor. Its permanent collection consists of 283 thousand objects from ancient Paleolithic implements to display units of World War II. Among its notable objects are the Kurgan stelae, Kernosivsky idol and vast collection of Cossack antiquities.

== History ==
=== Public Museum ===
In February 1848, the Katerinoslav Public Museum was founded. It was established on the initiative of Yakiv Grakhov, a principal of local gymnasium, and Andriy Fabr, a governor of Katerinoslav (modern Dnipro). Firstly, it was located in Potemkin Palace, that at the time belonged to the Province Gentry Assembly. During the Crimean War (1853–1856) it was located inside the Katerinoslav Classical Male Gymnasium (modern Dnipro State Medical Academy's building on the October Square), which served as its permanent location until the beginning of XX century.

Public Museum displayed archaeological findings, local antiquities, stone statues, relics of Ancient Egypt and Ancient Greece, coins, numerous samples of rocks, as well as paleontological remains. The mummy of a woman and her child was considered to be the most notable object, that is preserved in the museum to these days (under the legend, A. Fabr brought it there from Odessa Regional History Museum during the Crimean War (1853–1856)). The first decade from the time of its establishment was the most prolific period in the museum's history. The idea of a new museum inspired local residents and antiquity worshipers to make generous donations, which allowed to buy equipment and other acquirements, as well as to provide new display units to the museum.

Without the financial support from the government, the museum started to decay in 1860 – 1900.

=== Alexander Pol's Private Museum ===
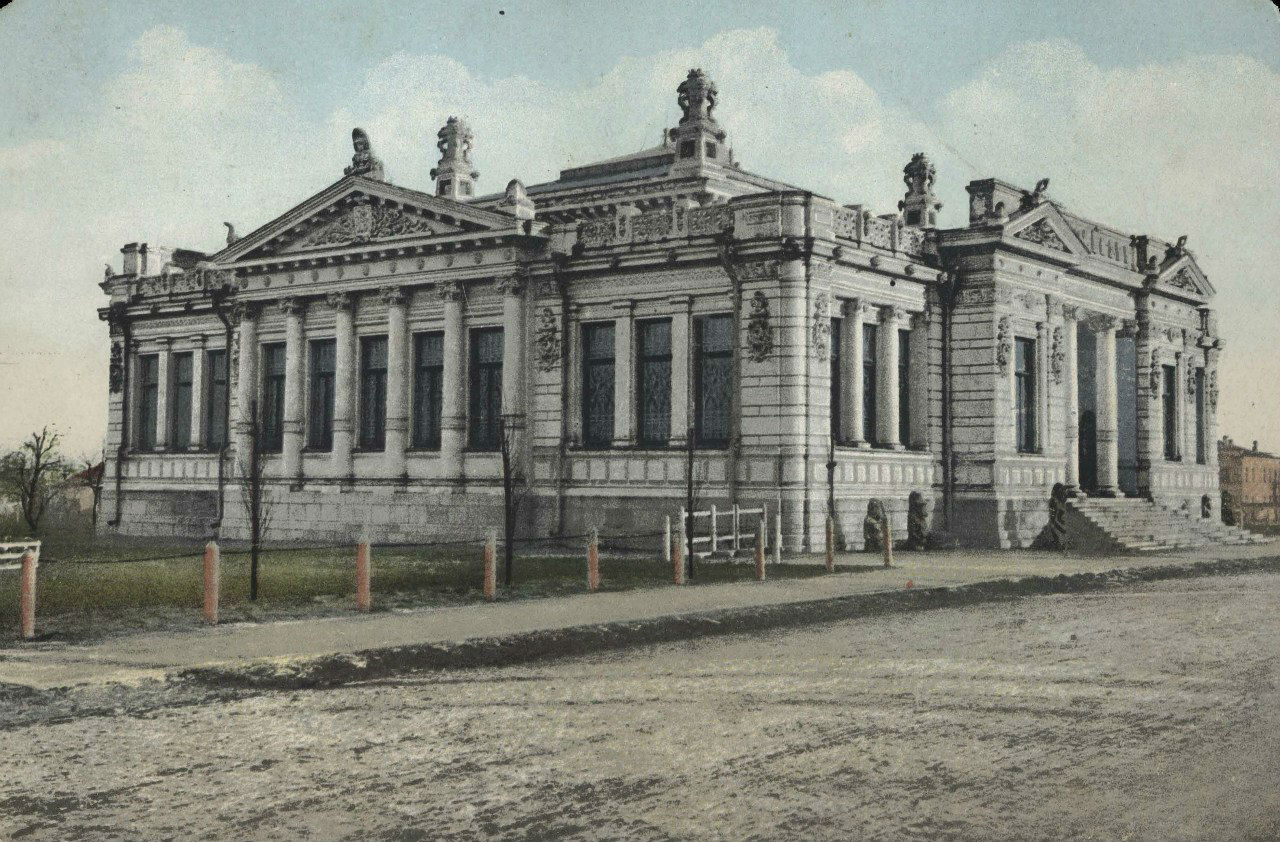
Alexander Pol's Museum (1910)

In 1887 Katerinoslavian freeman Alexander Pol established the first private museum in that region. It was located in his own four-room house in Soborna Square. Pol's collection consisted of 4770 units and was one of the biggest and most preeminent collections of that time.

Pol's museum was divided into seven divisions. Significant part of the display consisted of archaeological findings, which Pol discovered in Kurgans and burials within the Katerinoslav province. Displayed collection embraced a wide range of cossack's relics, Egyptian antiquities, cult objects, coins from all over the world and paintings. The museum offered a unique position of the keeper-guide. The owner estimated the worth of his collection for 200 thousand karbovanets in silver.

After Alexander Pol's death in 1890 local community initiated the establishment of Province Museum named after him.

=== Alexander Pol Province Museum ===
Alexander Pol Province Museum was solemnly established on 6 May 1902 in Merchant School's building (modern Dnipropetrovsk Oblast Council). The museum gradually accumulated units from the Public Museum's collection, that had been stored in Classical Gymnasium, collection of the Alexander Pol's Private Museum, Dmytro Yavornytsky's collection, etc. In 1905 under architectural supervision of G. K. Sandetzky and G.I. Panafutin a new museum building was constructed (Hofman's house in Berlin served as a model). During the first decade the number of displaying objects increased from 300 to 10000. The collection was divided into nine divisions, that displayed archaeological findings from different periods and cultures, Zaporizhian Cossack's relics, church antiquities, ethnographic and numismatic objects, paintings, applied arts, books and documents, photos.

=== Collection extension ===
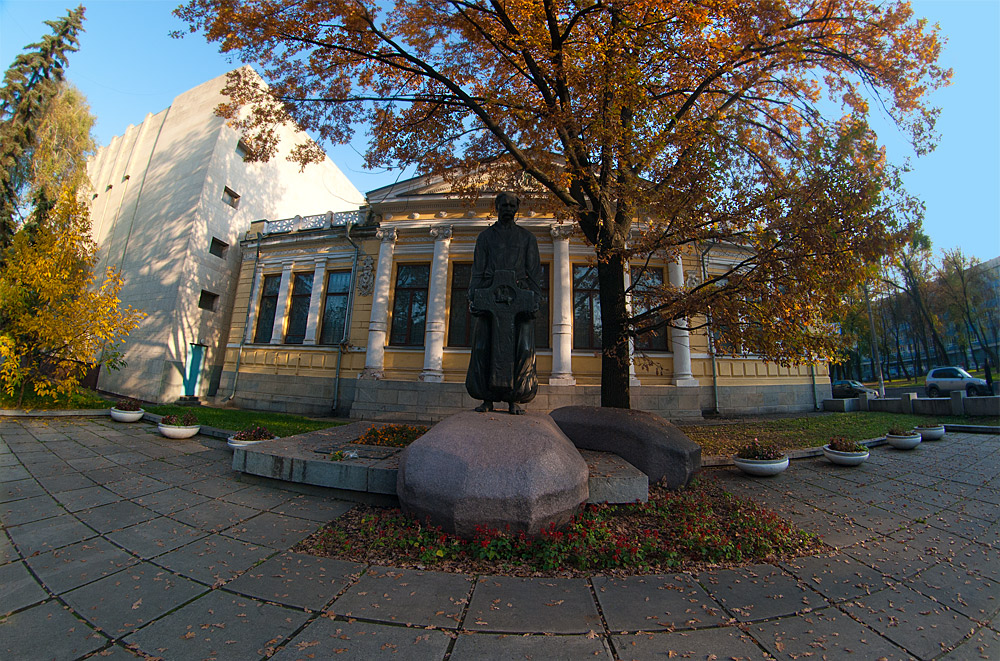
Dmytro Yavornytsky's tomb near the museum

In 1917 — 1923 the museum was enriched with private collections, objects from noblemen's houses, Zemsky's institutions. The director made efforts to preserve the museum's collection from destruction and plunder. At that time the museum was known by the name of People's Museum of Katerinoslavian Region.

In 1927 – 1932 museum to the great extend was enriched with new findings from Dnieprobudsk archaeological expedition, which was led by Dmytro Yavornytsky. The museum's collection was increased by thousands and thousand of new archaeological objects, that were found on the territory, where the Dnieper Hydroelectric Station was supposed to be constructed. At that time the museum was known by the name of Regional Historical Archaeological Museum of Dnipropetrovsk.

After Dmytro Yavornytsky's death in 1940 museum was named after him – Dmytro Yavornytsky Historical Museum of Dnipropetrovsk.

On 15 February 2010, the museum gained the "national" status.

=== World War II period and restoration process ===
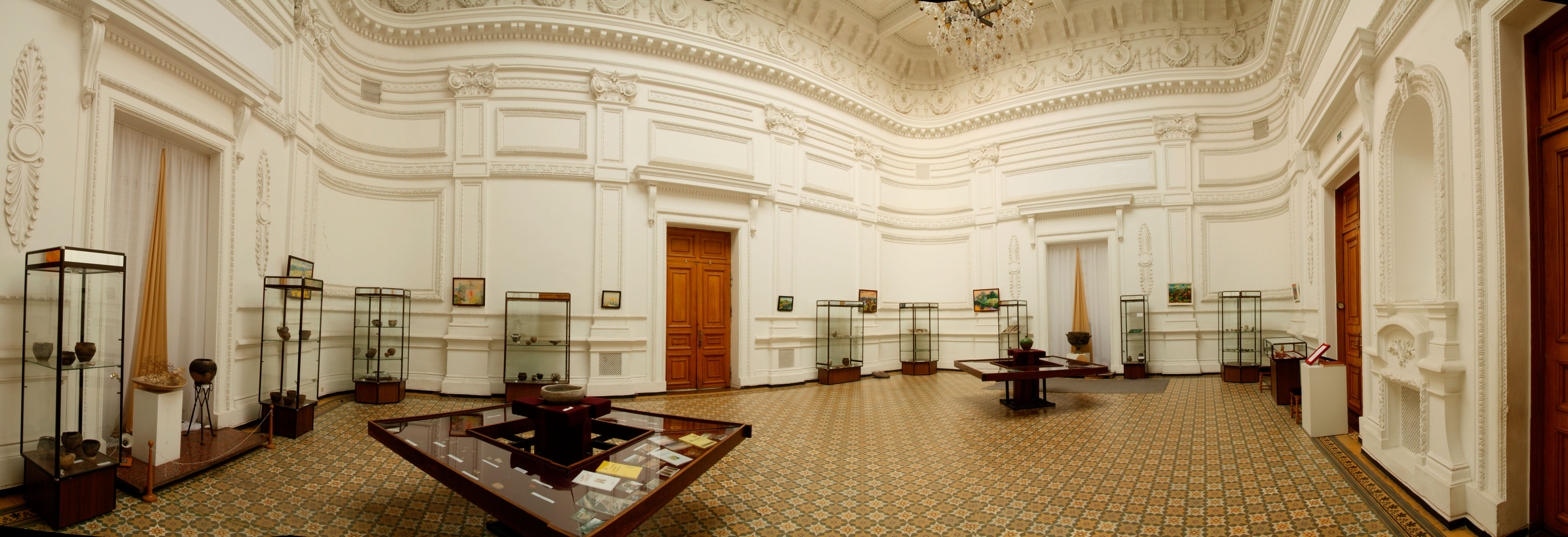
White Hall

During the World War II a large part of the museum's objects were lost. Since it was conveniently situated in the Central Avenue, commandant Klosterman decided to turn it into his headquarters, as all of the museum's objects were transferred to the Art Museum's building on T. Shevchenko St. One part of the museum's objects were evacuated to the east and eventually lost, while the other one was taken by Germans. However, technical workers M.Y. Bilyi and P. K. Duz' managed to rescue some objects.

In the 1970s the museum was restored under the directorship of Horpyna Vatchenko. In 1973 she enabled the acquisition and retention of the Kernosivsky idol. On 9 May 1975 a Diorama "Battle of the Dnieper" was opened and the following year the museum started a new exposition, that displayed the history of the region from ancient times to the end of WWII.

== Recent replenishment of museum funds ==
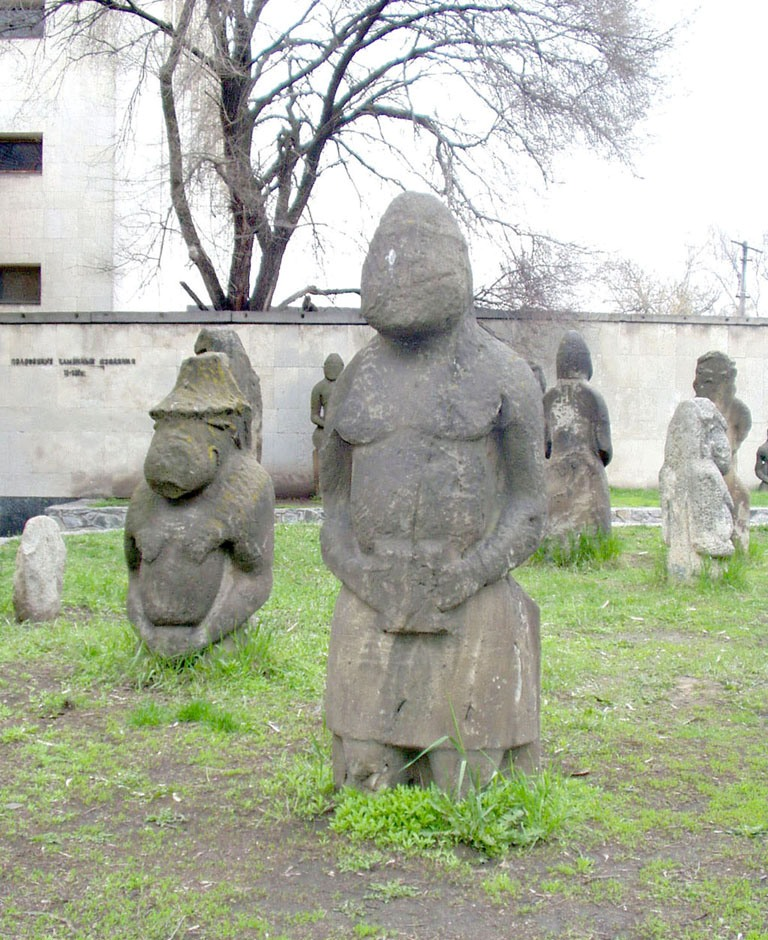
Kurgan stelae near the museum

In 1999 professor Anatoliy Fomenko donated to the museum his "Shevchenkoviana" collection, that consisted of nearly 2000 objects, including 230 books with Taras Shevchenko's writings, critical editions about the poet's life and works, a great deal of postcards, that depict Shevchenko's self-portraits, reproductions of his pictorial and graphic art, as well as postcards created to illustrate his poems, postcards that portray poet's monuments and places where he lived etc.; also emblems, medals, bookplates, philatelic objects and portraits etc. Among its most valuable pieces are 1860 "Kobzar" edition printed during the poet's lifetime under the patronage of Platon Symyrenko, 1867 Prague edition of "Kobzar", collected volume "Taras Shevchenko's poems forbidden in Russia" (published in Geneva in 1890).

== Museum Exposition ==
Nowadays the museum exposition is divided into 9 halls:

- Ancient History of Dnipropetrovsk Region;
- Zaporozhian Cossacks;
- Industrial Revolution in the late 18th – early 19th century;
- Civil War (1917 – 1920);
- The Region during 1920 – 1939;
- The Region during WWII (1939 – 1945);
- Modern History of Dnipropetrovsk Region (1945 – the present time) – today is undergoing some major reexposition and rebuilding;
- "Never to be Repeated Again" (Stalinist Terror in Dnipropetrovsk during 1930 – 1950) .
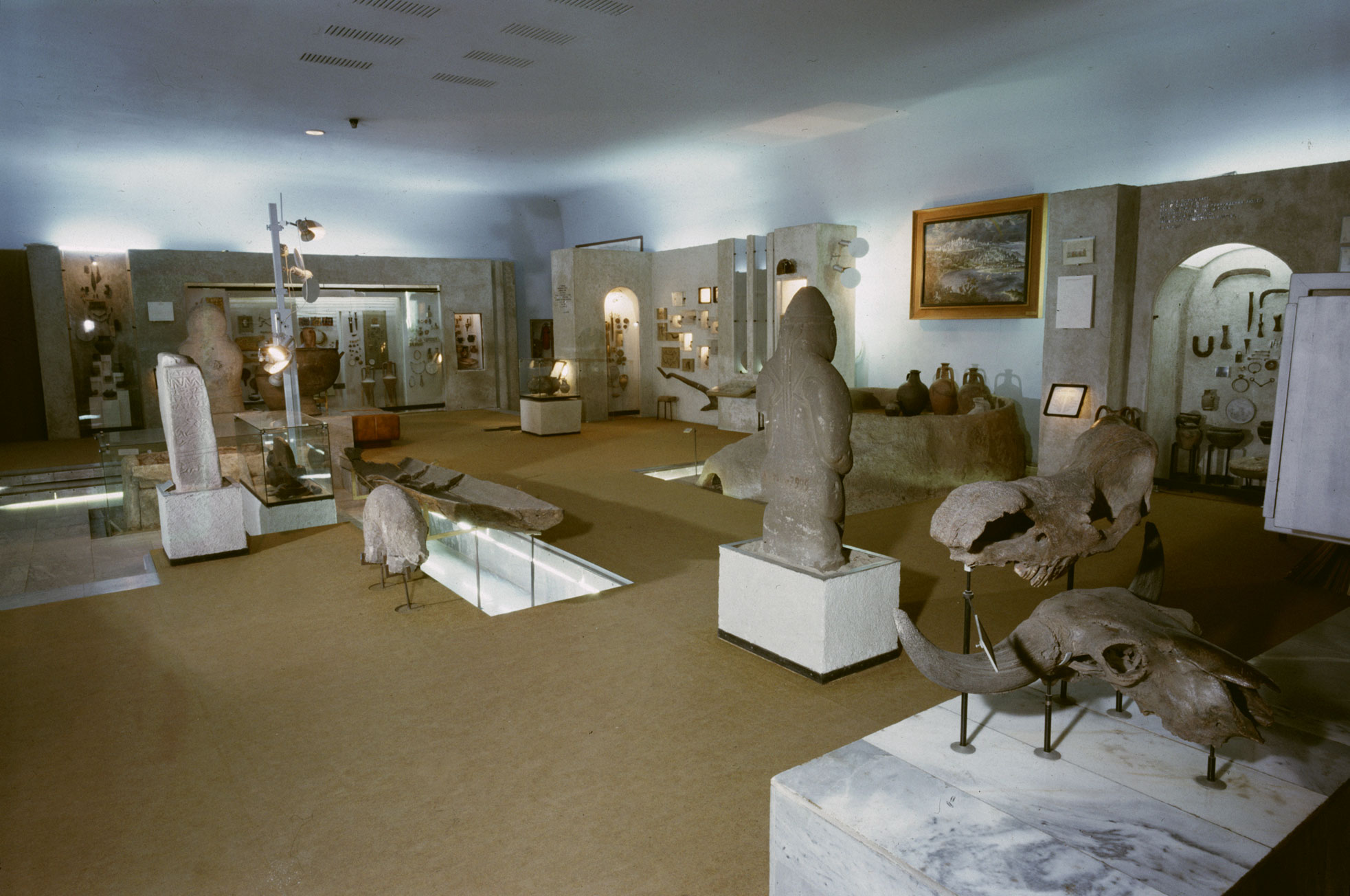
Hall 1

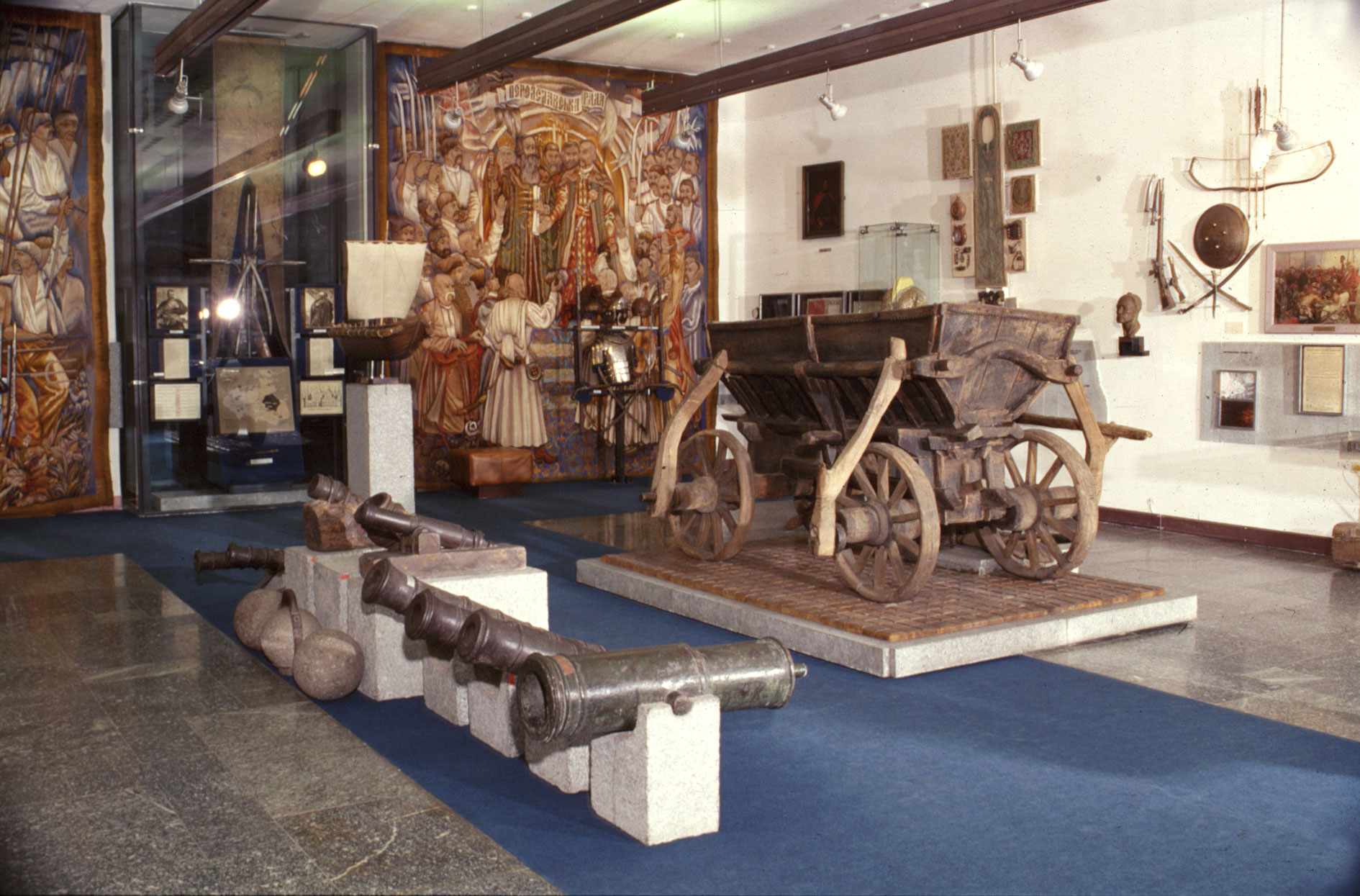
Hall 2

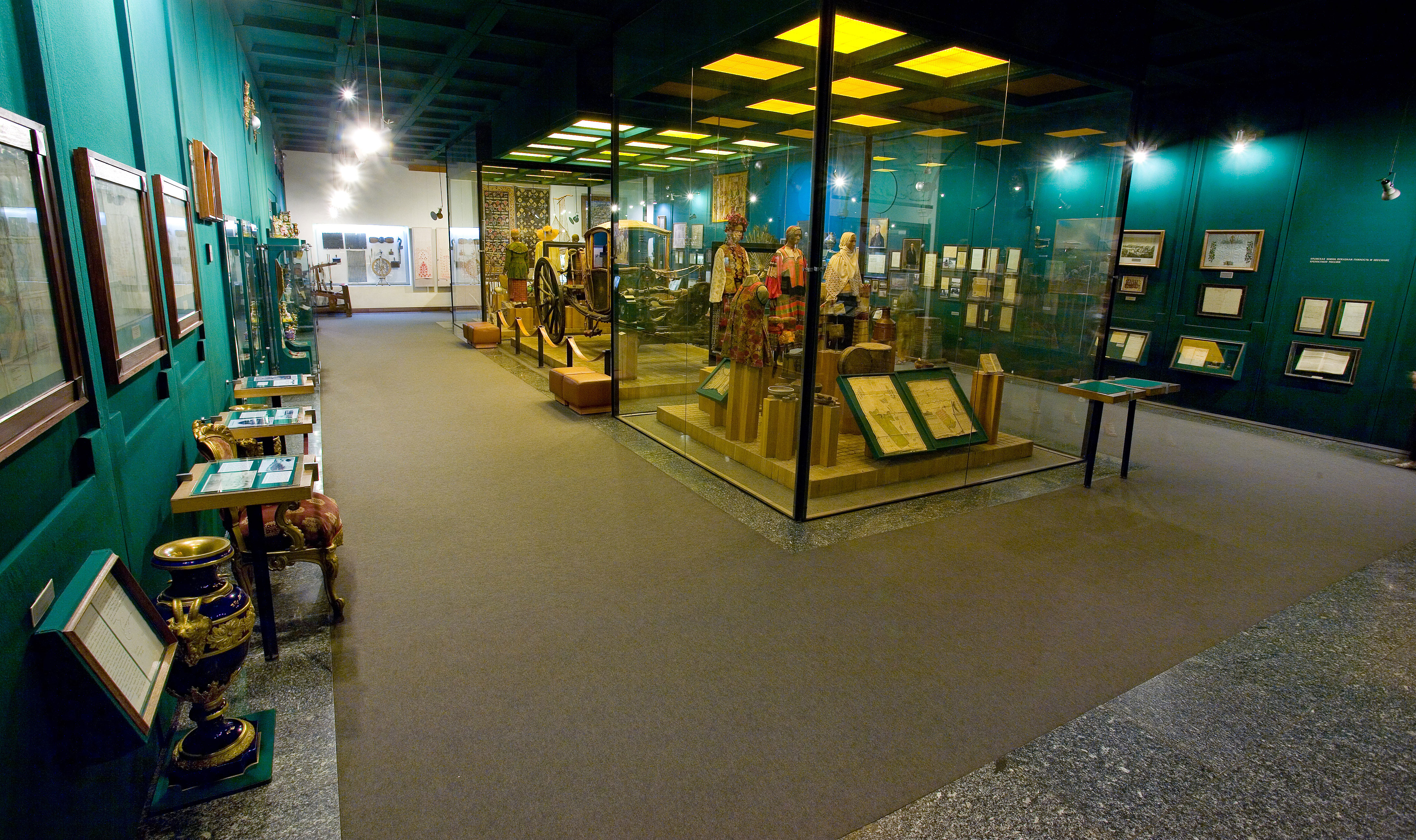
Hall 3

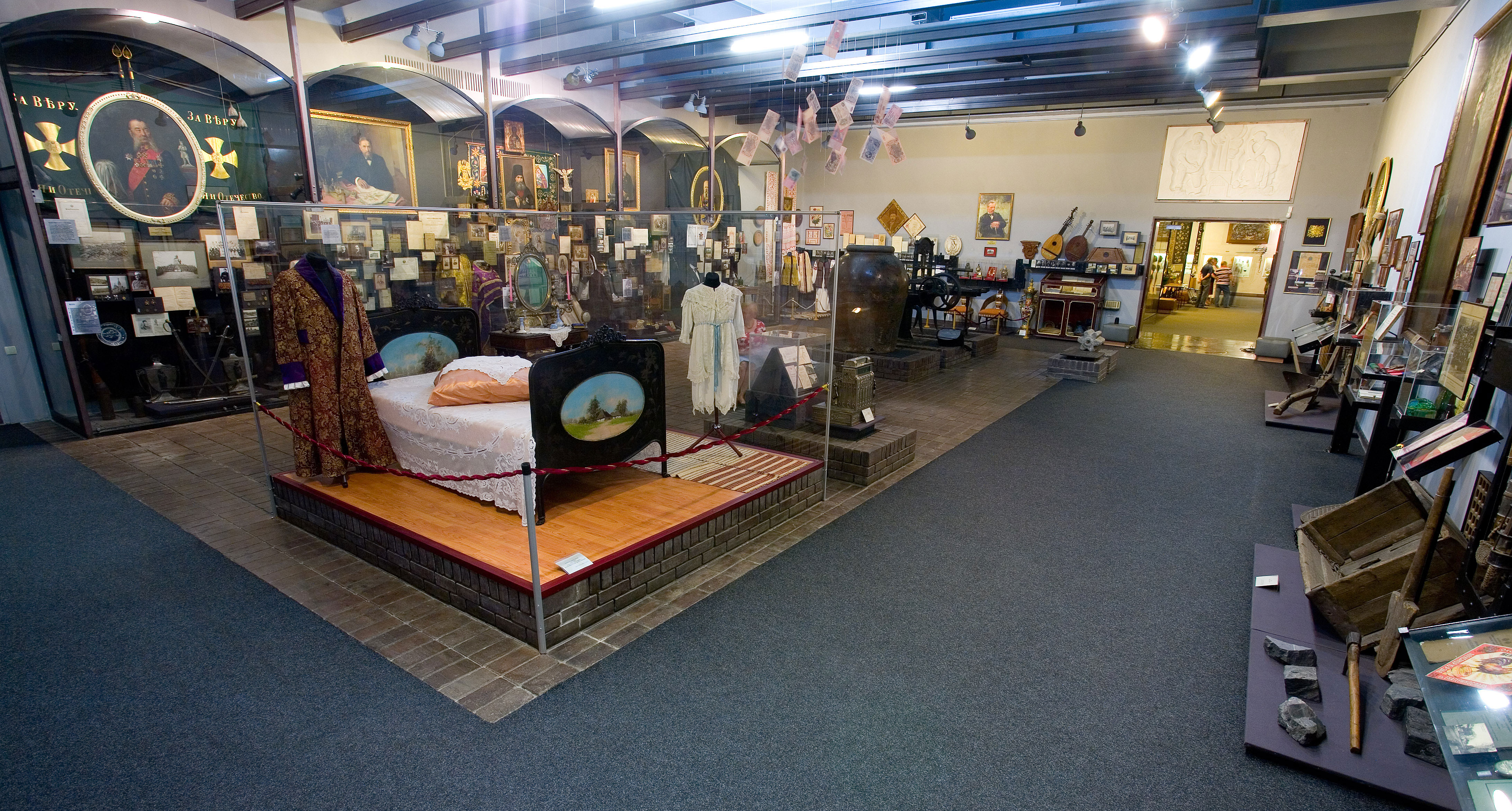
Hall 4

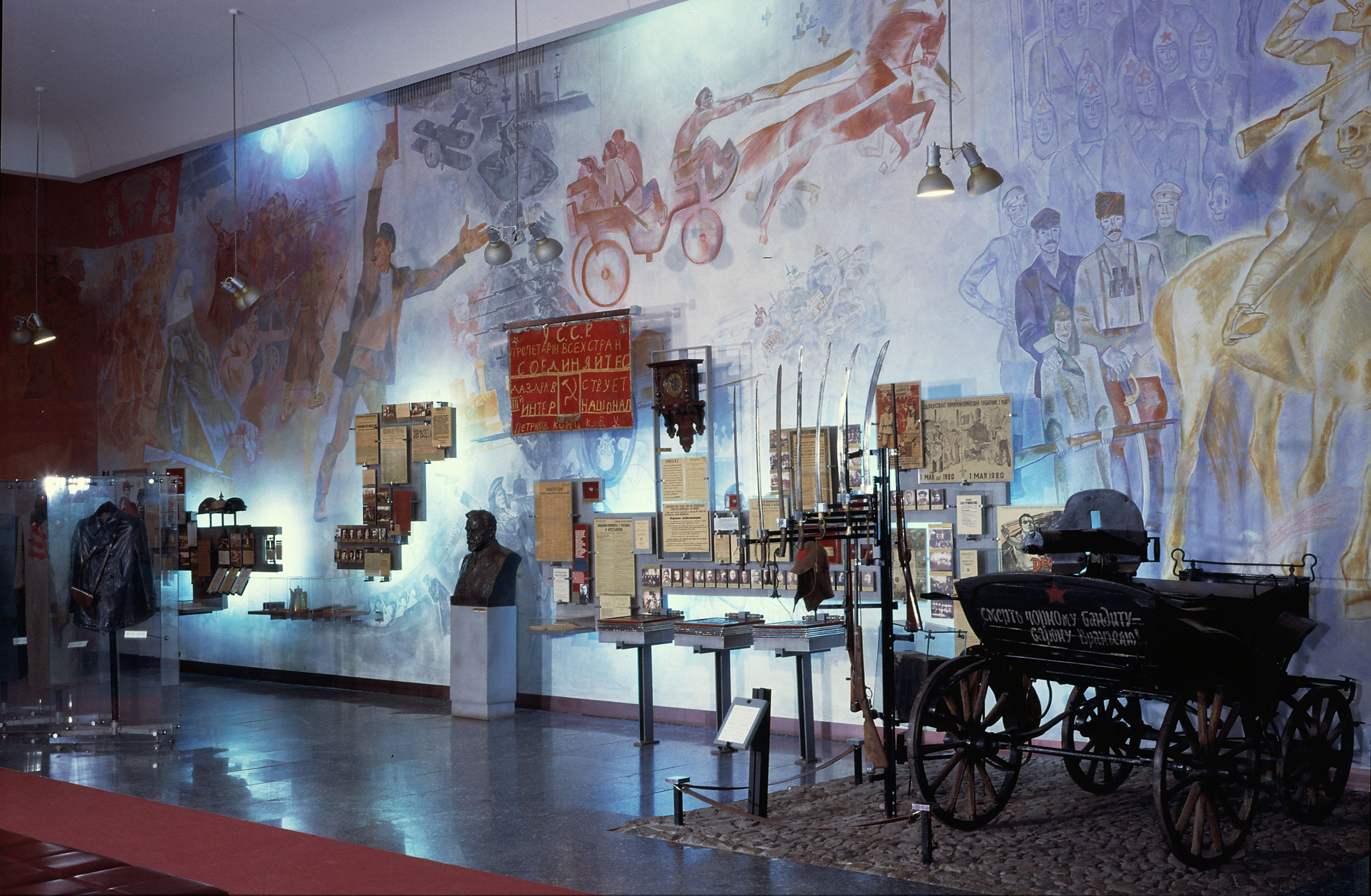
Hall 5

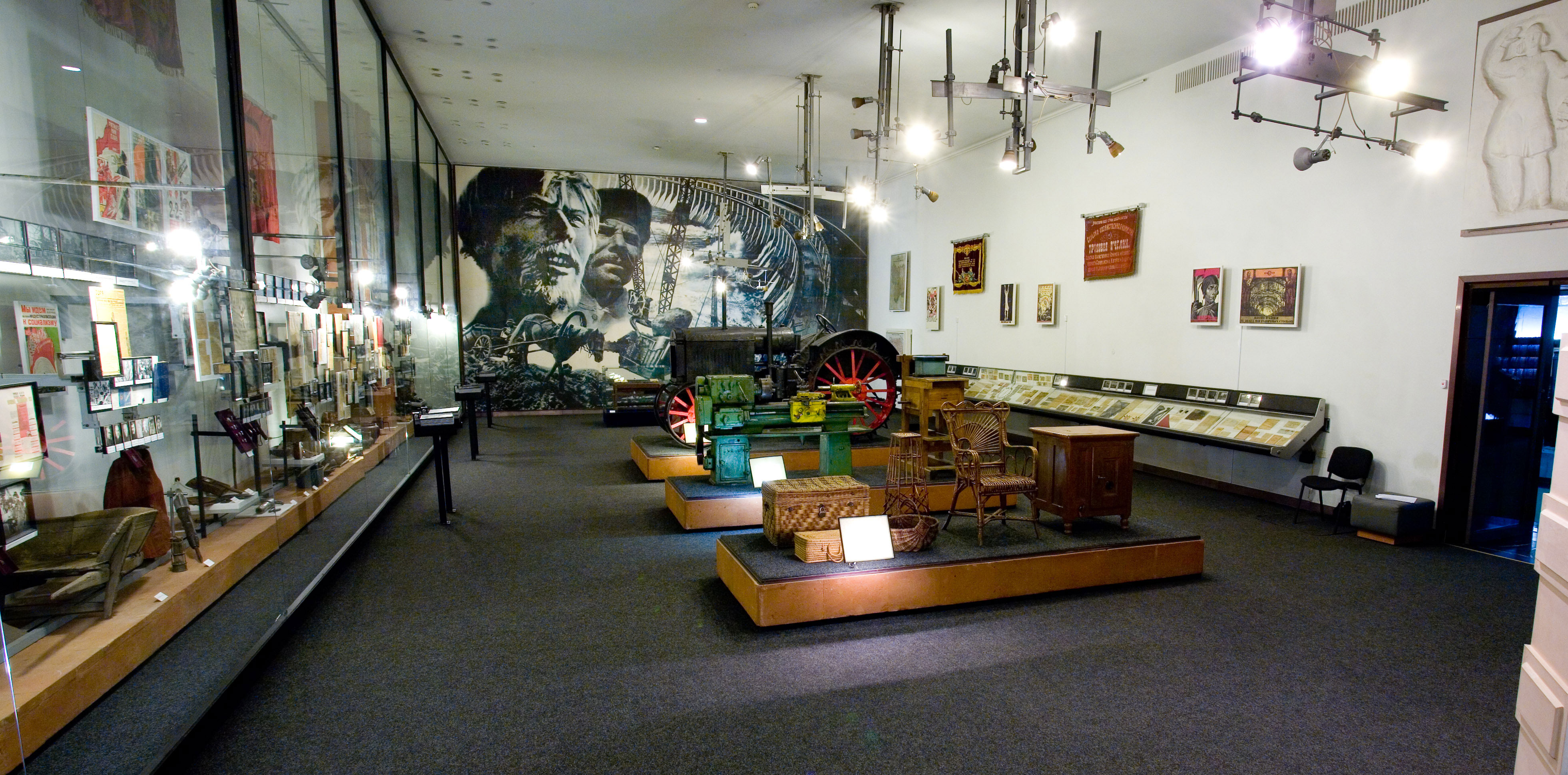
Hall 6

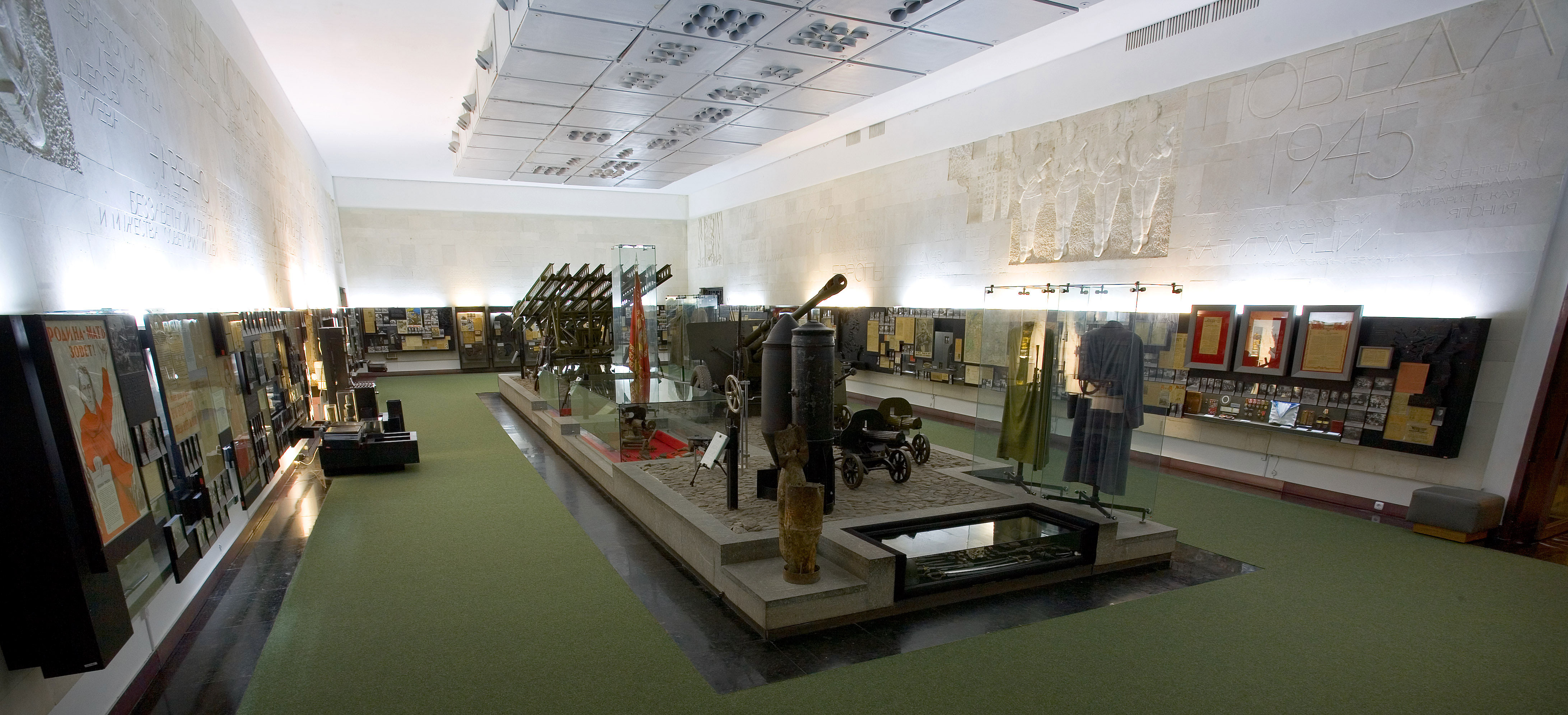
Hall 7

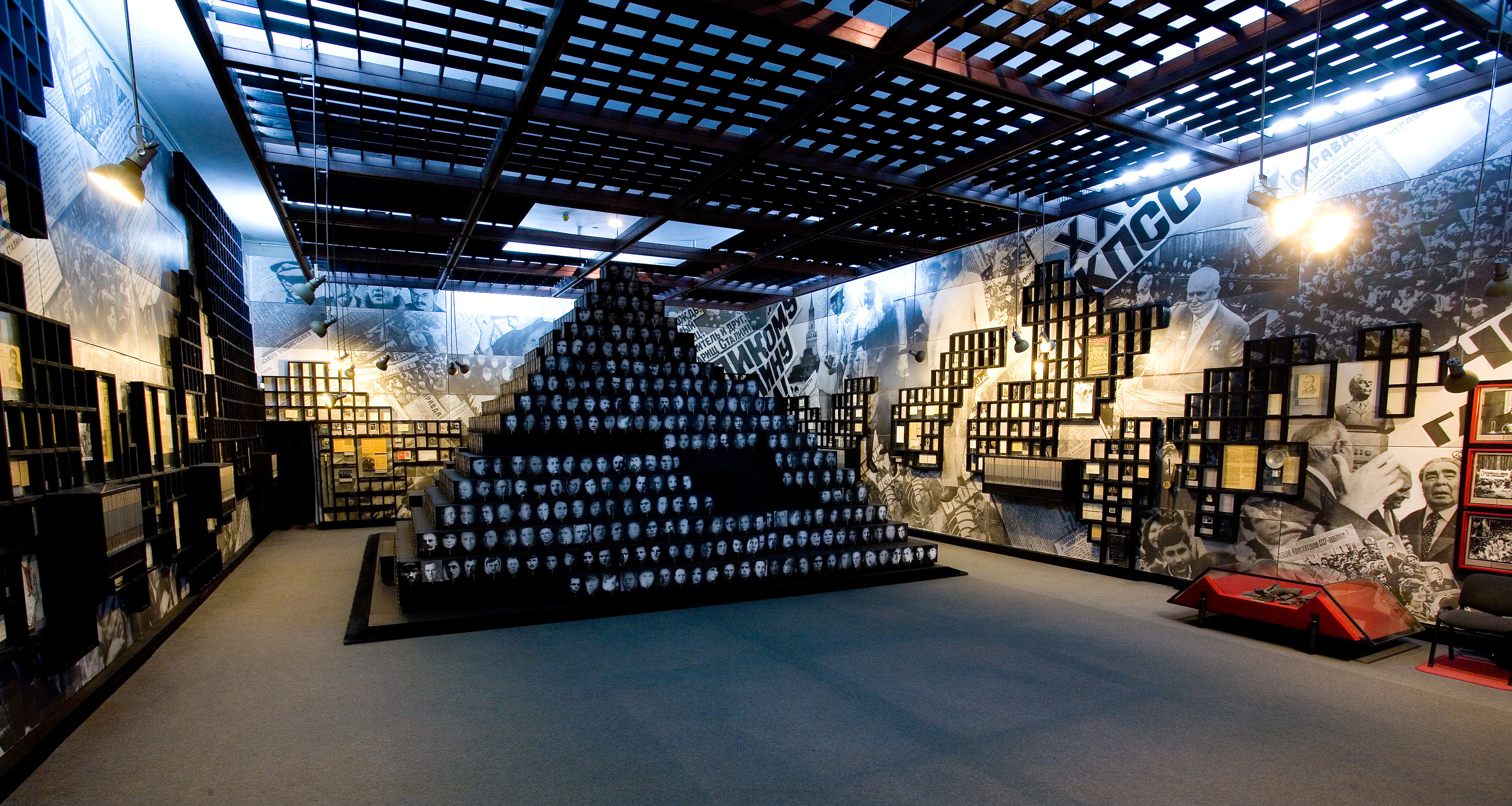
Hall 9
