= List of Dnipro Metro stations =

Map of the Dnipro Metro

The Dnipro Metro consists of one 7.8-kilometer (4.8 mi) line and just 6 stations, making it one of the smallest metro systems in the world. The line starts at Vokzalna station, near the city's central railway station in the east and ends at Pokrovska station in the western part of the city. A three-station extension east has been under construction, but the work is currently on pause. Ridership on the metro has steadily declined since its opening in 1995. In 2013, the metro carried 7.51 million passengers compared to 18.2 million in 1995. Initially, the metro trains carried five train cars each, but as the passenger ridership declined, the number of cars was reduced to three.

== Stations ==
Stations of the Dnipro Metro
Name	Name (in Ukrainian) (Note: Links to Ukrainian Wikipedia articles for each station.)	Photo	Opened	Type
Pokrovska	Покровська	Underground station with brown floor and walls and white ceiling and columns	29 December 1995	Shallow column
Prospekt Svobody	Проспект Свободи	Underground station with a teal tiled ceiling	29 December 1995	Single-vault
Zavodska	Заводська	Underground station with a blue tiled ceiling	29 December 1995	Single-vault
Metalurhiv	Металургів	Underground station with a yellow tiled ceiling	29 December 1995	Single-vault
Metrobudivnykiv	Метробудівників	Underground station with a pink tiled ceiling	29 December 1995	Single-vault
Vokzalna	Вокзальна	Underground station with a brown floor and white columns and ceiling	29 December 1995	Deep column

=== Future stations ===
Stations of the Dnipro Metro under construction
Name	Name (in Ukrainian)	Photo	Status	Type
Teatralna	Театральна	Construction site	Construction unfinished and paused	Deep column
Tsentralna	Центральна	Construction site	Construction unfinished and paused	Pylon
Muzeina	Музейна	Future construction site next to a road	Construction unfinished and paused	Deep column

== See also ==
- List of Kharkiv Metro stations
- List of Kyiv Metro stations
