= Metalurhiv (Dnipro Metro) =

Station of the Dnipro Metro

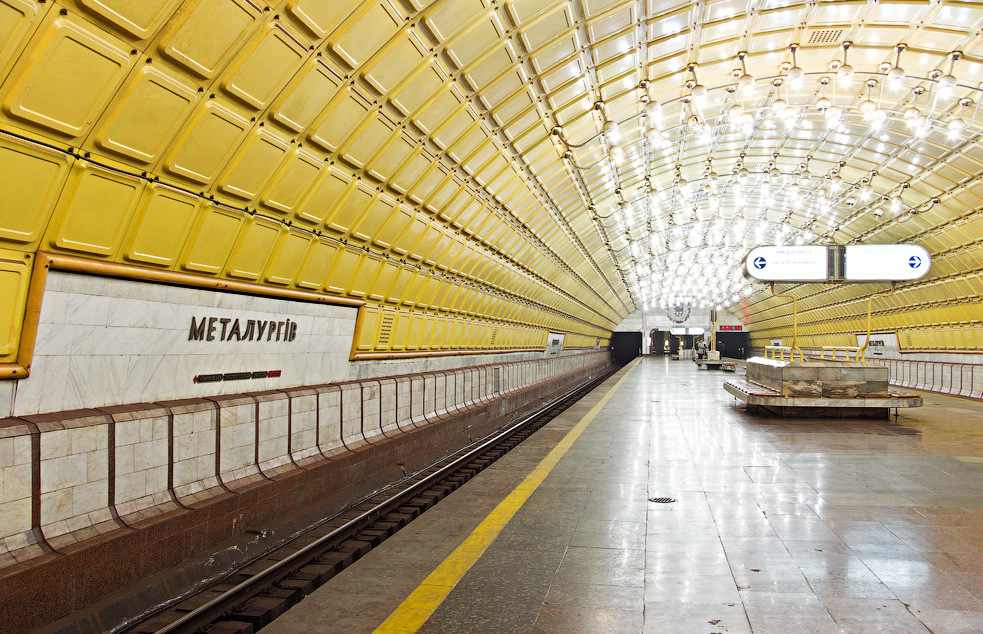
- Station Hall

General information
- Coordinates: 48°28′35.75″N 34°58′45.44″E
- System: Dnipro Metro Station
- Owner: Dnipro Metro
- Line: Tsentralno–Zavodska line
- Platforms: 1
- Tracks: 2

Construction
- Structure type: underground
- Platform levels: 1

History
- Opened: 29 December 1995

Services
Preceding station	Dnipro Metro	Following station
Zavodska towards Pokrovska	Tsentralno–Zavodska line	Metrobudivnykiv towards Vokzalna
Location

Metalurhiv (Ukrainian: Металургів) is a station on Dnipro Metro's Tsentralno–Zavodska Line. It is a single-vault deep subway station, accessible only by an escalator and was opened on 29 December 1995 along with the rest of the system's first stations. The station is located on the Serhiy Nigoyan Avenue, near the Organ music centre. The station is named Metalurhiv for the steel-makers of the city and metallurgical plant located nearby.
