= Metrobudivnykiv (Dnipro Metro) =

Station of the Dnipro Metro

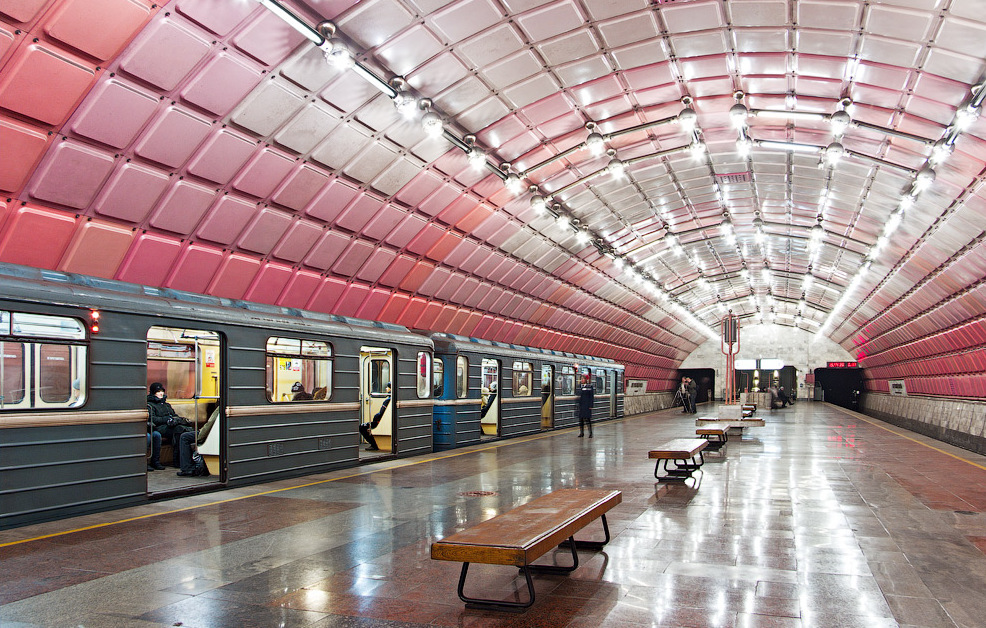

General information
- Coordinates: 48°28′31.38″N 34°59′43.53″E
- System: Dnipro Metro Station
- Owner: Dnipro Metro
- Line: Tsentralno–Zavodska line
- Platforms: 1
- Tracks: 2

Construction
- Structure type: underground
- Platform levels: 1

History
- Opened: 29 December 1995

Services
Preceding station	Dnipro Metro	Following station
Metalurhiv towards Pokrovska	Tsentralno–Zavodska line	Vokzalna Terminus
Location

Metrobudivnykiv (Ukrainian: Метробудівників) is a station on Dnipro Metro's Tsentralno–Zavodska Line. It is a single-vault deep subway station, accessible by escalator and was opened on 29 December 1995. The station has a total of 3 exits, each of which leads to the corner of Serhiy Nigoyan Avenue and Ivan Mazepa Avenue. The station is named Metrobudivnykiv for the subway builders of the city.
