= Zavodska (Dnipro Metro) =

Station of the Dnipro Metro

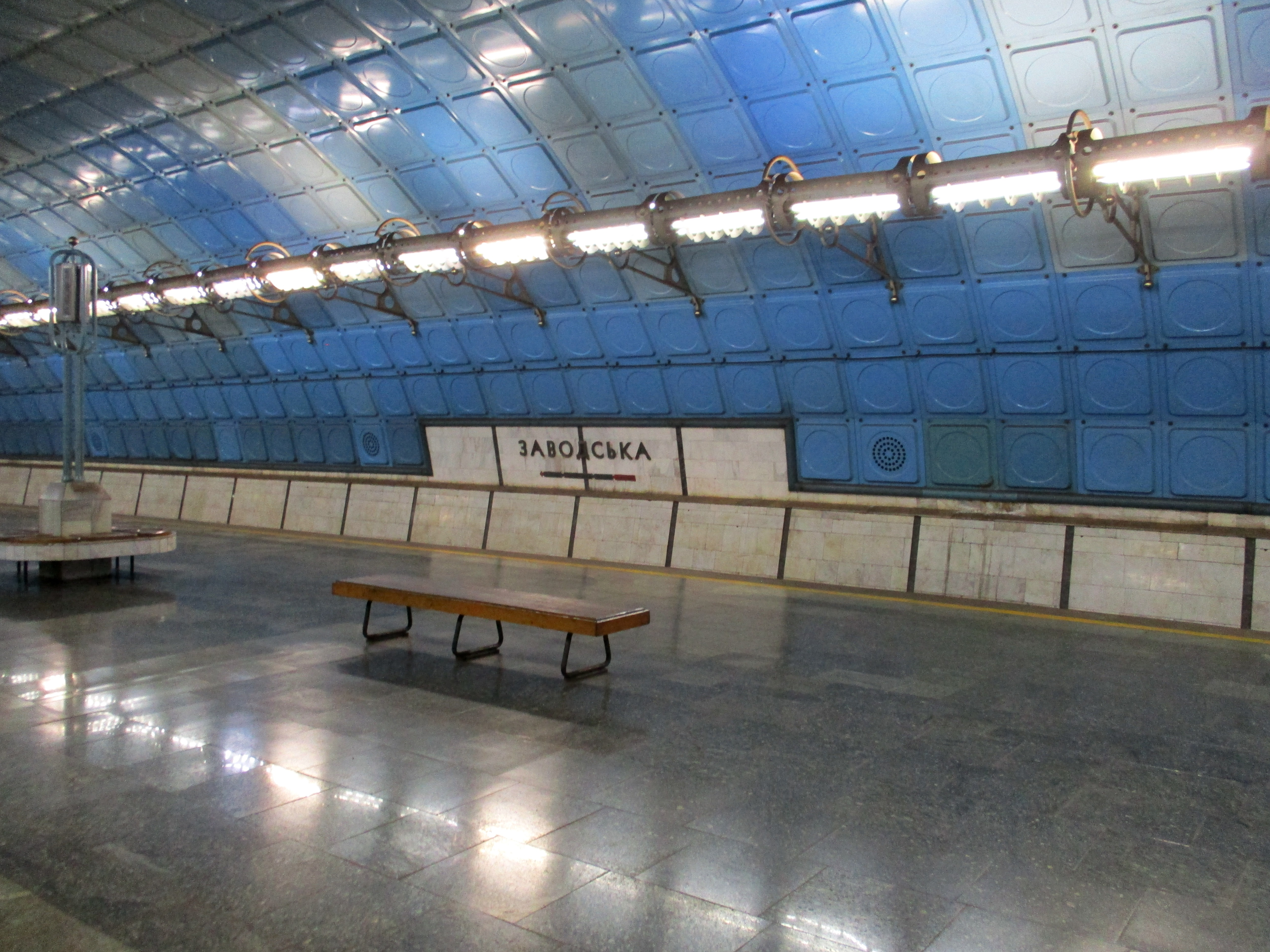
- Station Hall

General information
- Coordinates: 48°28′33.07″N 34°57′41.88″E
- System: Dnipro Metro Station
- Owner: Dnipro Metro
- Line: Tsentralno–Zavodska line
- Platforms: 1
- Tracks: 2

Construction
- Structure type: underground
- Platform levels: 1

History
- Opened: 29 December 1995

Services
Preceding station	Dnipro Metro	Following station
Prospekt Svobody towards Pokrovska	Tsentralno–Zavodska line	Metalurhiv towards Vokzalna
Location

Zavodska (Ukrainian: Заводська) is a station on Dnipro Metro's Tsentralno–Zavodska Line. It is a single-vault deep subway station, accessible only by an escalator and was opened on 29 December 1995 along with the rest of the system's first stations. The station is located on the Zakhidnyi Shliakh Street. The station is named Zavodska, for the numerous factories and plants located alongside.
