= Vokzalna =

Vokzalna (Ukrainian: Вокзальна) may mean:

- Vokzalna (Kyiv Metro), a station on the Kyiv Metro.
- Vokzalna (Dnipropetrovsk Metro), a station on the Dnipropetrovsk Metro.
