= Prospekt Svobody (Dnipro Metro) =

Station of the Dnipro Metro

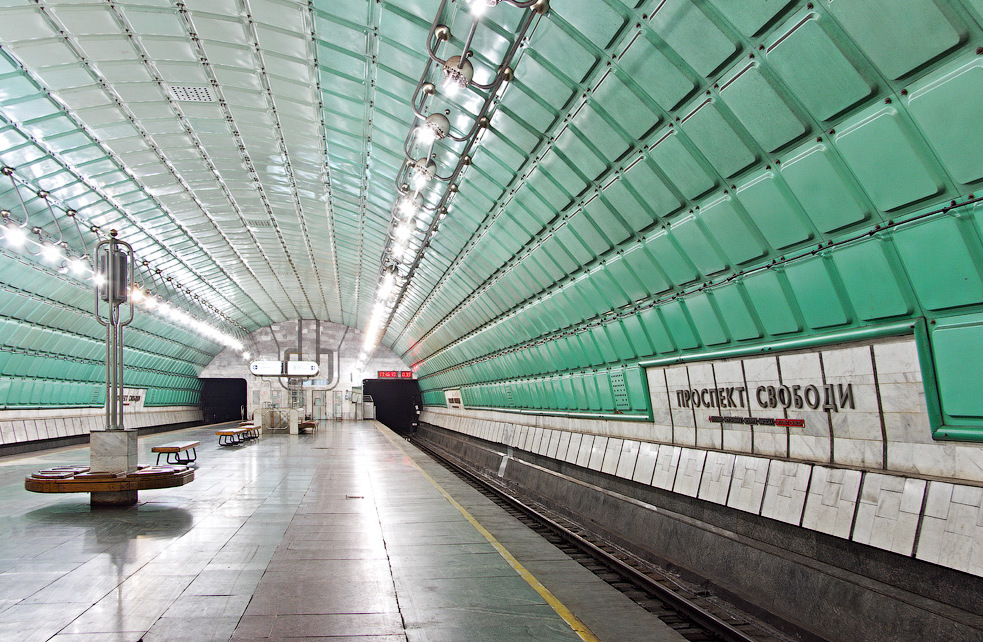
- Station Hall

General information
- Coordinates: 48°28′48.43″N 34°56′34.2″E
- System: Dnipro Metro Station
- Owner: Dnipro Metro
- Line: Tsentralno–Zavodska line
- Platforms: 1
- Tracks: 2

Construction
- Structure type: underground
- Platform levels: 1

History
- Opened: 29 December 1995

Services
Preceding station	Dnipro Metro	Following station
Pokrovska Terminus	Tsentralno–Zavodska line	Zavodska towards Vokzalna
Location

Prospekt Svobody (Ukrainian: Проспект Свободи) is a station on Dnipro Metro's Tsentralno–Zavodska Line. It is a single-vault deep subway station, accessible only by an escalator and was opened on 29 December 1995 along with the rest of the system's first stations. The station is located on the Novokodatska Square on the Prospekt Svobody (lit. 'Freedom Avenue').
