= Teatralna (Dnipro Metro) =

Railway station in Dnipro, Ukraine

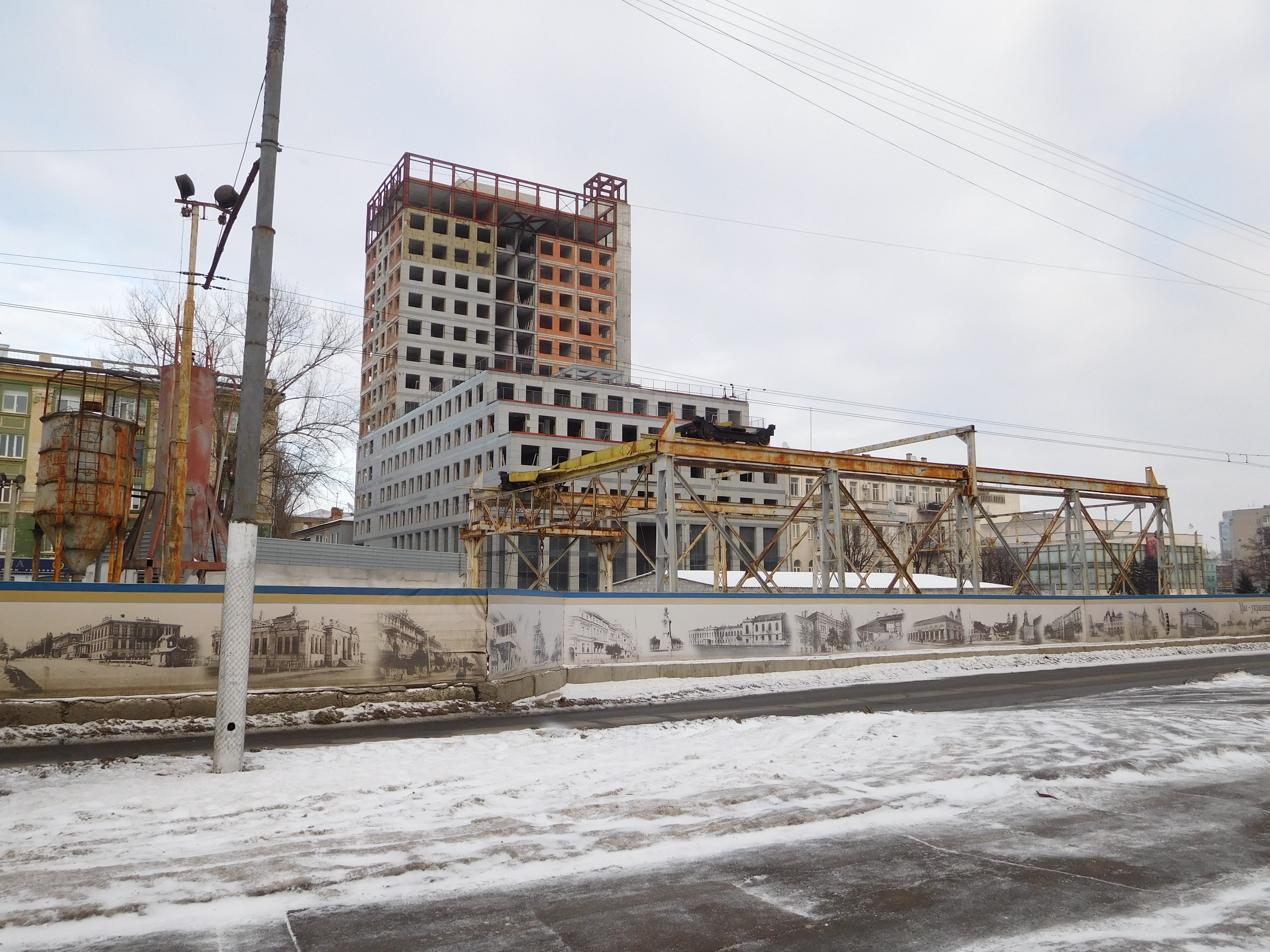
- Site of future station, January 2017

General information
- Coordinates: 48°28′32″N 35°00′57″E
- System: Dnipro Metro Station
- Owner: Dnipro Metro
- Line: Tsentralno–Zavodska line

Construction
- Structure type: Underground, single-vault station

History
- Opening: unknown

Services
Preceding station	Dnipro Metro	Following station
Vokzalna towards Pokrovska	Tsentralno–Zavodska line	Tsentralna towards Muzeina
Location

Teatralna (Ukrainian: Театральна) is a station currently under construction on the Dnipro Metro's Tsentralno–Zavodska Line. The station is named for its proximity next to the Dnipro Academic Drama and Comedy Theatre and the Dnipro Opera and Ballet Theatre.

== History ==
The station was already envisioned in the 1980 official planning of the city's metro lines. It was originally scheduled to be opened in 1993 as Park Chkalova (Ukrainian: Парк Чкалова) (Note: In 1993 this park was renamed Lasar Hloba Park (Ukrainian: Парк Лазаря Глоби).) (the 1980 plans referred to the station as "Teatralna"), the station's construction was delayed significantly after the fall of the Soviet Union. Budget issues and economic instability in Ukraine further delayed the station's opening.

As an expansion of the current Dnipro Metro the station was projected to be opened by 2015. But construction was stopped because the tender to select the contractor was stopped by the city council in August 2015.

Deputy Mayor of Dnipro Mykhailo Lysenko stated in December 2020 that the station was estimated to be opened in 2024.

The February 2022 full-scale Russian invasion of Ukraine stopped all work on the expansion of Dnipro metro.

The station is located deep underground in the center of Dnipro, and is located right after the line's current terminus, Vokzalna, and Tsentralna, another station currently under construction. In 2014 it was not known what final form the station would take on; whether it would be a deep column or a single-vault station. The station will be of the single-vault type.
