= Tsentralna (Dnipro Metro) =

Railway station in Dnipro, Ukraine

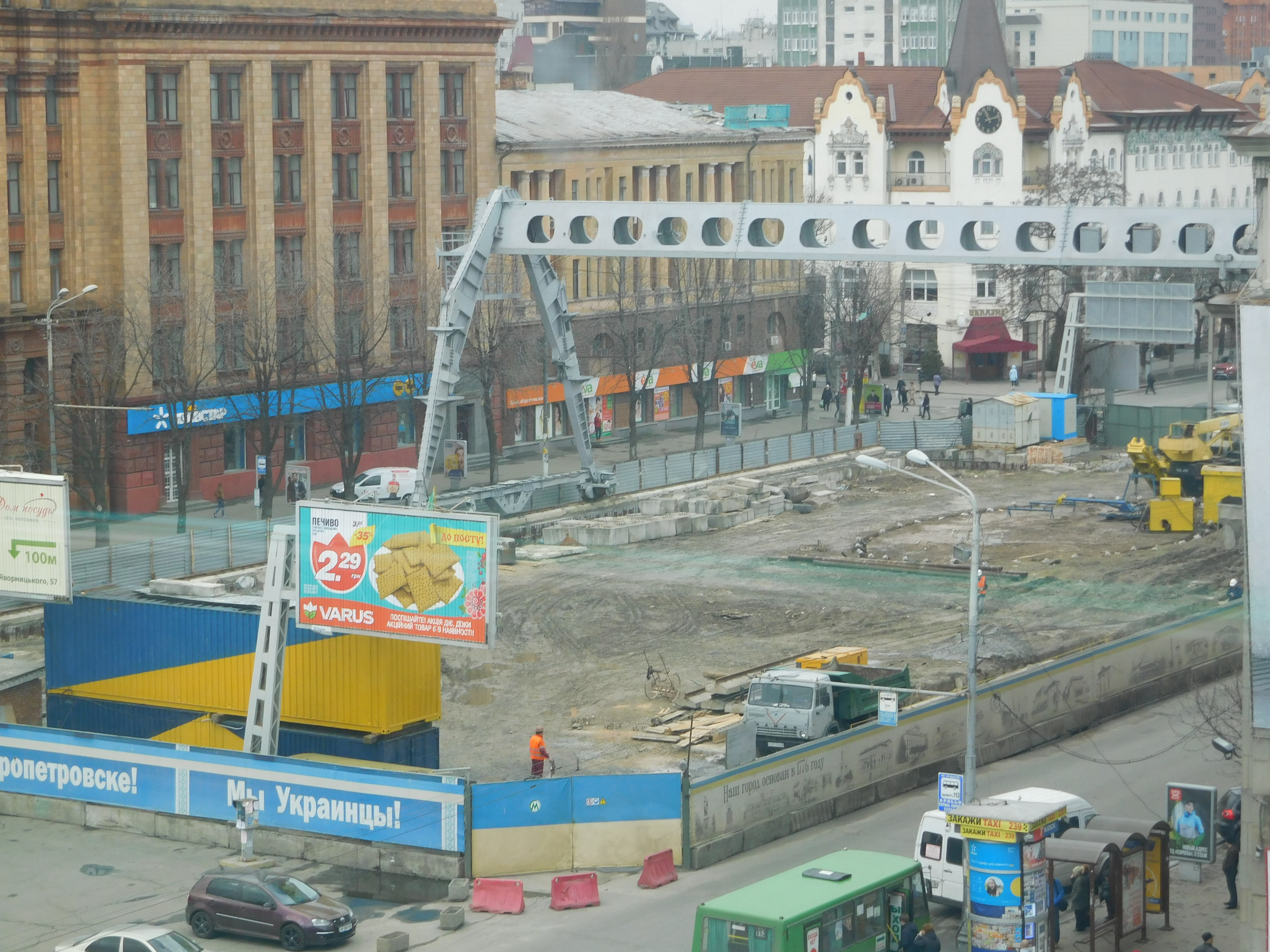
- Site of future escalator shaft, March 2017

General information
- Coordinates: 48°28′32″N 35°00′57″E
- System: Dnipro Metro Station
- Owner: Dnipro Metro
- Line: Tsentralno–Zavodska line

Construction
- Structure type: Underground

History
- Opened: unknown

Services
| Preceding station | Dnipro Metro | Following station |
|---|---|---|
| Teatralna towards Pokrovska | Tsentralno–Zavodska line | Muzeina Terminus |
Location

Tsentralna (Ukrainian: Центральна) is a station currently under construction on the Dnipro Metro's Tsentralno–Zavodska Line.

== History ==
The station was already envisioned in the 1980 official planning of the city's metro lines (the station was to be named "Ploshcha Lenina"). It was originally scheduled to be opened in 1993 as Ploshcha Lenina (Ukrainian: Площа Леніна), the station's construction was delayed significantly after the fall of the Soviet Union. Budget issues and economic instability in Ukraine further delayed the station's opening.

As an expansion of the current Dnipro Metro the station was projected to be opened by 2015. But construction was stopped because the tender to select the contractor was stopped by the city council in August 2015. Works are formally restarted in January 2017 and currently works are concentrated around future escalator shaft.

Deputy Mayor of Dnipro Mykhailo Lysenko stated in December 2020 that the station was estimated to be opened in 2024.

The February 2022 full-scale Russian invasion of Ukraine stopped all work on the expansion of Dnipro metro.

The station is located deep underground in the center of Dnipro, and will be located in between the Teatralna and Muzeina stations, both of which are also under construction. It is not known what final form the station will take on; whether it will be a deep column or a single-vault station. The station will be of deep column type.

It is projected that when a second metro line will be added to the system, Tsentralna will serve as a transfer station to the future second line's "Yevropeiska Ploshcha" station.

== Progress ==
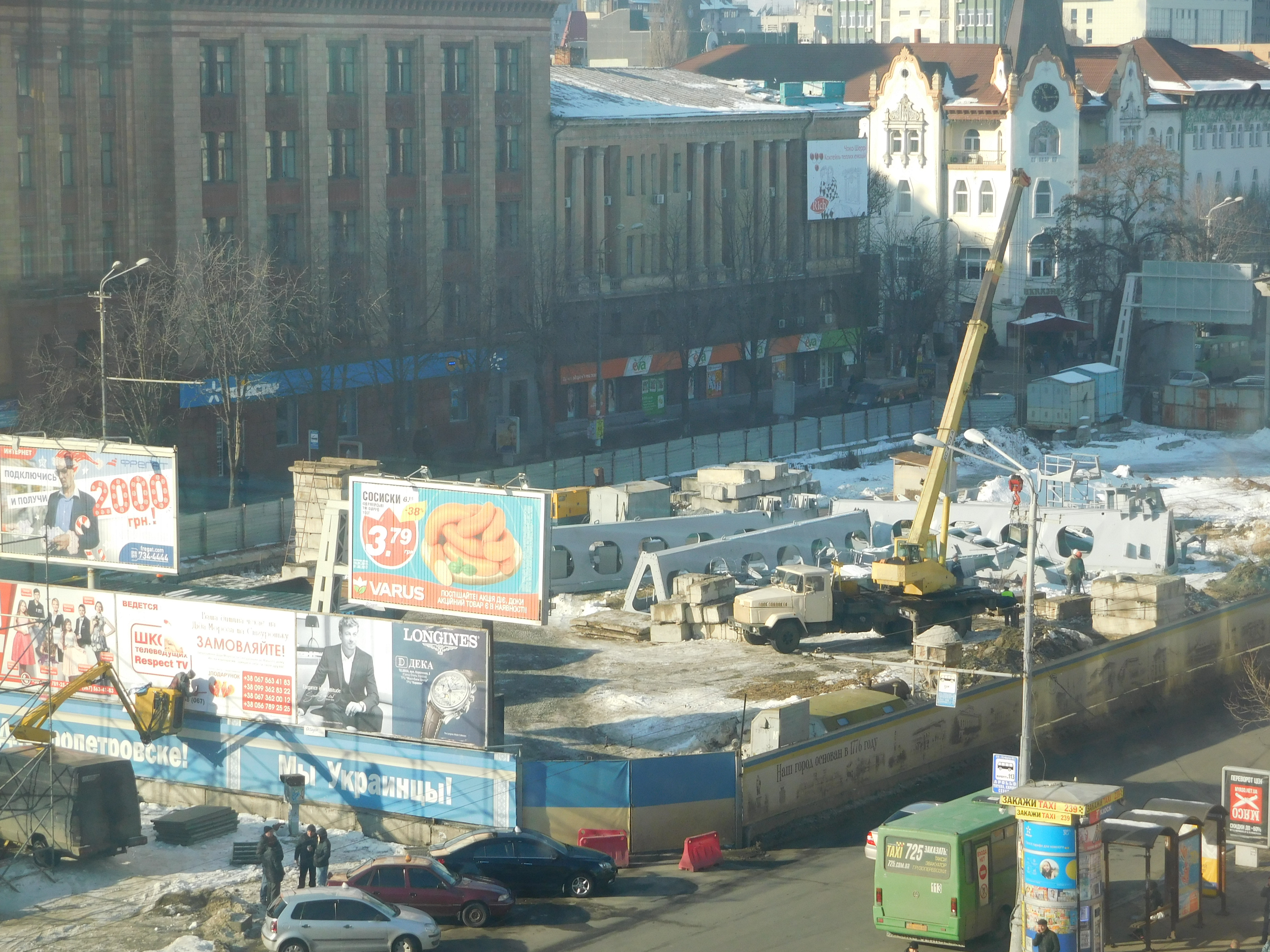
23 January 2017

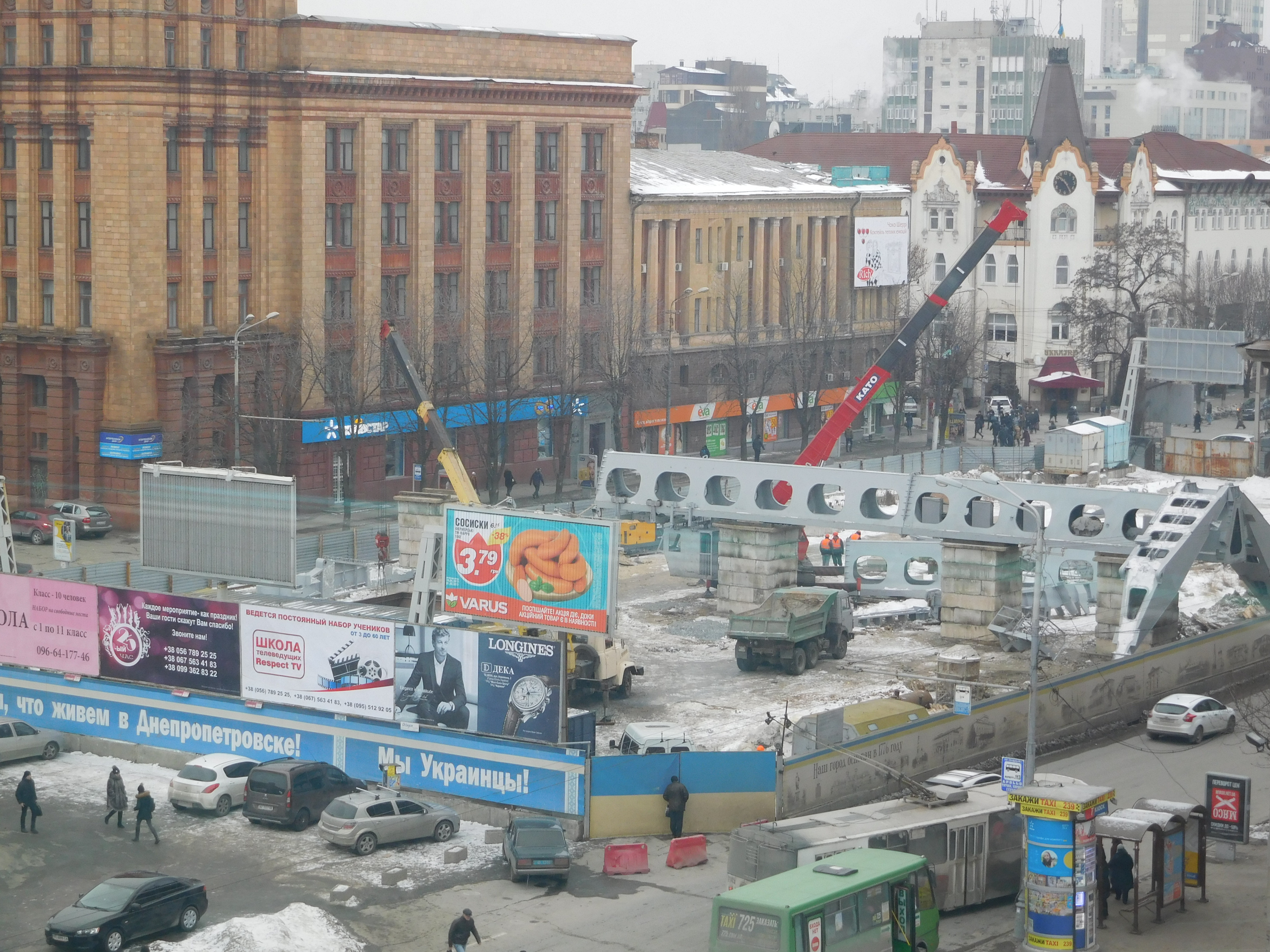
27 January 2017

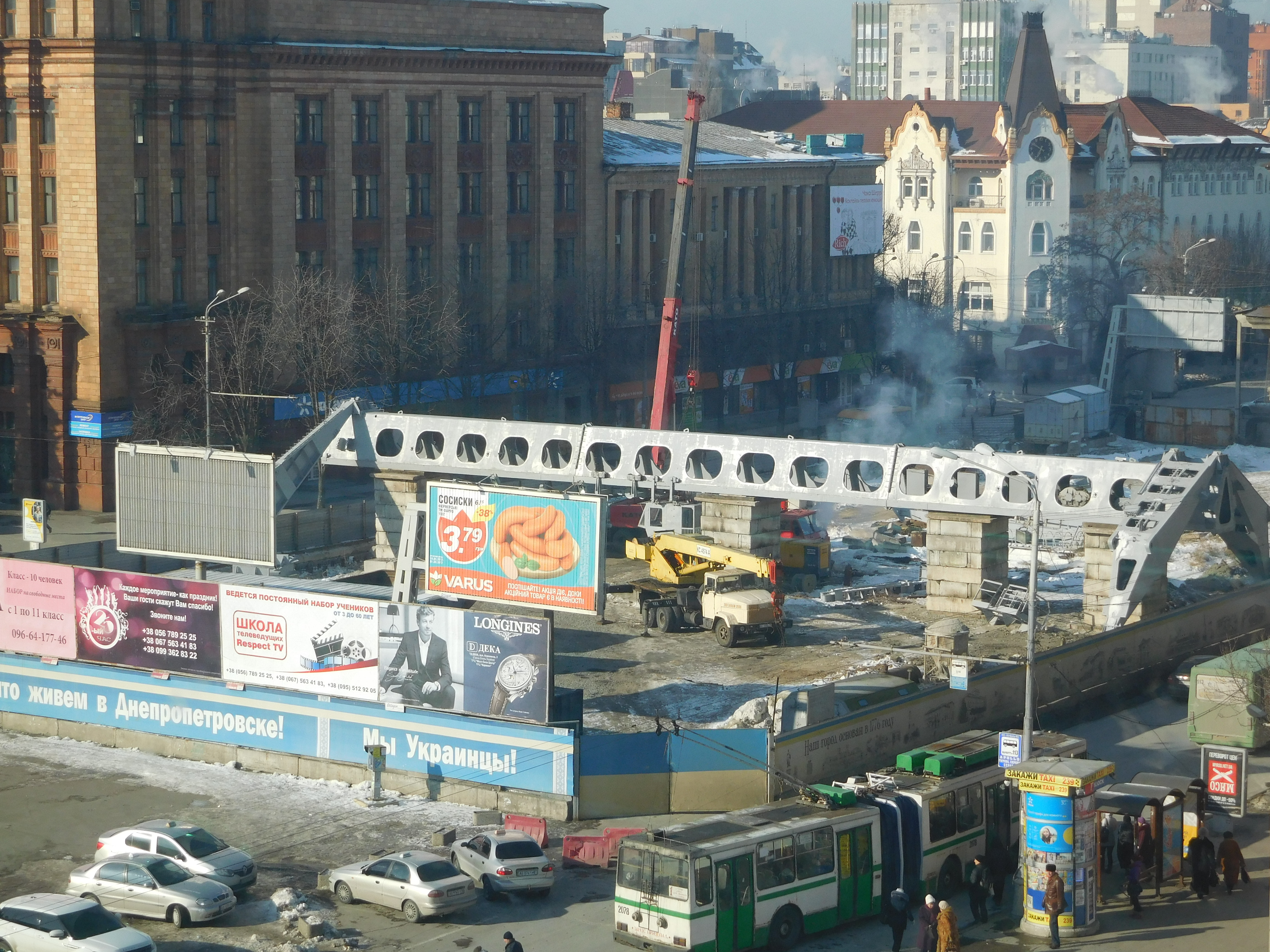
30 January 2017

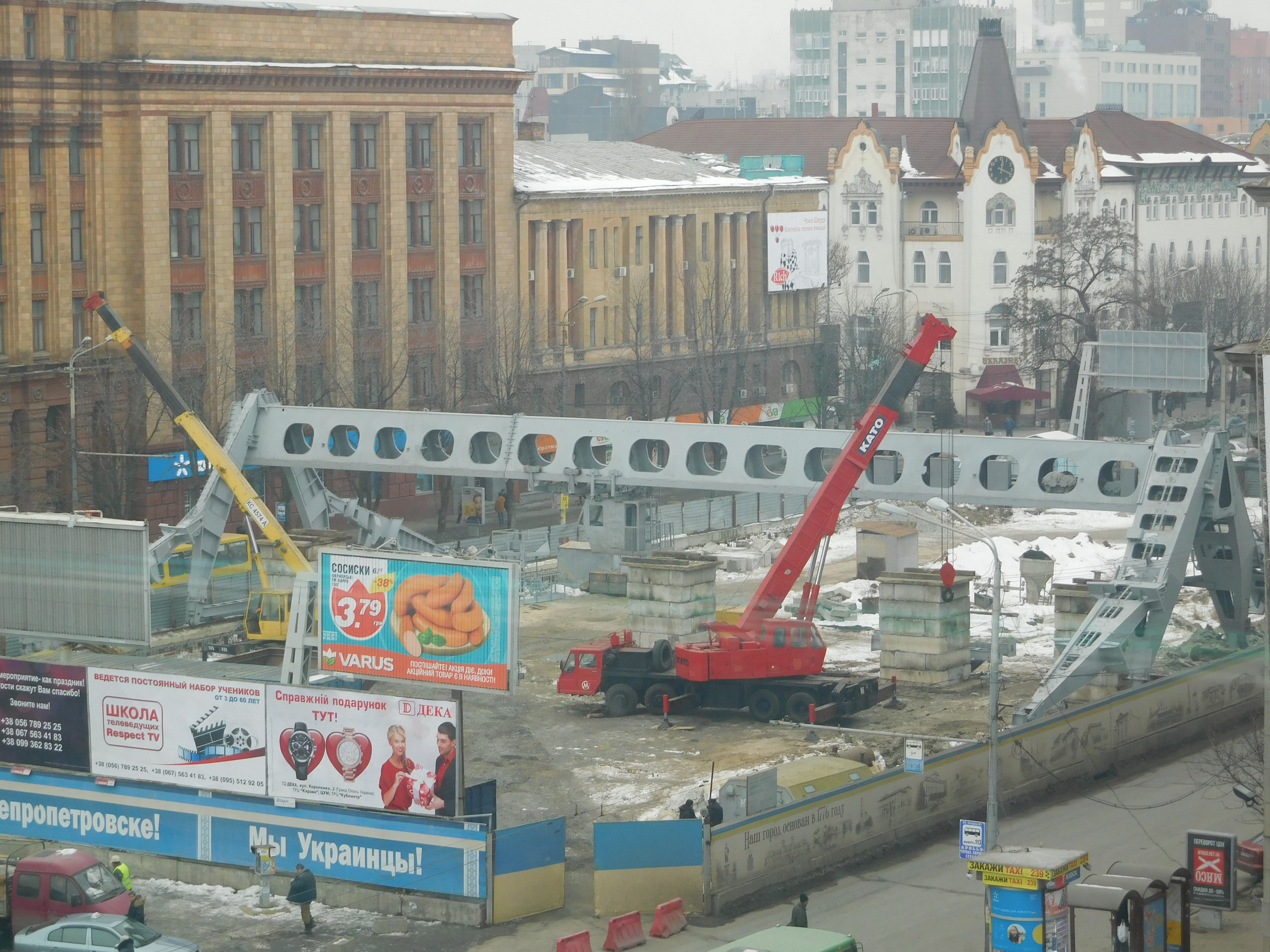
2 February 2017

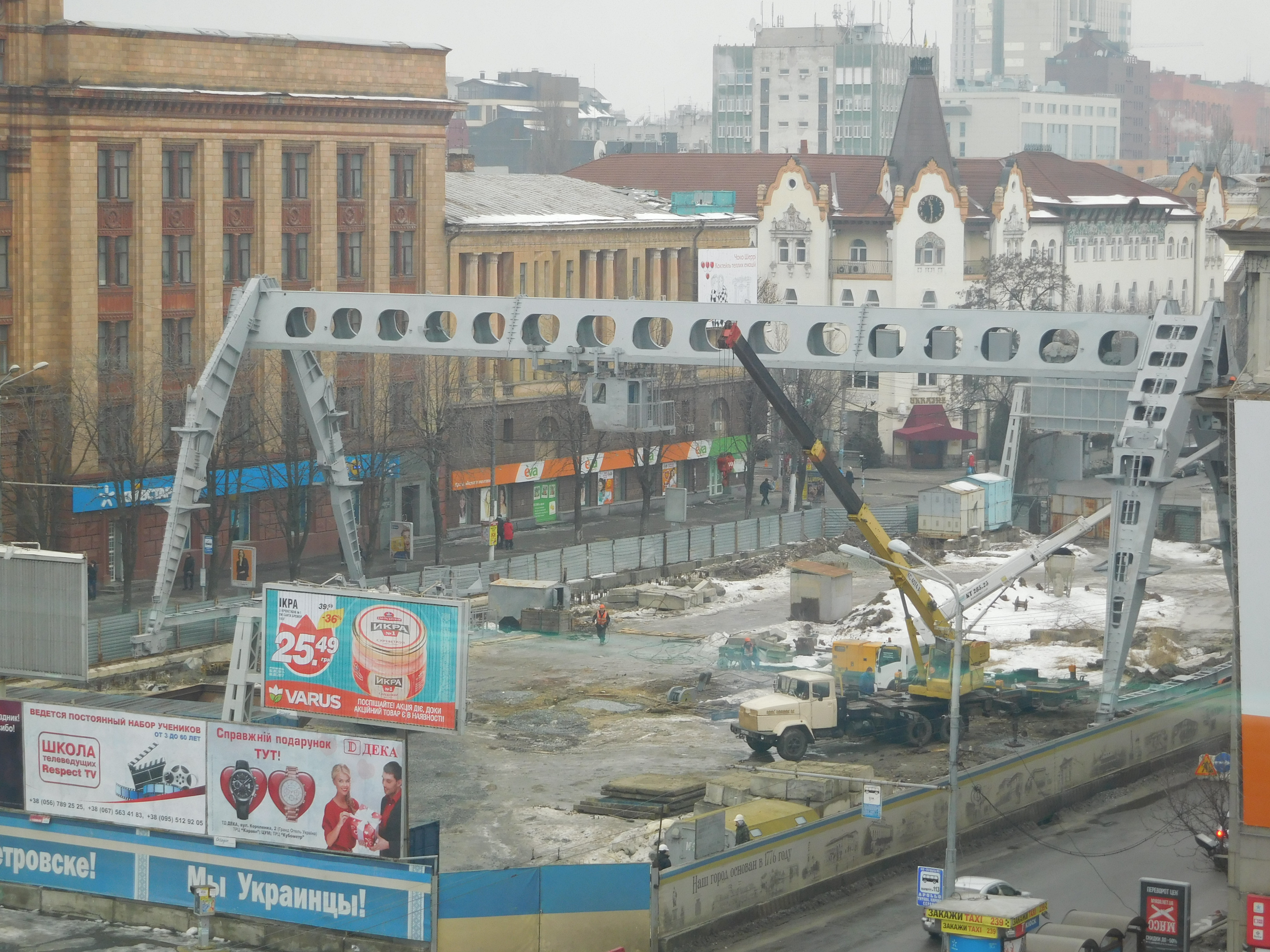
5 February 2017

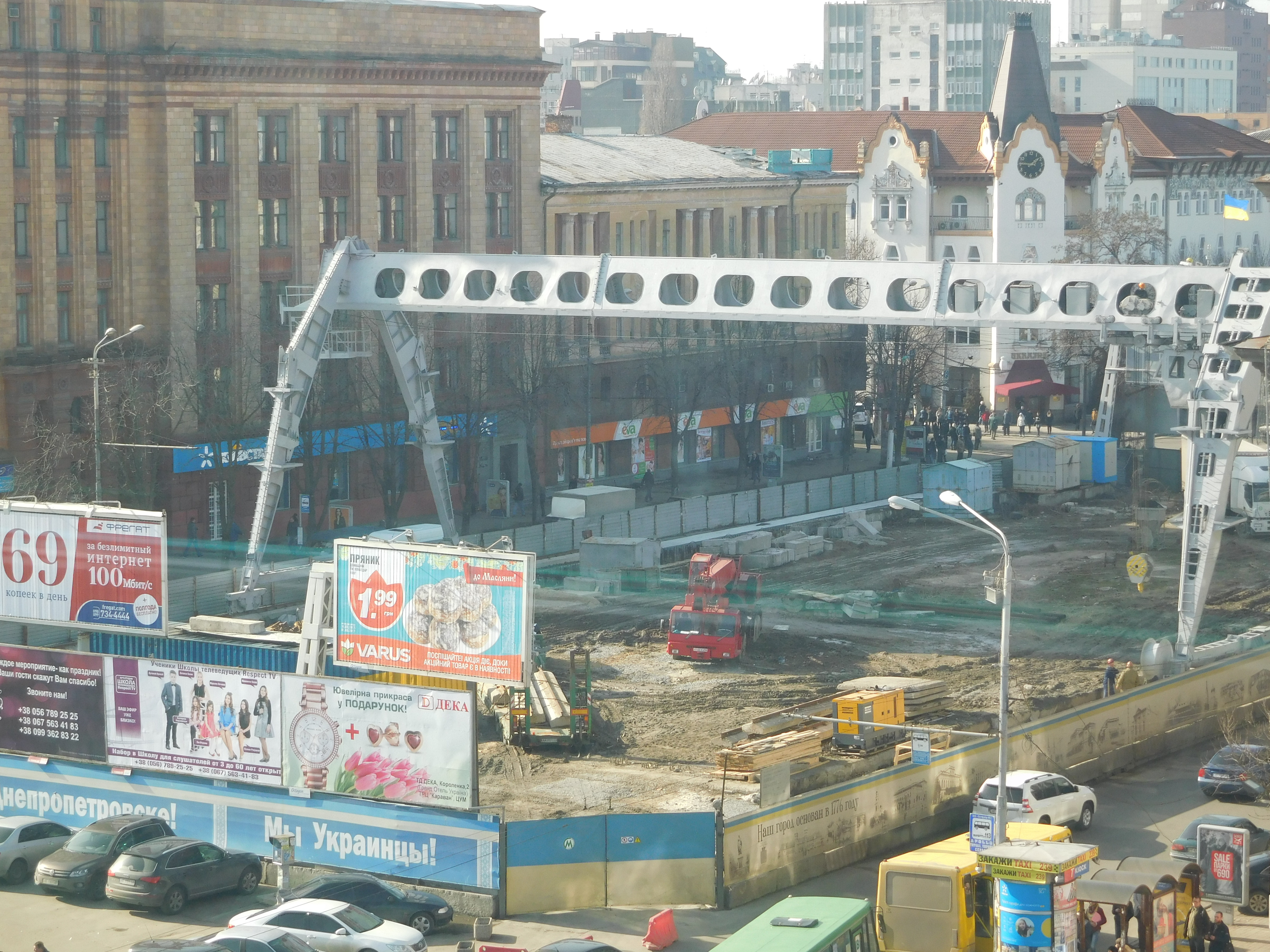
1 March 2017
