= Dnipro Metro =

Rapid transit system in Dnipro, Ukraine

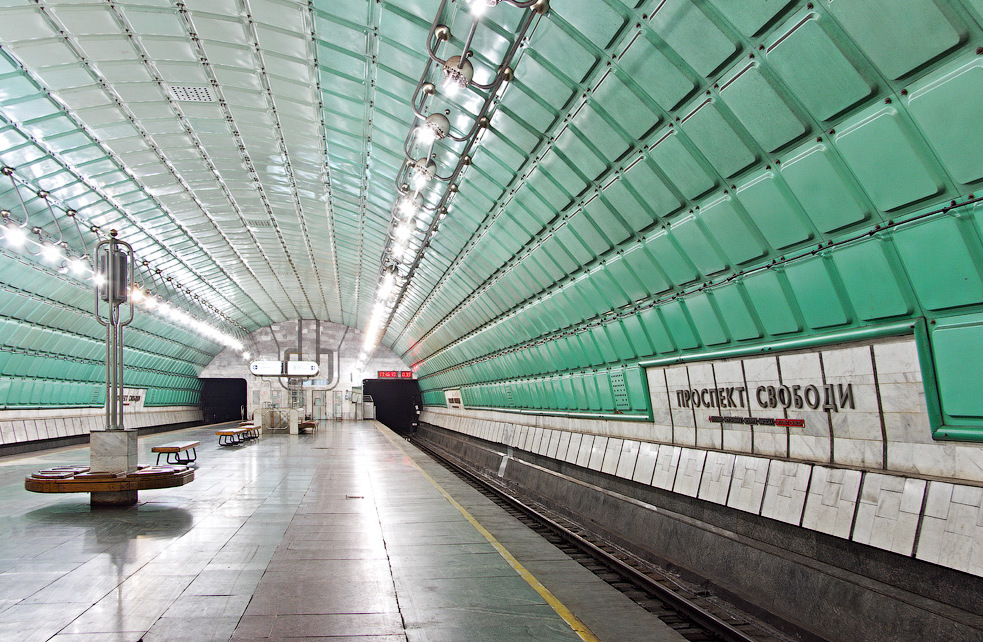

Overview
- Native name: Дніпровський метрополітен Dniprovskyi metropoliten
- Owner: City of Dnipro, Department of Transport and Transport Infrastructure
- Locale: Dnipro, Ukraine
- Transit type: Rapid transit
- Number of lines: 1
- Number of stations: 6
- Daily ridership: 20.4 thousand (2016)
- Annual ridership: 7.45 million (2016)
- Website: metro.dp.ua

Operation
- Began operation: December 29, 1995; 30 years ago
- Operator: Dniprovskyi metropoliten
- Number of vehicles: 45 (2013)
- Headway: 7–17 minutes

Technical
- System length: 7.8 km (4.8 mi)
- Track gauge: 1,524 mm (5 ft)
System map
A map of the Dnipro Metro

The Dnipro Metro (Ukrainian: Дніпровський метрополітен) is a single-line rapid transit system that serves the city of Dnipro, the fourth largest city in Ukraine by population. The metro was the third system constructed in Ukraine, after the Kyiv and Kharkiv metro systems, respectively, when it opened on December 29, 1995. The metro was the fourteenth built in the former Soviet Union region, and the first to open after the collapse of the Soviet Union in 1991.

The Dnipro Metro consists of one 7.8-kilometer (4.8 mi) line and just 6 stations, making it one of the smallest metro systems in the world. The line starts at Vokzalna station, near the city's central railway station in the east and ends at Pokrovska station in the western part of the city. The system is open from 05:30 to 23:00. Ridership on the metro has steadily declined since its opening in 1995. In 2013, the metro carried 7.51 million passengers compared to 18.2 million in 1995. Initially, the metro trains carried five train cars each, but as the passenger ridership declined, the number of cars was reduced to three. The price for a single ride is currently ₴10; either plastic tokens or transit cards are used at the entrance gates.

Prior to the Russian invasion of Ukraine, expansion plans aimed to increase the number of stations to nine by 2024, extending the line by 4 km (2.5 mi) to a total of 11.8 km (7.3 miles).

== History ==
With help from the First Secretary of the Central Committee of the Communist Party of Ukraine Vladimir Shcherbitsky, in 1979 the Council of Ministers of the Soviet Union affirmed the Central Committee of the Communist Party's plan of action to allow the Gosplan (government planning agency) and the communication and transportation construction ministries to conduct research on the construction of a metropolitan system in Dnipropetrovsk. In 1980, four lines were planned with one line parallel to the Dnieper with nine stations: Pokrovska, Prospekt Svobody, Zavodska, Metalurhiv, Metrobudivnykiv, Vokzalna, Teatralna, Tsentralna and "Muzeina".

A second line was planned to pass through residential areas and industrial enterprises of the southern right-bank part of the city, Lenin Square and residential areas on the left bank of the Dnieper. A third was planned to connect through "the center quarters of the southwestern part with the north on the left bank of the Dnieper." A planned fourth line would run along the left bank and cross residential areas and industrial areas of the northern part of the city. After the Teatralna, Tsentralna, and Muzeina stations are completed, Dnipro's first metro line as it was originally envisioned in 1980 will be complete. In November 2018 city authorities expected these three new stations to be opened by the summer of 2023.

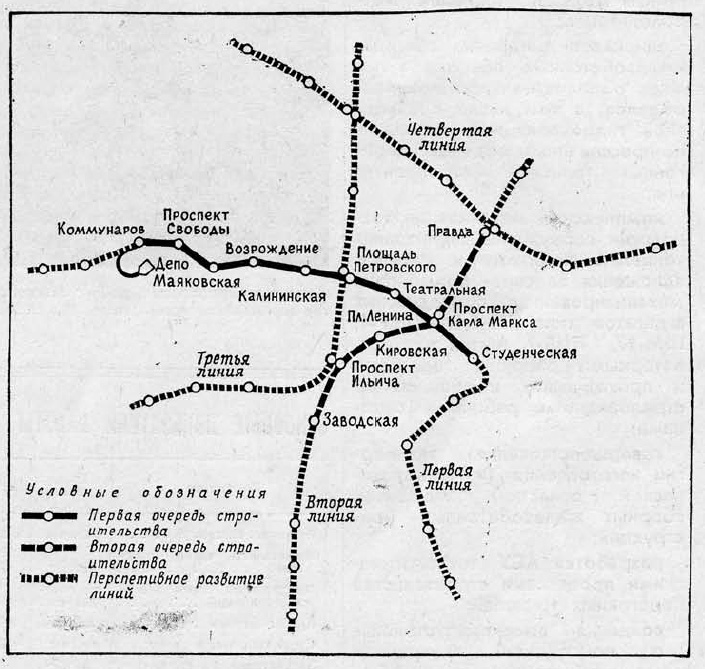
All four lines of the Dnipro Metro as they were envisioned in 1980

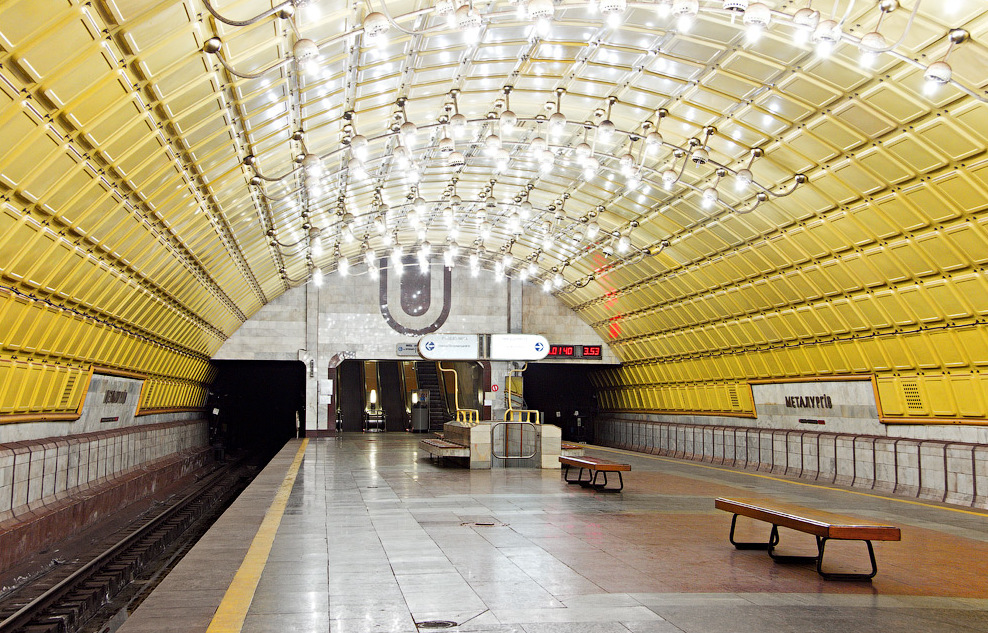
Metalurhiv station.

On March 15, 1982, following a decree by the Council of Ministers of the Soviet Union the Dnipro Metro was included in the list of first-priority construction projects. It was planned to be finished by the 12th five-year plan. Soon after the death of Leonid Brezhnev on 10 November 1982 the country ended up in economic hardship and financing of the project was reduced. In 1988 Mikhail Gorbachev visited Dnipro and promised the residents to help with finishing the projects. His promises were left unrealized.

With the dissolution of the Soviet Union, the project was halted. In 1994 it was decided to force the completion of the project and with the help of the chairman of the regional council Pavlo Lazarenko, these plans were realised when the system's first line, the Tsentralno-Zavodska Line, was opened to the public on December 29, 1995.

The Dnipro Metro system was constructed following the typical Soviet metro construction format. Out of the six stations, five are located deep underground and one is placed near the surface. Four of the deep stations are single vaults built on Leningrad technology and one is a Pylon. The only shallow station is a pillar trispan. Owing to the economic recession of the early 1990s, the metro stations lack the same level of decoration and architectural integrity as those built in Soviet times.

== Future growth ==
Three stations are currently under construction, which would expand the system from the Dnipro Central Railway Station (at Vokzalna) to the city centre; Teatralna (near the Theatre of Opera and Ballet), Tsentralna, and Muzeina (near the Museum of History). Construction on these three stations was restarted in late February 2011 after being completely halted in July 2009. A lack of funding for the construction also was because Dnipropetrovsk was not chosen as one of the host cities of the UEFA Euro 2012 football championship.

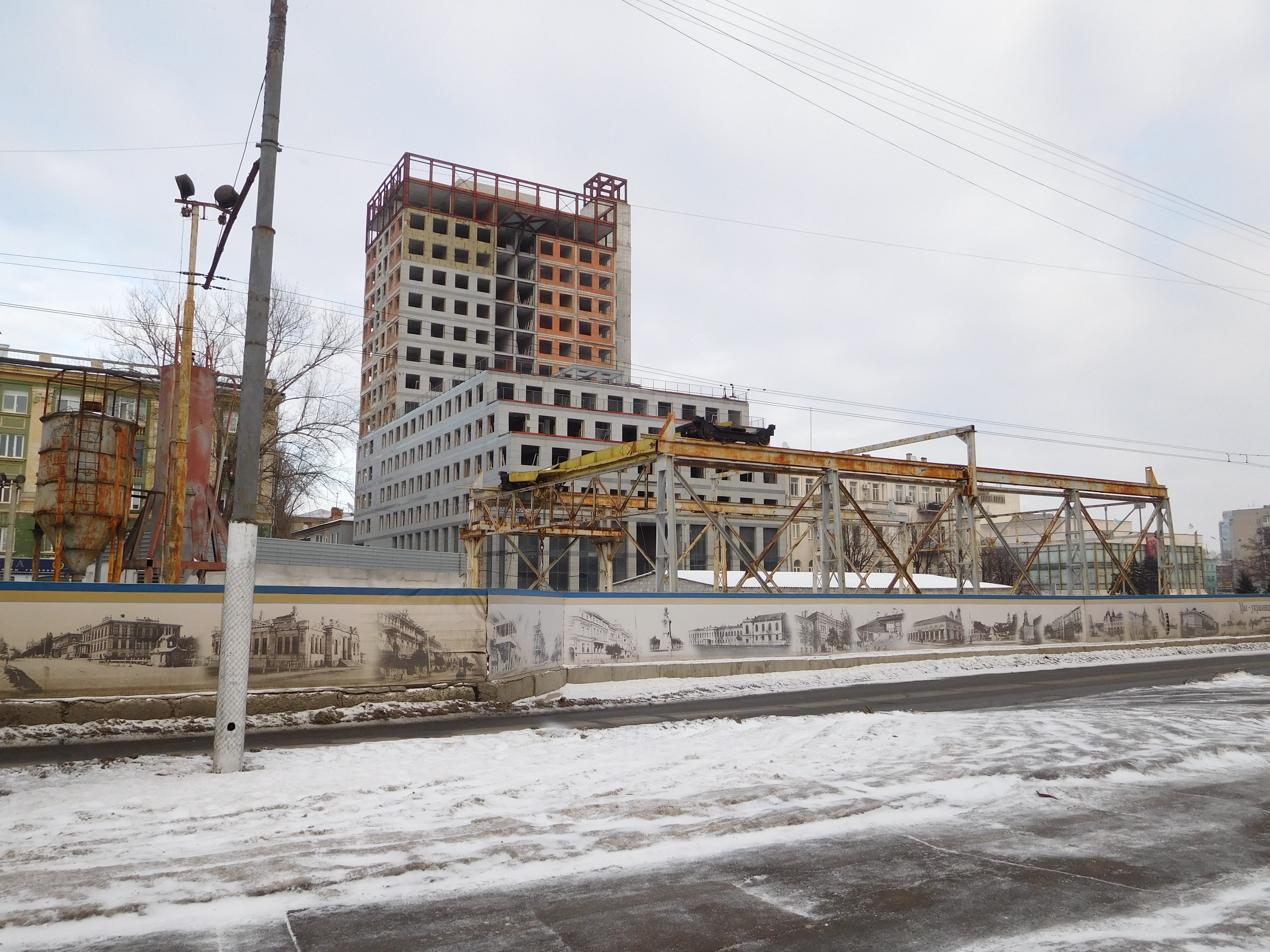
The building site of the future metro station Teatralna in 2017

In June 2014, President Petro Poroshenko signed the 2014 budget into law which will allocate funding to the "Dnipropetrovskyi Metropoliten" company for the completion of the metro line. The two new stations in the city centre, Teatralna and Tsentralna, were expected to be finished by 2015, whilst Muzeina was according to plans to be finished by 2016. Another station, "Parus", is planned for the western terminus of the Tsentralno-Zavodska Line.

Construction did not start because the tender to select the contractor was stopped by the city council in August 2015. In the summer of 2016, the mayor of Dnipro Borys Filatov and representatives of Limak Holding signed a contract to build the Dnipro subway. The active phase of work started in April 2017.

In November 2018, city authorities expected the three new stations to be opened by the summer of 2023. At the beginning of 2019, it was announced that there were allocated some ₴1.4 billion as a subvention from the state budget. In December 2020 Dnipro authorities planned that the new stations would be opened in 2024. This date became untenable following the February 2022 full-scale Russian invasion of Ukraine, due to the ongoing war all work has been stopped and the provisionally secured construction is facing flooding and falling into disrepair.

After the first additions to the line segment, the total length of the only line was expected to be 11.82 kilometers (7.34 mi), with 9 stations. In the long-term perspective, a second line was planned to span across the Dnieper, and potentially have 80 kilometers (50 mi) of track on three lines minimum.

== See also ==
- Kyiv Metro
- Kharkiv Metro
- Kryvyi Rih Metrotram
