= Muzeina (Dnipro Metro) =

Metro station in Dnipro, Ukraine

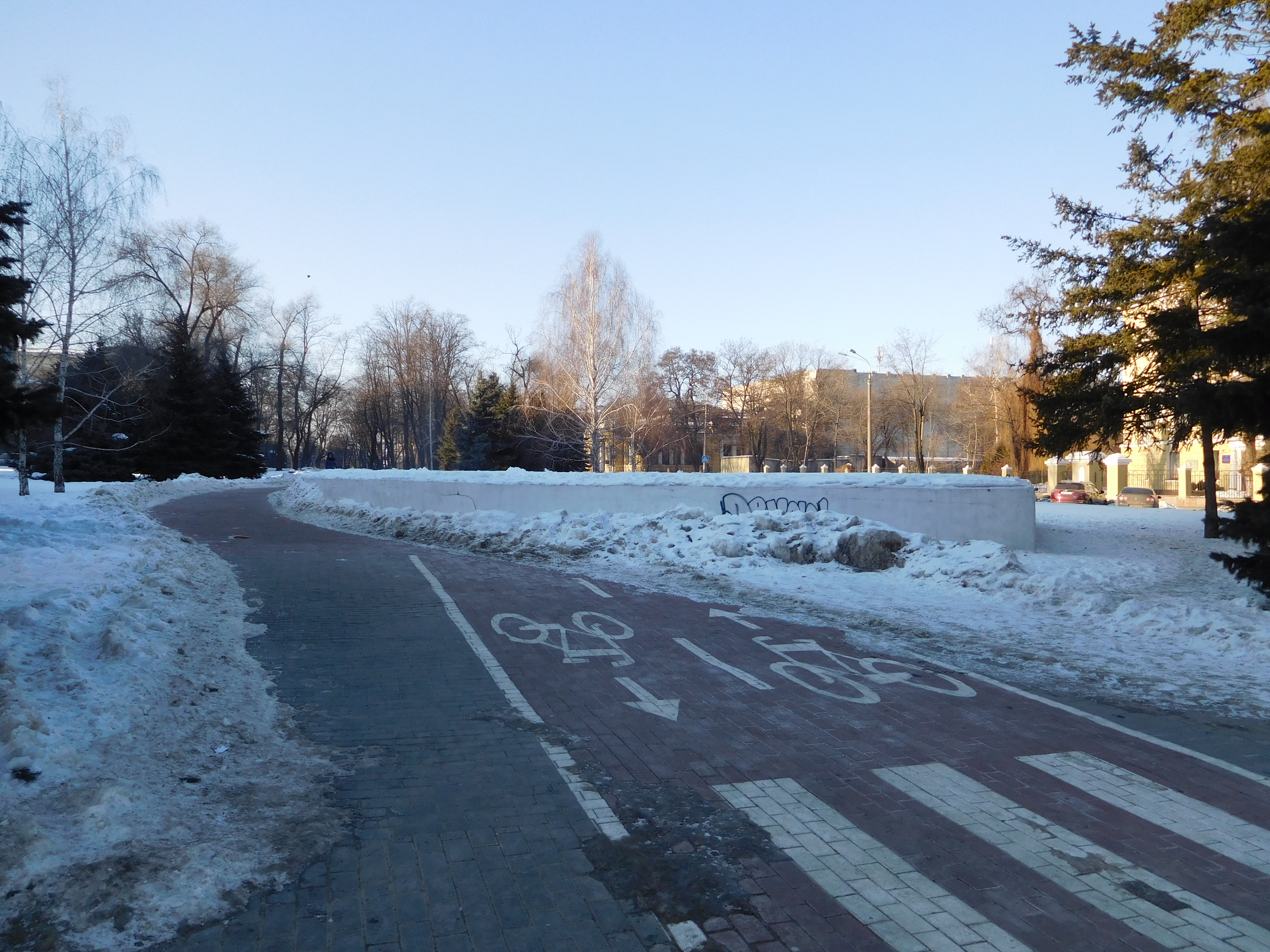
- Site of future station, January 2017

General information
- Coordinates: 48°27′20″N 35°03′55″E
- System: Dnipro Metro Station
- Owner: Dnipro Metro
- Line: Tsentralno–Zavodska line

Construction
- Structure type: Underground

History
- Opening: unknown

Services
Preceding station	Dnipro Metro	Following station
Tsentralna towards Pokrovska	Tsentralno–Zavodska line	Terminus
Location

Muzeina (Ukrainian: Музейна) is a station currently under construction on the Dnipro Metro's Tsentralno–Zavodska Line. The station is named for its proximity next to the Dmytro Yavornytsky National Historical Museum of Dnipro.

== History ==
The station was already envisioned in the 1980 official planning of the city's metro lines, where it was referred to as "Studentska". Originally scheduled to open in 1993, these plans were postponed due to the collapse of the Soviet Union. The opening of the station was further delayed due to budget problems and economic instability in Ukraine.

The station, projected to be part of the Dnipro Metro expansion, was expected to open by 2015. However, construction came to a halt when the city council suspended the tender process to select a contractor in August 2015.

Deputy Mayor of Dnipro Mykhailo Lysenko stated in December 2020 that the station was estimated to be opened in 2024.

The February 2022 full-scale Russian invasion of Ukraine stopped all work on the expansion of Dnipro metro.

The station is situated deep underground in the center of Dnipro, immediately following Tsentralna, another station currently undergoing construction. The final design of the station, whether it will be a deep column or a single-vault structure, remains unknown. The station will be of deep column type.
