= Serhiy Nigoyan =

Ukrainian activist (1993–2014)

Hero of Ukraine Serhiy Nigoyan
- Սերգեյ Նիգոյան; Сергій Нігоян
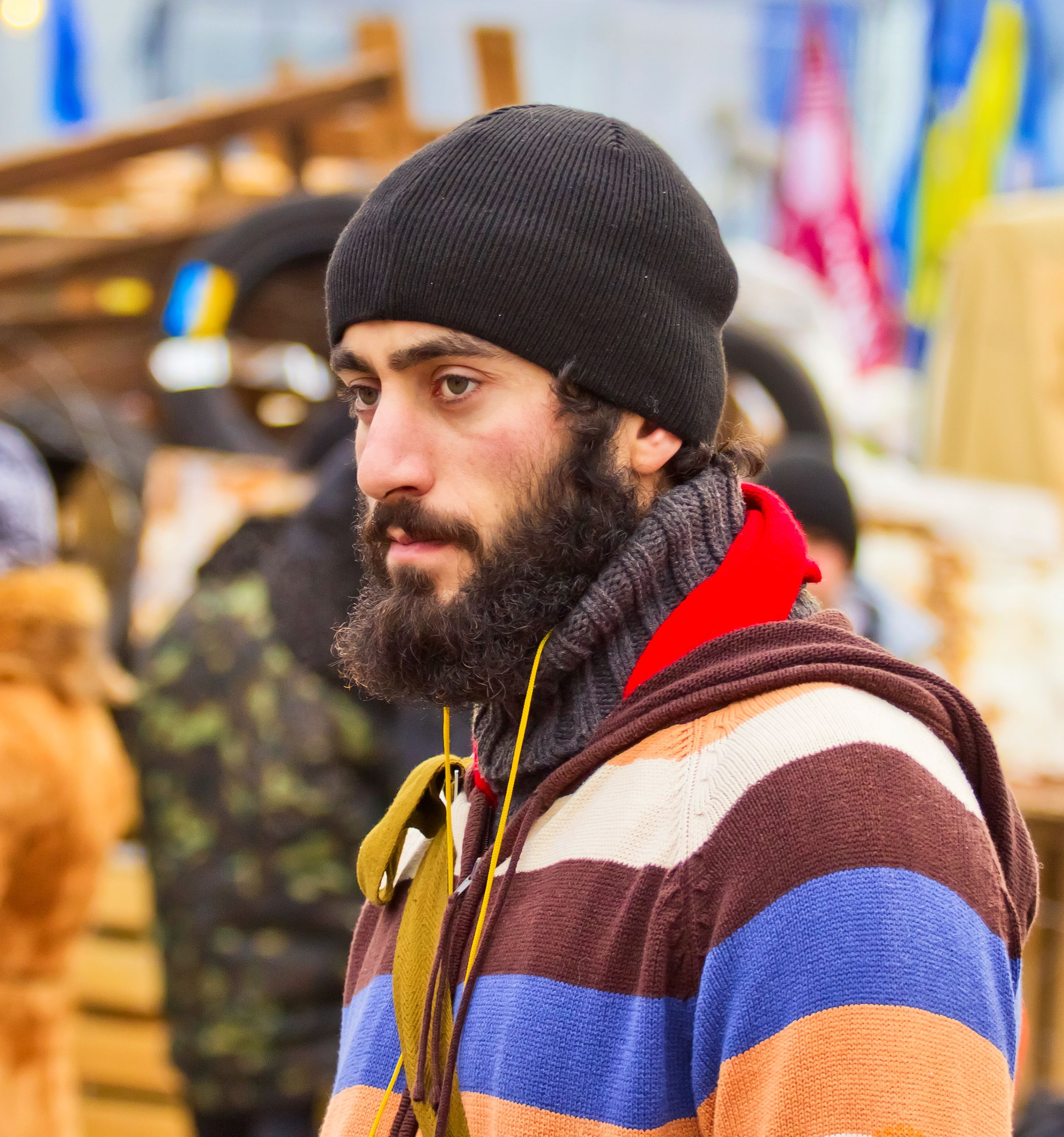
- Serhiy Nigoyan on the barricade in Euromaidan.
- Born: Serhiy Garnikovych Nigoyan; August 2, 1993 village Bereznuvativka, Solone Raion, Dnipropetrovsk Oblast, Ukraine
- Died: January 22, 2014 (aged 20); Hrushevskoho Street, Kyiv, Ukraine
- Cause of death: Gunshot wounds (lead shrapnel)
- Resting place: village Bereznuvativka, Solone Raion, Dnipropetrovsk Oblast, Ukraine
- Other name: Samvel Nigoyan
- Education: Dniprodzerzhynsk College of Physical Education
- Occupations: student, sports amateur
- Years active: 2013–14 (as activist)
- Known for: being the first protester to die of a gunshot wound during Euromaidan
- Parent: Garegin Nigoyan
- Awards: Hero of Ukraine (2014)

Serhiy Gagikovych Nigoyan or Nihoyan (Ukrainian: Сергій Нігоян, Armenian: Սերգեյ Նիգոյան; August 2, 1993 – January 22, 2014) was an Armenian-Ukrainian Euromaidan activist who was fatally shot during the 2014 Hrushevskoho Street protests where he was acting as security. He was the first protester killed by shooting during the protest.

== Biography ==
Serhiy Nigoyan was born on August 2, 1993, to ethnic Armenians in the village of Bereznuvativka (south of Dnipro, then still under the Soviet name Dnipropetrovsk) in Ukraine. Serhiy Nigoyan's parents are from the village Navur, in Armenia's northeastern province of Tavush, not far from the Azerbaijani border. They moved to Ukraine in the early 1990s, during the First Nagorno-Karabakh War when their village was often attacked. Some relatives of Serhiy's father Gagik still live in Navur.

Serhiy was an only child. He was born in Ukraine and never visited his ancestral land, yet loved his country. According to his father, on a wall next to Serhiy's bed hangs the flag of Armenia. Serhiy was attending the Armenian Church and knew the history of his people. His father also stated that Serhiy studied at the Kamianske, then Dniprodzerzhynsk, College of Physical Education, but after two years of study he ceased attending classes and in summer along with his father was visiting Crimea for seasonal work. Nigoyan was an amateur fighter in kyokushinkaikan karate and in the 2012 city championship in Kamianske, he placed third.

Filming the project "There are people" (Ukrainian: «Є люди») to the 200th Anniversary of Shevchenko, producer Serhiy Proskrunia managed to record video footage of Nigoyan reading a fragment of Shevchenko's poem "Caucasus".

Glory to you, the blue mountains constrained by ice and to you great knights by God not forgotten. Fight and overcome, God is helping you! Truth is behind you, strength is behind you, and liberty sacred!

=== Death and burial ===
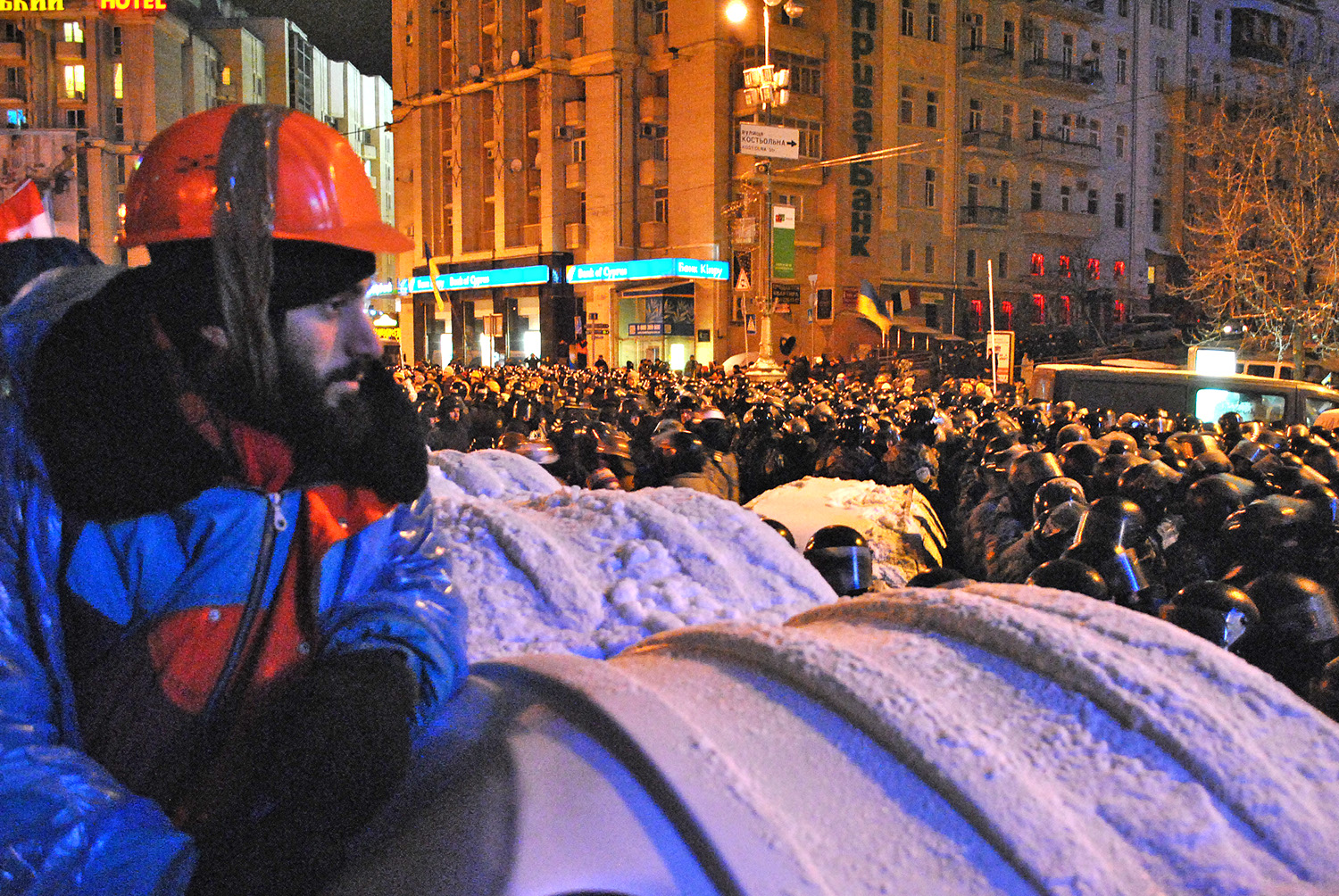
Serhiy Nigoyan on the barricade of Myhailivska street, December 11, 2013.

He died early in the morning of January 22, 2014, at around 06.30 after being mortally wounded. Soon after, at around 08.10, Berkut violently charged protesters on Hrushevskoho street, near the Lobanovsky Dynamo Stadium.

On January 23, 2014, the Televised News Service (TSN) showed a footage with interview of Nigoyan filmed on January 19 by the TSN's cameraman. On a question why he came to Euromaidan, Nigoyan stated that he did so in protest against beating of students by Berkut militsiya. While proud to be an Armenian, Nigoyan wanted to express his support for people among which he was born and with which he lived.

On January 26, 2014, Nigoyan was buried in his native village Bereznuvativka. His funeral was attended by local villagers, representative of the Armenian diaspora, priests from Armenian and Ukrainian Churches. His requiem was served by the head of Ukrainian Eparchy of the Armenian Apostolic Church Archbishop Grigoris Buniatyan.

==== Reaction ====
On January 22, 2014, in his Twitter Svyatoslav Vakarchuk mentioned that "another Armenian, Parajanov created the film (Shadows of Forgotten Ancestors) that became symbol for all Ukrainians, today Armenian Nigoyan sacrificed his life that became a symbol of Ukraine".

Valentyn Sylvestrov (b. 1937), a renowned Ukrainian composer, dedicated a memorial diptych to Serhiy Nigoyan. The new pieces use lyrics by Taras Shevchenko which Nigoyan had quoted, and the traditional liturgical text "With the saints give rest".

== Legacy ==
On February 20, 2014, a group of Armenian opposition activists attempted to rename a square in the Armenian town of Spitak from Viktor Yanukovych Square to Serhiy Nigoyan Square.

On March 27, 2014, the Berezhany city council adopted a decision to rename a street named after the Soviet writer Yaroslav Halan to Nigoyan Street.

On 28 January 2015 the Dnipro city council renamed Kalinin Avenue to Prospekt Serhiy Nigoyan. The decision was abolished by the Dnipro Administrative Court of Appeal in June 2017 on procedural grounds, however the name was reinstated by a separate resolution on February 21, 2018.

In early 2014 Ukrainian composer Valentyn Sylvestrov dedicated two songs to the memory of Nigoyan.

== Photos ==
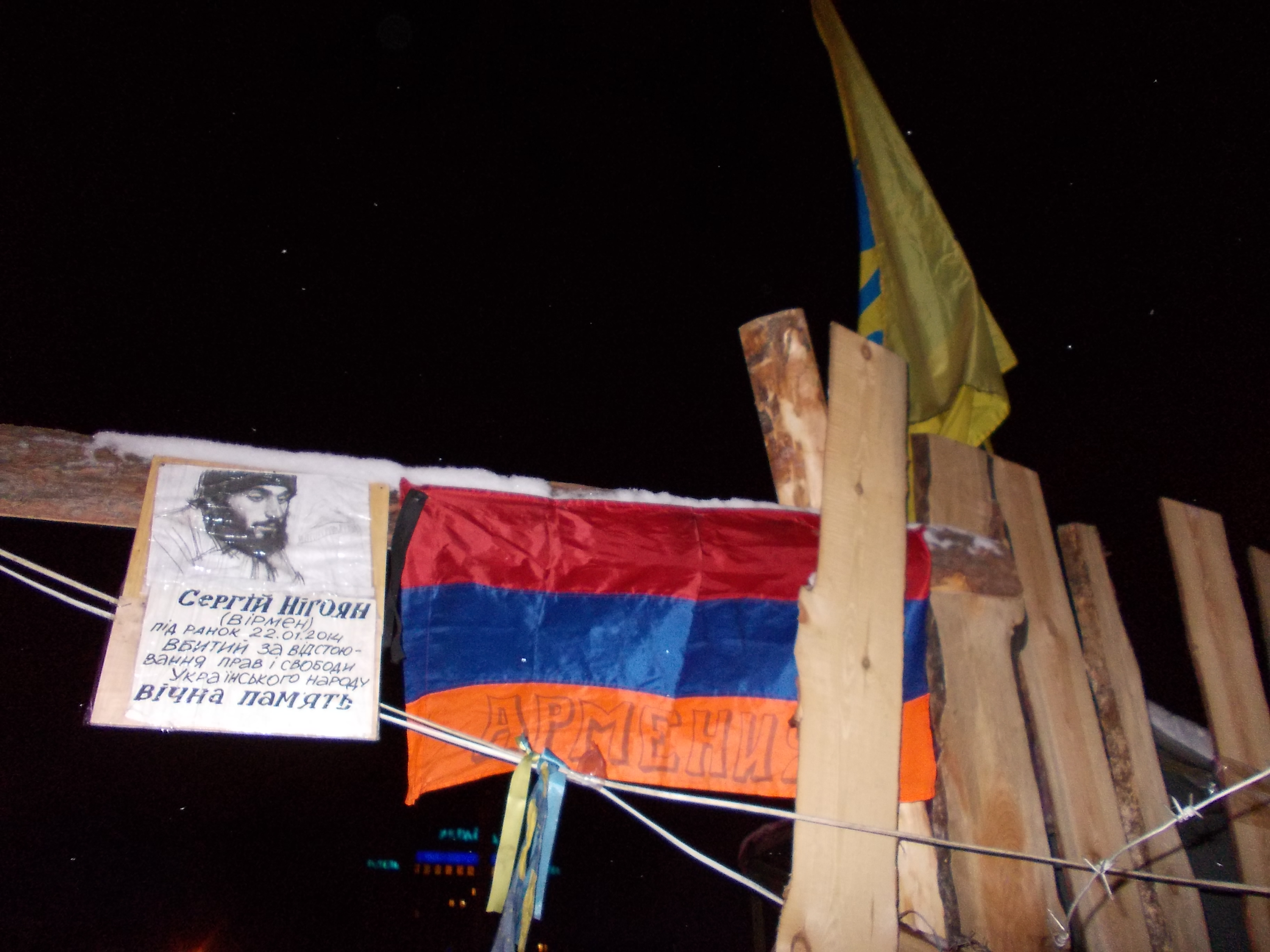
Portrait of Serhiy Nigoyan with flags of Armenia and Ukraine at barricade No. 32 in Independence square, Kyiv, Ukraine.

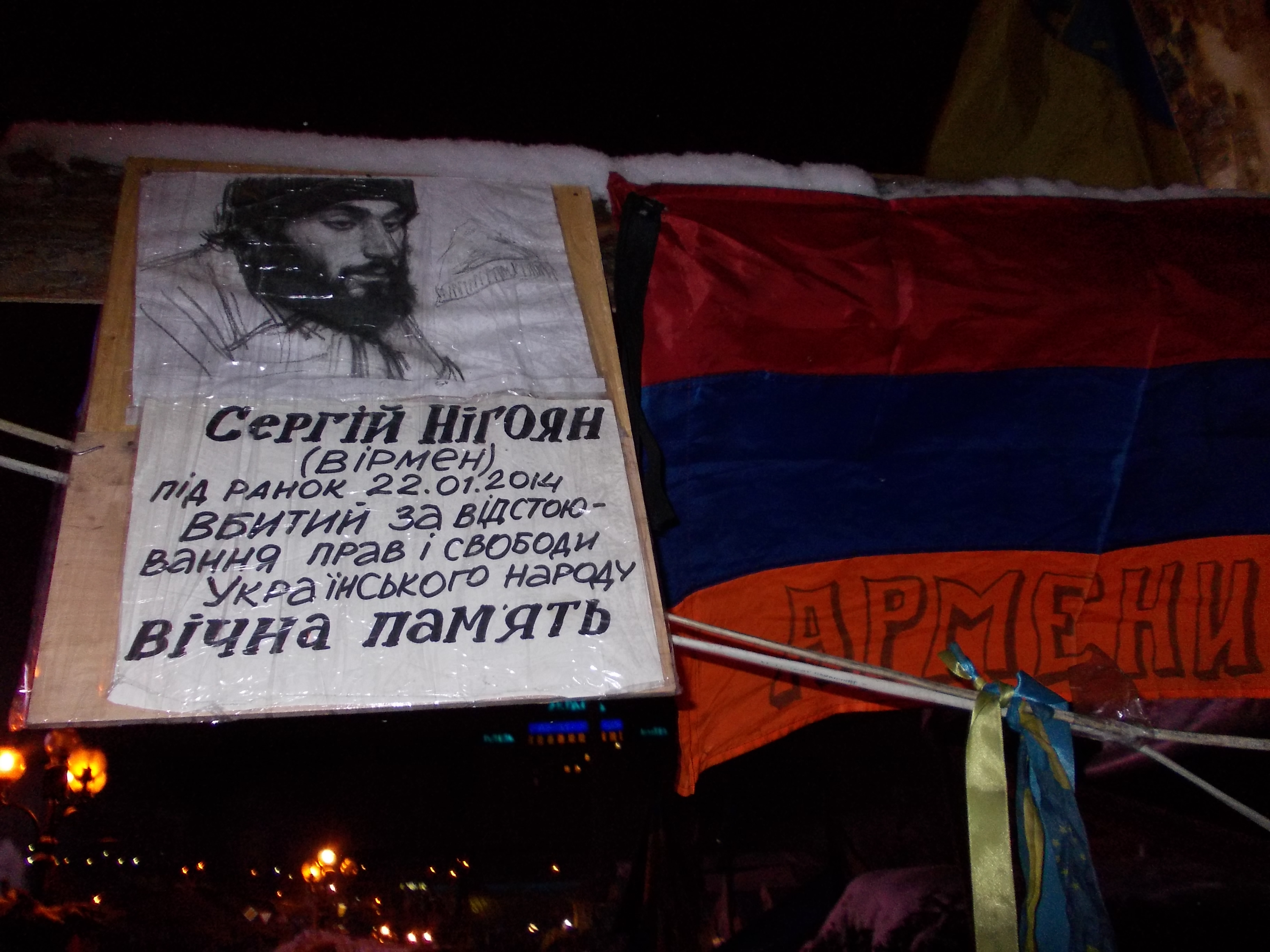
Portrait of Serhiy Nigoyan with the flag of Armenia at the gates of barricade No 32.

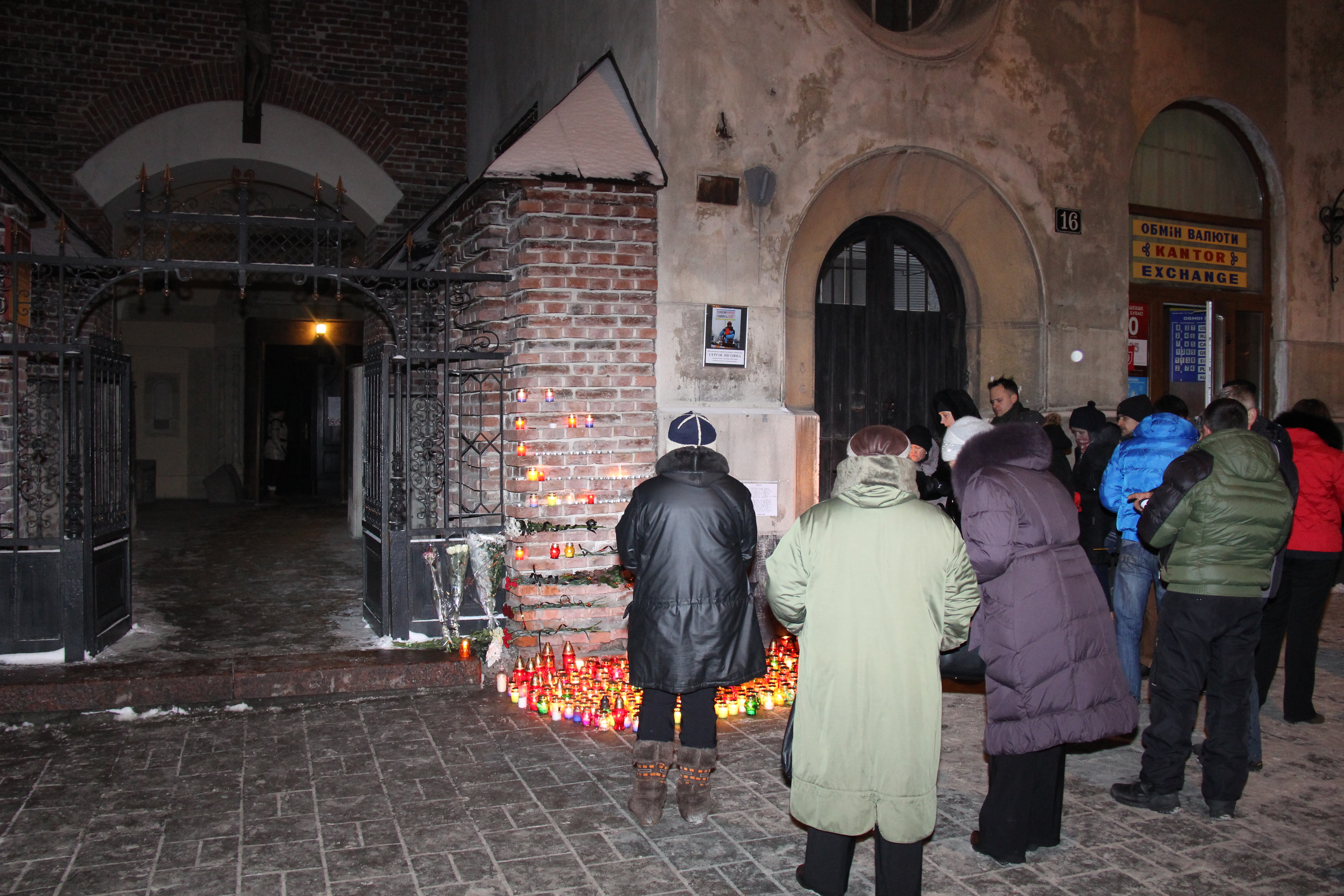
Mourning for Serhiy Nigoyan in Lviv

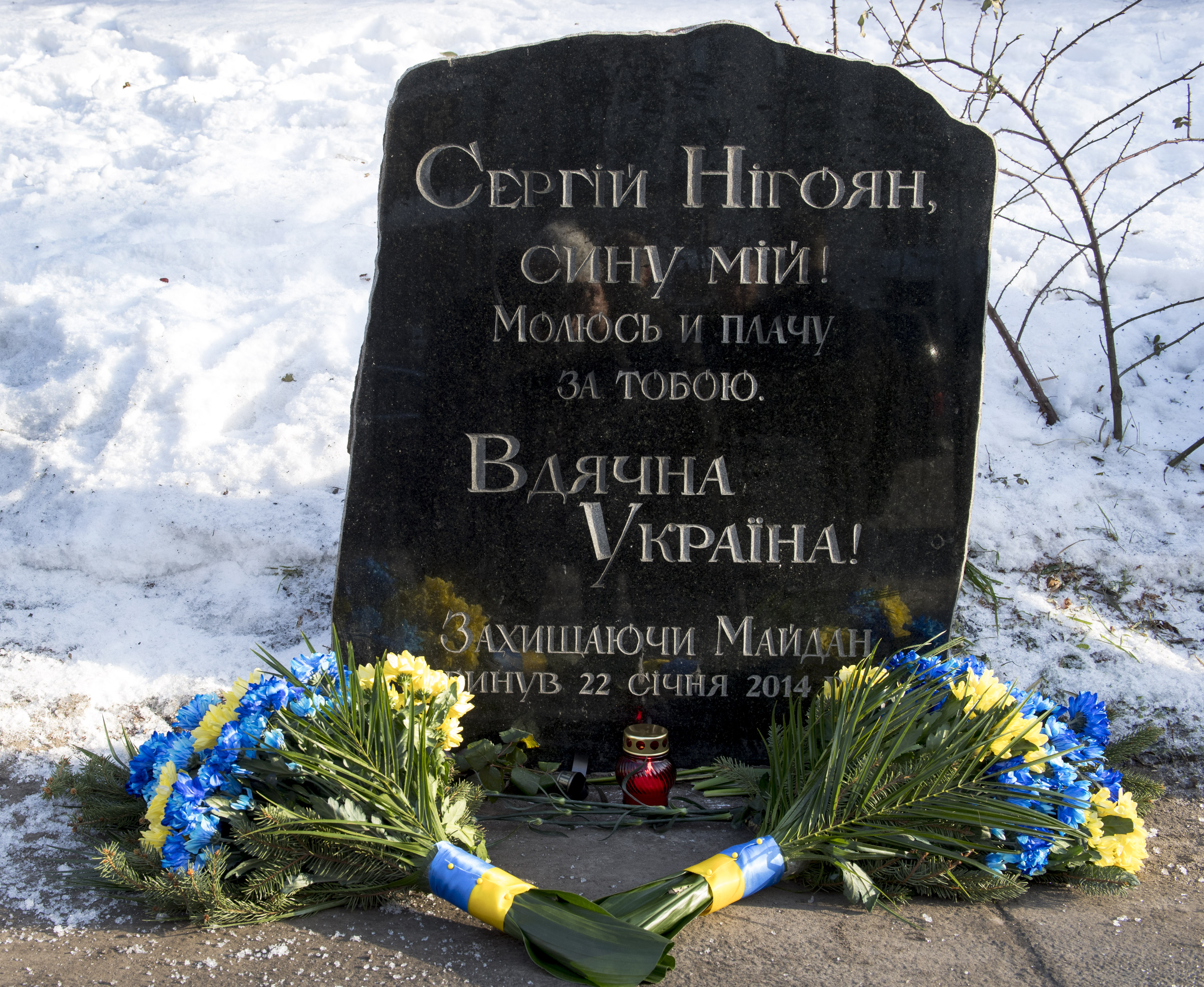
Serhiy Nigoyan memorial diptych
