= Vokzalna (Dnipro Metro) =

Station of the Dnipro Metro

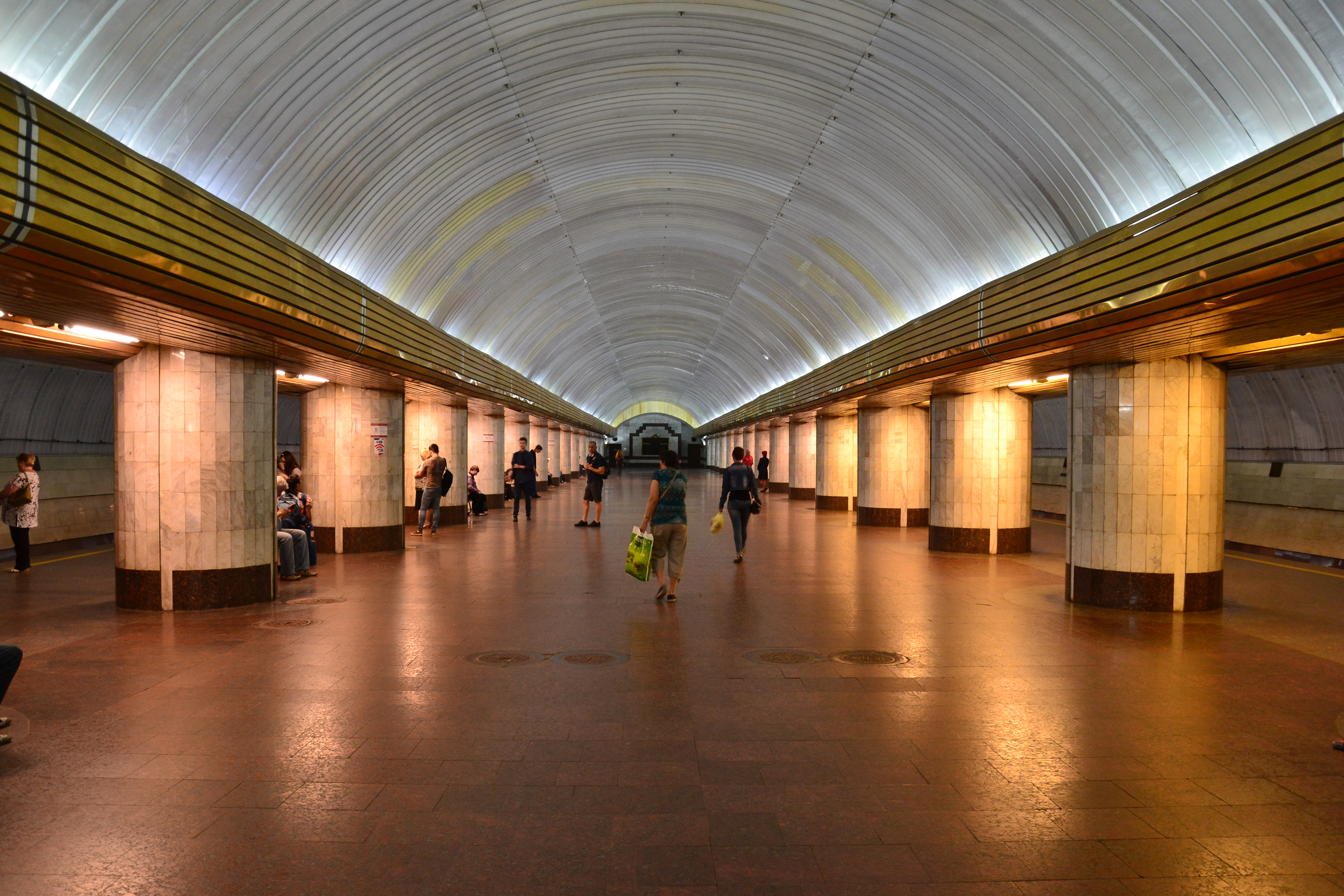

General information
- Coordinates: 48°28′31.12″N 35°0′55.52″E
- System: Dnipro Metro Station
- Owner: Dnipro Metro
- Line: Tsentralno–Zavodska line

Construction
- Structure type: Underground, deep column station

History
- Opened: 29 December 1995

Services
Preceding station	Dnipro Metro	Following station
Metrobudivnykiv towards Pokrovska	Tsentralno–Zavodska line	Terminus

Future services (2024)
Preceding station	Dnipro Metro	Following station
Metrobudivnykiv towards Pokrovska	Tsentralno–Zavodska line	Teatralna towards Muzeina
Location

Vokzalna (Ukrainian: Вокзальна) is a station on Dnipro Metro's Tsentralno–Zavodska Line. The station is the eastern terminus of the line and was opened on 29 December 1995. However, once the nearby Teatralna station will be completed, it will cease being the eastern terminus.

The station has three exits, all of which exit onto the Vokzalna Square. The station is named Vokzalna for the located nearby main railway station in Dnipro.
