= Tsentralno–Zavodska line =

Metro line in Dnipro, Ukraine

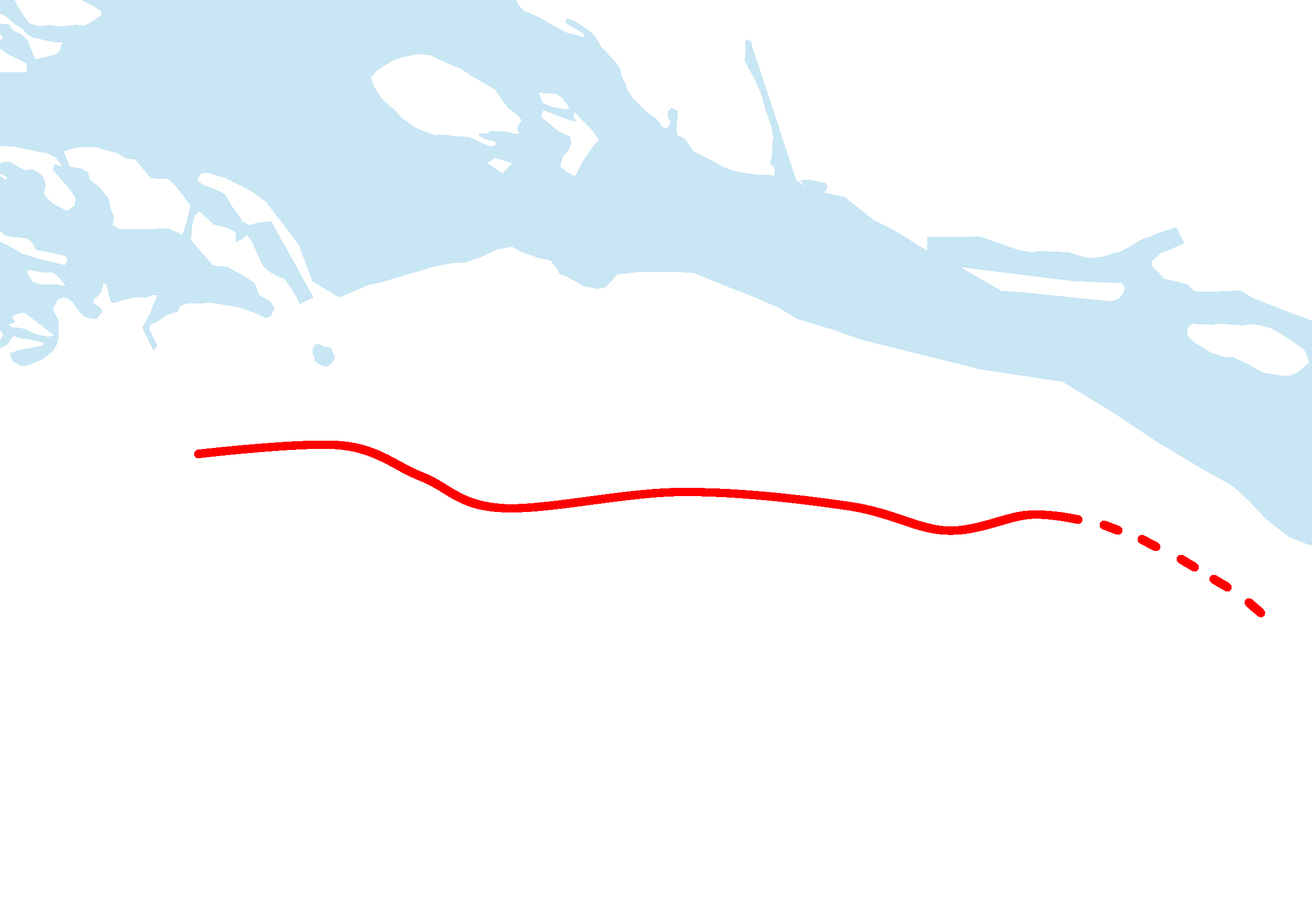

Overview
- Locale: Dnipro, Ukraine
- Termini: Pokrovska; Vokzalna
- Stations: 6

Service
- Type: Rapid transit
- System: Dnipro Metro

History
- Opened: December 29, 1995

Technical
- Line length: 7.8 kilometres (4.8 mi)
- Track gauge: 5 ft (1,524 mm)

Zavodska station on the Tsentralno–Zavodska line

The Tsentralno–Zavodska line (Ukrainian: Центрально-Заводська лінія) is the first and only line of the Dnipro Metro in Dnipro, located in east Ukraine. The line's short length, makes the Dnipro Metro system the shortest metro system in the world. The six station segment was opened on 29 December 1995 and runs from the Vokzalna station west to the terminus at Pokrovska. Only the system's depot, Diivka, is located west of Pokrovska station.

== Recent developments ==
Three stations are currently under construction, which would expand the system from the Dnipro Central Railway Station (at Vokzalna) to the city centre; Teatralna (near the Theatre of Opera and Ballet), Tsentralna, and Muzeina (near the Museum of History). After the completion of these three stations the line would finally be as it was envisioned in 1980 (by the planning of the Soviet Union). The extension will increase the number of stations to nine, which would extend the line 4 km to a total of 11.8 km (7.3 mile). In 2011, there were also plans for another new station following "Parus", a station called "Parus-2" or "Dyivska". Partly, a lack of funding for the construction predetermined that the city then named Dnipropetrovsk (Note: Dnipropetrovsk was renamed into Dnipro in 2016 in order to comply with 2015 Ukrainian decommunization laws) was not chosen as one of the host cities of the UEFA Euro 2012 football championship.

Construction of the three new stations was restarted in late February 2011 after being completely halted on 26 July 2009. The stations were expected to be finished by late 2015, but construction was stopped because the tender to select the contractor was stopped by the city council in August 2015. In November 2018, city authorities expected the three stations to be opened by the summer of 2023. In December 2020 they downgraded that prediction to 2024. Following the February 2022 full-scale Russian invasion of Ukraine all work on the expansion stopped.

== Plan extend Tsentralno–Zavodska line further ==
There are plans (all the following mentioned expansion of the line were not envisioned in the 1980s vision of the line) for two other station, "Parus" planned for the western terminus of the Tsentralno–Zavodska line, and "Dnipro" as the terminus following "Muzeina".
