= Pokrovska (Dnipro Metro) =

Station of the Dnipro Metro

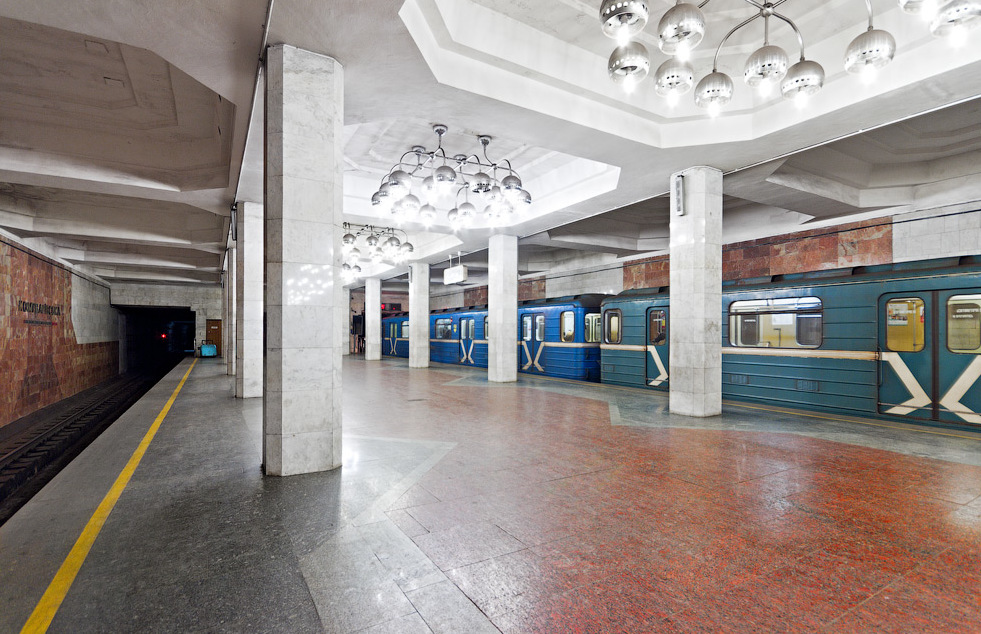
- Station Hall

General information
- Coordinates: 48°28′47.71″N 34°55′38.81″E
- System: Dnipro Metro Station
- Owner: Dnipro Metro
- Line: Tsentralno–Zavodska line
- Platforms: 1

Construction
- Structure type: underground

History
- Opened: 29 December 1995

Services
Preceding station	Dnipro Metro	Following station
Terminus	Tsentralno–Zavodska line	Prospekt Svobody towards Vokzalna
Location

Pokrovska (Ukrainian: Покровська) is a station on the Dnipro Metro's Tsentralno–Zavodska Line. It is a sub-surface station, accessible by stairs and was opened on 29 December 1995 along with the rest of the system's first stations.

The station is located on the corner of the Yuria Kondratiuka Street and the Velyka Diivska Street and in the Chervonyi Kamin and Pokrovsky (former Komunar) residential areas of Dnipro.

Until 24 November 2015, the station was named Komunarivska for the former name of Yuria Kondratiuka Street - Komunarivska. The station was renamed in order to comply with decommunization law.

== Gallery ==
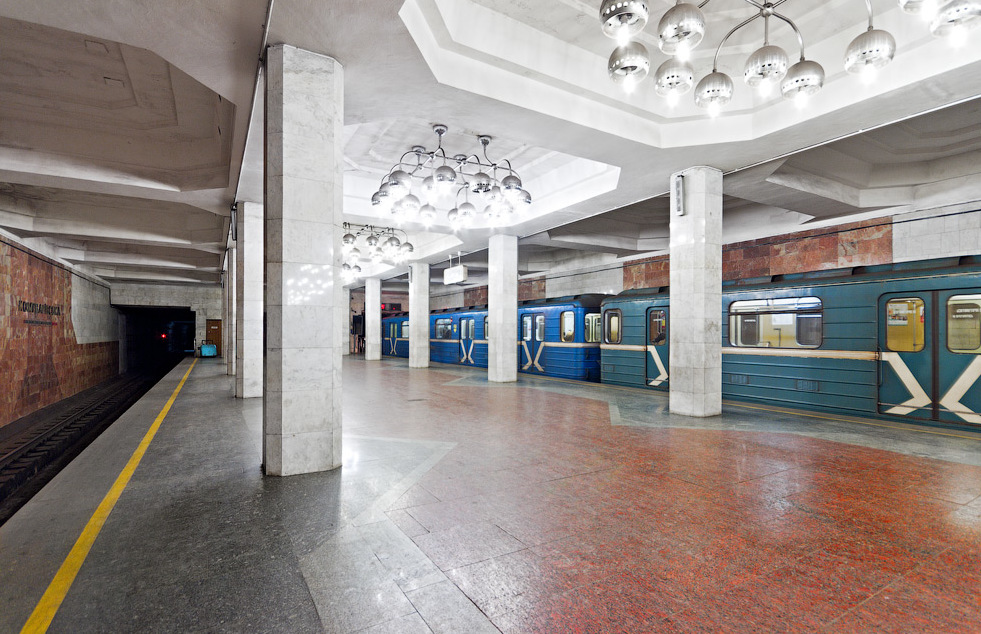

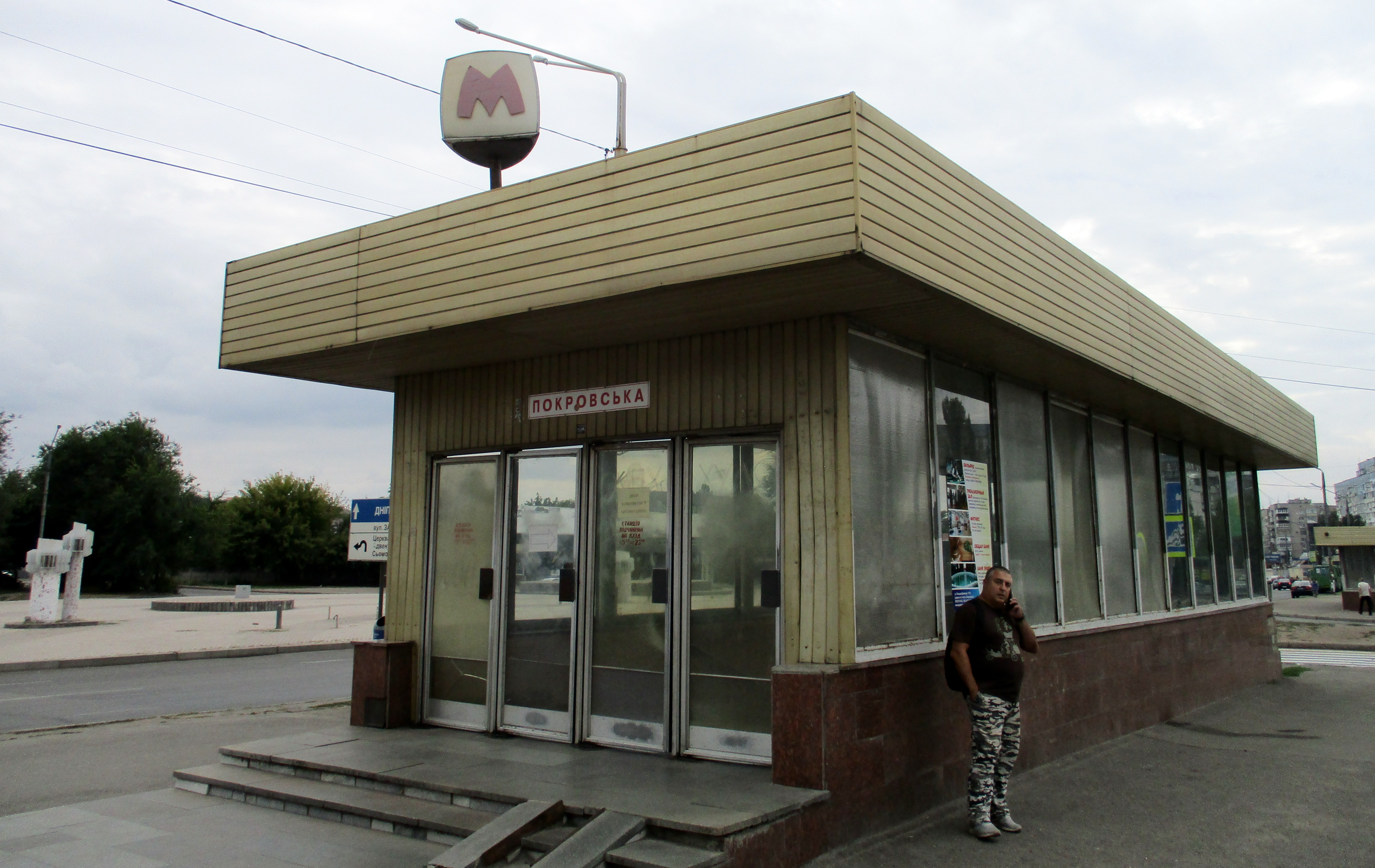
Station entrance

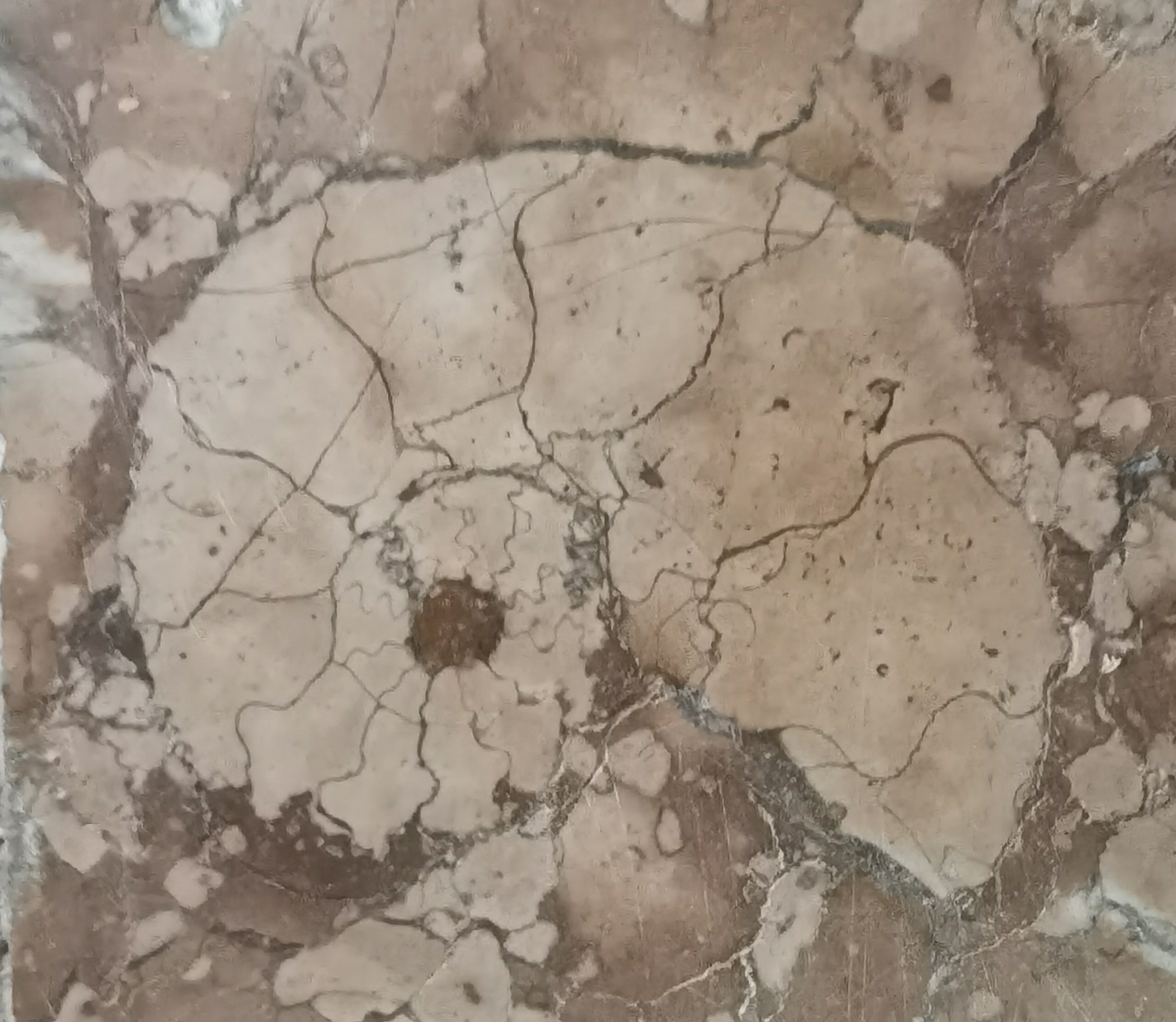
Ancient ammonite in the station's decoration.
